= 37th Air Division =

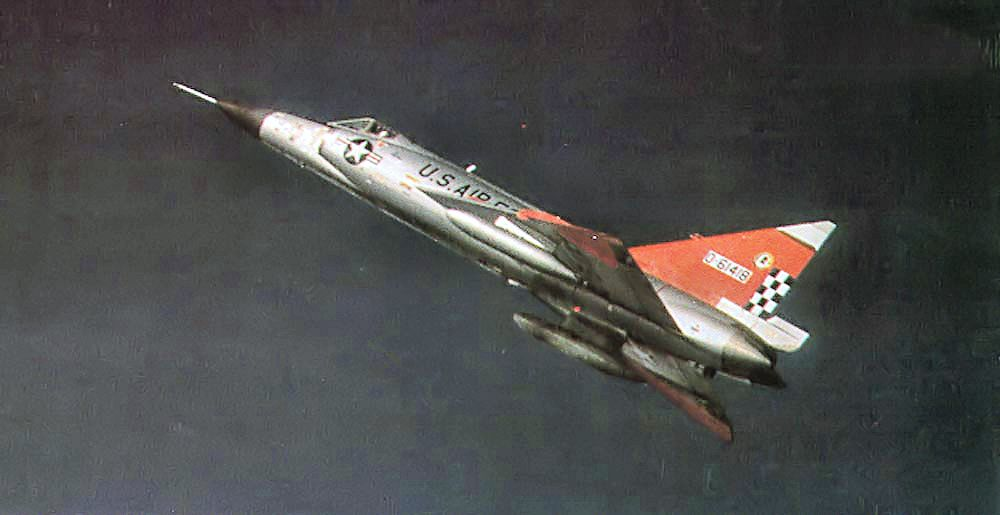
- F-102 of the division's 57th Fighter Interceptor Squadron
- Active: 1951–1952; 1955–1959; 1966–1970
- Country: United States
- Branch: United States Air Force
- Role: Command of strategic strike forces, then of air defense forces

Insignia
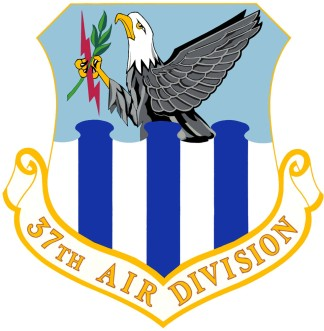
- 37th Air Division emblem (Approved 6 September 1953)

The 37th Air Division (37th AD) is an inactive United States Air Force organization. Its last assignment was with Air Defense Command at Goose Air Force Base, Labrador, Canada It was inactivated on 30 June 1970.

== History ==
=== Strategic Air Command ===
Established under Strategic Air Command in 1952 as an intermediate-level command and control organization at Lockbourne Air Force Base, Ohio. Was responsible for strategic reconnaissance operations at Lockbourne and at Lake Charles Air Force Base, Louisiana. Assigned wings operated Boeing RB-29 Superfortress very long range reconnaissance aircraft. Both wings deployed operational aircraft to Far East Air Forces in early 1952 for use in Korean War. Wings re-equipped with new Boeing RB-47 Stratojets. Inactivated in May 1952.

=== Air Defense Command ===
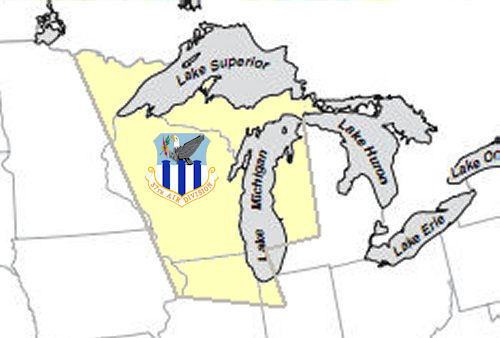
37th AD Air Defense Command AOR 1955–1959

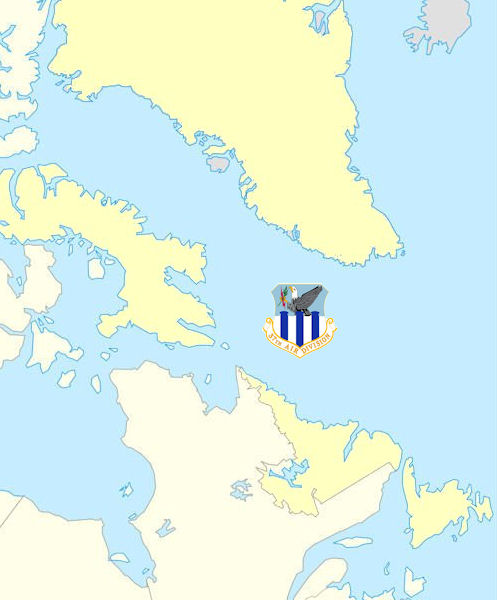
37th AD Air Defense Command AOR 1966–1970

Reactivated on 8 September 1955 by Air Defense Command (ADC) at Truax Field, Wisconsin under Eastern Air Defense Force. Was responsible for the construction and development of several Semi Automatic Ground Environment (SAGE) Data Centers. SAGE centers developed were at Truax Field, Wisconsin (DC-07) and Combat Center (CC-02); Direction Center (DC-10) at Duluth Municipal Airport, Minnesota; and Direction Center (DC-14) at K.I. Sawyer Air Force Base, Michigan. Its defense area included parts of Wisconsin, Michigan, Minnesota, Illinois, Indiana, Missouri, Iowa and southern parts of Ontario, Canada as part of the Pinetree Line.

On 8 March 1957, the Chicago Air Defense Sector, along with DC-07 and was assigned to the Division. On 8 October, the Duluth Air Defense Sector, along with DC-10 was assigned. On 8 November, the Sault Sainte Marie Air Defense Sector was also activated along with DC-14. Inactivated on 1 April 1959 as part of an ADC reorganization, most assets reassigned to the senior ADC 30th Air Division (SAGE).

Reactivated by ADC a second time in April 1966, assuming the assets of inactivating Goose Air Defense Sector at Goose Air Force Base, Labrador, Canada, including the Manual Control Center (MCC) at Goose. Assumed designation of 37th NORAD Region for stations and allied Canadian Forces assigned to NORAD air defense duties in Canada.

Was responsible for atmospheric defenses (interceptor and radar) for northeastern North America, including Greenland and Air Forces Iceland which was transferred from Military Air Transport Service.

Inactivated June 1970 by ADCOM as part of draw-down of USAF air defense forces in Canada and budget reductions, remaining assets in Canada transferred to Canadian Forces.

== Lineage ==
- Established as the 37 Air Division and organized on 10 October 1951

Discontinued on 28 May 1952

- Redesignated 37 Air Division (Defense) on 3 May 1955

Activated on 8 September 1955
Inactivated on 1 April 1959

- Redesignated 37th Air Division and activated on 20 January 1966 (not organized)

Organized on 1 April 1966
Inactivated on 30 June 1970

=== Assignments ===
- Second Air Force, 10 October 1951 – 28 May 1952
- Eastern Air Defense Force, 8 September 1955 – 1 April 1959
- Air Defense Command, 20 January 1966 (not organized)
- First Air Force, 1 April 1966
- Aerospace Defense Command, 1 December 1969 – 30 June 1970

=== Stations ===
- Lockbourne Air Force Base, Ohio, 10 October 1951 – 28 May 1952
- Truax Field, Wisconsin, 8 September 1955 – 1 April 1959
- Goose Air Force Base, Labrador, Canada, 1 April 1966 – 30 June 1970

=== Components ===
==== Strategic Air Command ====
- 68th Strategic Reconnaissance Wing: 10 October 1951 – 28 May 1952

Detached for service in Japan (Korean War): 10 October 1951-c. 15 May 1952
Lake Charles Air Force Base, Louisiana

- 91st Strategic Reconnaissance Wing: 10 October 1951 – 28 May 1952

Detached for service in Japan (Korean War): 10 October 1951 – 17 March 1952
Lockbourne Air Force Base, Ohio

==== Air Defense Command ====
===== Air Force =====
- Air Forces Iceland

Keflavik Airport, Iceland, 1 April 1966 – 31 December 1969

===== Sectors =====
- Chicago Air Defense Sector

Truax Field, Wisconsin, 8 March 1957 – 1 April 1959

- Duluth Air Defense Sector

Duluth Airport, Minnesota, 1 October-20 December 1957; 1 January-1 April 1959

- Sault Ste Marie Air Defense Sector

K.I. Sawyer Air Force Base, Michigan, 8 November 1958 – 1 April 1959

===== Wings =====
- 4706th Air Defense Wing

O'Hare International Airport, Illinois, 1 March-1 July 1956

- 4710th Air Defense Wing

O'Hare International Airport, Illinois, 1 March-8 July 1956

===== Groups =====
- 56th Fighter Group (Air Defense)

O'Hare International Airport, Illinois, 8 July 1956 – 1 April 1959

- 327th Fighter Group (Air Defense)

Truax Field, Wisconsin, 8 July 1956 – 1 April 1959

- 343d Fighter Group (Air Defense)

Duluth Airport, Minnesota, 1 January-1 April 1959

- 473d Fighter Group (Air Defense)

K. I. Sawyer Air Force Base, Michigan, 8 July 1956 – 1 April 1959

- 507th Fighter Group (Air Defense)

Kinross Air Force Base, Michigan, 8 July 1956 – 1 April 1959

- 4683d Air Base Group

Thule Air Base, Greenland, 1 April 1966 – 31 December 1969

- 4684th Air Base Group

Sondrestrom Air Base, Greenland, 1 April 1966 – 31 December 1969

===== Interceptor squadron =====
- 59th Fighter-Interceptor Squadron

Goose Air Force Base, Labrador, Canada, 1 April 1966 – 2 January 1967

===== Radar squadrons =====
- 639th Aircraft Control and Warning Squadron

Truax Field, Wisconsin, 1 December 1956
Lowther Air Station, Ontario, Canada, 1 July 1957 – 15 November 1958

- 640th Aircraft Control and Warning Squadron

Stephenville Air Station, Newfoundland, Canada, 1 April 1966 – 31 March 1970

- 641st Aircraft Control and Warning Squadron

Melville Air Station, Labrador, Canada, 1 April 1966 – 31 March 1970

- 665th Aircraft Control and Warning Squadron

Calumet Air Force Station, Michigan, 8 July 1956 – 1 April 1959

- 674th Aircraft Control and Warning Squadron

Osceola Air Force Station, Wisconsin, 1 January-1 April 1959

- 676th Aircraft Control and Warning Squadron

Antigo Air Force Station, Wisconsin, 8 July 1956 – 1 April 1959

- 692d Aircraft Control and Warning Squadron

Baudette Air Force Station, Minnesota, 1 January-1 April 1959

- 700th Aircraft Control and Warning Squadron

Two Creeks Air Force Station, Wisconsin, 8 July 1956 – 30 November 1957

- 707th Aircraft Control and Warning Squadron

Grand Rapids Air Force Station, Minnesota, 1 January-1 April 1959

- 752d Aircraft Control and Warning Squadron

Empire Air Force Station, Michigan, 8 July 1956 – 1 April 1959

- 753d Aircraft Control and Warning Squadron

Sault Sainte Marie Air Force Station, Michigan, 8 July 1956 – 1 April 1959

- 755th Aircraft Control and Warning Squadron

Williams Bay Air Force Station, Wisconsin, 8 July 1956 – 1 April 1959

- 756th Aircraft Control and Warning Squadron

Finland Air Force Station, Minnesota, 1 January-1 April 1959

- 782d Aircraft Control and Warning Squadron

Rockville Air Force Station, Indiana, 1 September 1958 – 1 April 1959

- 788th Aircraft Control and Warning Squadron

Waverly Air Force Station, Iowa, 15 October 1958 – 1 April 1959

- 790th Aircraft Control and Warning Squadron

Kirksville Air Force Station, Missouri, 15 October 1958 – 1 April 1959

- 791st Aircraft Control and Warning Squadron

Custer Air Force Station, Missouri, 15 October 1958 – 1 April 1959

- 906th Aircraft Control and Warning Squadron

Grand Marais Air Force Station, Michigan, 8 July 1956 – 30 November 1957

- 913th Aircraft Control and Warning Squadron

Pagwa Air Station, Ontario, Canada, 8 July 1956 – 1 April 1959

- 914th Aircraft Control and Warning Squadron

Armstrong Air Station, Ontario, Canada, 8 July 1956 – 1 April 1959

- 915th Aircraft Control and Warning Squadron

Sioux Lookout Air Station, Ontario, Canada, 1 January-15 November 1959

- 921st Aircraft Control and Warning Squadron

Saint Anthony Air Station, Newfoundland, Canada, 1 April 1966 – 18 June 1968

- 922d Aircraft Control and Warning Squadron

Cartwright Air Station, Labrador, Canada, 1 April 1966 – 18 June 1968

- 923d Aircraft Control and Warning Squadron

Hopedale Air Station, Labrador, Canada, 1 April 1966 – 18 June 1968

- 924th Aircraft Control and Warning Squadron

Saglek Air Station, Labrador, Canada, 1 April 1966 – 31 March 1970

== See also ==
- List of United States Air Force air divisions
- List of United States Air Force Aerospace Defense Command Interceptor Squadrons
- United States general surveillance radar stations
