= Wadena Air Force Station =

Former United States Air Force installation

Wadena Air Force Station
- Part of Air Defense Command (ADC)

Site information
- Type: Air Force Station
- Controlled by: United States Air Force

Location
- Location of Wadena AFS, Minnesota
- Coordinates: 46°30′55″N 095°06′46″W

Site history
- Built: 1952
- In use: 1952–1970

Garrison information
- Garrison: 739th Aircraft Control and Warning Squadron

Wadena Air Force Station (ADC ID: P-17, NORAD ID: Z-17) is a closed United States Air Force General Surveillance Radar station. It is located 7 miles (11 km) north-northeast of Wadena, Minnesota. It was closed in 1970.

== History ==
In late 1951 Air Defense Command selected Finland, Minnesota site as one of twenty-eight radar stations built as part of the second segment of the permanent radar surveillance network. Prompted by the start of the Korean War, on 11 July 1950, the Secretary of the Air Force asked the Secretary of Defense for approval to expedite construction of the second segment of the permanent network. Receiving the Defense Secretary's approval on 21 July, the Air Force directed the Corps of Engineers to proceed with construction.

Wadena Air Force Station began at Leaf River, Minnesota when the Minnesota Air National Guard 132d Aircraft Control and Warning Squadron was federalized during the Korean War and began operations on 1 June 1951 under the 543d Aircraft Control and Warning Group; initially the station functioned as a Ground-Control Intercept (GCI) and warning station. As a GCI station, the squadron's role was to guide interceptor aircraft toward unidentified intruders picked up on the unit's radar scopes. The Guardsmen operated AN/FPS-3 and AN/FPS-4 radars until relieved from active duty and returned to control of the State of Minnesota on 1 February 1953.

The 739th Aircraft Control and Warning Squadron began the radars in June 1952, the site being re-designated as Wadena AFS on 1 December 1953. The AN/FPS-4 unit was superseded in 1956 by an AN/FPS-6 height-finder radar. In 1958 this site was operating an AN/FPS-20 radar.

During 1959 Wadena AFS joined the Semi Automatic Ground Environment (SAGE) system, initially feeding data to DC-11 at Grand Forks AFB, North Dakota. After joining, the squadron was re-designated as the 739th Radar Squadron (SAGE) on 15 January 1960. The radar squadron provided information 24/7 the SAGE Direction Center where it was analyzed to determine range, direction altitude speed and whether or not aircraft were friendly or hostile.

In 1963, Wadena was switched to the SAGE DC-10 Data Center at Duluth AFS, Minnesota. 1959 also saw the arrival of a second height-finder radar (AN/FPS-6A). In 1961 the search radar was upgraded and redesignated as an AN/FPS-64. During 1963 the AN/FPS-6A height-finder radar was modified to an AN/FPS-90, and on 31 July 1963, the site was redesignated as NORAD ID Z-17. In 1967 the search radar was upgraded to an AN/FPS-64A. The AN/FPS-90 was removed in 1969.

In addition to the main facility, Wadena operated the following AN/FPS-18 Gap Filler sites:

- Elbow Lake, MN (P-17A) 46°05′36″N 095°57′26″W
- Bagley, MN (P-17B) 47°36′18″N 095°25′33″W

Over the years, the equipment at the station was upgraded or modified to improve the efficiency and accuracy of the information gathered by the radars. The Air Force inactivated the 739th Radar Squadron (SAGE) in September 1970 due to budget reductions. Today, the former Wadena Air Force Station is now the Bell Hill Recovery Center. Many former USAF buildings in-use.

== Air Force units and assignments ==
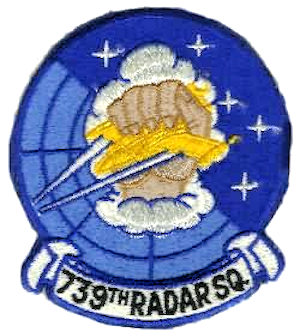
Emblem of the 739th Radar Squadron

Units:

- 739th Aircraft Control and Warning Squadron, Activated at Leaf River, Minnesota, 1 February 1953

Site re-designated Wadena Air Force Station, 1 December 1953
Re-designated 739th Radar Squadron (SAGE), 15 January 1960
Inactivated on 30 September 1970

Assignments:

- 31st Air Division, 1 February 1953
- 29th Air Division, 1 January 1959
- Grand Forks Air Defense Sector, 1 April 1959
- Duluth Air Defense Sector, 4 September 1963
- 29th Air Division, 1 April 1966
- 34th Air Division, 15 September 1969
- 29th Air Division, 14 November 1969
- 23d Air Division, 19 November 1969 – 30 September 1970

== See also ==
- United States general surveillance radar stations
