= Finley Air Force Station =

Former US Air Force radar station

Finley Air Force Station
- Part of Air Defense Command (ADC)
- Franklin Township, Steele County, near Finley, North Dakota

Site information
- Type: Air Force station
- Code: ADC ID: P-29 NORAD ID: Z-29/Z-303; Current JSS ID: J-75
- Controlled by: United States Air Force

Location
- Location of Finley AFS, North Dakota
- Coordinates: 47°30′57″N 097°52′07″W

Site history
- In use: April 1952–December 1979, April 1952–current (GATR / JSS)

Garrison information
- Garrison: 785th Radar Squadron

Finley Air Force Station is a closed United States Air Force General Surveillance Radar station. It is located 1.5 miles (2.4 km) west-northwest of Finley, North Dakota. It was closed in 1979 by the Air Force, and turned over to the Federal Aviation Administration (FAA).

Today the site is part of the Joint Surveillance System (JSS), designated by NORAD as Western Air Defense Sector (WADS) Ground Equipment Facility.

== History ==
Finley Air Force Station was part of the last batch of twenty-three radar stations constructed as part of the Air Defense Command permanent network. It was activated in April 1951, and declared completely operational in late 1952, and initially the station functioned as a Ground control intercept (GCI) and warning station. As a GCI station, the squadron's role was to guide interceptor aircraft toward unidentified intruders picked up on the unit's radar scopes.

The 785th Aircraft Control and Warning Squadron began operations with an AN/FPS-3 search radar and AN/FPS-4 from the site in April 1952. In 1957 an AN/FPS-6 replaced the AN/FPS-4 height-finder radar, and an AN/FPS-8 search radar saw brief service. At the end of 1958 this site was operating an AN/FPS-20 radar. A second height-finder (AN/FPS-6B?) was added during 1959.

At the end of 1959 Finley AFS joined the Semi Automatic Ground Environment (SAGE) system, initially feeding data to DC-20 at Malmstrom AFB, Montana. After joining, the squadron was redesignated as the 785th Radar Squadron (SAGE) on 15 January 1960. SAGE data was switched to DC-10 at Duluth AFS, Minnesota in 1963. The radar squadron provided information 24/7 the SAGE Direction Center where it was analyzed to determine range, direction altitude speed and whether or not aircraft were friendly or hostile.

In 1962 Finley operated an AN/FPS-35 search radar plus AN/FPS-6 and AN/FPS-90 height-finder radars. The AN/FPS-6 was removed in 1969. Over the years, the equipment at the station was upgraded or modified to improve the efficiency and accuracy of the information gathered by the radars.

In addition to the main facility, Finley operated four unmanned AN/FPS-14 (P-29A/B) and AN/FPS-18 (P-29C/D) Gap Filler sites:

- Sheyenne, ND (P-29A) 47°49′41″N 099°23′54″W
- Grafton, ND (P-29B) 48°24′43″N 097°22′05″W
- Valley City, ND (P-29C) 46°50′53″N 098°03′09″W
- Middle River, MN (P-29D) 48°32′09″N 096°00′55″W

The Ground to Air Transmitter-Receiver (GATR) facility was located off-station at 47°30′40″N 097°54′05″W, roughly one mile northwest of the main station.

Over the years, the equipment at the station was upgraded or modified to improve the efficiency and accuracy of the information gathered by the radars. The site was transferred to the Tactical Air Command in October 1979 with the inactivation of Aerospace Defense Command, being assigned to ADTAC. The 785th Radar Squadron (SAGE) was inactivated, and radar operations at Finley AFS (Z-29) ceased, on 30 December 1979 when a new Joint Surveillance System (JSS) was activated at the former GATR site about a mile to the northwest.

The new Finley JSS site (Z-303/J-75) began operations with an FAA ARSR-3 search radar and an Air Force AN/FPS-116 height-finder radar (removed c. 1988). That site now operates an ARSR-4. The main station equipment, buildings, fixtures, furnishings, and land was auctioned off in public auction on 9 July 2000. It is now being demolished.

== Air Force units and assignments ==
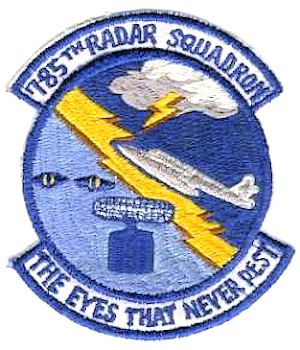
Emblem of the 785th Radar Squadron

=== Units ===
- Constituted as the 785th Aircraft Control and Warning Squadron

Activated on 10 April 1951
Redesignated as 785th Radar Squadron (SAGE) on 15 January 1960
Inactivated on 1 January 1980

=== Assignments ===
- 543d Aircraft Control and Warning Group, 10 April 1951
- 31st Air Division, 6 February 1952
- 29th Air Division, 16 February 1953
- 31st Air Division, 1 March 1956
- 29th Air Division, 1 January 1959
- Grand Forks Air Defense Sector, 1 April 1959
- Duluth Air Defense Sector, 4 September 1963
- 29th Air Division, 1 April 1966
- 28th Air Division, 15 September 1969
- 24th Air Division, 19 November 1969 – 1 January 1980

Commanders

- Lt. Col. William Joseph Pruitt c. 1969-1971
- Major Michael Pennefather c. 1972-1974

== See also ==
- List of USAF Aerospace Defense Command General Surveillance Radar Stations
- List of United States Air Force aircraft control and warning squadrons
