= Kirksville Air Force Station =

Former US Air Force radar station in Missouri

Kirksville Air Force Station
- Part of Air Defense Command (ADC)
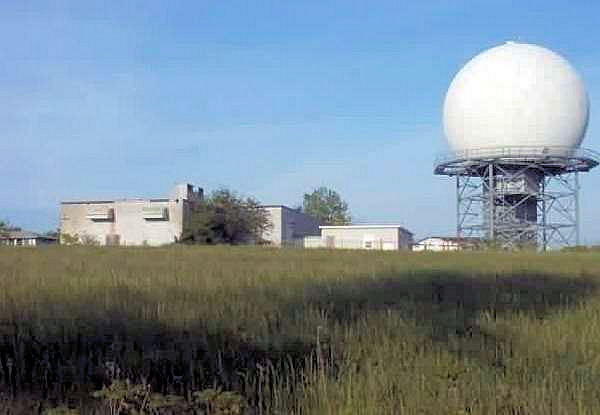
- 2008 photo of the FAA ARSR-1 Radar at the former Kirksville Air Force Station

Site information
- Type: Air Force Station
- Controlled by: United States Air Force

Location
- Location of Kirksville AFS, Missouri
- Coordinates: 40°17′52″N 092°34′32″W

Site history
- Built: 1952
- In use: 1952–1968

Garrison information
- Garrison: 790th Aircraft Control and Warning (Later Radar) Squadron

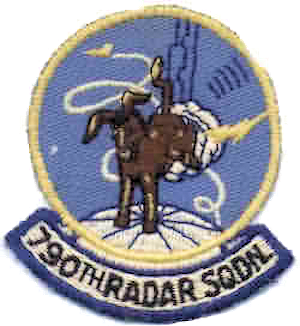
Emblem of the 790th Radar Squadron

Kirksville Air Force Station (ADC ID: P-64, NORAD ID: Z-64) is a closed United States Air Force General Surveillance Radar station. It is located 7.1 miles (11.4 km) north of Kirksville, Missouri. It was closed by the Air Force in 1968. Today the radar site is used by the Federal Aviation Administration (FAA) as a Joint Surveillance System (JSS) site.

== History ==
Kirksville Air Force Station was one of twenty-eight stations built as part of the second segment of the Air Defense Command permanent radar network. Prompted by the start of the Korean War, on 11 July 1950, the Secretary of the Air Force asked the Secretary of Defense for approval to expedite construction of the permanent network. Receiving the Defense Secretary's approval on 21 July, the Air Force directed the Corps of Engineers to proceed with construction.

Activated at Sublette, MO on 1 May 1951 the 790th Aircraft Control and Warning Squadron began operations with a pair of AN/FPS-10 radars at this site in April, and initially the station functioned as a Ground-Control Intercept (GCI) and warning station. As a GCI station, the squadron's role was to guide interceptor aircraft toward unidentified intruders picked up on the unit's radar scopes.

The station was renamed Kirksville Air Force Station (AFS) on 1 December 1953. One AN/FPS-10 height-finder radar was phased out in 1958 with the arrival of two AN/FPS-6A sets. The other AN/FPS-10 stayed in operation until 1963 and then was replaced with an AN/FPS-7.

During 1959 Kirksville AFS joined the Semi Automatic Ground Environment (SAGE) system, initially feeding data to DC-07 at Truax Field, Wisconsin. After joining, the squadron was redesignated as the 790th Radar Squadron (SAGE) on 1 November 1959. The radar squadron provided information 24/7 the SAGE Direction Center where it was analyzed to determine range, direction altitude speed and whether or not aircraft were friendly or hostile. On 31 July 1963, the site was redesignated as NORAD ID Z-64.

In addition to the main facility, Kirksville operated an AN/FPS-18 Gap Filler site:

- Washington, IA (P-64A) 41°16′17″N 091°44′41″W

Kirksville began SAGE operations in 1959. The Air Force inactivated the 790th on 8 September 1968, closing the station on 30 September. After the Air Force inactivated, it was taken over by the Federal Aviation Administration as a Long Range Radar site and was equipped with ARSR-1 Radar. Now with an ARSR-3 radar, the site is now data-tied into the Joint Surveillance System (JSS).

The USAF facilities are now largely obliterated, a few old buildings overgrown with vegetation remain.

== Air Force units and assignments ==
=== Units ===
- Constituted as the 790th Aircraft Control and Warning Squadron

Activated on 1 May 1951
Redesignated as 790th Radar Squadron (SAGE) on 1 November 1959
Discontinued and inactivated on 8 September 1968

=== Assignments ===
- 543d Aircraft Control and Warning Group, 1 May 1951
- 33d Air Division, 6 February 1952
- 20th Air Division, 1 March 1956
- 37th Air Division, 15 October 1958
- 30th Air Division, 1 April 1959
- Chicago Air Defense Sector, 1 June 1959
- 20th Air Division, 1 April 1966
- 30th Air Division, 1 December 1957 – 8 September 1968

== See also ==
- United States general surveillance radar stations
- List of United States Air Force aircraft control and warning squadrons
