= Duluth Air Defense Sector =

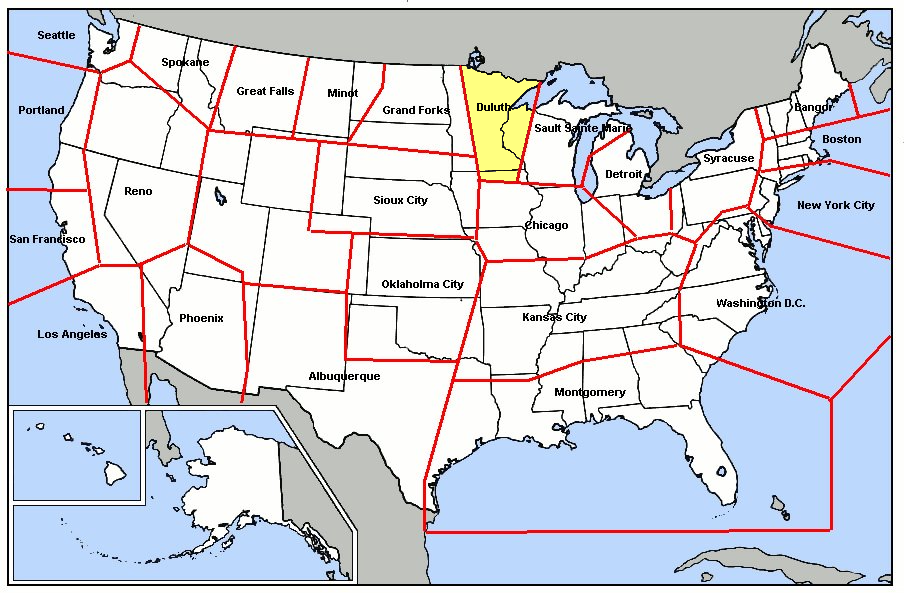
- 1958 Duluth Air Defense Sector Area of Responsibility
- Active: 1957–1966
- Country: United States
- Branch: United States Air Force
- Role: Air defense

Insignia
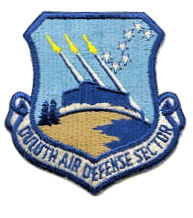
- Duluth Air Defense Sector emblem (Note: Approved 7 October 1960. Description: Light blue, in dexter chief three stylized aircraft fesswise in bend Or, each emitting a vapor trail to sinister base Azure and Argent, surmounted by in base an arched mound, with land masses brown, and water area of the third [color mentioned], bearing in dexter base two evergreen trees silhouetted of the last [color mentioned], along the edge of the mound and before a building in perspective of the like [color], a cloud mass of the fourth [color mentioned]; in sinister chief the Dipper constellation of seven mullets of the last [color mentioned] and all within a diminished border of the second [color mentioned]. Significance: The emblem is symbolic of the sector and its mission. Above a segment of the globe, representing Lake Superior and the Duluth area, the SAGE building rises out of a cloud formation. Above the building three stylized flight vehicles which represent both aircraft and missiles are streaking upward across the sky to symbolize the Duluth striking force. The constellation, Big Dipper, long a navigational aid, points the way to the North Star. The emblem bears the Air Force colors, ultramarine blue and golden yellow.)

The Duluth Air Defense Sector (DUADS) is an inactive United States Air Force organization. Its last assignment was with the Air Defense Command 29th Air Division, being stationed at Duluth Airport, Minnesota. It was inactivated on 1 April 1969.

== History ==
Established in October 1957 assuming control of former ADC Central Air Defense Force units with a mission to provide air defense of most of Minnesota and western Wisconsin. The organization provided command and control over several aircraft and radar squadrons.

In November 1959, the new Semi Automatic Ground Environment (SAGE) Direction Center (DC-10) became operational. 46°50′10″N 092°12′26″W DC-10 was equipped with dual AN/FSQ-7 Computers. The day-to-day operations of the command was to train and maintain tactical flying units flying jet interceptor aircraft (F-94 Starfire; F-102 Delta Dagger; F-106 Delta Dart) in a state of readiness with training missions and series of exercises with SAC and other units simulating interceptions of incoming enemy aircraft.

In October 1962, during the Cuban Missile Crisis, a guard at the Direction Center mistakenly identified a bear trying to climb the security fence as a saboteur and rang the alarm, which automatically triggered similar alarms at other bases in the region. A faulty alarm system at Volk Field in Wisconsin led to nuclear-armed interceptor aircraft nearly being launched.

Inactivated April 1966 as part of ADC reorganization and consolidation, the command being redesignated as the 29th Air Division. The SAGE building was remodeled and, in 1985, given to the University of Minnesota Duluth to house the Natural Resources Research Institute signed into legislation to address the struggling economy during the early 1980s recession.

=== Lineage ===
- Established as Duluth Air Defense Sector on 1 October 1957, Inactivated on 1 April 1966

=== Assignments ===
- 37th Air Division, 1 October 1957
- 31st Air Division, 20 December 1957
- 37th Air Division, 1 January 1959
- 30th Air Division, 1 April 1959 – 1 April 1966

=== Stations ===
- Duluth Airport, Minnesota, 1 October 1957 – 1 April 1966

=== Components ===
==== Wings ====
- 56th Fighter Wing (Air Defense): K. I. Sawyer AFB, Michigan, 1 October 1963 – 1 January 1964
- 507th Fighter Wing (Air Defense): Kincheloe AFB, Michigan, 1 October 1963 – 1 April 1966

==== Group ====
- 343d Fighter Group (Air Defense): Duluth Airport, Minnesota, 15 November 1959 – 1 April 1966

==== Interceptor squadrons ====
- 18th Fighter-Interceptor Squadron: Grand Forks AFB, North Dakota, 4 September 1963 – 1 April 1966
- 62d Fighter-Interceptor Squadron: K. I. Sawyer AFB, Michigan, 16 December 1963 – 1 April 1966

==== Missile squadrons ====
- 37th Air Defense Missile Squadron (BOMARC): Kincheloe AFB, Michigan, 1 October 1963 – 1 April 1966
- 74th Air Defense Missile Squadron (BOMARC): Duluth AF Missile Site, Minnesota, 1 April 1960 – 1 April 1966

==== Radar squadrons ====
- 665th Radar Squadron: Calumet AFS, Michigan, 1 October 1963 – 1 April 1966
- 674th Radar Squadron: Osceola AFS, Wisconsin, 1 July 1959 – 1 April 1966
- 676th Radar Squadron: Antigo AFS, Wisconsin, 1 October 1963 – 1 June 1964
- 692d Radar Squadron: Baudette AFS, Minnesota, 1 July 1959 – 1 April 1966
- 707th Radar Squadron: Grand Rapids AFS, Minnesota, 1 July 1959 – 1 August 1963
- 739th Radar Squadron: Wadena AFS, Minnesota, 4 September 1963 – 1 April 1966
- 753d Radar Squadron: Sault Sainte Marie AFS, Michigan, 1 October 1963 – 1 April 1966
- 756th Radar Squadron: Finland AFS, Minnesota, 1 July 1959 – 1 April 1966
- 785th Radar Squadron: Finley AFS, North Dakota, 4 September 1963 – 1 April 1966
- 914th Aircraft Control and Warning Squadron: Armstrong AS, Ontario, 15 November 1959 – 1 November 1962
- 915th Aircraft Control and Warning Squadron: Sioux Lookout AS, Ontario, 15 November 1959 – 1 October 1962

== See also ==
- List of USAF Aerospace Defense Command General Surveillance Radar Stations
- List of United States Air Force aircraft control and warning squadrons
- Aerospace Defense Command Fighter Squadrons
