= Chicago Air Defense Sector =

Inactive US Air Force organization

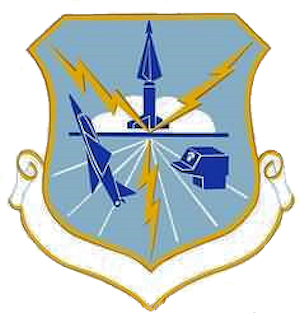
- Emblem of the Chicago Air Defense Sector
- Active: 1957–1966
- Country: United States
- Branch: United States Air Force
- Role: Air defense
- Part of: Air Defense Command

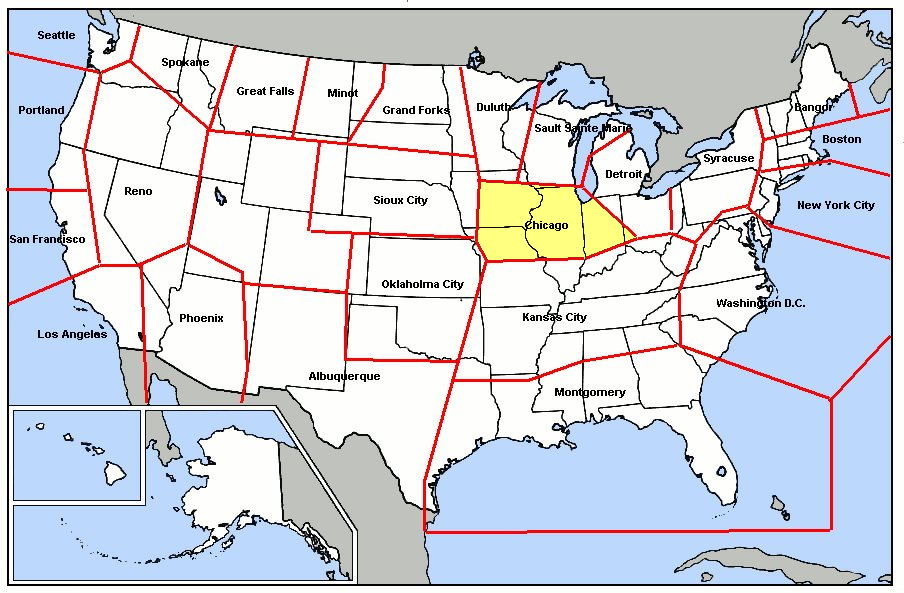
Map of Chicago ADS

The Chicago Air Defense Sector (CADS) is an inactive United States Air Force organization. Its last assignment was with the Air Defense Command (ADC) 30th Air Division at Truax Field Wisconsin. It was inactivated on 1 April 1966.

== History ==
CADS was established by redesignation of the never active 4628th Air Defense Wing at Truax Field, Wisconsin in March 1957 with a mission to provide air defense of Illinois, Indiana, most of Iowa and northern Missouri, but did not assume control of former ADC Central Air Defense Force units until 1959. The organization provided command and control over one interceptor and several radar squadrons.

On 1 October 1959, the new Semi Automatic Ground Environment (SAGE) Direction Center (DC-07) and a Combat Center (CC-02) became operational. 43°07′36″N 089°20′06″W DC-07 was equipped with dual AN/FSQ-7 Computers. The day-to-day operations of the command were to train and maintain tactical flying units flying jet interceptor aircraft (F-102 Delta Dagger, F-106 Delta Dart) and radar squadrons in a state of readiness with training missions and series of exercises with Strategic Air Command and other units simulating interceptions of incoming enemy aircraft.

The Sector was inactivated 1 April 1966 as part of ADC reorganization and consolidation, the command being replaced at Truax Field by the 20th Air Division, and its units in Indiana were reassigned to the 34th Air Division.

=== Lineage ===
- Designated as 4628th Air Defense Wing, SAGE in 1956

Redesignated as Chicago Air Defense Sector and activated on 8 March 1957
Discontinued and inactivated on 1 April 1966

=== Assignments ===
- 37th Air Division, 8 March 1957
- 30th Air Division, 1 April 1959 – 1 April 1966

=== Stations ===
- Truax Field, Wisconsin, 8 March 1957 – 1 April 1966

=== Components ===
==== Group ====
- 327th Fighter Group (Air Defense)

Truax Field, Wisconsin, 1 June 1959 – 1 April 1966

==== Interceptor Squadron ====
- 319th Fighter-Interceptor Squadron

Bunker Hill AFB, Indiana, 1 July 1960 – 1 February 1963

==== Radar Squadrons ====
- 676th Radar Squadron

Antigo AFS, Wisconsin, 1 June 1964 – 1 April 1966

- 725th Aircraft Control & Warning Squadron (later 725th Radar Squadron)

Walnut Ridge AFS, Arkansas, 1 July 1961 – 1 August 1963

- 755th Aircraft Control & Warning Squadron (later 755th Radar Squadron)

Williams Bay AFS, Wisconsin, 1 June 1959 – 1 April 1960
Arlington Heights AFS, Illinois, 1 April 1960 – 1 April 1966

- 782nd Aircraft Control & Warning Squadron (later 782d Radar Squadron)

Rockville AFS, Indiana, 1 June 1959 – 1 April 1966

- 784th Aircraft Control & Warning Squadron (later 784th Radar Squadron)

Snow Mountain AFS, Kentucky, 1 June 1961 – 1 August 1961; 25 May 1962 - 1 April 1966

- 788th Aircraft Control & Warning Squadron (later 788th Radar Squadron)

Waverly AFS, Iowa, 1 June 1959 – 1 April 1966

- 790th Aircraft Control & Warning Squadron (later 790th Radar Squadron)

Kirksville AFS, Missouri, 1 June 1959 – 1 April 1966

- 791st Aircraft Control & Warning Squadron (later 791st Radar Squadron)

Hanna City AFS, Illinois, 1 June 1959 – 1 April 1966

- 798th Aircraft Control & Warning Squadron (later 798th Radar Squadron)

Belleville AFS, Illinois, 1 July 1961 – 1 April 1966

=== Aircraft ===
- F-102A, 1959-1966
- F-106A, 1960-1963

== See also ==
- List of USAF Aerospace Defense Command General Surveillance Radar Stations
- Aerospace Defense Command Fighter Squadrons
- List of United States Air Force aircraft control and warning squadrons
