= Finland Air Force Station =

Radar station in Minnesota, US 1950–1980

Finland Air Force Station
- Part of Air Defense Command (ADC)

Site information
- Type: Air Force Station
- Code: ADC ID: P-69, NORAD ID: Z-69
- Controlled by: United States Air Force

Location
- Location of Finland AFS, Minnesota
- Coordinates: 47°27′13″N 091°14′15″W

Site history
- Built: 1950
- In use: 1950–1989

Garrison information
- Garrison: 756th Aircraft Control and Warning Squadron

Finland Air Force Station is a closed United States Air Force General Surveillance Radar station. It is located 2.8 miles (4.5 km) north of Finland, Minnesota. It was closed in 1980.

In 1950 Air Defense Command selected Finland, Minnesota site as one of twenty-eight radar stations built as part of the second segment of the permanent radar surveillance network. Prompted by the start of the Korean War, on 11 July 1950, the Secretary of the Air Force asked the Secretary of Defense for approval to expedite construction of the second segment of the permanent network. Receiving the Defense Secretary's approval on 21 July, the Air Force directed the Corps of Engineers to proceed with construction.

== History ==
Finland Air Force Station began as a "Lashup-Permanent" radar site (LP-69) with the 756th Aircraft Control and Warning Squadron operating an AN/CPS-5 radar at the station on 30 Nov 1951, and initially the station functioned as a Ground-control intercept (GCI) and warning station. As a GCI station, the squadron's role was to guide interceptor aircraft toward unidentified intruders picked up on the unit's radar scopes. On 1 May 1951 the station joined the "permanent" ADC network operating AN/FPS-3 and AN/FPS-5 radars. By 1959 these radars had been replaced with AN/FPS-20 and AN/FPS-6 sets, and a second height-finder radar (AN/FPS-6A) was being installed.

During 1959 Finland AFS joined the Semi Automatic Ground Environment (SAGE) system, initially feeding data to DC-10 at Duluth AFS, Minnesota. After joining, the squadron was re-designated as the 756th Radar Squadron (SAGE) on 15 December 1959. The radar squadron provided information 24/7 the SAGE Direction Center where it was analyzed to determine range, direction altitude speed and whether or not aircraft were friendly or hostile.

In 1961 the search radar was upgraded and redesignated as an AN/FPS-64. In 1963 the height-finder radars were replaced by AN/FPS-26A and AN/FPS-90 sets, and on 31 July 1963, the site was redesignated as NORAD ID Z-69. In 1964 the AN/FPS-64 was replaced by an AN/FPS-27. The AN/FPS-90 height-finder radar was decommissioned in 1970.

In addition to the main facility, Calumet operated the following AN/FPS-18 Gap Filler sites:

- Upson, WI (P-69B) 46°25′10″N 090°23′06″W
- Askov, MN (P-69C) 46°14′12″N 092°44′32″W
- Aurora, MN (P-69D) 47°35′53″N 092°13′27″W

Over the years, the equipment at the station was upgraded or modified to improve the efficiency and accuracy of the information gathered by the radars. Finland came under Tactical Air Command jurisdiction in October 1979 with the inactivation of Aerospace Defense Command and the formation of ADTAC. The 756th Radar Squadron was inactivated 15 Aug 1980. The Ground/Air Task Oriented Radar (GATR) site was retained until the Joint Surveillance System (JSS) switchover in 1984.

Today the radar station is largely abandoned. The former Air Force Housing area was in use as single-family housing, but is now also mostly abandoned.

== Air Force units and assignments ==
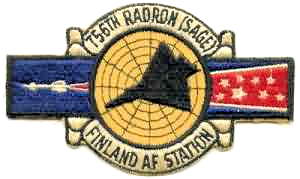
Emblem of the 756th Radar Squadron

=== Units ===
- Constituted as the 756th Aircraft Control and Warning Squadron on 14 November 1950

Activated on 27 November 1950
Redesignated as 756th Radar Squadron (SAGE) on 15 December 1959
Redesignated as 756th Radar Squadron on 1 February 1974
Inactivated on 15 June 1980

Assignments:

- 543d Aircraft Control and Warning Group, 1 January 1951
- 31st Air Division, 6 February 1952
- 37th Air Division, 1 July 1959
- 30th Air Division, 1 April 1959
- Duluth Air Defense Sector, 1 July 1959
- 29th Air Division, 1 April 1966
- 34th Air Division, 15 September 1969
- 23d Air Division, 19 November 1969 – 15 June 1980

== See also ==
- List of United States Air Force aircraft control and warning squadrons
- United States general surveillance radar stations
