= Grand Rapids Air Force Station =

Closed US military installation

Grand Rapids Air Force Station
- Part of Air Defense Command (ADC)

Site information
- Type: Air Force Station
- Code: ADC ID: SM-138
- Controlled by: United States Air Force

Location
- Location of Grand Rapids AFS, Minnesota
- Coordinates: 47°14′25″N 93°30′54″W

Site history
- Built: 1956
- In use: 1956-1963

Garrison information
- Garrison: 707th Aircraft Control and Warning Squadron

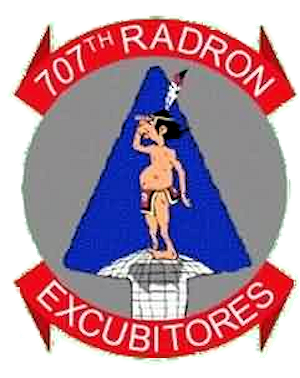
Emblem of the 707th Radar Squadron

Grand Rapids Air Force Station is a closed United States Air Force General Surveillance Radar station. It is located 0.7 miles (1.1 km) east-northeast of Grand Rapids, Minnesota. It was closed in 1963.

== History ==
Grand Rapids Air Force Station was initially part of Phase II of the Air Defense Command Mobile Radar program. The Air Force approved this expansion of the Mobile Radar program on 23 October 1952. Radars in this network were designated "SM."

The station became operational on 1 July 1956 when the 707th Aircraft Control and Warning Squadron began operating an AN/FPS-3 search radar, and initially the station functioned as a Ground-Control Intercept (GCI) and warning station. As a GCI station, the squadron's role was to guide interceptor aircraft toward unidentified intruders picked up on the unit's radar scopes. In 1958 the squadron was operating AN/FPS-20 and AN/FPS-6 sets.

During 1959 Grand Rapids AFS joined the Semi Automatic Ground Environment (SAGE) system, initially feeding data to DC-10 at Duluth AFS, Minnesota. After joining, the squadron was re-designated as the 707th Radar Squadron (SAGE) on 15 December 1959. The radar squadron provided information 24/7 the SAGE Direction Center where it was analyzed to determine range, direction altitude speed and whether or not aircraft were friendly or hostile. In addition, an AN/FPS-6B height-finder radar was added that year. In 1962 the AN/FPS-20A was upgraded and redesignated as an AN/FPS-67.

In March 1963 the Air Force ordered the site to close. Operations of the 707th RS ceased on 1 August and the site was closed on 30 August.

The site was declared excess to GSA on 7 January 1964. Several parcels were conveyed to the Department of the Interior, the Grand Rapids School District # 318, and the Bureau of Mines. The 7.22 acres conveyed to the Bureau of Mines in 1967 was returned to GSA and then sold to nineteen private owners for private residences. Most of the site has been demolished to make room for new construction.

== Air Force units and assignments ==
=== Units ===
- 707th Aircraft Control and Warning Squadron

Activated at Snelling AFS, Minnesota on 8 April 1956 (not manned or equipped)
Moved to Grand Rapids AFS on 1 July 1956
Redesignated as 707th Radar Squadron (SAGE) on 15 December 1959
Discontinued and inactivated 1 August 1963

=== Assignments ===
- 31st Air Division, 1 July 1956
- 37th Air Division, 1 January 1959
- 30th Air Division, 1 April 1959
- Duluth Air Defense Sector, 1 July 1959 – 1 August 1963

== See also ==
- List of USAF Aerospace Defense Command General Surveillance Radar Stations
