= Hanna City Air Force Station =

Radar station in Peoria County, Illinois

Hanna City Air Force Station
- Part of Air Defense Command (ADC)

Site information
- Type: Air Force Station
- Controlled by: United States Air Force

Location
- Location of station in Peoria County, Illinois Hanna City AFS (Illinois)
- Coordinates: 40°41′56″N 089°49′33″W

Site history
- Built: 1951
- In use: 1951–1968

Garrison information
- Garrison: 791st Aircraft Control and Warning (later Radar) Squadron

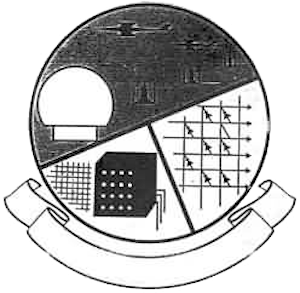
Emblem of the 791st Radar Squadron

Hanna City Air Force Station (ADC ID: P-63, NORAD ID: Z-63) is a closed United States Air Force General Surveillance Radar station. It is located 1.6 miles (2.6 km) west-northwest of Hanna City, Illinois. It was closed in 1968. It is still in use by the Federal Aviation Administration as a Joint Surveillance System radar station.

== History ==
Hanna City Air Force Station (AFS) was one of twenty-eight stations built as part of the second segment of the Air Defense Command permanent radar network. Prompted by the start of the Korean War, on 11 July 1950, the Secretary of the Air Force asked the Secretary of Defense for approval to expedite construction of the permanent network.

Receiving the Defense Secretary's approval on 21 July, the Air Force directed the Corps of Engineers to proceed with construction. 42.8 acres (17.3 ha) were acquired between 1952 and July 1959. The Air Force constructed and operated the station, which included over 35 buildings and miscellaneous smaller structures.

The 791st Aircraft Control and Warning Squadron was activated at Hanna City AFS on 10 May 1951 and began operations using AN/FPS-3 and AN/FPS-4 radars, and initially the station functioned as a Ground-Control Intercept (GCI) and warning station. As a GCI station, the squadron's role was to guide interceptor aircraft toward unidentified intruders picked up on the unit's radar scopes.

In 1958 Hanna City AFS replaced the AN/FPS-3 with an AN/FPS-20 search radar, and added an AN/FPS-6A height-finder radar. During 1959 the AN/FPS-4 was replaced by a second height-finder radar (AN/FPS-6B), and Hanna City AFS joined the Semi Automatic Ground Environment (SAGE) system, feeding data to DC-07 at Truax Field, Wisconsin. After joining, the squadron was redesignated as the 791st Radar Squadron (SAGE) on 1 November 1959. The radar squadron provided information 24/7 the SAGE Direction Center where it was analyzed to determine range, direction altitude speed and whether or not aircraft were friendly or hostile. On 31 July 1963, the site was redesignated as NORAD ID Z-85.

In 1964 the AN/FPS-20A was upgraded and redesignated as an AN/FPS-67, and an AN/FPS-90 replaced the AN/FPS-6B height-finder radar. The AN/FPS-67 was upgraded to an AN/FPS-67B in 1968. The AN/FPS-6A was removed some time in this time frame.

The 791st Radar Squadron was inactivated on 18 June 1968, and the site was closed on 30 June due to budget reductions. The radar towers and four buildings were transferred to the FAA and site remains an active JSS radar site.

The remainder of the site was then declared excess to the General Services Administration on 28 January 1969 and conveyed to the Department of Health, Education and Welfare (HEW) on 8 August 1969. It operated as Hanna City Work Camp, an Illinois Department of Corrections minimum security prison. The old USAF buildings were still in use up to 2002 and structures used as observation towers appeared to be the old four-legged steel temperate radar towers.

The Hanna City Work Camp closed in October 2002 and the state of Illinois turned over the work camp site to Peoria County in 2009. As of August 2009, the site was occasionally being used for training of Peoria County Sheriff's Office for Special Weapons and Tactics (SWAT). As of 2012, the FAA radar was still at the site and Peoria County was looking for ideas for usage of the remainder of the property, including creation of an agribusiness incubator or community organic farm.

== Air Force units and assignments ==
=== Units ===
- Constituted as the 791st Aircraft Control and Warning Squadron

Activated on 10 May 1951
Redesignated as 791st Radar Squadron (SAGE) on 1 November 1959
Discontinued and inactivated on 18 June 1968

=== Assignments ===
- 543d Aircraft Control and Warning Group, 10 May 1951
- 31st Air Division 6 February 1952
- 20th Air Division, 1 March 1956
- 37th Air Division, 15 October 1958
- 30th Air Division, 1 April 1959
- Chicago Air Defense Sector, 1 June 1959
- 20th Air Division, 1 April 1966
- 30th Air Division, 1 December 1967 – 18 June 1968

== See also ==
- List of United States Air Force aircraft control and warning squadrons
- United States general surveillance radar stations
