= 913th Aircraft Control and Warning Squadron =

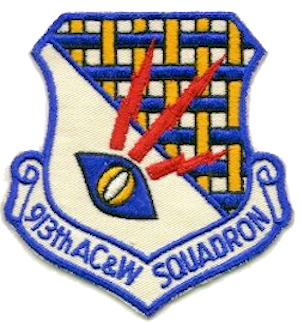
- Emblem of the 913th Aircraft Control and Warning Squadron
- Active: 1952-1963
- Country: United States
- Branch: United States Air Force
- Type: General Radar Surveillance

The 913th Aircraft Control and Warning Squadron is an inactive United States Air Force unit. It was last assigned to the Sault Sainte Marie Air Defense Sector, Air Defense Command, stationed at Pagwa Air Station, Ontario, Canada. It was inactivated on 1 June 1963.

The unit was a General Surveillance Radar squadron providing for the air defense of North America.

== Lineage ==
- Constituted as the 913th Aircraft Control and Warning Squadron

Activated on 10 March 1952
Inactivated on 1 June 1963

Assignments

- 32d Air Division, 10 March 1952
- 30th Air Division, 20 December 1952
- 4708th Defense Wing (later 4708th Air Defense Wing), 16 February 1953
- 37th Air Division, 8 July 1956
- 30th Air Division, 1 April 1959
- Sault Sainte Marie Air Defense Sector, 1 April 1960 – 1 June 1963

Stations

- Grenier AFB, Maine, 10 March 1952
- Pagwa Air Station, Ontario, Canada, 20 December 1952 – 1 June 1963
