= CFS Sioux Lookout =

Closed General Surveillance Radar station

CFS Sioux Lookout

Site information
- Type: Radar Station
- Controlled by: United States Air Force; Royal Canadian Air Force

Location
- Coordinates: 50°04′59″N 092°00′08″W

Site history
- Built: 1952
- Built by: United States Air Force
- In use: 1953-1962,1962-1987

Location of Canadian Forces Station Sioux Lookout, Ontario

Canadian Forces Station Sioux Lookout (ADC ID: C-16) is a closed General Surveillance Radar station. It is located 3.7 miles (6.0 km) west of Sioux Lookout, Ontario. It was closed in 1987.

It was operated as part of the Pinetree Line network controlled by NORAD.

== History ==
As a result of the Cold War and with the expansion of a North American continental air defence system, Sioux Lookout was selected as a site for a United States Air Force (USAF) radar station, one of the many that would make up the Pinetree Line of Ground-Control Intercept (GCI) radar sites. Construction on the Sioux Lookout base began in 1952 and was completed by 1953. The base was manned by members of the USAF's Air Defense Command (ADC) 915th Aircraft Control and Warning Squadron, being known as Sioux Lookout Air Station.

In April 1953 of the following year, operations began at the unit's permanent home. The station was equipped with AN/FPS-3C, AN/FPS-502, AN/FPS-20A, AN/TPS-502, and AN/FPS-6B radars. As a GCI base, the 915th's role was to guide interceptor aircraft toward unidentified intruders picked up on the unit's radar scopes. These interceptors were based at Duluth International Airport in Minnesota.

In the early 1960s, the USAF relinquished control of the base to the Royal Canadian Air Force (RCAF). This was part of an arrangement with the United States that came as a result of the cancellation of the Avro Arrow. Canada would lease 66 F-101 Voodoo fighters and take over operation of 12 Pinetree radar bases.

Upon hand-over on 1 October 1962, the operating unit was re-designated 39 Aircraft Control and Warning Squadron and the base, RCAF Station Sioux Lookout. Radars at the station were also upgraded to the following:

- Search Radar: AN/FPS-3C, AN/FPS-502, AN/FPS-20A, AN/FPS-7C, AN/FPS-107
- Height Radar: AN/TPS-502, AN/FPS-6B, AN/FPS-26A

In 1963, radar operations at 39 Squadron were automated by the Semi Automatic Ground Environment (SAGE) system, and the station became a long-range radar site. It would no longer guide interceptors but only look for enemy aircraft, feeding data to the Duluth Air Defense Sector SAGE DC-10 Direction Center of the 30th NORAD Region. As a consequence of the change, the operating unit was once again renamed, this time as 39 Radar Squadron.

In 1966, Sioux Lookout was reassigned to the 29th NORAD Region, and in October 1967, Sioux Lookout was once again re-designated. This time, the change was due to the creation of the Canadian Armed Forces, the new tri-service organization that absorbed the RCAF, RCN and the Canadian Army. 39 Radar Squadron, RCAF Station Sioux Lookout, became simply Canadian Forces Station (CFS) Sioux Lookout.

In yet another organizational change, Sioux Lookout was again switched to the 23d NORAD Region in 1969. Beginning in 1983 it began reporting to Canada West ROCC.

The last major change came in the 1980s. After a lengthy review by both the Canadian and American defence ministries, it was decided to modernize the North American air defence infrastructure. DEW Line equipment was upgraded and the Line was renamed the North Warning System. With this newer equipment, it was decided to close most Pinetree Stations. CFS Sioux Lookout was thus disbanded in July 1987.

Today, the station remains standing, although thought as deserted and apparently unused, it is privately owned and now used as a homestead.

The Sioux lookout AN/FPS 107 antenna can be seen at the communication and electronic branch museum at CFB Kingston east McNaughton side. The antenna was reduce in size due to the pedestal size, and not counting that some of those antenna panels were used to creates small bridges on the CFB Kingston golf course…

== See also ==
- List of Royal Canadian Air Force stations
- List of USAF Aerospace Defense Command General Surveillance Radar Stations
