= 30th Air Division =

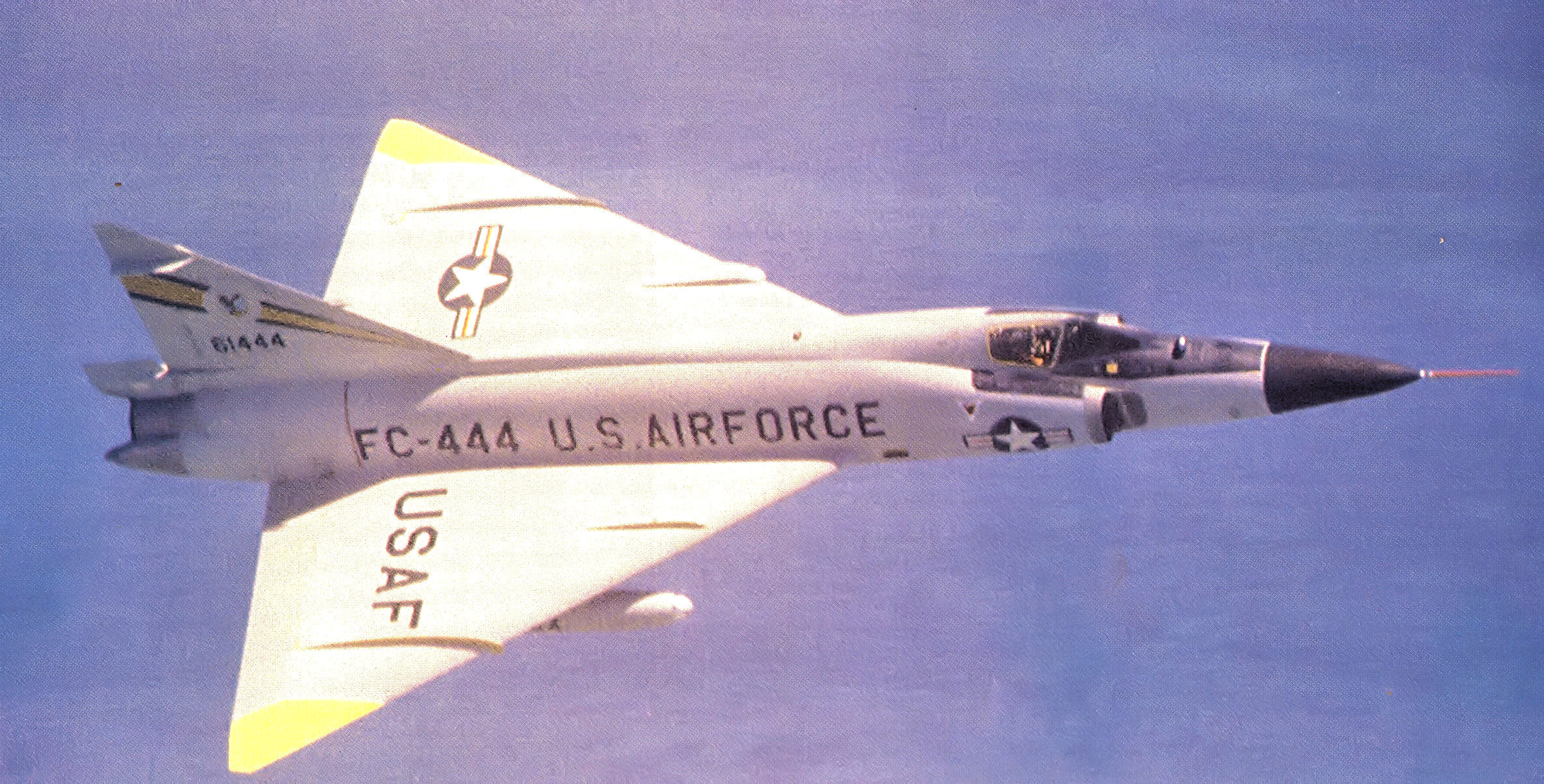
- F-102A Delta Dagger of the division's 326th Fighter-Interceptor Squadron
- Active: 1948–1968
- Country: United States
- Branch: United States Air Force
- Role: Command of air defense forces
- Decorations: Air Force Outstanding Unit Award

Insignia
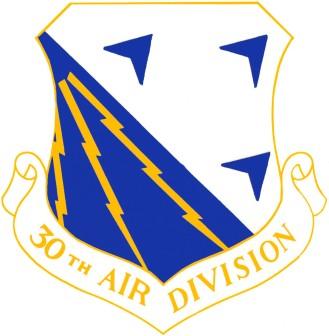
- 30th Air Division emblem (Note: Approved 7 October 1954,)

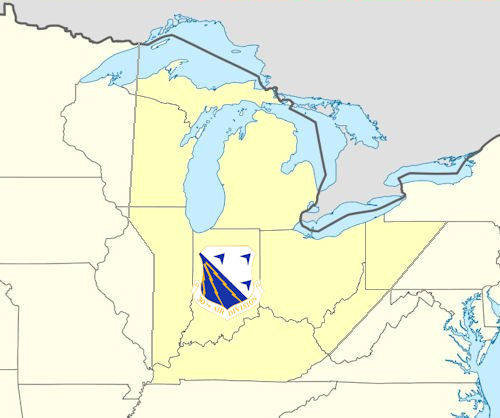
30th Air Division ADC AOR 1949–1960

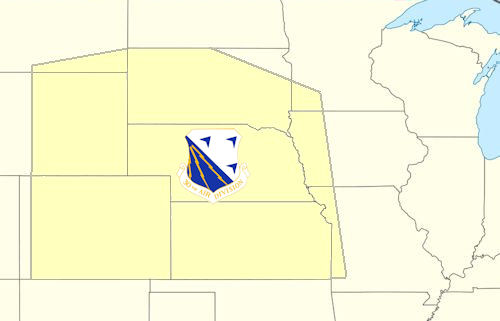
30th Air Division ADC AOR 1966–1968

The 30th Air Division is an inactive United States Air Force organization. Its last assignment was with Air Defense Command, assigned to Tenth Air Force, being stationed at Sioux City Municipal Airport, Iowa. It was inactivated on 18 September 1968.

== History ==
Assigned to Air Defense Command (ADC) for most of its existence, the division's initial mission was the air defense of the upper Great Lakes region of the United States. The 30th equipped, administered, trained, and provided operationally ready forces to the appropriate commanders for air defense. The division trained attached and assigned units and supervised and participated in numerous exercises such as Kiowa Knife and Mandan Indian.

Moved to Sioux City Municipal Airport in 1966 as part of an ADC reorganization and became responsible for air defense in a large area of the upper Midwest after the inactivation of the Sioux City Air Defense Sector. Assumed additional designation of 30th NORAD Region after activation of the NORAD Combat Operations Center at the Cheyenne Mountain Complex, Colorado, and reporting was transferred to NORAD from ADC at Ent Air Force Base in April 1966.

The 30th administered and trained subordinate units, and participated in numerous air defense training exercises. In addition, during the 1960s it supervised training of Air National Guard units with a pertinent mobilization assignment.

Inactivated in September 1968 as ADC phased down its interceptor mission as the chances of a Soviet bomber attack on the United States seemed remote, its mission being consolidated into North American Aerospace Defense Command (NORAD) and its assets transferred to 24th NORAD Region/Air Division.

== Lineage ==
- Established as the 30 Air Division (Defense) on 8 November 1949

Activated on 16 December 1949
Inactivated on 1 February 1952

- Organized on 1 February 1952

Redesignated 30 Air Division (SAGE) on 1 April 1959
Discontinued and inactivated on 18 September 1968

=== Assignments ===
- Tenth Air Force, 16 December 1949 (attached to Eastern Air Defense Force after 1 January 1951)
- Eastern Air Defense Force, 1 September 1950 – 1 July 1959
- Air Defense Command, 1 July 1959
- Tenth Air Force, 1 April 1966 – 18 September 1968

=== Stations ===
- Selfridge Air Force Base, Michigan – 16 December 1949 – 7 April 1952
- Willow Run Airport (later Willow Run Air Force Station), Michigan, 7 April 1952
- Truax Field, Wisconsin, 1 April 1959
- Sioux City Municipal Airport, Iowa, 1 April 1966 – 18 September 1968

=== Components ===
==== Division ====
- 31st Air Division (attached): 27 November 1950 – 1 February 1951

==== Sectors ====
- Chicago Air Defense Sector: 1 April 1959 – 1 April 1966

Truax Field, Wisconsin

- Detroit Air Defense Sector: 8 January 1957 – 4 September 1963

Custer Air Force Station, Michigan

- Duluth Air Defense Sector: 1 April 1959 – 1 April 1966

Duluth Airport, Minnesota

- Sault Ste Marie Air Defense Sector: 1 April 1959 – 15 December 1963

K.I. Sawyer Air Force Base, Michigan

==== Wings ====
1st Fighter Wing (Air Defense), 18 October 1956 – 1 April 1959
Selfridge Air Force Base, Michigan

- 56th Fighter-Interceptor Wing: attached 20 February 1950 – 6 February 1952

Selfridge Air Force Base, Michigan

- 328th Fighter Wing: 1 April 1966 – 18 July 1968

Richards-Gebaur Air Force Base, Missouri

- 343d Fighter Wing: 1 April-1 July 1959

Duluth Municipal Airport, Minnesota

- 412th Fighter Wing: 8 July 1956 – 1 April 1960

Wurtsmith Air Force Base, Michigan

- 473d Fighter Wing: 1 April-1 October 1959

K. I. Sawyer Air Force Base, Michigan

- 507th Fighter Wing: 1 April 1959 – 1 April 1960

Kincheloe Air Force Base, Michigan

- 4706th Defense Wing (later 4706 Air Defense) Wing: 16 February 1953 – 1 March 1956

Kincheloe Air Force Base, Michigan

- 4708th Defense Wing (later 4708 Air Defense) Wing): 6 February 1952 – 18 October 1956

Selfridge Air Force Base, Michigan

- 4711th Air Defense Wing: 1 March – 8 July 1956

Kincheloe Air Force Base, Michigan

==== Groups ====
- 1st Fighter Group

Selfridge Air Force Base, Michigan, 8 July-8 October 1956

- 15th Fighter Group: 8 July 1956 – 1 September 1958

Niagara Falls Municipal Airport, New York

- 54th Fighter Group: 8 July 1956 – 8 January 1958

Greater Pittsburgh Airport, Pennsylvania

- 56th Fighter Group: 1 April 1959 – 1 April 1960

K. I. Sawyer Air Force Base, Michigan

- 79th Fighter Group: 8 July 1956 – 1 April 1959

Youngstown Municipal Airport, Ohio

- 327th Fighter Group: 1 April-1 June 1959

Truax Field, Wisconsin

- 343d Fighter Group

Duluth International Airport, Minnesota, 1 April-15 November 1959

- 412th Fighter Group

Wurtsmith Air Force Base, Michigan, 8 July 1956 – 1 April 1960

- 473d Fighter Group

K. I. Sawyer Air Force Base, Michigan, 1 April-1 October 1959

- 507th Fighter Group

Kincheloe Air Force Base, Michigan, 1 April 1959 – 1 February 1961

- 541st Aircraft Control and Warning Group

Selfridge Air Force Base, Michigan, 1 January 1951 – 6 February 1952

==== Interceptor Squadrons ====
- 18th Fighter-Interceptor Squadron: 1 April-1 May 1960

Wurtsmith Air Force Base, Michigan

- 56th Fighter-Interceptor Squadron: 1 September 1958 – 1 April 1959

Wright-Patterson Air Force Base, Ohio

- 71st Fighter-Interceptor Squadron: 25 October 1950 – 4 June 1951

Greater Pittsburgh Airport, Pennsylvania

- 87th Fighter-Interceptor Squadron: 1 September 1958 – 1 April 1959

Lockbourne Air Force Base, Ohio

- 319th Fighter-Interceptor Squadron: 1 September 1958 – 1 April 1959

Bunker Hill Air Force Base, Indiana

==== Missile Squadron ====
- 37th Air Defense Missile Squadron (BOMARC): 1 March – 1 April 1960

Kincheloe Air Force Base, Michigan

==== Radar Squadrons ====
- 625th Radar Squadron

Hastings Air Force Station, Nebraska, 1 April 1966 – 8 September 1968

- 639th Aircraft Control and Warning Squadron

Lowther Air Station, Ontario, 1 April 1959 – 1 April 1960

- 661st Aircraft Control and Warning Squadron

Selfridge Air Force Base, Michigan, 8 July 1956 – 1 April 1959

- 662d Aircraft Control and Warning Squadron

Brookfield Air Force Station, Ohio, 8 July 1956 – 1 April 1959

- 663d Aircraft Control and Warning Squadron

Lake City Air Force Station, Tennessee, 6 February-5 August 1952

- 664th Aircraft Control and Warning Squadron

Bellefontaine Air Force Station, Ohio, 1 September 1958 – 1 April 1959

- 665th Aircraft Control and Warning Squadron

Calumet Air Force Station, Michigan, 1 April 1959 – 1 April 1960

- 674th Aircraft Control and Warning Squadron

Osceola Air Force Station, Wisconsin, 1 April-1 July 1959

- 676th Aircraft Control and Warning Squadron

Antigo Air Force Station, Wisconsin, 1 April 1959 – 1 April 1960

- 677th Aircraft Control and Warning Squadron

Alpena Air Force Station, Michigan, 8 July 1956 – 30 November 1957

- 692d Aircraft Control and Warning Squadron

Baudette Air Force Station, Minnesota, 1 April-1 July 1959

- 695th Radar Squadron

Pickstown Air Force Station, South Dakota, 1 April 1966 – 8 September 1968

- 707th Aircraft Control and Warning Squadron

Grand Rapids Air Force Station, Minnesota, 1 April-1 July 1959

- 731st Radar Squadron

Sundance Air Force Station, Wyoming, 1 April 1966 – 18 June 1968

- 738th Radar Squadron

Olathe Air Force Station, Kansas, 1 April 1966 – 8 September 1988

- 752d Aircraft Control and Warning Squadron

Empire Air Force Station, Michigan, 1 April 1959 – 1 April 1960

- 753d Aircraft Control and Warning Squadron

Sault Sainte Marie Air Force Station, Michigan, 1 April 1959 – 1 April 1960

- 754th Aircraft Control and Warning Squadron

Port Austin Air Force Station, Michigan, 6 February 1952 – 16 February 1953

- 755th Radar Squadron

Arlington Heights Air Force Station, Illinois, 1 December 1967 – 1 July 1968

- 756th Aircraft Control and Warning Squadron

Finland Air Force Station, Minnesota, 1 April-1 July 1959

- 763d Aircraft Control and Warning Squadron

Lockport Air Force Station, New York, 8 July 1956 – 1 September 1958

- 781st Aircraft Control and Warning Squadron

Custer Air Force Station, Michigan, 6 February 1952 – 16 February 1953

- 782d Aircraft Control and Warning Squadron

Rockville Air Force Station, Indiana, 6 February 1952 – 16 February 1953

- 784th Aircraft Control and Warning Squadron

Snow Mountain Air Force Station, Kentucky, 6 February 1952 – 16 February 1953

- 787th Radar Squadron

Chandler Air Force Station, Minnesota, 1 April 1966 – 1 July 1968

- 788th Radar Squadron

Waverly Air Force Station, Iowa, 1 December 1967 – 1 July 1968

- 789th Radar Squadron

Omaha Air Force Station, Nebraska, 1 April 1966 – 8 September 1968

- 790th Radar Squadron

Kirksville Air Force Station, Missouri, 1 December 1957 – 8 September 1968

- 791st Radar Squadron

Hanna City Air Force Station, Illinois, 1 December 1967 – 18 June 1968

- 793d Radar Squadron

Hutchinson Air Force Station, Kansas, 1 April 1966 – 8 September 1968

- 798th Radar Squadron

Belleville Air Force Station, Illinois, 1 December 1967 – 18 June 1968

- 809th Aircraft Control and Warning Squadron

Willow Run Airport, Michigan, 26–30 May 1953

- 903d Radar Squadron

Gettysburg Air Force Station, South Dakota, 1 April 1966 – 18 June 1968

- 906th Aircraft Control and Warning Squadron

Willow Run Airport, Michigan, 26–30 May 1953

- 912th Aircraft Control and Warning Squadron

Ramore Air Station, Ontario, 21 December 1952 – 16 February 1953; 8 July 1956 – 1 April 1960

- 913th Aircraft Control and Warning Squadron

Pagwa Air Station, Ontario, 21 December 1952 – 16 February 1953; 1 April 1959 – 1 April 1960

- 914th Aircraft Control and Warning Squadron

Armstrong Air Station, Ontario, 21 December 1952 – 16 February 1953; 1 April-15 November 1969

- 915th Aircraft Control and Warning Squadron

Sioux Lookout Air Station, Ontario, 1 April 1959 – 15 November 1969

== See also ==
- List of United States Air Force Aerospace Defense Command Interceptor Squadrons
- List of United States Air Force air divisions
- United States general surveillance radar stations
