= 915th Aircraft Control and Warning Squadron =

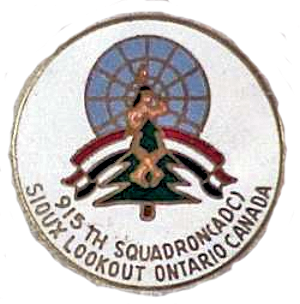
- Emblem of the 915th Aircraft Control and Warning Squadron
- Active: 1952-1962
- Country: United States
- Branch: United States Air Force
- Type: General Radar Surveillance

The 915th Aircraft Control and Warning Squadron is an inactive United States Air Force unit. It was last assigned to the Duluth Air Defense Sector, Air Defense Command, stationed at Sioux Lookout Air Station, Ontario, Canada. It was inactivated on 1 October 1962.

The unit was a General Surveillance Radar squadron providing for the air defense of North America.

== Lineage ==
- Constituted as the 915th Aircraft Control and Warning Squadron

Activated on 10 March 1952
Inactivated on 1 October 1962

== Assignments ==
- 32d Air Division, 10 March 1952
- 31st Air Division, 16 December 1952
- 37th Air Division, 1 January 1959
- 30th Air Division, 1 April 1959
- Duluth Air Defense Sector, 15 November 1959 - 1 October 1962

== Stations ==
- Grenier AFB, New Hampshire, 10 March 1952
- Sioux Lookout Air Station, 5 December 1952 - 1 October 1962
