= 914th Aircraft Control and Warning Squadron =

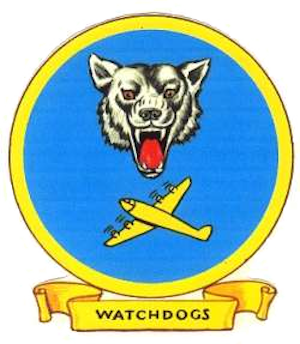
- Emblem of the 914th Aircraft Control and Warning Squadron
- Active: 1952-1963
- Country: United States
- Branch: United States Air Force
- Type: General Radar Surveillance

The 914th Aircraft Control and Warning Squadron is an inactive United States Air Force unit. It was last assigned to the Duluth Air Defense Sector, Air Defense Command, stationed at Armstrong Air Station, Ontario, Canada. It was inactivated on 1 November 1962.

The unit was a General Surveillance Radar squadron providing for the air defense of North America.

== Lineage ==
- Constituted as the 914th Aircraft Control and Warning Squadron

Activated on 10 March 1952
Discontinued on 1 November 1962

== Assignments ==
- 29th Air Division, 10 March 1952
- 30th Air Division, 21 December 1952
- 4708th Defense Wing, 16 February 1953
- 37th Air Division, 8 July 1956
- 30th Air Division, 1 April 1959
- Duluth Air Defense Sector, 15 November 1959 - 1 November 1962

== Stations ==
- Grenier AFB, New Hampshire, 10 March 1952
- Armstrong Air Station, Ontario, Canada, 21 December 1952 - 1 November 1962
