= CFS Armstrong =

Former Canadian General Surveillance Radar station

Canadian Forces Station Armstrong

Site information
- Type: Radar Station
- Code: C-15
- Controlled by: United States Air Force; Royal Canadian Air Force

Location
- Coordinates: 50°18′19″N 089°00′49″W

Site history
- Built: 1952
- Built by: United States Air Force
- In use: 1954-1962,1962-1974

Location of Canadian Forces Station Armstrong, Ontario

For the civil airport, see Armstrong Airport

Canadian Forces Station Armstrong (ADC ID: C-15) is a former General Surveillance Radar station. It is located 1.1 miles (1.8 km) east of Armstrong, Thunder Bay District, Ontario. It was closed in 1974.

It was operated as part of the Pinetree Line network controlled by NORAD.

== History ==
=== Origins ===
There was military activity in Armstrong during the Second World War. The community was the site of a detachment of the US Army's 671st Signal Aircraft Warning Company (Reporting), established to detect an enemy air attack on the locks at Soo Locks in Sault Ste. Marie, Michigan. The site was opened in 1942 and abandoned in 1943 as an attack seemed less likely. It is believed that the facility was situated in the same place as CFS Armstrong and no trace of it remains.

=== Cold War ===
As a result of the Cold War and with the expansion of a North American continental air defence system, Armstrong was selected as a site for a United States Air Force (USAF) radar station, one of the many that would make up the Pinetree Line of Ground-Control Intercept (GCI) radar sites.

This second period began with construction starting in 1952 and completed in 1954. The site was originally known as Armstrong Air Station in the early 1950s and it was home to the USAF's Air Defense Command (ADC) 914th Aircraft Control and Warning Squadron. ADC designated the site "C-15". Initial radars installed were AN/FPS-3C, AN/FPS-502, AN/TPS-502, and an AN/FPS-6B set. The squadron initially reported to the 30th Air Division at Willow Run AFS, Michigan.

As a GCI base, the 914th's role was to guide interceptor aircraft toward unidentified intruders picked up on the unit's radar scopes. These interceptors were based at the 29th Air Division at Great Falls (Malmstrom) AFB, Montana. The squadron was inactivated on 1 November 1962.

On 1 April 1963 Armstrong AS was connected to the Semi Automatic Ground Environment (SAGE) system, and the station became a long-range radar site. It would no longer guide interceptors but only look for enemy aircraft, feeding data to the Duluth Air Defense Sector SAGE DC-10 Data Center of the 30th NORAD Region at Duluth AFS, Minnesota

Later that month, the American station was handed over to the Royal Canadian Air Force and renamed the site as RCAF Station Armstrong. This was part of an arrangement with the United States that came as a result of the cancellation of the Avro Arrow. Canada would lease 66 F-101 Voodoo fighters and take over operation of 12 Pinetree radar bases. The new radar unit, 38 AC&W Squadron, continued in the early warning role. It would later be known as 38 Radar Squadron. It was also upgraded with the following radars:

- Search Radar: AN/FPS-3C, AN/FPS-502, AN/FPS-27
- Height Radar: AN/TPS-502, AN/FPS-6B, AN/FPS-26

Popular by virtue of being the only radio station, CFAO began broadcasting from the trailer court on the station in the early 60's with a 10 watt transmitter. It was run by a core of 20 volunteers offering music and news to the station and surrounding area seven days a week on 1450 kHz. Armstrong had up to three deHavilland Canada Otters operating from the DOT run airfield at any one time. The Otter Flight's duties ranged from logistical support, search and rescue, to "Flying Doctor" services. The "Flying Doctor" service was offered on a weekly and monthly basis to personnel stationed at Pagwa and Sioux Lookout. Medical evacuations were carried out as necessary. Dental services were provided on a bi-monthly visit by a Royal Canadian Army Dental Corps detachment. The station had limited recreational facilities, so hunting and fishing became quite popular, as did snowmobiling.

With unification of the Canadian Forces, the facility was renamed Canadian Forces Station Armstrong in 1967. Improvements in radar technology made the site redundant, and closed on 1 September 1974. CFS Armstrong was disbanded on 1 October 1974.

Later that year the site was sold to private owners and became into a popular gathering area for Armstrong residents. The site included a restaurant and bar, hotel, multiple apartments, garages, and a curling rink. The area, known as D&L, was closed in 1993 and remains abandoned behind the main gate. There is much to see for the ghost town hunter as all but a few buildings remain. A few Radar towers are standing and the airfield is now run by the provincial government.

== See also ==
- List of Royal Canadian Air Force stations
- List of USAF Aerospace Defense Command General Surveillance Radar Stations
