= 543d Aircraft Control and Warning Group =

543d Aircraft Control and Warning Group
- Active: 1950–1952
- Country: United States
- Branch: United States Air Force
- Type: Command and Control radar organization
- Part of: Air Defense Command

The 543d Aircraft Control and Warning Group is a disbanded United States Air Force unit. It was last assigned to the 31st Air Division, Air Defense Command, stationed at Fort Snelling, Minnesota. It was inactivated on 10 February 1952.

== History ==
The unit was a command and control organization of general surveillance radar squadrons providing for the air defense of the United States. The unit was inactivated due to an ADC reorganization, and its assigned radar squadrons were transferred to various air divisions.

=== Lineage ===
- Established as the 543d Aircraft Control and Warning Group

Activated on 8 October 1950
Inactivated on 6 February 1952
Disbanded on 21 September 1984

=== Assignments ===
- 31st Air Division, 8 October 1950
- Central Air Defense Force, 1 January 1951
- 31st Air Division (Defense), 10 July 1951

=== Stations ===
- Fort Snelling, Minnesota, 8 October 1950 – 6 February 1952

=== Subordinate units ===
- 132d Aircraft Control and Warning Squadron (Federalized Minnesota ANG)

Leaf River, Minnesota, 4 June 1951 – 6 February 1952

- 138th Aircraft Control and Warning Squadron (Federalized Colorado ANG)

Rapid City AFB, South Dakota, July 1951 – 6 February 1952

- 673d Aircraft Control and Warning Squadron

Fort Snelling, Minnesota, 8 October 1950 – 6 February 1952

- 674th Aircraft Control and Warning Squadron

Osceola AFS, Wisconsin, 8 October 1950 – 6 February 1952

- 676th Aircraft Control and Warning Squadron

Antigo AFS, Wisconsin, 1 May 1951 – 6 February 1952

- 756th Aircraft Control and Warning Squadron

Finland AFS, Minnesota, December 1950 – 6 February 1952

- 785th Aircraft Control and Warning Squadron,

Finley AFS, North Dakota, 10 April 1951 – 6 February 1952

- 786th Aircraft Control and Warning Squadron

Minot AFS, North Dakota, 20 May 1951 – 6 February 1952

- 787th Aircraft Control and Warning Squadron

Chandler AFS, Minnesota, 27 June 1951 – 6 February 1952

- 788th Aircraft Control and Warning Squadron

Waverly AFS, Iowa, 10 April 1951 – 6 February 1952

- 789th Aircraft Control and Warning Squadron

Omaha AFS, Nebraska, 1 May 1951 – 6 February 1952

- 790th Aircraft Control and Warning Squadron

Kirksville AFS, Missouri, 1 May 1951 – 6 February 1952

- 791st Aircraft Control and Warning Squadron

Hanna City AFS, Illinois, 10 May – 1 July 1951

== See also ==
- List of United States Air Force aircraft control and warning squadrons
