= Eastern Air Defense Force =

- Emblem of the Eastern Air Defense Force
- Active: 1949–1960
- Country: United States
- Branch: United States Air Force
- Role: Air Defense
- Part of: Air Defense Command

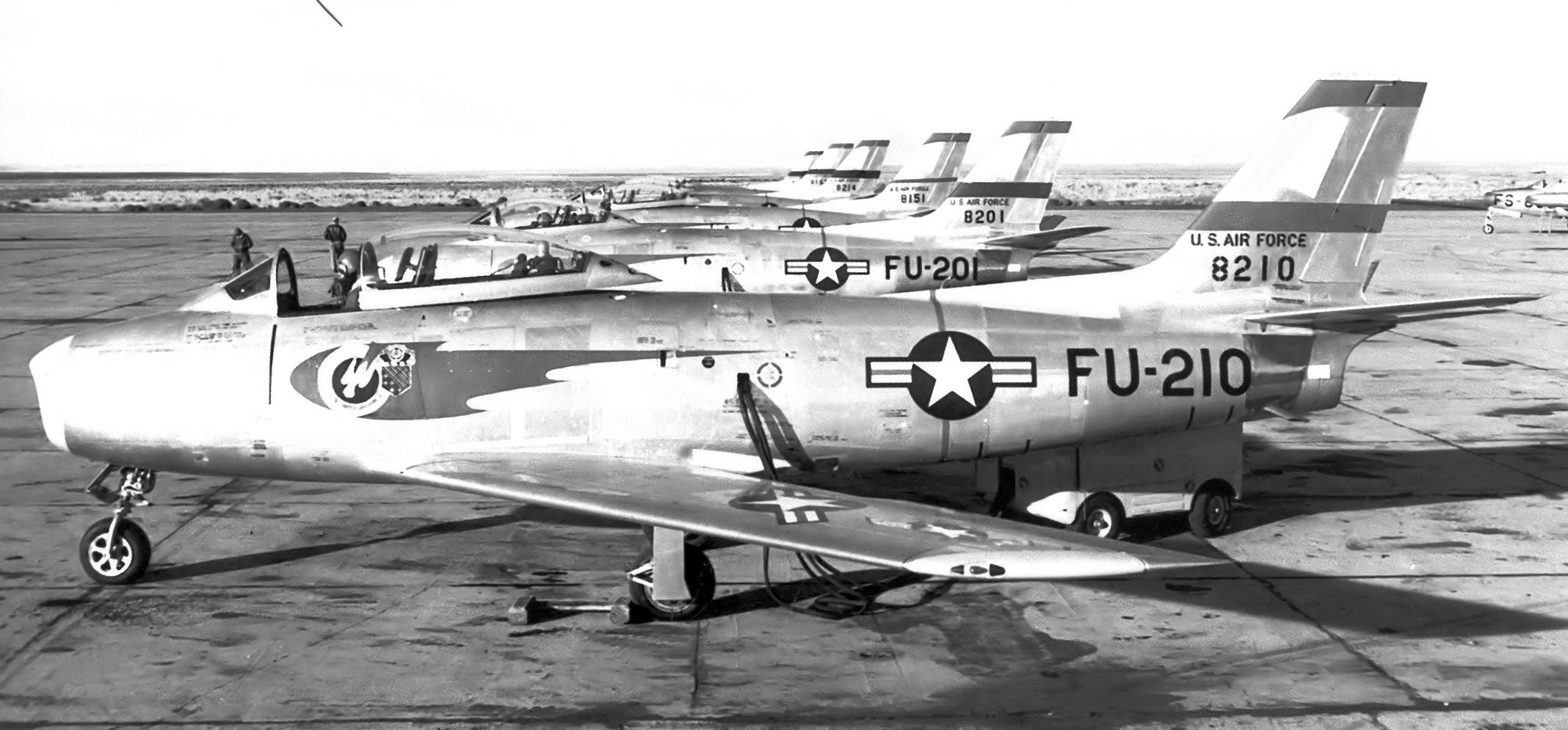
71st Fighter-Interceptor Squadron North American F-86A Sabres attached to EADF, 1950. Aircraft identified: North American F-86A-5-NA Sabre 48-210 North American F-86A-5-NA Sabre 48-201 North American F-86A-5-NA Sabre 48-151

The Eastern Air Defense Force (EADF) is an inactive United States Air Force organization. Its last assignment was with Air Defense Command being stationed at Stewart Air Force Base, New York. It was inactivated on 1 July 1960.

== History ==
EADF was an intermediate-level command and control organization of Air Defense Command. Its origins date to 1 March 1949 when Continental Air Command (ConAC) reorganized Air Defense Command when it became an operating agency. Air defense units within the Continental United States (CONUS) were given to the Eastern and Western Air Defense Liaison Groups, with Western and Eastern Air Defense Forces activated on 1 September 1949.

The command was originally assigned the region within the Continental United States (CONUS) to the east of the 102d degree of longitude, along the Canada–US border to the most easternmost point of Maine; the southern boundary being the 102d degree of longitude along the Rio Grande boundary with Mexico, east to the southernmost point of Texas and along the Gulf of Mexico and Atlantic Ocean coastlines.

This was adjusted in 1951 with the activation of Central Air Defense Force (CADF) with the region being adjusted to the area east of the 90th degree of longitude south to the point of the Missouri, Kentucky and Tennessee state boundaries, and eastward to the Atlantic Ocean coastline along the Tennessee/Kentucky and Virginia/North Carolina border, with all areas north and east of those boundaries. Organizations stationed west and south of that delineation were transferred to CADF.

The delineation was again adjusted in March 1956 to the region generally to the east of the 90th degree of longitude south to the point of the Missouri, Kentucky and Tennessee state boundaries, then south along the Mississippi river to the Gulf of Mexico in the south. CADF organizations in the southeast were reassigned to the EADF.

Eastern Air Defense Force was inactivated on 1 July 1960, with its assigned units reassigned either to 26th, 30th or 32d Air Divisions, or to the new Air Defense Sectors created with the advent of the Semi Automatic Ground Environment (SAGE) system.

=== Lineage ===
- Established as Eastern Air Defense Force and organized 1 September 1949.

Discontinued 1 July 1960

=== Assignments ===
- Continental Air Command, 1 September 1949 – 1 January 1951
- Air Defense Command, 1 January 1951 – 1 July 1960

=== Stations ===
- Mitchel Air Force Base, New York, 1 September 1949 – 1 August 1950
- Stewart Air Force Base, New York, 1 August 1950 – 1 July 1960

=== Components ===
==== Air Divisions ====
- 26th Air Division

Stationed at Roslyn Air Force Station, New York
Re-assigned to Eastern Air Defense Force, 1 September 1950 from First Air Force
Re-designated 26th Air Division (SAGE), 8 August 1958
Moved to Syracuse Air Force Station, New York, 8 August 1958
Re-assigned to Air Defense Command, 1 August 1959

- 30th Air Division

Stationed at Willow Run Air Force Station, Michigan
Re-assigned to Eastern Air Defense Force 1 April 1959 from Air Defense Command
Re-designated 30th Air Division (SAGE), 1 April 1959
Moved to Truax Field, Wisconsin, 1 April 1959
Re-assigned to Air Defense Command, 1 July 1959

- 31st Air Division

Activated at Selfridge Air Force Base, Michigan, 8 October 1950
Assigned to Eastern Air Defense Force
Re-assigned to Air Defense Command, 1 January 1951

- 32d Air Division

Activated at Stewart Air Force Base, New York, 1 January 1951
Assigned to Eastern Air Defense Force
Moved to Syracuse Air Force Station, New York, 1 December 1953
Re-designated 32d Air Division (Defense), 15 August 1958
Re-designated 32d Air Division (SAGE), 15 November 1958
Moved to Dobbins Air Force Base, Georgia, 15 November 1958
Re-assigned to Air Defense Command, 1 August 1959

- 33d Air Division (Defense)

Activated at Tinker Air Force Base, Oklahoma, 19 March 1951
Assigned to Eastern Air Defense Force
Re-assigned to Central Air Defense Force (CADF), 20 May 1951

- 35th Air Division

Stationed at Dobbins Air Force Base, Georgia
Re-assigned to Eastern Air Defense Force, 10 April 1955 from Central Air Defense Force, 10 April 1955
Inactivated 15 November 1958

- 37th Air Division

Stationed at Truax Field, Wisconsin
Re-assigned to Eastern Air Defense Force 8 September 1955 from Air Defense Command
Inactivated 1 April 1959

- 58th Air Division

Activated at Wright-Patterson Air Force Base, Ohio, 8 September 1955
Assigned to Eastern Air Defense Force
Inactivated 1 February 1959

- 85th Air Division

Activated at Andrews Air Force Base, Maryland, 8 September 1955
Assigned to Eastern Air Defense Force
Inactivated 1 September 1958

==== Wings ====
- 23d Fighter-Interceptor Wing

Activated at Presque Isle Air Force Base, Maine, 1 January 1951
Assigned to Eastern Air Defense Force
Inactivated 6 February 1952

- 33d Fighter Wing (Air Defense)

Stationed at Otis Air Force Base, Massachusetts
Re-assigned to Eastern Air Defense Force 1 January 1951 from Air Defense Command
Inactivated 6 February 1952

- 52d Fighter-Interceptor Wing

Stationed at McGuire Air Force Base, New Jersey as 52d Fighter All-Weather Wing
Re-assigned to Eastern Air Defense Force 1 January 1951 from Air Defense Command
Re-designated 52d Fighter-Interceptor Wing, 1 May 1951
Inactivated 6 February 1952

- 56th Fighter-Interceptor Wing

Stationed at Selfridge Air Force Base, Michigan
Re-assigned to Eastern Air Defense Force 1 January 1951 from Air Defense Command
Inactivated 6 February 1952

- 101st Fighter-Interceptor Wing

Federalized Maine Air National Guard, 10 February 1951
Stationed at Dow Air Force Base, Maine
Moved to Grenier Air Force Base, New Hampshire, 1 May 1951
Moved to Larson Air Force Base, Washington and re-assigned to Western Air Defense Force (WADF), 2 August 1951

- 103d Fighter-Interceptor Wing

Federalized Connecticut Air National Guard, 2 March 1951
Stationed at Brainard Field, Connecticut
Moved to Suffolk County Air Force Base, New York, 1 June 1951
Inactivated and returned to state control, 6 February 1952

- 122d Fighter-Interceptor Wing

Federalized Indiana Air National Guard, 10 February 1951
Stationed at Stout Field, Indiana
Moved to Baer Field, Indiana, 1 May 1951
Re-assigned to Central Air Defense Force (CADF), 1 December 1951

- 128th Fighter-Interceptor Wing

Federalized Wisconsin Air National Guard, 10 February 1951
Stationed at General Mitchell Field, Wisconsin
Moved to Truax Field, Wisconsin, 16 February 1951
Re-assigned to Central Air Defense Force, 20 May 1951

- 133d Fighter-Interceptor Wing

Federalized Minnesota Air National Guard, 10 February 1951
Stationed at Holman Field, Minnesota
Re-assigned to Central Air Defense Force 20 May 1951

- 142d Fighter-Interceptor Wing

Federalized Oregon Air National Guard
Stationed at Geiger Field, Washington
Re-assigned to Eastern Air Defense Force from Western Air Defense Force (WADF), 11 April 1951
Moved to O'Hare International Airport, Illinois, 1 May 1951
Inactivated and returned to state control, 6 February 1952

- 551st Airborne Early Warning and Control Wing

Stationed at Otis Air Force Base, Massachusetts
Re-assigned to Eastern Air Defense Force from 8th Air Division (AEW&Con), 1 July 1957
Re-assigned to 26th Air Division, 1 July 1959

- 4621st Air Defense Wing (SAGE)

Stationed at McGuire Air Force Base, New Jersey
Activated by Eastern Air Defense Force on 1 April 1956
Re-assigned to 26th Air Division, 18 October 1956

- 4622d Air Defense Wing (SAGE)

Stationed at Stewart Air Force Base, New York
Activated by Eastern Air Defense Force on 1 June 1956
Re-assigned to 26th Air Division, 18 October 1956

- 4706th Air Defense Wing

Stationed at O'Hare International Airport, Illinois
Activated by Eastern Air Defense Force on 1 February 1952
Re-assigned to 30th Air Division, 16 February 1953

- 4708th Air Defense Wing

Stationed at Selfridge Air Force Base, Michigan
Activated by Eastern Air Defense Force on 1 February 1953
Re-assigned to 30th Air Division, 16 February 1953

- 4709th Defense Wing

Stationed at McGuire Air Force Base, New Jersey
Activated by Eastern Air Defense Force on 1 February 1952
Re-assigned to 26th Air Division, 16 February 1953

- 4710th Defense Wing

Stationed at New Castle Air Force Base, Delaware
Activated by Eastern Air Defense Force on 1 February 1952
Re-assigned to 26th Air Division, 16 February 1953

- 4711th Defense Wing

Stationed at Presque Isle Air Force Base, Maine
Activated by Eastern Air Defense Force on 1 February 1952
Re-assigned to 32d Air Division, 16 February 1953

==== Groups ====
- 152d Aircraft Control and Warning Group

Federalized New Hampshire Air National Guard, 1 September 1951
Stationed at Grenier Air Force Base, New Hampshire
Assigned to Eastern Air Defense Force
Re-assigned to 32d Air Division, 6 February 1952

- 156th Aircraft Control and Warning Group

Federalized Michigan Air National Guard, 16 September 1951
Stationed at Selfridge Air Force Base, Michigan
Headquarters remained at Selfridge Air Force Base, personnel deployed to locations in the Chicago, Illinois area
Inactivated and returned to state control, 6 February 1952

- 4700th Air Defense Group

Stationed at Stewart Air Force Base, New York
Re-assigned to Eastern Air Defense Force from Air Defense Command, 1 January 1951
Re-assigned to 4709th Air Defense Wing, 20 September 1954

==== Squadron ====
- 614th Aircraft Control and Warning Squadron

Stationed at: Grenier Air Force Base, New Hampshire. 1 July 1952 – 1 December 1952

== See also ==
- Central Air Defense Force
- Western Air Defense Force
