= Joint Surveillance System =

System for air defense of North America

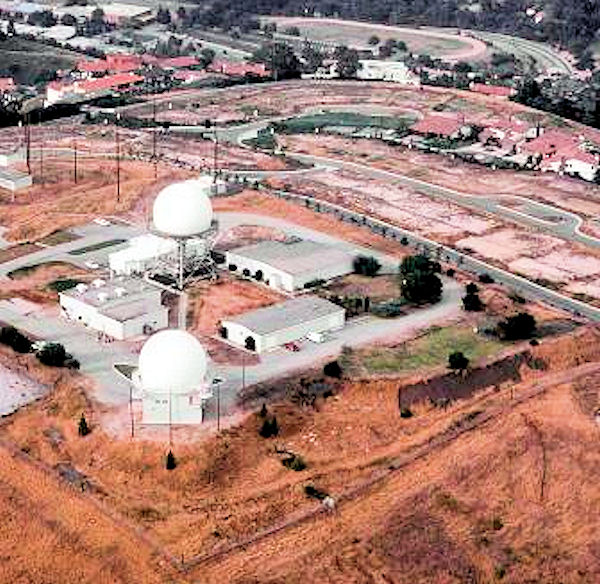
The former J-31 San Pedro JSS ARSR-1 radar site, California

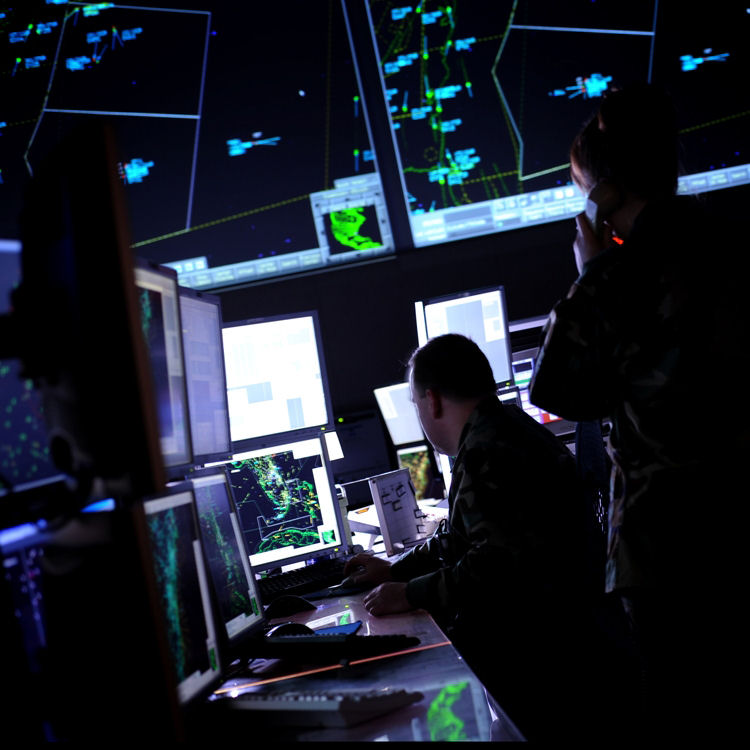
USAF Battle Control System operators monitor the skies from the floor of the program's Eastern Air Defense Sector location.

The Joint Surveillance System (JSS) is a joint United States Air Force and Federal Aviation Administration system for the atmospheric air defense of North America. It replaced the Semi Automatic Ground Environment (SAGE) system in 1983.

== Overview ==
The JSS consists of long range surveillance radars, primarily operated and maintained by the Federal Aviation Administration (FAA), but providing communication and radar data to both FAA and United States Air Force control centers.

=== Air Route Surveillance Radar ===
FAA equipment is primarily a mixture of Long Range Air Route Surveillance Radars (ARSR) of various types, although some use legacy AN/FPS radars. They are co-located with UHF ground-air-ground (G/A/G) transmitter/receiver (GATR) facilities at many locations. Fourteen sites have VHF radios as well. The GATR facility provides radio access to fighters and Airborne early warning and control (AEW&C) aircraft from the Sector Operations Control Centers. The JSS has been enhanced under the FAA/Air Force Radar Replacement Program with 44 ARSR-4/FPS-130 radars to replace some of the many previous long-range radars. This provides common, high-performance, unattended radars. The ARSR-4/FPS-130 is a 3-D long range radar with an effective detection range of some 250 miles and has been fully integrated with JSS at all joint use sites.

These radars are generally unattended except for periodic FAA maintenance crews which visit the sites as necessary. Hence, the 117 was also known as "minimally attended radar" (MAR).

=== Sector Operations Control Centers ===
The USAF Air Combat Command portion of the JSS is composed of three Continental United States (CONUS) Sector Operations Control Centers (SOCC) equipped with Battle Control System-Fixed (BCS-F) displays. Three of the SOCCs are located in the Continental United States (CONUS) at the following locations:

- Rome, New York 43°13′00″N 075°24′21″W (Eastern Air Defense Sector)
- Tyndall AFB, Florida 30°04′30″N 085°35′39″W (Air Operations Center for AFNORTH)
- McChord Field, Washington 47°07′18″N 122°30′14″W (Western Air Defense Sector)

A SOCC is located in Alaska at Elmendorf AFB, in Hawaii at Wheeler Field and two in Canada at CFB North Bay, Ontario. The mission of the SOCC network is peacetime air sovereignty and surveillance. Wartime functions are available if necessary. The SOCCs accept data from multiple sensors, automatically process this data and display data for detection, tracking and identification of air targets, and the assignment and direction of interceptor aircraft to ensure peacetime air sovereignty.

Each SOCC functions as the primary command and control center in each NORAD region during crisis or attack as long as they are capable.

CONUS SOCCs receive data from 46 JSS radar sites. Radar sites of the Alaska Radar System feeds data to Elmendorf AFB, Alaska and two radar sites supply data for the SOCC at Hickam Field, Hawaii. Radars from the North Warning System network in Canada and the Canadian Coastal Radar System feed data to two Canadian SOCCs located at CFB North Bay, Ontario.

Command and control can be transitioned to the E-3 Airborne early warning and control (AEW&C) for survivability as the tactical situation warrants. In peacetime, six of these aircraft are assigned to co-operate with the JSS. Information from the Regional Operations Control Center (ROCC) at Joint Base Elmendorf–Richardson, Alaska, is also passed to the North American Air Defense Command (NORAD) Combat Operations Center (COC) in Colorado Springs, Colorado.

== Radar stations ==
see also: Alaska Radar System and Hawaii Region Air Operations Center

Site Number	NORAD-ID	Name	State	Radar Type	Location	USAF Sector	FAA Sector	Notes
QPC		Haleyville	AL	AN/FPS-67B	34°24′56″N 087°32′23″W	EADS	ASO Southern	Radar developed by Raytheon for SAGE system.
MGM		Montgomery	AL	ARSR-1D	32°12′42″N 086°10′06″W	EADS	ASO Southern	In rural area, 13.2 miles (21.2 km) southeast of Montgomery.
QXR	Z-237	Russellville	AR	AN/FPS-64A	35°24′10″N 092°59′39″W	WADS	ASW Southwest	Former ADCOM SAGE radar site, still uses the FPS-64A.
TXK		Texarkana	AR	AN/FPS-67B	33°21′35″N 093°55′22″W	WADS	ASW Southwest	Replaced ADCOM SAGE Texarkana AFS M-91 site
PHX	Z-247	Humboldt Mountain, Phoenix ARSR	AZ	ARSR-1E	33°58′53″N 111°47′53″W		AWP WESTERN PACIFIC	Opened 1958 at Forest Ranger Lookout site.
J-29A		Ajo	AZ	ARSR-4	32°25′52″N 112°56′42″W	WADS	ASW Southwest	Opened 2000 at former ADCOM Ajo AFS site, replaced J-29 near Phoenix
QXP		Seligman	AZ	ARSR-3	35°21′10″N 112°56′59″W	WADS	AWP Western Pacific	Remote site on top of mountain peak.
J-83	Z-33	Crescent City	CA		41°33′33″N 124°05′10″W		AWP Western Pacific	Former ADCOM Klamath AFS, Closed 1995, replaced by J-83A
J-83A		Rainbow Ridge	CA	ARSR-4	40°23′39″N 124°09′58″W	WADS	AWP Western Pacific	Replaced J-83 and J-34. Remote site on top of mountain peak.
J-34	Z-37	Point Arena	CA		38°53′35″N 123°32′40″W		AWP Western Pacific	Former ADCOM SAGE Point Arena AFS, closed 1995. Replaced by J-83A
QMV	Z-38	Mill Valley	CA	ARSR-4	37°55′26″N 122°35′51″W	WADS	AWP Western Pacific	Former ADCOM SAGE Mill Valley AFS, inactivated 1980. Now FAA site.
J-32	Z-236	Paso Robles	CA	ARSR-4	35°23′41″N 120°21′15″W	WADS	AWP Western Pacific	FAA site since 1960. Former USAF SAGE site Z-236, replacing Cambria AFS, Became JSS site in 1980
J-31	Z-39	San Pedro	CA		33°44′46″N 118°20′10″W		AWP Western Pacific	Former ADCOM San Pedro Hill AFS inactivated 1995. JSS site closed, replaced by Navy ARSR-4 site J-36A on San Clemente Island.
J-36A		San Clemente Island (USN)	CA	ARSR-4	32°53′03″N 118°27′03″W	WADS	AWP Western Pacific	New site established in late 1990s located on very remote location.
J-30	Z-76	Mount Laguna	CA	ARSR-4	32°52′34″N 116°24′54″W	WADS	AWP Western Pacific	Replaced ADCOM Mount Laguna AFS inactivated 1991. Second ARSR-4 installation
J-35		Vandenberg AFB	CA	ARSR-4	34°35′13″N 120°35′41″W	WADS		USAF JSS site (not used by the FAA)
DNV	Z-212	Denver	CO	ARSR-1D	39°35′39″N 104°41′35″W	WADS	ANM Northwest Mountain	Opened in 1963 by FAA, was data tied-into the ADCOM SAGE network.
GJC	Z-215	Grand Junction	CO	ARSR-2	39°38′19″N 108°45′45″W	WADS	ANM Northwest Mountain	Opened in 1963 by FAA, was data tied-into the ADCOM SAGE network.
TCO	Z-222	Trinidad	CO	ARSR-2	37°32′49″N 104°00′50″W	WADS	ANM Northwest Mountain	Opened in 1963 by FAA, was data tied-into the ADCOM SAGE network.
J-04	Z-327	Whitehouse NOLF	FL	ARSR-4	30°20′45″N 081°52′25″W	EADS	ASO Southern	Replaced ADCOM M-114 SAGE site at NAS Jacksonville inactivated 1981.
J-05	Z-211	Patrick AFB	FL		28°12′50″N 080°35′57″W		ASO Southern	Former ADCOM SAGE site, inactivated 1988. Used until 1996 by FAA.
J-05A		Melbourne	FL	ARSR-4	28°05′03″N 080°47′53″W	WADS	ASO Southern	Replaced J-05 with new ARSR-4 installation.
J-06	Z-210	Richmond	FL	ARSR-1F	25°37′24″N 080°24′16″W		ASO Southern	Former ADCOM Richmond AFS, closed 1992, destroyed by Hurricane Andrew
J-06A		Tamiami	FL	ARSR-4	25°38′50″N 080°30′19″W	EADS	ASO Southern	Replaced destroyed J-06 by FAA at new location with ARSR-4 radar.
J-07	Z-209	NAS Key West	FL	ARSR-4	24°35′04″N 081°41′21″W	EADS	ASO Southern	ADCOM SAGE site closed 1979, now joint-use Navy/FAA radar
J-09	Z-330	Fort Lonesome	FL		27°38′44″N 082°07′58″W		ASO Southern	Opened in 1980 replacing ADCOM SAGE site M-129 at MacDill AFB. Closed 1998
J-09A		Fort Green	FL	ARSR-4	27°42′02″N 082°00′25″W	EADS	ASO Southern	In agricultural area 32.9 miles (52.9 km) east-southeast of Tampa.
J-10	Z-333	Cross City	FL	ARSR-4	29°44′38″N 083°00′03″W	EADS	ASO Southern	New site opened in 1980 replaced ADCOM SAGE Cross City AFS TM-200.
J-11	Z-198	Tyndall AFB	FL	ARSR-4	30°04′33″N 085°36′39″W	EADS	ASO Southern	Opened in 1983, replaced ADCOM TM-198 site on the base.
QHN		Ashburn	GA	ARSR-1E	31°41′45″N 083°45′01″W	EADS	ASO Southern	In rural location, 25.2 miles (40.6 km) east-northeast of Albany, GA
QNK		Lincolnton	GA	ARSR-3	33°45′35″N 082°28′01″W	EADS	ASO Southern	Replaced ADCOM SAGE site at Aiken AFS, South Carolina (SM-159)
QJO		Arlington	IA	ARSR-3	42°46′06″N 091°36′55″W	WADS	ACE Central	In rural location, 41.7 miles (67.1 km) east-northeast of Waterloo, IA
QVA		Ashton	ID	ARSR-2	44°33′45″N 111°26′41″W	WADS	ANM Northwest Mountain	Opened 1963. On Sawtell Peak 2.3 miles (3.7 km) south-southwest of Yellowstone National Park Airport, ID
BOI	Z-223	Boise	ID	ARSR-2	44°26′33″N 116°08′13″W	WADS	ANM Northwest Mountain	Opened in 1963 by FAA. Located atop Snowbank Mountain. Began feeding information into the ADCOM SAGE network in 1963.
JOL		Elwood	IL	ARSR-3	41°25′22″N 088°03′30″W	EADS	AGL Great Lakes	In rural location, 7.2 miles (11.6 km) south of Joilet, IL
QUZ	Z-63	Hanna City	IL	ARSR	40°41′56″N 089°49′33″W	EADS	AGL Great Lakes	FAA site since 1969, former Hanna City AFS
IND		Indianapolis	IN	ARSR-1E	39°44′46″N 086°17′05″W	EADS	AGL Great Lakes	In urban area, 2.3 miles (3.7 km) north of Indianapolis International Airport; 7102 Howard St, Indianapolis, IN 46241
QTZ		La Grange	IN	ARSR-1E	41°37′52″N 085°24′53″W	EADS	AGL Great Lakes	Located in suburbs, 1 mile (1.6 km) south of La Grange, IN.
GCK	Z-226	Garden City	KS	ARSR-2	37°39′51″N 100°52′18″W	WADS	ACE Central	FAA site since 1964 in highly agricultural area, was data tied-into the ADCOM SAGE network. 21.3 miles (34.3 km) south of Garden City, KS.
QBZ		Oskaloosa	KS	ARSR-2	39°13′19″N 095°14′46″W	WADS	ACE Central	In rural area, 17.3 miles (27.8 km) north of Lawrence, KS.
J-14	Z-248	Lake Charles AFS	LA		30°11′05″N 093°10′30″W		ASW Southwest	Former ADCOM SAGE site at former Lake Charles AFB. Closed in the 1990s and moved to J-14A
J-14A		Lake Charles	LA	ARSR-4	30°21′38″N 093°30′41″W	WADS	ASW Southwest	New site located in rural area 23.5 miles (37.8 km) east-northeast of former site.
J-13	Z-246	Slidell	LA	ARSR-4	30°20′53″N 089°46′46″W	EADS	ASW Southwest	Former ADCOM SAGE site, on north side of Lake Pontchartrain, 32.5 miles (52.3 km) north-northeast of New Orleans
QHA		Cummington	MA	AN/FPS-66B	42°28′29″N 072°58′05″W	EADS	ANE New England	Located atop Bryant Mountain. Using ADCOM SAGE radar.
J-53	Z-10	North Truro	MA	ARSR-4	42°02′03″N 070°03′15″W	EADS	ANE New England	On former ADCOM North Truro AFS closed in 1994.
J-54	Z-110	Bucks Harbor	ME	ARSR-4	44°37′46″N 067°23′43″W	EADS	ANE New England	On former ADCOM Bucks Harbor AFS closed in 1979
J-63		Caribou	ME	ARSR-4	46°53′09″N 067°58′17″W	EADS	ANE New England	Former Army Nike IFC L-58C of Loring AFB Defense Area. It was run by personnel from the 2192nd Communication Squadron.
CPV		Coopersville	MI	AN/FPS-66	43°02′44″N 085°59′32″W	EADS	AGL Great Lakes	Using ADCOM SAGE Radar
J-58	Z-34	Empire	MI	ARSR-4	44°48′07″N 086°03′05″W	EADS	AGL Great Lakes	Former ADCOM Empire AFS. Became a USAF-FAA joint-use site in 1964, USAF inactivated 1978
J-62	Z-397	Canton	MI	ARSR-4	42°16′36″N 083°28′27″W	EADS	AGL Great Lakes	First, was a temporary data-tie (Z-61 radar change-out). Now a permanent data-tie site in the JSS, replacing Port Austin AFS (Z-61/J-57).
QJE		Minneapolis	MN	ARSR-1E	44°45′09″N 093°13′40″W	WADS	AGL Great Lakes	Located 10.8 miles (17.4 km) south-southwest of Minneapolis-Saint Paul International Airport in urban area. Address is 13591 Harwell Path Apple Valley, MN 55124
J-60	Z-306	Nashwauk	MN	ARSR-4	47°23′51″N 093°10′13″W	WADS	AGL Great Lakes	New FAA/USAF JSS radar site; replaced Finland AFS, MN (Z-69) and Baudette AFS, MN (Z-132).
QJC		Tyler	MN	ARSR-2	44°11′37″N 096°12′15″W	WADS	AGL Great Lakes	In rural area of southwest Minnesota, 154.7 miles (249.0 km) west-southwest of Minneapolis.
STL		St. Louis	MO	ARSR-1E	38°42′03″N 090°23′26″W	WADS	ACE Central	In urban area, address is 2310 Ashby Rd St Louis, MO 63114
QMH		Newport	MS	ARSR-3	32°56′51″N 089°50′41″W	EADS	ASO Southern	In very rural area
J-77	Z-147	Malmstrom AFB	MT		47°30′05″N 111°12′11″W		ANM Northwest Mountain	ADCOM site closed 1996, Moved to J-77A.
J-77A		Bootlegger Ridge	MT	ARSR-4	47°36′49″N 111°17′25″W	WADS	ANM Northwest Mountain	Replacement JSS site for Malmstrom AFB radar site (Z-147 / J-77); Bootlegger Ridge ARSR-4 site is about 7 miles northeast of Great Falls.
J-78	Z-179	Lakeside (Kalispell)	MT	ARSR-4	48°00′41″N 114°21′54″W	WADS	ANM Northwest Mountain	Located at former ADCOM Kalispell AFS.
QRL		Benson	NC	ARSR-1E	35°30′40″N 078°32′56″W	EADS	ASO Southern	FAA long-range radar site. Also known as Raleigh. Once considered as the JSS replacement for the ADCOM SAGE Fort Fisher AFS, NC (Z-115).
QRM		Charlotte	NC	ARSR-1	35°36′39″N 081°14′18″W	EADS	ASO Southern	In rural area, 10.2 miles (16.4 km) southeast of Hickory, NC
J-02	Z-115	Fort Fisher	NC	ARSR-4	33°58′38″N 077°54′56″W	EADS	ASO Southern	Fort Fisher AFS was an active ADCOM site until 1988; FAA site at former GATR facility.
J-75	Z-303	Finley	ND	ARSR-4	47°31′42″N 097°54′03″W	WADS	AGL Great Lakes	Opened November 1979 at new JSS site, replacing the original Finley AFS, ND (Z-29). [Located at old GATR site, ~ a mile or so WNW of the former USAF radar site.]
J-76	Z-300	Watford City	ND	ARSR-4	47°40′44″N 103°46′50″W	WADS	AGL Great Lakes	New FAA/USAF JSS radar site; replaced Fortuna AFS, ND (Z-27), Minot AFS, ND (Z-28), & Opheim AFS, MT (Z-26). Site is located at the former Alexander, ND, gap-filler radar site, Z-177B / Z-28E.
QHO	Z-71	Omaha	NE	ANFPS-67A	41°21′37″N 96°1′30″W	WADS	ACE Central	FAA site since 1968, former Omaha Air Force Station
NPL	Z-217	North Platte	NE	ARSR-2	40°49′58″N 100°44′53″W	WADS	ACE Central	FAA site since 1963, Former ADCOM SAGE site Z-217
J-51	Z-63	Gibbsboro	NJ	ARSR-4	39°49′29″N 074°57′15″W	EADS	AEA Eastern	Former ADCOM Gibbsboro AFS. USAF site closed 1984
GAL	Z-221	Gallup	NM	ARSR-2	36°04′33″N 108°51′37″W	WADS	ASW Southwest	Opened 1963 by FAA. Former ADCOM SAGE site Z-221. Also known as Farmington, NM; located above Washington Pass, north of Gallup.
QWC	Z-234	Mesa Rica	NM	ARSR-1E	35°14′15″N 104°12′16″W	WADS	ASW Southwest	Former ADCOM SAGE site Z-234.
J-28	Z-245	Silver City	NM		32°59′21″N 108°57′38″W		ASW Southwest	Closed 1990s Located atop Brushy Mountain. Part of the 1972 Southern Air Defense System. Now replaced by new ARSR-4 JSS site at Deming, NM (J-28A).
J-28A		Deming	NM	ARSR-4	32°29′30″N 107°09′59″W	WADS	ASW Southwest	Replaced JSS site at Silver City, NM (Z-245 / J-28).
BTM	Z-214	Battle Mountain	NV	ARSR-2	40°24′11″N 116°52′04″W	WADS	AWP Western Pacific	Located on top of Mount Lewis, south of Battle Mountain. Earlier known as Elko.
J-52	Z-315	Riverhead	NY	ARSR-4	40°52′43″N 072°41′14″W	EADS	AEA Eastern	'New' FAA/USAF JSS radar site; replaced Montauk AFS, LI, NY (Z-45).
J-55	Z-312	Remsen	NY	ARSR-4	43°20′43″N 075°14′56″W	EADS	AEA Eastern	New FAA/USAF JSS radar site; replaced Watertown AFS, NY (Z-49). Also called 'Starr Hill.
J-56	Z-309	Dansville	NY	ARSR-1E	42°38′18″N 077°39′10″W	EADS	AEA Eastern	Replaced Lockport AFS, NY (Z-21).
QDB		Brecksville	OH	ARSR-1E	41°18′08″N 081°41′01″W	EADS	AGL Great Lakes	Located 13.7 miles (22.0 km) south of Cleveland.
QWO		London	OH	ARSR-1E	39°50′46″N 083°28′54″W	EADS	AGL Great Lakes	Located 3.3 miles (5.3 km) southwest of London, OH.
OEX		Oklahoma City	OK	ARSR-4	35°24′11″N 097°37′42″W	WADS	ASW Southwest	FAA ARSR-4 Training Site. Located about a mile west of the Will Rogers World Airport.
QVN		Fossil	OR	ARSR-3	44°57′37″N 119°57′06″W	WADS	ANM Northwest Mountain	On remote mountaintop, 138.3 miles (222.6 km) east-southeast of Portland, OR
J-81	Z-345	Salem	OR	ARSR-4	44°55′22″N 123°34′25″W	WADS	ANM Northwest Mountain	Former ADCOM SAGE site. Also known as Laurel Mtn. and Dallas, OR. New FAA/USAF JSS radar site; replaced Mount Hebo AFS, OR (Z-100). FPS-90 came from Keno AFS, OR (Z-180); modified to FPS-116. First operational JSS site in the 25th NORAD Region, 1 May 1979, as OL AJ / 25th ADS.
QCF		Clearfield	PA	ARSR-3	41°04′13″N 078°33′01″W	EADS	AEA Eastern	Located 6.1 miles (9.8 km) west of Clearfield, PA in rural area.
J-61		Trevose	PA	ARSR-1	40°08′03″N 074°59′13″W		AEA Eastern	Temporary data-tie (during the Gibbsboro AFS {Z-63} JSS radar change-out). Then became a 'permanent' replacement for Z-63 until Gibbsboro re-opened with its ARSR-4 and closed in mid 1990s.
J-03	Z-324	Jedburg	SC	ARSR-4	33°04′11″N 080°13′14″W	EADS	ASO Southern	Replaced North Charleston AFS, SC (Z-113).
QOJ	Z-235	Joelton	TN	ARSR-1E	36°20′10″N 086°51′41″W	EADS	ASO Southern	Former ADCOM Joelton AFS closed in 1961 and taken over by FAA.
QYB	Z-233	Memphis	TN	ARSR-1	34°51′10″N 089°45′57″W	EADS	ASO Southern	Former ADCOM SAGE Site Z-233.
QYS		Rogers	TX	ARSR-1E	30°56′38″N 097°16′07″W	WADS	ASW Southwest	In rural area, 2.7 miles (4.3 km) west-northwest of Rogers, TX
J-27	Z-244	El Paso	TX		31°40′51″N 106°11′50″W	WADS	ASW Southwest	Located in Horizon City, TX. Activated in 1963 part of Southern Air Defense System. Closed in 1997, replaced by new ARSR-4 JSS sites at Eagle Peak, TX (J-27A) and at Deming, NM (J-28A).
J-27A		Eagle Peak	TX	ARSR-4	30°55′13″N 105°05′09″W	WADS	ASW Southwest	New site opened in late 1990s replacing J-27, 101.1 miles (162.7 km) SE of El Paso, TX in remote location on top of mountain.
J-15	Z-240	Ellington AFB	TX		29°36′56″N 095°10′23″W	WADS	ASW Southwest	ADCOM SAGE site closed in 1979. FAA took over, closed 1997. Now replaced by new ARSR-4 JSS site at Morales, TX (J-15A).
FTW	Z-231	Keller	TX	ARSR-1D	32°56′40″N 097°13′13″W	WADS	ASW Southwest	Also known as Fort Worth. Opened in 1960s, still using ARSR-1D.
J-15A		Morales	TX	ARSR-4	29°20′29″N 096°52′18″W	WADS	ASW Southwest	Replaced Ellington ANGB, TX, radar site (Z-240/J-15), 111.3 miles (179.1 km) north-northeast of Corpus Christi, TX
J-26	Z-242	Odessa	TX		32°33′15″N 102°25′40″W		ASW Southwest	Closed 1995, replaced by new ARSR-4 JSS site at King Mountain, TX (J-26A).
J-26A		King Mountain	TX	ARSR-4	31°17′06″N 102°16′24″W	WADS	ASW Southwest	Replaced JSS site at Odessa / Andrews, TX (Z-243/J-26); located in remote West Texas.
J-16	Z-242	Oilton	TX	ARSR-4	27°29′56″N 098°58′10″W	WADS	ASW Southwest	Opened in 1972 as part of the Southern Air Defense System (SADS); Later ADCOM site 630th RADS OL-B, inactivated 31 December 1977.
J-25	Z-339	Sonora	TX	ARSR-3	30°28′16″N 100°33′29″W		ASW Southwest	Former ADCOM SAGE site, closed 1995, Now replaced by Rocksprings, TX, ARSR-4 JSS site (J-25A).
J-25A		Rocksprings	TX	ARSR-4	30°02′48″N 100°16′04″W	WADS	ASW Southwest	Replaced JSS Site at Sonora, TX (J-25).
CDR	Z-216	Cedar City	UT	ARSR-2	37°35′35″N 112°51′49″W	WADS	ANM Northwest Mountain	Opened in 1962 by FAA
SLC	Z-213	Francis Peak	UT	ARSR-1E	41°01′58″N 111°50′18″W	WADS	ANM Northwest Mountain	Opened in 1962 by FAA. Also called "Salt Lake City"
QHZ		Horicon	WI	ARSR-2	43°26′45″N 088°29′32″W	EADS	AGL Great Lakes	In central Wisconsin in primarily agricultural area.
QBN		Binns Hall	VA	ARSR-3	37°22′58″N 076°59′55″W	EADS	AEA Eastern	Once considered as the JSS replacement for Cape Charles AFS, VA (Z-56).
J-01	Z-321	NAS Oceana	VA	ARSR-4	36°49′38″N 076°00′49″W	EADS	AEA Eastern	Former ADCOM SAGE site, now FAA/USAF/Navy JSS radar site; replaced Cape Charles AFS, VA (Z-56).
J-50	Z-318	The Plains	VA	ARSR-3	38°52′57″N 077°42′10″W	EADS	AEA Eastern	Opened in 1980. Replaced the ADCOM radar site at Fort Meade, MD (Z-227) and the FAA radar site at Suitland, MD.
J-79	Z-151	Mica Peak	WA	ARSR-4	47°34′26″N 117°04′52″W	WADS	ANM Northwest Mountain	Former ADCOM Mica Peak AFS (SM-151), deactivated in July 1975. Site transferred to FAA.
J-80	Z-44	Makah	WA	ARSR-4	48°22′18″N 124°40′30″W	WADS	ANM Northwest Mountain	Former ADCOM Makah AFS (P-44), closed in 1982. Now USAF/FAA JSS site.
QSI	Z-224	Lovell	WY	ARSR-2	44°49′01″N 107°54′08″W	WADS	ANM Northwest Mountain	Located on Medicine Mountain. Earlier known as Cody.
LSK	Z-219	Lusk	WY	ARSR-2	42°35′38″N 104°35′18″W	WADS	ANM Northwest Mountain	Opened in 1963 by FAA
RKS	Z-218	Rock Springs	WY	ARSR-2	41°26′05″N 109°07′03″W	WADS	ANM Northwest Mountain	Opened in 1962 by FAA

== See also ==
- North Warning System
