= Central Air Defense Force =

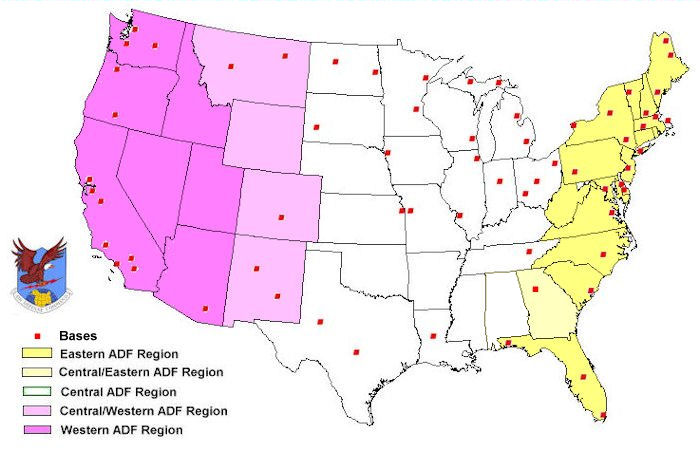
- Regions of ADC Air Defense Forces and known Air Force Bases with ADC units, 1949–1960 Note: States containing ADC bases of Western & Central ADF and Eastern & Central ADF identified as Central/Western and Central/Eastern
- Active: 1951–1960
- Country: United States
- Branch: United States Air Force
- Role: Air Defense
- Part of: Air Defense Command

The Central Air Defense Force (CADF) is an inactive United States Air Force organization. Its last assignment was with Air Defense Command being stationed at Richards-Gebaur Air Force Base, Missouri. It was inactivated on 1 July 1960.

== History ==
CADF was an intermediate-level command and control organization of Air Defense Command. Its origins date to 1 March 1949 when Continental Air Command (ConAC) reorganized Air Defense Command when it became an operating agency. Air defense units within the Continental United States (CONUS) were given to the Eastern and Western Air Defense Liaison Groups, with Western and Eastern Air Defense Forces activated on 1 September 1949.

Central Air Defense Force (CADF) was activated as a third subordinate region under the re-established Air Defense Command in February 1951 to better organize ADC units in the Central and Southeast United States, its initial region being defined in the west as the area east of the 102nd degree of longitude, from the Canada–US border in the north to the Rio Grande border between the United States and Mexico in the south. The eastern boundary of the CADF was the area west of the 90th degree of longitude from the Michigan shoreline of Lake Superior south to the point of the Missouri, Kentucky and Tennessee state boundaries, and eastward to the Atlantic Ocean coastline along the Tennessee–Kentucky and Virginia–North Carolina border, with all areas south and west of those boundaries.

The delineation was again adjusted in March 1956 to the region generally to the east of the 114th degree of longitude, roughly along the eastern borders of Idaho, Nevada and California from the Canada–US border in the north to the Mexican border in the south. The southeast region east of the Mississippi River to the Gulf of Mexico was reassigned to EADF.

Central Air Defense Force was inactivated on 1 July 1960, with its assigned units reassigned either to 29th, 30th or 33rd Air Divisions, or to the new Air Defense Sectors created with the advent of the Semi Automatic Ground Environment (SAGE) system.

== Lineage ==
- Constituted as Central Air Defense Force (CADF) on 5 February 1951

Activated on 1 March 1951
Inactivated on 1 July 1960

=== Assignments ===
- Air Defense Command, 1 February 1951 – 1 July 1960

=== Stations ===
- Kansas City, Missouri, 5 February 1951
- Grandview AFB, Missouri, 24 February 1954

Site re-designated: Richards-Gebaur AFB, Missouri, 27 April 1957 – 1 July 1960

=== Components ===
==== Air Divisions ====
- 20th Air Division

Activated at: Grandview AFB, Missouri on 8 October 1955
Assigned to Central Air Defense Force
Site re-designated: Richards-Gebaur AFB, Missouri, 27 April 1957
Inactivate on 1 July 1960

- 29th Air Division

Stationed at: Great Falls AFB, Montana
Re-assigned to Central Air Defense Force 16 February 1953 from Western Air Defense Force (WADF)
Site re-designated: Malmstrom AFB, 15 June 1956
Re-designated 29th Air Division (SAGE) and reassigned to Air Defense Command, 1 January 1960

- 31st Air Division

Stationed at: Fort Snelling, Minnesota on 20 May 1951
Re-assigned to Central Air Defense Force 16 February 1953 from Eastern Air Defense Force (EADF)
Inactivated 1 January 1960

- 33d Air Division

Stationed at: Tinker AFB, Oklahoma, 20 May 1951
Re-assigned to Central Air Defense Force 16 February 1953 from Eastern Air Defense Force (EADF)
Moved to Oklahoma City AFS, 1 July 1956
Re-designated 33d Air Division (SAGE) and reassigned to Air Defense Command, 1 January 1960

- 34th Air Division (Defense)

Stationed at: Kirtland AFB, New Mexico, 16 February 1953
Re-assigned to Central Air Defense Force 16 February 1953 from Western Air Defense Force (WADF)
Inactivated 1 January 1960

- 35th Air Division

Activated at: Kansas City, Missouri on 1 July 1951
Assigned to Central Air Defense Force
Moved to Dobbins AFB, Georgia on 1 September 1951
Re-assigned to Eastern Air Defense Force (EADF), 10 April 1955

==== Wings ====
- 122d Fighter-Interceptor Wing

Federalized Indiana Air National Guard, 10 February 1951
Stationed at Baer Field, Indiana
Re-assigned to Central Air Defense Force 1 December 1951 from Eastern Air Defense Force (EADF)
Inactivated and returned to state control, 7 February 1952

- 128th Fighter-Interceptor Wing

Federalized Wisconsin Air National Guard, 10 February 1951
Stationed at Truax Field, Wisconsin
Re-assigned to Central Air Defense Force 20 May 1951 from Eastern Air Defense Force (EADF)
Inactivated and returned to state control, 6 February 1952

- 133d Fighter-Interceptor Wing

Federalized Minnesota Air National Guard, 10 February 1951
Stationed at Holman Field, Minnesota
Re-assigned to Central Air Defense Force 20 May 1951 from Eastern Air Defense Force (EADF)
Moved to Minneapolis-Saint Paul International Airport, 28 June 1951
Inactivated and returned to state control, 6 February 1952

==== Groups ====
- 153d Aircraft Control and Warning Group

Federalized Pennsylvania Air National Guard, 16 January 1952
Stationed at New Cumberland, Pennsylvania, assigned to Central Air Defense Force
Personnel used to fill vacancies in the 35th Air Division; inactivated 6 February 1952

- 159th Aircraft Control and Warning Group

Federalized Oklahoma Air National Guard, 1 June 1951
Stationed at Tinker AFB, Oklahoma
Attached to 33d Air Division, 19 June 1951
Inactivated and returned to state control, 6 February 1952

- 161st Aircraft Control and Warning Group

Federalized California Air National Guard, 28 January 1952
Stationed at Berkeley, California, assigned to Central Air Defense Force
Personnel used to fill vacancies in numerous CADF units; inactivated 6 February 1952

- 543d Aircraft Control and Warning Group

Assigned to Central Air Defense Force
Stationed at Fort Snelling, Minnesota on 1 January 1951
Re-assigned to 31st Air Division (Defense), 10 July 1951

- 4676th Air Defense Group

Assigned to Central Air Defense Force
Stationed at Grandview AFB, Missouri
Re-assigned to 33d Air Division, 2 March 1954

== See also ==
- Eastern Air Defense Force
- Western Air Defense Force
