= Duluth Air National Guard Base =

United States Air National Guard base

- Near Duluth, Minnesota in the United States of America
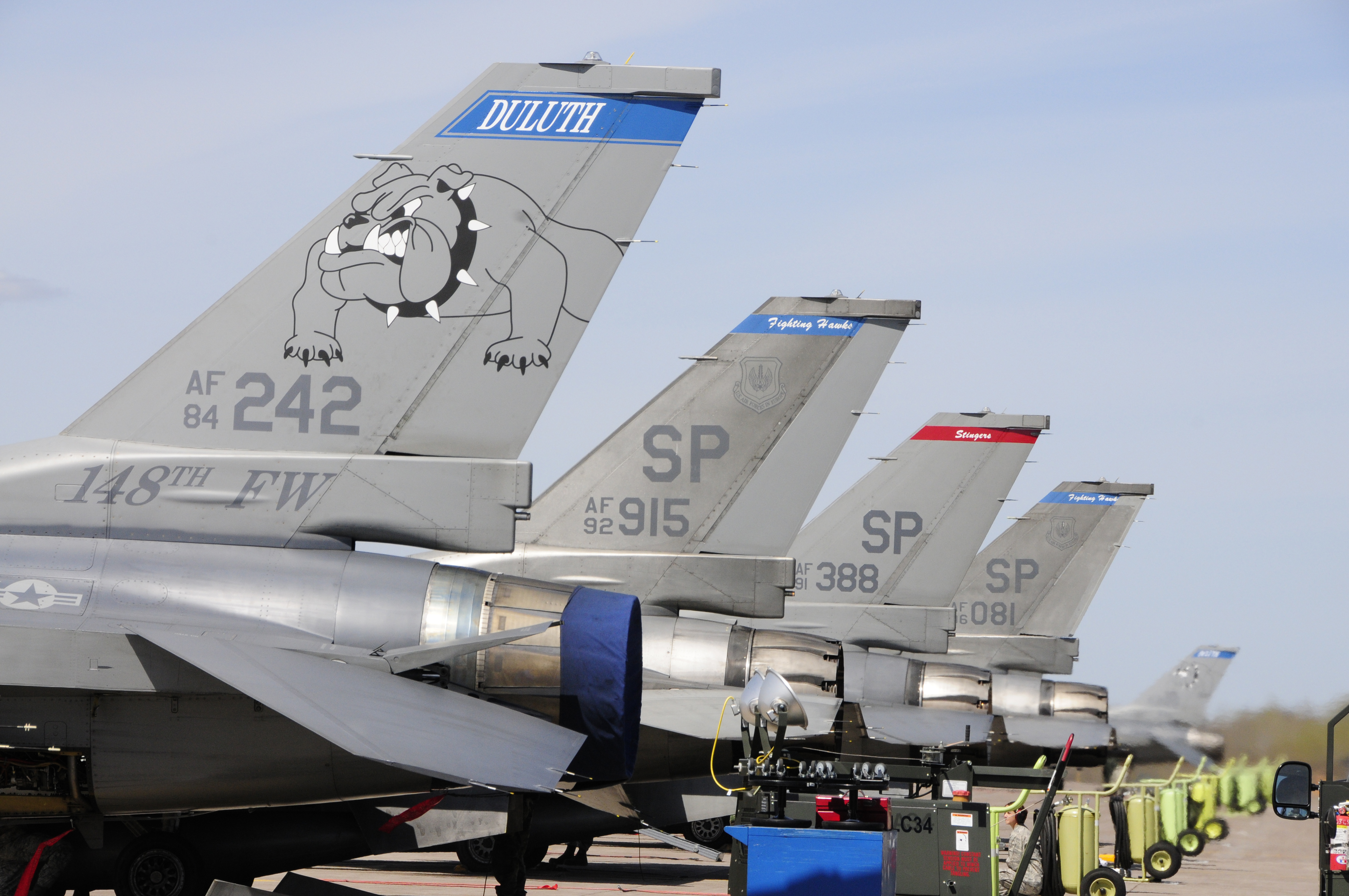
- Three F-16CJ Block 50 Fighting Falcons from Spangdahlem Air Base after arriving to join the 148th Fighter Wing at Duluth ANGB during 2010. In front is an F-16C Block 25C from the 148th FW that was replaced.

Site information
- Type: Air National Guard Base
- Owner: Department of Defense
- Operator: US Air Force (USAF)
- Controlled by: Minnesota Air National Guard
- Condition: Operational
- Website: www.148fw.ang.af.mil/

Location
- Location in the United States
- Coordinates: 46°50′32″N 92°11′37″W

Site history
- Built: 1948
- In use: 1948 – present

Garrison information
- Current commander: Colonel Chris Blomquist
- Garrison: 148th Fighter Wing

Airfield information
- Identifiers: IATA: DLH, ICAO: KDLH, FAA LID: DLH, WMO: 727450
- Elevation: 435.2 metres (1,428 ft) AMSL
Runways
Direction	Length and surface
9/27	3,228.1 metres (10,591 ft) Concrete
3/21	1,743.1 metres (5,719 ft) Asphalt
- Airfield shared with Duluth International Airport; Source: Federal Aviation Administration

Duluth Air National Guard Base is a United States Air National Guard base located on the grounds of Duluth International Airport. It is home to the 148th Fighter Wing.

== History ==
The City of Duluth purchased the original property for the airport in 1929 from St. Louis County. The airport was constructed on 640 acres (2.6 km^{2}) of land with two 2,650-foot (810 m) sod runways. Subsequently, in 1930, the airfield was dedicated as a public airport. The airport was called the Williamson-Johnson Municipal Airport until 1963 at which time it was renamed Duluth International Airport.

=== Air Defense Command ===
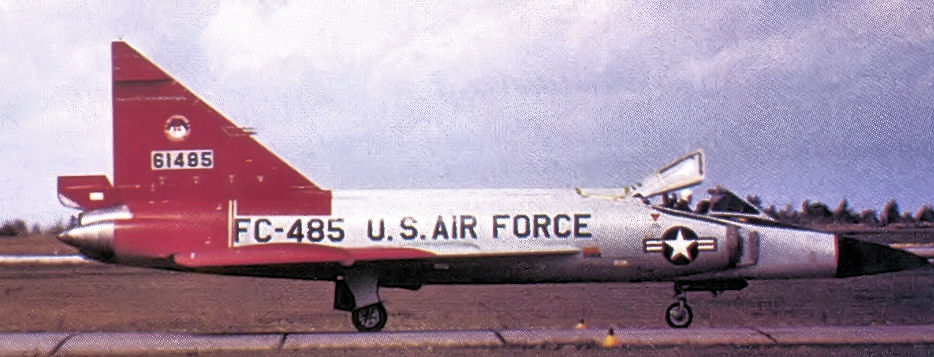
11th FIS F-102 Delta Dagger 56-1485 in arctic colors about 1959

After World War II, the U.S. Air Force constructed permanent and semi-permanent facilities on land leased from the City of Duluth for use by the active Air Force and the Air National Guard. Beginning in 1948, the Minnesota Air National Guard built permanent facilities on the east end of the field. Air Defense Command (ADC) activated the 11th Fighter Interceptor Squadron on 1 December 1952 and the 515th Air Defense Squadron on 16 February 1953 under the Central Air Defense Force 31st Air Division. The 11th flew from Duluth until 1968, flying F-51H Mustangs, F-86D Sabrejets, F-89H/J Scorpions, F-102A Delta Daggers, and lastly F-106A Delta Dart interceptors. In 1968, the squadron was redesignated the 87th Fighter-Interceptor Squadron and continued to operate F-106s until 1979.

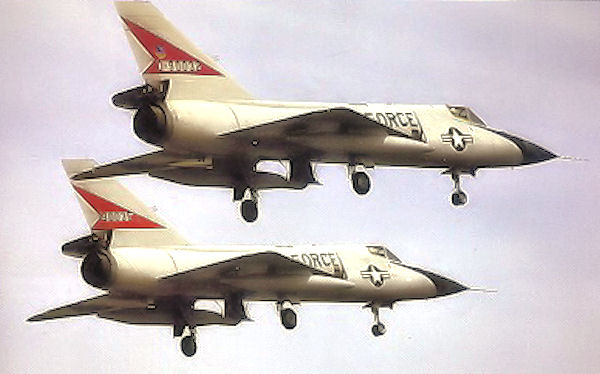
F-106s of the 11th FIS preparing to land, ~1967

In 1966, the Air Defense Command 29th Air Division, operated a Semi Automatic Ground Environment (SAGE) radar command and control center from the airport. SAGE was an automated control system for tracking and intercepting enemy bomber aircraft used by NORAD. In later versions, the system could automatically direct aircraft to an interception by sending commands directly to the aircraft's autopilot. In 1969, the SAGE facility closed and the 23d Air Division replaced it. The 23d AD which was responsible for the air defense of the upper midwest.

=== Minnesota Air National Guard ===
The USAF phased out its Air Defense facilities in 1982, but the Minnesota ANG continues its operations.

Along with its commercial airport usage, the Minnesota Air National Guard's 148th Fighter Wing (148 FW), an Air Combat Command (ACC)-gained unit, is located at the airport. The air national guard base occupies 153.3 acres (620,000 m^{2}) on the northeast corner of the airport. The munitions storage area, which is physically separated from the main base, occupies 16.71 acres (67,600 m^{2}) north of Runway 09/27. The base has a total of 37 buildings; 18 industrial and 19 administrative. Normal ANG population is 320 personnel but surges to 1100 at least once each month during unit training assembly (UTA) drill sessions for the entire wing. The 148th previously flew the F-16A ADF and currently flies the F-16C Fighting Falcon.

=== Known ADCOM units assigned ===
- 23d ADCOM Region, 8 December 1978

Transferred to ADTAC as 23d NORAD Region, 1 October 1979-31 December 1983

- Duluth Air Defense Sector, 8 October 1957

Re-designated: 29th Air Division, 1 April 1966
Re-designated: 23d Air Division, 19 November 1969-15 April 1982

- 514th Air Defense Group, 16 February 1953

Re-designated: 343d Fighter Group, 18 August 1955-1 January 1959

11th Fighter-Interceptor Squadron (FIS), 1 December 1952-30 June 1968

- 4787th Air Base Squadron, 1 December 1952

Re-designated: 4787th Air Base Group, 28 August 1970-31 December 1983

- 4645th Air Defense Squadron (SAGE), 1 July 1972

Re-designated: 23d Air Defense Squadron (ADS)/(SAGE), 1 January 1975-31 December 1983

- 179th Fighter-Interceptor Squadron (Federalized Minnesota Air National Guard) (ANG), 2 March 1951 – 1 December 1952 (F-51D)
- 74th Air Defense Missile Squadron (BOMARC), 1 April 1960 – 30 April 1972

== Based units ==
Flying and notable non-flying units based at Duluth Air National Guard Base.

=== United States Air Force ===
Air National Guard

- Minnesota Air National Guard
  - 148th Fighter Wing
    - Headquarters 148th Fighter Wing
    - 148th Operations Group
      - 179th Fighter Squadron – F-16C Fighting Falcon
      - 148th Operations Support Flight
    - 148th Maintenance Group
      - 148th Aircraft Maintenance Squadron
      - 148th Maintenance Operations Flight
      - 148th Maintenance Squadron
    - 148th Medical Group
    - 148th Mission Support Group
      - 148th Civil Engineering Squadron
      - 148th Communications Squadron
      - 148th Logistics Readiness Squadron
      - 148th Security Forces Squadron

== See also ==
- List of USAF Aerospace Defense Command General Surveillance Radar Stations
- List of United States Air Force aircraft control and warning squadrons
