= List of United States Air Force radar squadrons =

A list of the United States Air Force radar squadrons.

| Squadron | Location | Nickname | Notes: |
|---|---|---|---|
| 666th Radar Squadron | Mill Valley AFS | | SAGE |
| 682d Radar Squadron | Almaden AFS | | SAGE |
| 689th Radar Squadron | Mount Hebo AFS | | SAGE |
| 694th Radar Squadron | Lewistown AFS | | SAGE |
| 750th Radar Squadron | Boron AFS | | SAGE |
| 751st Radar Squadron | Mt. Laguna AFS | | SAGE |
| 776th Radar Squadron | Point Arena AFS | | SAGE |

== See also ==
- List of United States Air Force squadrons
