= Mount Lemmon Air Force Station =

Closed US Air Force surveillance radar station

Mount Lemmon Air Force Station
- Part of Air Defense Command (ADC)

Site information
- Type: Air Force Station
- Controlled by: United States Air Force

Location
- Location of Mount Lemmon AFS, Arizona
- Coordinates: 32°26′30″N 110°47′22″W

Site history
- Built: 1956
- In use: 1956-1969

Garrison information
- Garrison: 684th Aircraft Control and Warning Squadron

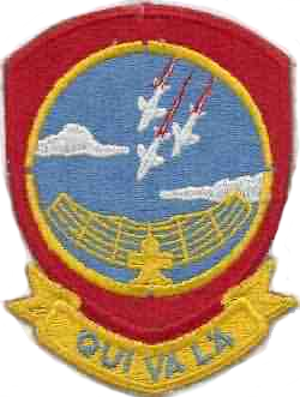
Emblem of the 684th Radar Squadron

Mount Lemmon Air Force Station (ADC ID: M-92, NORAD ID: Z-92) is a closed United States Air Force General Surveillance Radar station. It is located 17.2 miles (27.7 km) north-northeast of Tucson, Arizona. It was closed in 1969.

== History ==
Mount Lemmon Air Force Station was established in 1954 by Air Defense Command as one of a planned deployment of forty-four mobile radar stations to support the permanent ADC Radar network in the United States sited around the perimeter of the country. This deployment was projected to be operational by mid-1952. Funding, constant site changes, construction, and equipment delivery delayed deployment.

This site became operational on 1 April 1956 when the 684th Aircraft Control and Warning Squadron was assigned by the 34th Air Division to Mount Lemmon AFS. The squadron began operations using AN/MPS-7, AN/MPS-14, and AN/TPS-10D radars at Mount Lemmon in August 1956, and initially the station functioned as an aircraft control and warning station. The AN/TPS-10D was soon retired. By 1959 an AN/FPS-20 had replaced the AN/MPS-7 search radar.

The Ground Air Transmitting Receiving (GATR) Site (R-92) for communications was located at 32°26′23″N 110°47′11″W, Normally the GATR site was connected by a pair of buried telephone cables, with a backup connection of dual telephone cables overhead. The Coordinate Data Transmitting Set (CDTS) (AN/FST-2) at the main site converted each radar return into a digital word which was transmitted by the GATR via microwave to the Control Center.

During 1961 Mount Lemmon AFS joined the Semi Automatic Ground Environment (SAGE) system, feeding data to DC-21 at Luke AFB, Arizona. After joining, the squadron was re-designated as the 684th Radar Squadron (SAGE) on 15 October 1961. The radar squadron provided information 24/7 the SAGE Direction Center where it was analyzed to determine range, direction altitude speed and whether or not aircraft were friendly or hostile. During the following year, an AN/FPS-6 supplemented the AN/MPS-14 height-finder radar, and the AN/FPS-20 was upgraded to become an AN/FPS-67. On 31 July 1963, the site was redesignated as NORAD ID Z-92. The AN/FPS-6 was removed in 1968.

In addition to the main facility, Mount Lemmon operated several AN/FPS-14 Gap Filler sites:

- Sells, AZ (M-92A): 32°06′44″N 112°04′29″W
- Benson, AZ (M-92C): 31°59′00″N 110°12′03″W
- Globe, AZ (M-92D): 33°39′36″N 110°33′40″W

The 684th was inactivated in December 1969. However, the GATR facility (R-92) was later reactivated, and is still in use as site G-29 by the 355th Communications Squadron, Davis-Monthan AFB, Arizona. After its closure, Mount Lemmon AFS was used by the University of Arizona and others as an observatory. Its tracking radar (now removed) was used by US Army from Fort Huachuca.

== Air Force units and assignments ==
=== Units ===
- 684th Aircraft Control and Radar Squadron (Assigned on 1 April 1956)

Activated at Geiger Field, Washington on 1 December 1953
Moved to Kirtland AFB, New Mexico on 1 January 1954
Moved to Davis Monthan AFB, Arizona on 1 April 1954
Redesignated 684th Radar Squadron (SAGE), 15 October 1961
Inactivated on 31 December 1969

=== Assignments ===
- 34th Air Division, 1 April 1956
- Los Angeles Air Defense Sector, 1 January 1960
- Phoenix Air Defense Sector, 1 May 1961
- 27th Air Division, 1 April 1966 – 31 December 1969

== See also ==
- List of USAF Aerospace Defense Command General Surveillance Radar Stations
