= Winslow Air Force Station =

Closed United States Air Force General Surveillance Radar station

Winslow Air Force Station
- Part of Air Defense Command (ADC)
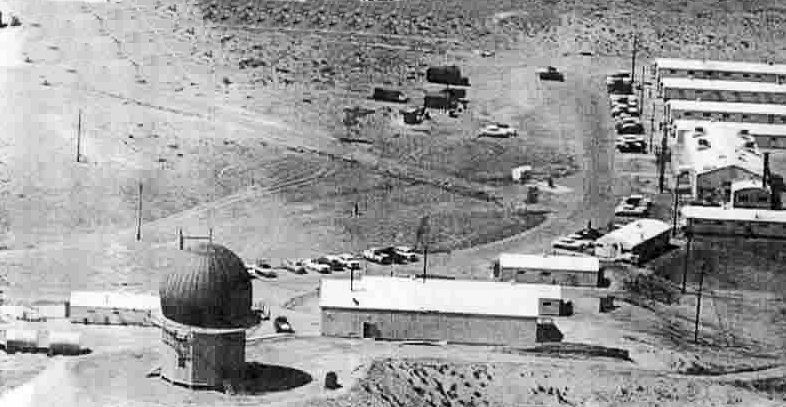
- 1956 USAF photo

Site information
- Type: Air Force Station
- Controlled by: United States Air Force

Location
- Location of Winslow AFS, Arizona
- Coordinates: 35°04′49″N 110°50′01″W

Site history
- Built: 1955
- In use: 1955-1963

Garrison information
- Garrison: 904th Aircraft Control and Warning Squadron

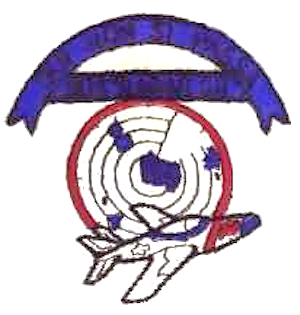
Emblem of the 904th Radar Squadron

Winslow Air Force Station (ADC ID: M-93) is a closed United States Air Force General Surveillance Radar station. It is located in Coconino County, Arizona, 8.7 miles (14.0 km) west-northwest of Winslow, Arizona. It was closed in 1963.

== History ==
Winslow Air Force Station was established in 1954 by Air Defense Command as one of a planned deployment of forty-four Mobile radar stations to support the permanent ADC Radar network in the United States sited around the perimeter of the country. This deployment was projected to be operational by mid-1952, but it was delayed due to funding, constant site changes, construction, and equipment delivery.

This site became operational in April 1955 when the 904th Aircraft Control and Warning Squadron was assigned to the station. Winslow became operational in 1956 with the squadron using an AN/FPS-8 search radar, and initially the station functioned as a Ground-Control Intercept (GCI) and warning station. As a GCI station, the squadron's role was to guide interceptor aircraft toward unidentified intruders picked up on the unit's radar scopes. In 1958 an AN/FPS-6A height-finder radar was added.

During 1961 Winslow AFS joined the Semi Automatic Ground Environment (SAGE) system, feeding data to DC-21 at Luke AFB, Arizona. After joining, the squadron was redesignated as the 904th Radar Squadron (SAGE) on 15 October 1961. The radar squadron provided information 24/7 the SAGE Direction Center where it was analyzed to determine range, direction altitude speed and whether or not aircraft were friendly or hostile. Also in 1961, an AN/FPS-6B was added. An AN/FPS-64 was installed reportedly in 1963, but never became operational. During the AN/FPS-64 installation in a new tower, the AN/FPS-8 was replaced by an AN/MPS-11 on a temperate tower.

In addition to the main facility, Winslow operated several AN/FPS-14 Gap Filler sites:

- Mingus Mountain, AZ (M-93A): 34°42′07″N 112°07′08″W
- Hillside, AZ (M-93B): 34°25′45″N 112°57′46″W

In March 1963 the Air Force ordered Winslow closed; operations ceased 31 May 1963, the station being closed on 1 August. The Air Force transferred the property to the Department of the Interior, Bureau of Indian Affairs (BIA), by Letter of Transfer dated 9 December 1964, effective 11 December 1964.

Beginning in 1966, the former Winslow Air Force Station was home to a training center for the US Job Corps under the control of the Navajo Nation, and housed several hundred teachers, support personnel, and family members, and approximately one hundred inner-city at risk youth. Under the program, inner-city youth were brought to this remote site and trained in heavy-equipment job skills and also earned their GED high school equivalency degrees. The site was closed in 1969 under orders from then-President Nixon. The Navajo Tribe then used the station as a work center for the maintenance of schools within commuting distance until about 1978.

After the site's closure in 1978, the site was thoroughly vandalized. Between 1990 and 1992 all structures associated with the former Winslow Air Force Station Site were removed by the BIA. Approximately 1.2 million dollars were spent on building demolition and removal, and cleanup of environmental hazards. Asbestos containing building materials were removed and disposed of prior to building demolition. In addition, two 15,000 gallon underground storage tanks were removed for disposal, two transformers were disposed of as PCB-contaminated, and sulfuric acid which was stored on the site was removed for disposal, and the site was restored it to its natural state.

Except for some roads, the entire site has been obliterated; today no remains of the station or radars are left.

== Air Force units and assignments ==
=== Units ===
- Established as the 904th Aircraft Control and Warning Squadron

Activated at Kirtland AFB, New Mexico on 18 June 1953
Moved to Winslow AFS on 14 June 1955
Redesignated 904th Radar Squadron (SAGE) on 15 October 1961
Discontinued and inactivated on 1 August 1963

Assignments:

- 34th Air Division, 1 April 1955
- Los Angeles Air Defense Sector, 1 January 1960
- Phoenix Air Defense Sector, 1 May 1961 - 1 August 1963

== See also ==
- List of USAF Aerospace Defense Command General Surveillance Radar Stations
