= 542nd Aircraft Control and Warning Group =

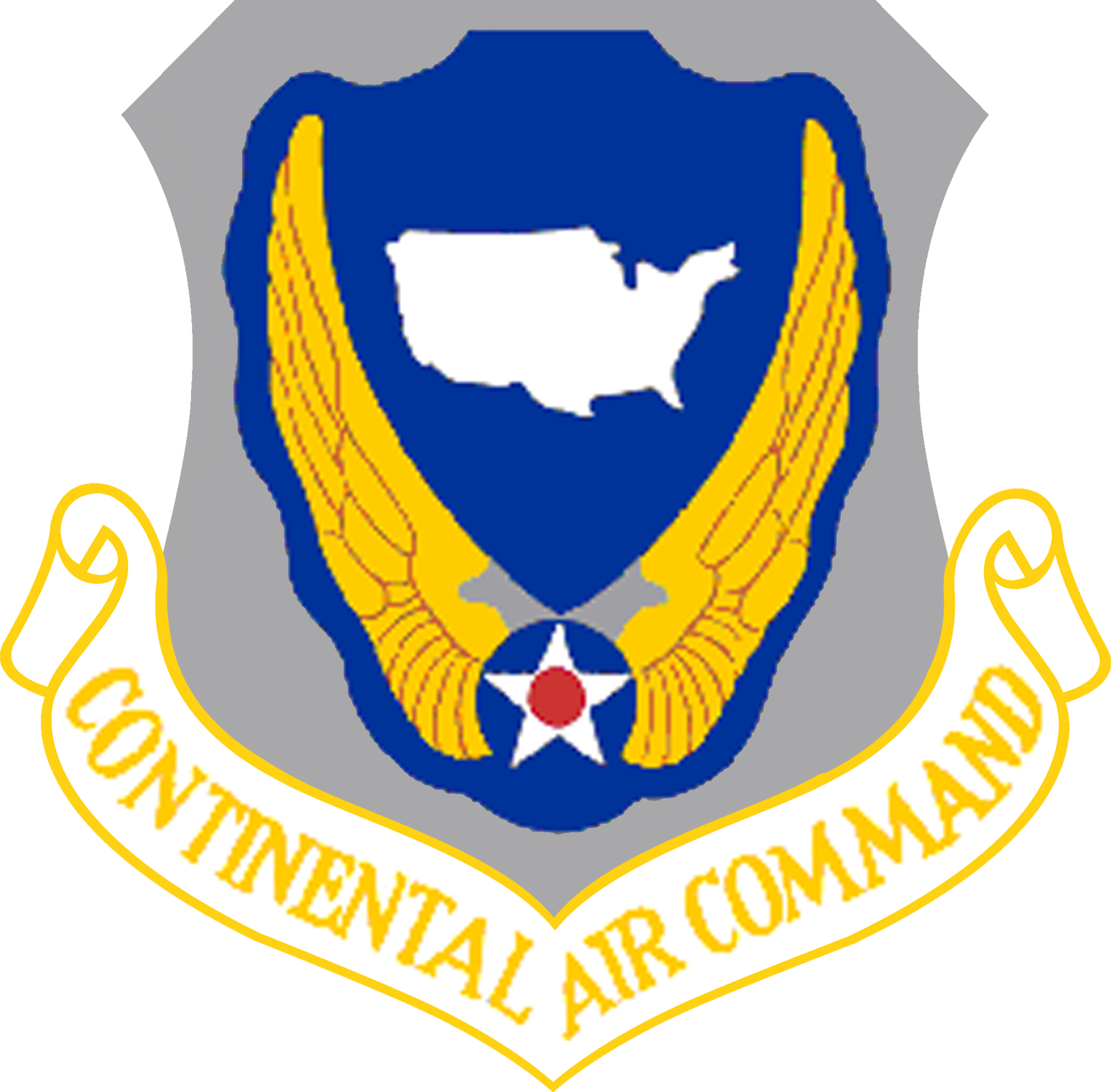
542d Aircraft Control and Warning Group
- Active: 1949–1952
- Country: United States
- Branch: United States Air Force
- Type: Command and Control
- Part of: Air Defense Command

The 542d Aircraft Control and Warning Group is an inactive United States Air Force unit. It was last assigned to the 28th Air Division, stationed at Hamilton Air Force Base, California. It was inactivated on 6 February 1952.

This command and control organization was responsible for Aircraft Control and Warning (Radar) stations along the West Coast. On 27 April 1950, the reserve 566th AC&WG was activated as a Corollary unit at Hamilton, sharing the 542d's equipment and facilities. The 566th was called to active duty on 10 May 1951 and was inactivated, with its personnel used as fillers for the 542d. It was dissolved after about three years, with the units being assigned directly to its parent Air Division.

== Lineage ==
- Established as 542d Aircraft Control and Warning Group

Activated on 8 December 1949
Inactivated on 6 February 1952
Disbanded on 21 September 1984

Assignments

- 28th Air Division, 8 December 1949 – 6 February 1952

Stations

- Hamilton AFB, California, 8 December 1949 – 6 February 1952

Components

- 666th Aircraft Control and Warning Squadron

Mount Tamalpais, California, 27 November 1950 – 6 February 1952

- 667th Aircraft Control and Warning Squadron

Hamilton AFB, California, 8 December 1949 – 6 February 1952

- 668th Aircraft Control and Warning Squadron

Mather AFB, California, 8 December 1949 – 6 February 1952

- 669th Aircraft Control and Warning Squadron

Fort MacArthur, California, 5 May 1950 – 27 November 1950

- 670th Aircraft Control and Warning Squadron

Camp Cooke, California, 5 May 1950 – 27 November 1950

- 774th Aircraft Control and Warning Squadron

Madera AFS, California, 27 November 1950 – 6 February 1952

- 775th Aircraft Control and Warning Squadron

Cambria AFS, California, 7 March 1951 – 6 February 1952

- 776th Aircraft Control and Warning Squadron

Point Arena AFS, California, 27 November 1950 – 6 February 1952

- 777th Aircraft Control and Warning Squadron

Klamath AFS, California, 18 December 1950 – 6 February 1952

== See also ==
- List of United States Air Force aircraft control and warning squadrons
