= Cambria Air Force Station =

Closed United States Air Force General Surveillance Radar station

Cambria Air Force Station
- Part of Air Defense Command (ADC)

Site information
- Type: Air Force Station
- Code: ADC ID: P-2, NORAD ID: Z-2
- Controlled by: United States Air Force

Location
- Location of Cambria AFS, California
- Coordinates: 35°31′20″N 121°03′49″W

Site history
- Built: 1951
- In use: 1951–1980

Garrison information
- Garrison: 775th Aircraft Control and Warning Squadron

Cambria Air Force Station is a closed United States Air Force General Surveillance Radar station. It is 3 miles (4.8 km) south-southeast of Cambria, California. It was closed in 1980.

== History ==
Cambria Air Force Station was one of twenty-eight stations built as part of the second segment of the Air Defense Command permanent radar network. Prompted by the start of the Korean War, on 11 July 1950, the Secretary of the Air Force asked the Secretary of Defense for approval to expedite construction of the permanent network. Receiving the Defense Secretary's approval on 21 July, the Air Force directed the Corps of Engineers to proceed with construction.

The 775th Aircraft Control and Warning Squadron was initially assigned to a temporary "Lashup" site (LP-2) that was established in November 1951 at Cambria equipped with an AN/TPS-1C radar. On 1 December 1953 the permanent station was activated with AN/FPS-3 search and AN/CPS-4 height-finder radars, replacing the earlier site, and initially the station functioned as a Ground-Control Intercept (GCI) and warning station. As a GCI station, the squadron's role was to guide interceptor aircraft toward unidentified intruders picked up on the unit's radar scopes.

In 1955 the height-finder radar was replaced by an AN/FPS-6. An AN/FPS-8 search radar also operated for a short time from 1955 to 1956. In 1959 the site featured two AN/FPS-3, and AN/FPS-6 and AN/FPS-6A radars. In 1961 the site received an AN/FPS-7 radar featuring ECCM capability. In 1961 the site also replaced the AN/FPS-6A height-finder radar with an AN/FPS-6B model. In April 1961 Cambria AFS joined the Semi Automatic Ground Environment (SAGE) system, feeding data to DC-17 at Norton AFB, California. After joining, the squadron was redesignated as the 775th Radar Squadron (SAGE) on 1 May 1961. The radar squadron provided information 24/7 the SAGE Direction Center where it was analyzed to determine range, direction altitude speed and whether or not aircraft were friendly or hostile.

In 1963 an AN/FPS-26A replaced the AN/FPS-6B height-finder radar, and continued routine radar surveillance throughout the 1960s and 1970s. Cambria AFS was re-designated as NORAD ID Z-2 on 31 July 1963.

In addition to the main facility, Cambria operated the AN/FPS-14 Gap Filler site:

- Lockwood, CA (P-2A) 35°57′04″N 121°00′05″W

Over the years, the equipment at the station was upgraded or modified to improve the efficiency and accuracy of the information gathered by the radars. In 1979 Cambria came under Tactical Air Command (TAC) jurisdiction with the inactivation of Aerospace Defense Command and the creation of ADTAC. Operations ceased on 30 September 1980 as a result of budget restrictions, and the general phase down of air defense radar stations.

It was operated by the Coast Guard as a NAVTEX (Navigational Telex, broadcasting safety notices & weather info to ships) station.

Today, what was Cambria Air Force Station is in private hands. The station sold to Big Cats LLC, Bernd Schaefers on 13 January 2005 for $2,000,000. Most buildings are in reasonable condition with most of the towers still remaining. After completion of code upgrades and de-militarization, the Uniphi Foundation, a subsidiary of Our Kids Future Foundation (a not-for-profit California corporation), is planning to use it as a Uniphi Foundation Learning Center.

See http://www.sanluisobispo.com/news/local/article39154191.html & http://www.sanluisobispo.com/news/local/article39119154.html for information on asbestos on the site.

== Air Force units and assignments ==
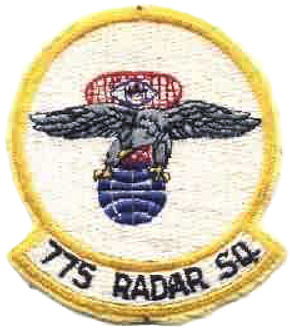
Emblem of the 775th Radar Squadron

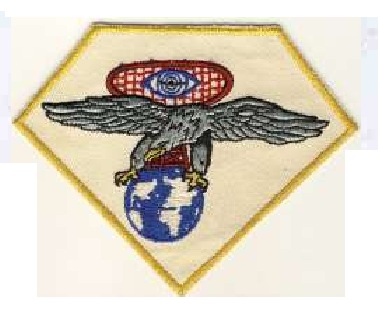
775th Aircraft Control & Warning Squadron emblem

Units
775th Radar Squadron

- Constituted as the 775th Aircraft Control and Warning Squadron

Activated at Cambria, California on 7 March 1951
Site renamed Cambria Air Force Station on 1 December 1953
Redesignated as 775th Radar Squadron (SAGE) on 1 May 1961
Redesignated as 775th Radar Squadron on 1 February 1974
Inactivated on 30 September 1980

Assignments:

- 542d Aircraft Control and Warning Group, 7 March 1951
- 28th Air Division, 6 February 1952
- 27th Air Division, 1 October 1954
- Los Angeles Air Defense Sector, 1 October 1959
- 27th Air Division, 1 April 1966
- 26th Air Division, 19 November 1969 – 30 September 1980

== See also ==
- List of United States Air Force aircraft control and warning squadrons
- United States general surveillance radar stations
