= Ajo Air Force Station =

Closed USAF surveillance radar site

Ajo Air Force Station Luke-Williams Range
- Part of Air Defense Command (ADC)

Site information
- Type: Air Force Station
- Code: ADC ID: TM-181, NORAD ID: Z-181
- Controlled by: United States Air Force

Location
- Location of Ajo AFS, Arizona
- Coordinates: 32°25′52″N 112°56′42″W

Site history
- Built: 1958
- In use: 1958–1969

Garrison information
- Garrison: 612th Aircraft Control and Warning Squadron

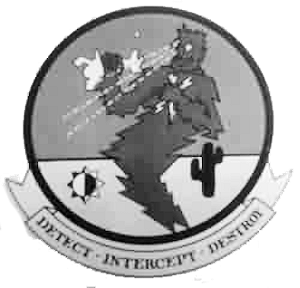
Emblem of the 612th Radar Squadron. Emblem was designed by Staff Sergeant Larry Jackson in 1958.

Ajo Air Force Station is a closed United States Air Force General Surveillance Radar station. It is located 6.4 miles (10.3 km) northwest of Ajo, Arizona. It was closed in 1969 by the Air Force, and the radar site turned over to the Federal Aviation Administration (FAA).

Today the site is part of the Joint Surveillance System (JSS), designated by NORAD as Western Air Defense Sector (WADS) Ground Equipment Facility J-29A.

== History ==
Ajo Air Force Station came into existence as part of Phase III of the Air Defense Command Mobile Radar program. On 20 October 1953 ADC requested a third phase of twenty-five radar sites be constructed.

Ajo was one of the most expensive ADC radar stations to be constructed, with costs mounting to approximately $7.4 million for 100 structures located within housing, cantonment, operations, ground-air transmitter-receiver (GATR) areas. This site became active in January 1958 with the 612th Aircraft Control and Warning Squadron being assigned to the new station under 34th Air Division. Initially, 612th AC&W Squadron operated AN/FPS-20A and AN/FPS-6 radars, and initially the station functioned as a Ground-Control Intercept (GCI) and warning station. As a GCI station, the squadron's role was to guide interceptor aircraft toward unidentified intruders picked up on the unit's radar scopes.

The Ground Air Transmitting Receiving (GATR) Site for communications was located at 32°26′31″N 112°56′56″W, approximately 0.8 miles north-northwest from the main site. Normally the GATR site was connected by a pair of buried telephone cables, with a backup connection of dual telephone cables overhead. The Coordinate Data Transmitting Set (CDTS) (AN/FST-2) at the main site converted each radar return into a digital word which was transmitted by the GATR via microwave to the Control Center.

During 1961 Ajo AFS joined the Semi Automatic Ground Environment (SAGE) system, feeding data to DC-21 at Luke AFB, Arizona. After joining, the squadron was re-designated as the 612th Radar Squadron (SAGE) on 15 October 1961. The radar squadron provided information 24/7 the SAGE Direction Center where it was analyzed to determine range, direction altitude speed and whether or not aircraft were friendly or hostile. On 31 July 1963, the site was redesignated as NORAD ID Z-181.

By 1963 an AN/FPS-7C had assumed search duties, and height-finder radar chores were being performed by AN/FPS-6A and AN/FPS-26 radars. On 31 July 1963, the site was redesignated as NORAD ID Z-181.

In addition to the main facility, Ajo operated an AN/FPS-14 Gap Filler site:

- Covered Wells, AZ (TM-181B): 32°10′53″N 112°20′05″W

The 612th Radar Squadron was inactivated on 31 December 1969. Housing units were moved to Gila Bend, and the remaining buildings were abandoned.

After the site's closure, the buildings and other structures of the former Ajo AFS sat abandoned and deteriorated for decades. Today, all buildings and structures of the original Air Force Station, except for the AN/FPS-26 height-finder radar tower, have been removed. The National Park Service demolished the station site in 1994 and restored it to its natural state, including removal of thee concrete building pads.

A minimal Air Force and FAA presence was kept to operate some instrumentation and radio-signal relay equipment. The radar site has since re-opened as a Joint Surveillance System (JSS) FAA facility (J-29A) replacing the JSS site at Humboldt Mountain (Phoenix), AZ. It operates an ARSR-4 radar and a communications site for the Barry M. Goldwater USAF Range (formerly known as Luke-Williams Range). The former Air Force radar site also hosts an Air Combat Maneuvering Instrumentation (ACMI) antenna on top of old AN/FPS-26 radar tower.

== Air Force units and assignments ==
Units:

- 612th Aircraft Control and Warning Squadron, activated at Kirtland AFB, New Mexico on 8 March 1957

Moved to Ajo AFS on 1 January 1958
Redesignated 612th Radar Squadron (SAGE) on 15 October 1961
Inactivated on 31 December 1969

Assignments:

- 34th Air Division, 1 January 1958
- Los Angeles Air Defense Sector, 1 January 1960
- Phoenix Air Defense Sector, May 1961
- 27th Air Division, 1 April 1966 – 31 December 1969

== See also ==
- List of USAF Aerospace Defense Command General Surveillance Radar Stations
