= 27th Air Division =

US Air Force unit

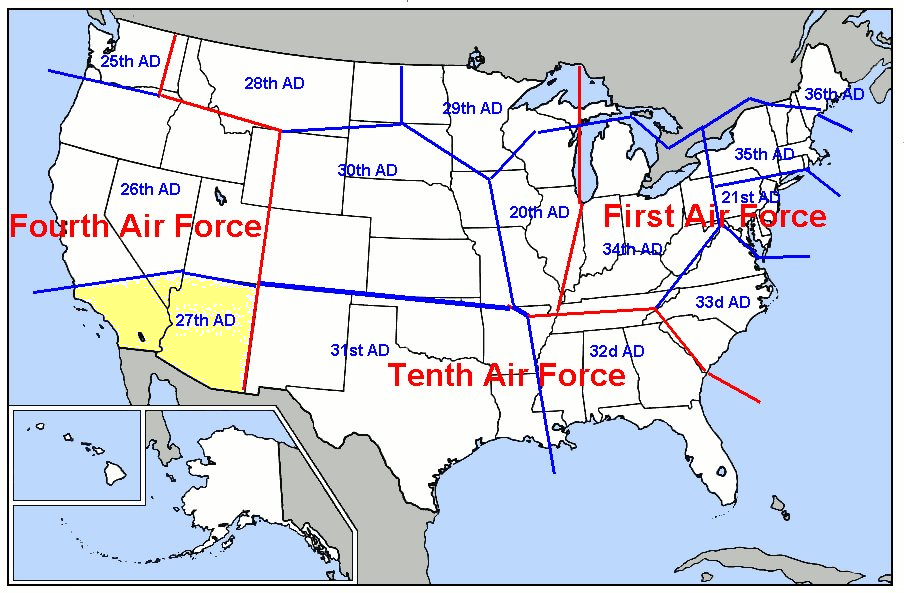
- The area of the Los Angeles Air Defense Sector (1960–6) and 27th Air Division (1966–69) was adjacent to the 26th, 30th, and 31st Air Divisions at the Four Corners
- Active: 1950–1959, 1966–1969
- Country: United States
- Branch: United States Air Force
- Role: Command of air defense forces
- Part of: Air Defense Command

Insignia
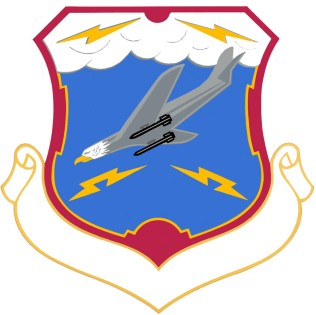
- 27th Air Division emblem (Approved 23 July 1953)

The 27th Air Division was a United States Air Force numbered air division and the geographic Air Defense Command region controlled by the 27th AD. Its last assignment was with Air Defense Command (ADC)'s Tenth Air Force, at Luke Air Force Base, Arizona. It was inactivated on 19 November 1969.

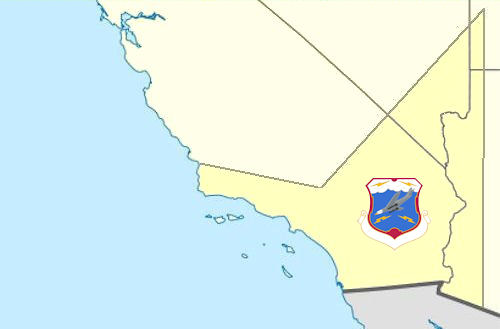
Area of the 27th Air Division (1950–9) and subsequent 1959 Los Angeles Air Defense Sector

== Norton AFB ==
Activated as the 27 Air Division (Defense) on 7 September 1950, the unit was assigned to ADC for most of its existence, (Note: until 1 December 1950, its parent Western Air Defense Force was part of Continental Air Command) the division's initial air defense area was southern California and later southern Nevada (and a small portion of Arizona by 1953).

The 4705th Defense Wing was a temporary unit that absorbed the 1st Fighter-Interceptor Wing's personnel and equipment five days after it was organized in early 1952 at Norton Air Force Base. These units included, for example, the 94th Fighter-Interceptor Squadron at George Air Force Base). The wing was discontinued and the 94th FIS reassigned directly to 27th Air Division, which had reorganized at Norton in February, one month later.

In May 1958, the 27th AD directed a hostile intercept of a "declared unknown" aircraft (without proper IFF), but the "interceptor pilot remembered...that opening bomb bay doors was to be considered a hostile act only after declaration of an Air Defense Emergency or Warning Yellow or Red" (the SAC B-47 was on a Radar Bomb Scoring bomb run near the Los Angeles Bomb Plot.) The 27th AD was designated 1 of 23 NORAD divisions effective 10 June 1958 by NORAD General Order 6.

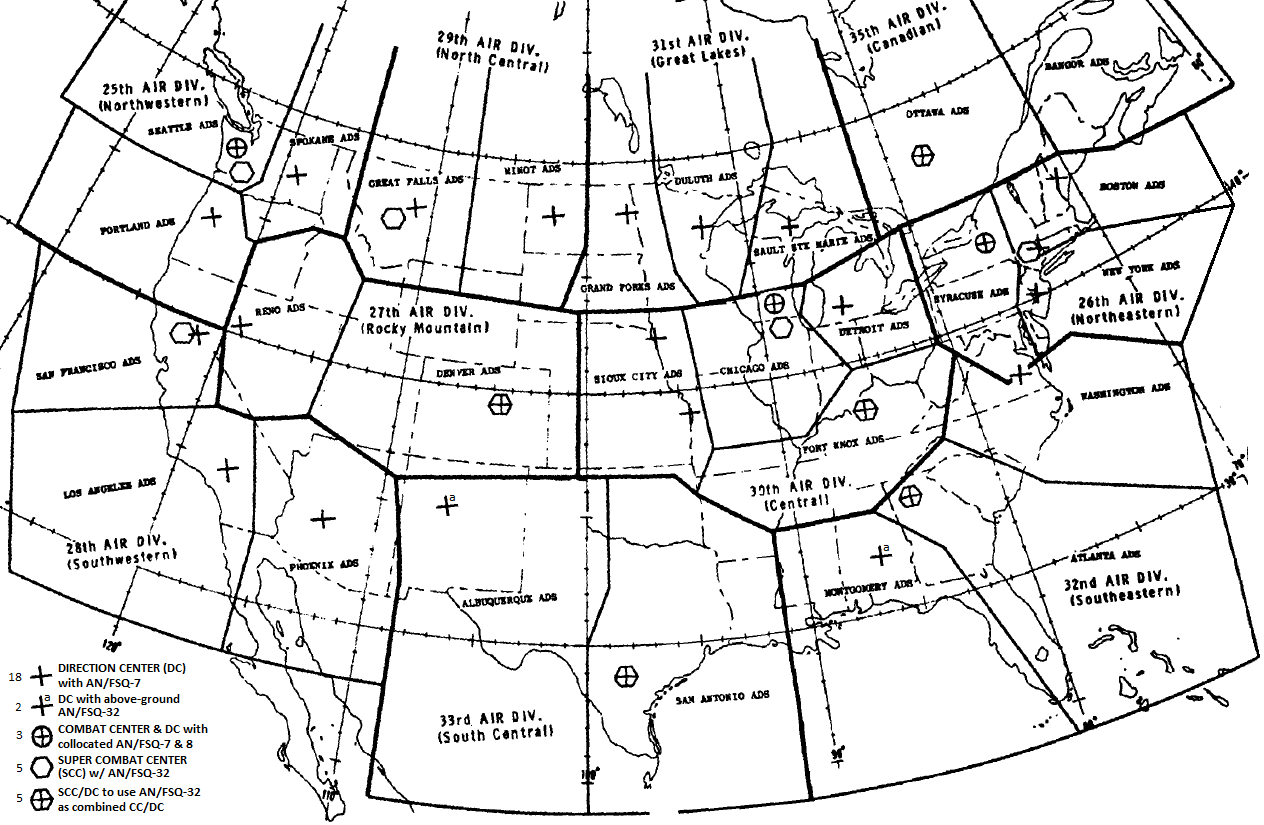
Planned 27th Air Division (Rocky Mountain) with Super Combat Center at Denver

== Rocky Mountain Division ==
The "27th Air Division (Rocky Mountain)" was to transfer to the midwest with command of 2 NORAD sectors (Reno and Denver Air Defense Sectors) during deployment of SAGE. In addition to a hardened Air Defense Direction Center at Stead Air Force Base for the Reno sector; NORAD's 25 July 1958 SAGE Geographic Reorganization Plan identified the Super Combat Center/Direction Center (SCC/DC) nuclear bunker for the division was to be at Denver, Colorado (cf. the bunkers later planned for the Cheyenne Mountain Complex and in a Cripple Creek mine). The division's general area was west-to-east from the western Nevada state meridian (near the Sierra Escarpment) to the Great Plains near Oakley, Kansas; and north–south from mid-Wyoming to just south of the Four Corners latitude. Existing Permanent System radar stations in the planned Rocky Mountain Division included the Fallon, Tonopah, and Winnemucca Air Force Stations (the atomic-powered "SAGE feeder station" in the Black Hills NF became operational in 1962); and facilities and cities to be protected by the division included the Salt Lake City military installations west of the Rockies and planned Titan missile launch complexes and an Air Force Plant at the Colorado Front Range. The Reno sector was activated 15 February 1959 and the AN/FSQ-7 at Stead Air Force Base was replaced by Backup Interceptor Control (BUIC) at Fallon Naval Air Station by 1970.

In February 1959, the Los Angeles Air Defense Sector was activated during the deployment of the Semi Automatic Ground Environment#Deployment (SAGE) as a subordinate unit of the 27th AD. However, the Denver SCC/CC was cancelled in March 1959; so instead of moving from the Southwest United States to the interior (and the 28th Air Division then taking over as the Southwestern Air Division), the 27th Air Division was inactivated on 1 October 1959 (command transferred to the subordinate Los Angeles Air Defense Sector).

== Luke AFB ==
Reactivated in January 1966 at Luke Air Force Base, the 27th Air Division consolidation the Los Angeles and Phoenix Air Defense Sectors, and the division assumed the additional designation of 27th NORAD Region after activation of the NORAD Combat Operations Center at the Cheyenne Mountain Complex, Colorado. The Norton SAGE Direction Center closed in June 1966 (the Luke Direction Center was 1 of 6 still open in 1970). When the 27th AD was inactivated in 1969, its mission, personnel and operations center at Luke were transferred to the 26th Air Division.

== Lineage ==
- Constituted as the 27 Air Division (Defense) in September 1950

Activated on 20 September 1950
Inactivated on 1 February 1952 (Note: The simultaneous inactivation and organization in February 1952 represents only a change in the type of organization of the division between Table of Distribution and Table of Organization and had no practical effect on the unit.)

- Organized on 1 February 1952

Inactivated on 1 October 1959

- Redesignated as the 27th Air Division and activated on 20 January 1966

Organized on 1 April 1966
Inactivated on 19 November 1969

Assignments

- Western Air Defense Force, 20 September 1950 – 1 October 1959
- Air Defense Command, 20 January 1966

Fourth Air Force, 1 April 1966
Tenth Air Force, 15 September 1969 – 19 November 1969

Stations

- Norton Air Force Base, California, 20 September 1950 – 1 October 1959
- Luke Air Force Base, Arizona, 1 April 1966 – 19 November 1969

=== Components ===
Sector

- Los Angeles Air Defense Sector, 15 February 1959 – 1 October 1959

Wings

- 1st Fighter-Interceptor Wing (attached)

March Air Force Base, California 20 September 1950 – 1 February 1952

- 78th Fighter Wing (Air Defense)

Hamilton Air Force Base, California, 15 September 1969 – 19 November 1969

- 4705th Defense Wing

Norton Air Force Base, California, 1 February 1952 – 1 March 1952

Groups

- 414th Fighter Group

Oxnard Air Force Base, California, 18 August 1955 – 1 October 1959; 1 April 1966 – 19 November 1966

- 533d Air Defense Group

Oxnard Air Force Base, California, 16 February 1953 – 18 August 1955

- 544th Aircraft Control and Warning Group

Norton Air Force Base, California, 1 March 1951 – 6 February 1952

- 4722d Defense Group

George Air Force Base, California, 1 December 1956 – 1 July 1958

Defense Systems Evaluation Squadron

- 4758th Defense Systems Evaluation Squadron

Holloman Air Force Base, New Mexico, 15 November 1969 – 19 November 1959

Fighter Squadrons

- 94th Fighter-Interceptor Squadron

George Air Force Base, California, 1 March 1952 – 18 August 1955

- 188th Fighter-Interceptor Squadron

Federalized New Mexico Air National Guard
Long Beach Municipal Airport, California, 1 March 1952 – 1 November 1952

- 327th Fighter-Interceptor Squadron

George Air Force Base, California, 18 August 1955 – 1 December 1956

- 329th Fighter-Interceptor Squadron

George Air Force Base, California, 18 August 1955 – 1 December 1956; 1 September 1958 – 1 October 1959; 1 April 1966 – 31 July 1967

- 354th Fighter-Interceptor Squadron

Oxnard Air Force Base, California, 15 December 1952 – 16 February 1953

- 456th Fighter-Interceptor Squadron (attached)

Castle Air Force Base, California, 18 July 1968

- 518th Fighter-Interceptor Squadron

George Air Force Base, California, 8 January-18 August 1955

Radar squadrons

- 659th Aircraft Control and Warning Squadron

Kingman Air Force Station, AZ, 20 June 1953 – 15 August 1958

- 666th Aircraft Control and Warning Squadron

Mill Valley Air Force Station, California, 15 September 1969 – 19 November 1969

- 669th Aircraft Control and Warning Squadron

Santa Rosa Island Air Force Station, California, 6 February 1952 – 1 October 1959
Lompoc Air Force Station, California, 1 April 1966 – 18 June 1968

- 670th Radar Squadron

San Pedro Hill Air Force Station, California, 6 February 1952 – 1 October 1959; 1 April 1966 – 1 April 1976

- 682d Radar Squadron

Almaden Air Force Station, California, 15 September 1969 – 19 November 1969

- 684th Radar Squadron

Mount Lemmon Air Force Station, Arizona, 1 April 1966 – 31 December 1969

- 750th Radar Squadron

Boron Air Force Station, California, 6 February 1952 – 1 October 1959; 19 November 1969 – 30 June 1975

- 751st Radar Squadron

Mount Laguna Air Force Station, California, 6 February 1952 – 1 October 1959; 1 April 1966 – 19 November 1969

- 775th Radar Squadron

Cambria Air Force Station, California, 1 October 1954 – 1 October 1959; 1 April 1966 – 19 November 1969

- 776th Radar Squadron

Point Arena Air Force Station, California, 15 September-19 November 1969

- 827th Radar Squadron

Keno Air Force Station, Oregon, 15 September-19 November 1969

- 858th Radar Squadron

Fallon Air Force Station, Nevada, 15 September-19 November 1969

- 859th Radar Squadron

Red Bluff Air Force Station, California, 15 September-19 November 1969

- 864th Aircraft Control and Warning Squadron

Vincent Air Force Base, Arizona, 8 August 1955 – 1 October 1959

- 865th Radar Squadron

Las Vegas Air Force Station, Nevada, 1 April 1956 – 1 October 1959; 1 April 1966 – 31 December 1969

- 866th Radar Squadron

Tonopah Air Force Station, Nevada, 15 September-19 November 1969

== See also ==
- United States general surveillance radar stations
- List of United States Air Force aircraft control and warning squadrons
