= 544th Aircraft Control and Warning Group =

544th Aircraft Control and Warning Group
- Active: 1950-1952
- Country: United States
- Branch: United States Air Force
- Type: Command and Control

The 544th Aircraft Control and Warning Group is an inactive United States Air Force unit. It was assigned to the 27th Air Division, and last stationed at Norton Air Force Base, California. It was inactivated on 6 February 1952.

This command and control organization was responsible for the organization, manning and equipping of new Aircraft Control and Warning (Radar) units. It was dissolved with the units being assigned directly to the 27th AD.

== Lineage ==
- Established as the 544th Aircraft Control and Warning Group

Activated on 8 October 1950
Inactivated on 6 February 1952
Disbanded on 21 September 1984

Stations

- probably Hamilton AFB, California 8 October 1950
- Norton AFB, California 27 November 1950 – 6 February 1952

Components

- 669th Aircraft Control and Warning Squadron

Fort MacArthur, California, 27 November 1950 – 6 February 1952

- 670th Aircraft Control and Warning Squadron

Camp Cooke, California, 27 November 1950 – 6 February 1952

- 685th Aircraft Control and Warning Squadron

Norton AFB, California, 27 November 1950 – 6 February 1952

- 750th Aircraft Control and Warning Squadron

Atolia, California, 8 October 1950 – 6 February 1952

- 751st Aircraft Control and Warning Squadron

Mount Laguna AFS, California, 27 November 1950 – 6 February 1952

== See also ==
- List of United States Air Force aircraft control and warning squadrons
