= Denver Air Defense Sector =

- military region
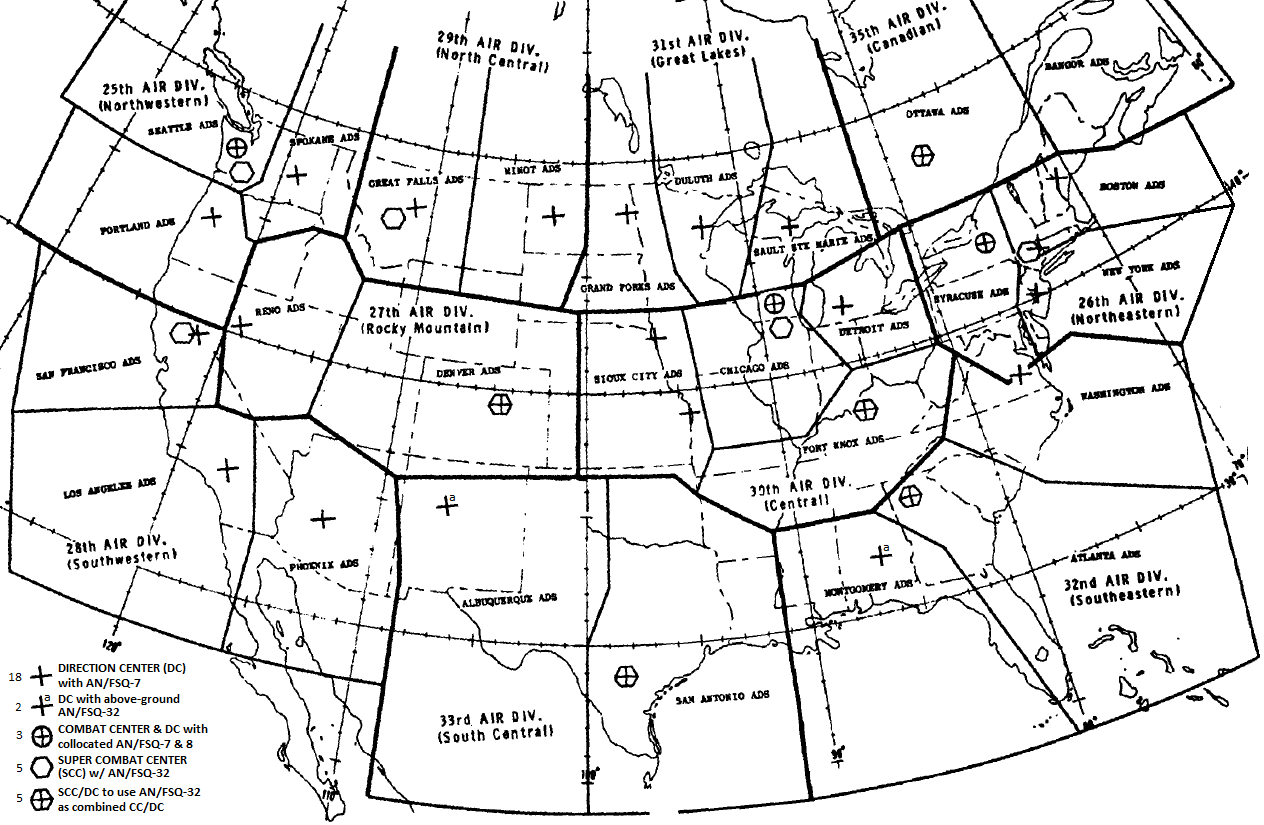
- The 5-sided Denver ADS had corners in Idaho, South Dakota, Oklahoma, Arizona, and Nevada. The Super Combat Center near the 40th parallel north for both sectors of the Rocky Mountain Division was also to be used as a Direction Center (SCC/DC).
- Country: United States
- Military installations: SCC/DC: [never built] ADC airbases: tbd AFB; Radar stations: Lowry AFB, …

The Denver Air Defense Sector was a United States Air Force geographic area designated during the Cold War for both air defense and air traffic control, as well as the name of the planned military unit for conducting radar surveillance and fighter-interceptor operations in the sector area. The Denver ADS spanned the entire state of Colorado, nearly all of Utah, most of Wyoming and western Nebraska, and small parts of Kansas, Oklahoma, New Mexico, Arizona, and Nevada. Potential targets in the sector included the military/industrial facilities and urban civilian populations of the metropolitan areas at Salt Lake City, Cheyenne, Denver, and Colorado Springs. (Omaha and Wichita military/industrial complexes were in the Sioux City sector).

Along with the adjacent Reno Air Defense Sector, the Denver ADS was intended to be in the 27th Air Division ("Rocky Mountain" division) between 1 August – 31 December 1958, under NORAD's 25 July 1958, SAGE Geographic Reorganization Plan for the orderly transition and phasing from the manual to the SAGE Defense System of radar stations, interceptor bases, and a new computer and communications network creating a Semi-Automatic Ground Environment.

After 10 Super Combat Center (SCC) in underground bunkers were designated by the "USAF ADC Plan" approved by NORAD on 20 December 1958, additional Air Defense Command planning designated an SCC was to be constructed for command and control. The Denver SCC/DC was planned to become operational by May 1964.

== Geography ==
The area of the Denver Air Defense Sector was an irregular pentagon from the Great Basin's northeastern corner through the Central Rocky Mountains to the East border (100.65 meridian West) in the Great Plains. Formed primarily from the southern portion of the pre-SAGE 29th Air Division, smaller additional areas of the 25th & 28th Air Divisions were included to the West, the 25th & 34th ADs to the South, and to the East the 31st, 20th, & 33rd ADs. After the USAF had proposed Lowry AFB in 1958 for a new NORAD facility (as it would be temporary USAF Academy facilities were to be vacated), the bunker for both the sector headquarters and the SCC/DC at the Denver Metropolitan Area was published in the January–June 1959 NORAD Historical Summary (declassified by NORAD/J3 in 1998).

== Austere SAGE area ==
In June 1959, in conjunction with SecDef approval for an "Improved SAGE environment" near coasts of the US and the Canada–US border—plus 1 sector in Canada, an "Austere SAGE environment" was also planned. A military region in the "south-central and central area" of the US in 6 sectors defined in the 1 July 1959, SAGE Implementation Schedule:

"Denver Air Defense Sector, Sioux City Air Defense Sector, Albuquerque Air Defense Sector, San Antonio Air Defense Sector, Phoenix Air Defense Sector (east of 112°), and Fort Knox Air Defense Sector (west of 86°30')"

Denver ADS perimeter
Point & state(s)	Adjacent sector(s)	Location
corner:NW ID	Reno/Great Falls	
state line ID/WY	Great Falls	
WY	Great Falls & Minot	
state line WY/SD	Minot	
SD	Minot/Grand Forks	
corner: NE SD	Grand Forks/Sioux City	43.5°N 100.65°W
state line SD/NE	Sioux City	43.0°N 100.65°W
state line NE/KS	Sioux City	40.0°N 100.65°W
state line KS/OK	Sioux City	36.5°N 100.65°W
corner: SE OK*	Sioux City/Albuquerque	
state line OK*/NM	Albuquerque	
state line NM/AZ	Albuquerque	
corner: SSW AZ	Albuquerque/Phoenix	
state line AZ/UT	Phoenix	
state line UT/NV	Phoenix	
corner: W NV	Phoenix/Reno	
state line NV/UT	Reno	
state line UT/ID	Reno	
*The 1959 map does not show a distinct line between the southern Oklahoma panhandle state line and the Denver ADS.

was constituted by NORAD on 7 October 1959, as the new "austere SAGE area" to have limited gap filler coverage and no advanced radars.

Previously planned bunkers for the SCC/DCs at Denver (27th) and San Antonio (33rd) plus an above-ground AN/FSQ-32 at Albuquerque were reconsidered for the austere SAGE area to instead have "three Super Combat Centers in soft configuration". NORAD, USAF, and ADC agreed on a "new radar program" with the austere conditions, and on 9 December 1959, HQ USAF deferred construction of the underground "Denver" bunker for the SCC "because of budget considerations for FY 1961" (other SCCs, including the Ft Knox SCC/DC east of 86°30', were approved despite the hold order on SCC equipment). Plans for the Rocky Mountain Division were discontinued by 15 January 1960, and coordination of interceptors for the general area was instead controlled by the 29th and 34th Air Divisions.

The Denver SCC/DC was entirely cancelled with all Super Combat Centers on 18 March 1960, after an Office of the Secretary of Defense (OSD) evaluation and c. 1961, the military region with the NORAD headquarters at Ent Air Force Base in Colorado Springs was the only CONUS area not an Air Defense Sector.
