= Las Vegas Air Force Station =

Closed United States Air Force General Surveillance Radar station

Las Vegas Air Force Station
- Part of Air Defense Command (ADC)
- Las Vegas, NV

Site information
- Type: Air Force Station
- Controlled by: United States Air Force

Location
- Location of Las Vegas AFS, Nevada
- Coordinates: 36°19′07″N 115°34′31″W

Site history
- Built: 1952
- In use: 1956-1970

Garrison information
- Garrison: 865th Aircraft Control and Warning Squadron

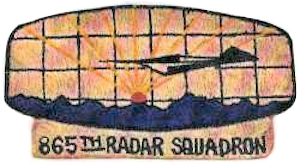
Emblem of the 865th Radar Squadron

Las Vegas Air Force Station (ADC ID: SM-163, NORAD ID: Z-163) is a closed United States Air Force General Surveillance Radar station. It is located 26.5 miles (42.6 km) west-northwest of Las Vegas, Nevada. It was closed by the Air Force in 1969 and turned over to the Federal Aviation Administration (FAA). The site is now data-tied into the Joint Surveillance System (JSS).

== History ==
Las Vegas Air Force Station was initially part of Phase II of the Air Defense Command Mobile Radar program. The Air Force approved this expansion of the Mobile Radar program on 23 October 1952. Radars in this network were designated "SM". The radar site is located on top of Angel Peak, which is north-northwest of the city of Las Vegas, and east of Charleston Peak.

The Air Force constructed about 24 main buildings in two LVAFS areas, the Operations and Cantonment Areas. Construction in the Operations Area consisted of four radar towers, four operational buildings, one water pump station, a power building, and five large above-ground fuel tanks. The Cantonment Area contained approximately five dormitories, a dispensary, a mess hall, an administration building, an automotive shop, a maintenance shop, a storage building, a recreation building, one underground gasoline storage tank, and one large above-ground fuel oil tank. Each building had a smaller day tank for storage of heating oil. Three septic tanks comprised the sewage treatment system.

The station became operational on 1 April 1956 when the 865th Aircraft Control and Warning Squadron was assigned to the new station. The squadron initially used AN/FPS-3 search and AN/MPS-14 height-finder radars at this site, and the station functioned as a Ground-Control Intercept (GCI) and warning station. As a GCI station, the squadron's role was to guide interceptor aircraft toward unidentified intruders picked up on the unit's radar scopes. In 1958 an AN/FPS-20A replaced the AN/FPS-3 search radar.

During 1961 Las Vegas AFS joined the Semi-Automatic Ground Environment (SAGE) system, initially feeding data to DC-21 at Luke AFB, Arizona. After joining, the squadron was redesignated as the 865th Radar Squadron (SAGE) on 15 October 1961. The radar squadron provided information 24/7 the SAGE Direction Center where it was analyzed to determine range, direction, altitude, speed, and whether or not aircraft were friendly or hostile. It also became a joint-use facility with the Federal Aviation Administration (FAA). On 31 July 1963, the site was redesignated as NORAD ID Z-163.

An AN/FPS-26A height-finder radar joined the site in 1963. In 1964 an AN/FPS-27 search radar set was installed, and in 1965 the AN/FPS-20A was retired from Air Force service. Reportedly, the FAA retained this radar set. In 1968 the AN/MPS-14 height-finder radar was removed.

In addition to the main facility, Las Vegas operated several AN/FPS-14 Gap Filler sites:

- Boulder City, Nevada (SM-163A): 35°59′44″N 114°51′48″W, now home to a VOR/DME
- Lathrop Wells, Nevada (SM-163B): 36°38′43″N 116°20′19″W

The 865th Radar Squadron (SAGE) was inactivated 31 December 1969. In 1970 the Air Force relinquished the property to the Department of Interior and transferred accountability for all improvements, with the exception of Buildings 18 and 40, to Clark County. Accountability for Building 18 was transferred to the Atomic Energy Commission (currently DOE) and accountability for Building 40 (Radar Tower FPS-20) was transferred to the Federal Aviation Administration (FAA).

As of 2014, all main buildings in the Operations Area are in use. The FAA operates the radar facility in Building 40. DOE maintains Building 18 and leases space to Nellis Air Force Base, and other government and private entities. Clark County leases all other buildings in the Operations Area to other government and private organizations.

The former Cantonment Area is used by Clark County Juvenile Court Services, Spring Mountain Youth Camp (SMYC). Buildings 5, and 44 have been removed, but the foundations are currently used for various functions. The FAA had operated the AN/FPS-20A as part of the Joint Surveillance System (JSS) until the facility was replaced with a CARSR and ModeS. Both the SMYC and FAA facilities are restricted access.

== Air Force units and assignments ==
=== Units ===
- Constituted as the 865th Aircraft Control and Warning Squadron

Activated at Norton Air Force Base, California on 8 November 1955
Moved to Las Vegas AFS on 25 June 1956
Redesignated 865th Radar Squadron (SAGE) on 15 October 1961
Inactivated on 31 December 1969

=== Assignments ===
- 27th Air Division, 1 April 1956
- Los Angeles Air Defense Sector, 1 October 1959
- Phoenix Air Defense Sector, 1 May 1961
- 27th Air Division, 1 April 1966 – 31 December 1969

== See also ==
- United States general surveillance radar stations
