= Boron Air Force Station =

Closed US Air Force radar station

Boron Air Force Station
- Part of Air Defense Command (ADC)

Site information
- Type: Air Force Station
- Code: ADC ID: P-59, NORAD ID: Z-59
- Controlled by: United States Air Force

Location
- Location of Boron AFS, California
- Coordinates: 35°04′54.1″N 117°34′58.4″W

Site history
- Built: 1952
- In use: 1952–1975

Garrison information
- Garrison: 750th Radar Squadron (SAGE); 750th Aircraft Control and Warning Squadron

Boron Air Force Station is a closed United States Air Force General Surveillance Radar station. It is located 6.8 miles (10.9 km) northeast of Boron, California. It was closed by the Air Force in 1975 and turned over to the Federal Aviation Administration (FAA). The radar site is still operated by the FAA as part of the Joint Surveillance System (JSS).

== History ==
Boron Air Force Station was one of twenty-eight stations built as part of the second segment of the Air Defense Command permanent radar network. Prompted by the start of the Korean War, Secretary of the Air Force Thomas K. Finletter asked Secretary of Defense Louis A. Johnson on 11 July 1950 for approval to expedite construction of the permanent network. Receiving approval 10 days later, the Air Force directed the Army Corps of Engineers to proceed with construction.

The 750th Aircraft Control and Warning Squadron was assigned to Atolia, California, on 28 January 1952. It assumed coverage responsibilities formerly held by the temporary Lashup Radar Network site at Edwards Air Force Base (L-40). It operated two AN/FPS-10 radars and initially functioned as a ground-controlled interception (GCI) and warning station. As a GCI station, the squadron's role was to guide interceptor aircraft toward unidentified intruders. Atolia AFS was renamed Boron Air Force Station on 1 December 1953.

The AN/FPS-10 search radar at Boron remained until 1959. In 1958 an AN/FPS-6 replaced the AN/FPS-10 height finder radar. A second height finder radar (an AN/FPS-6A) was installed in 1959.

During 1961 Boron AFS joined the Semi-Automatic Ground Environment (SAGE) system, feeding data to DC-17 at Norton Air Force Base, California. After joining, the squadron was redesignated as the 750th Radar Squadron (SAGE) on 1 May 1961. The radar squadron provided continuous information to the SAGE Direction Center, where it was analyzed to determine range, direction, altitude, speed, and whether aircraft were friendly or hostile.

A separate Ground Air Transmit Receive (GATR) site was located 3.5 miles NNW of the main site to provide some isolation from the high-powered RF energy from the search radar systems for the GATR's HF/VHF/UHF voice and data air-to-ground communications. GATR sites used voice communications via AN/GRT-3 transmitters and AN/GRR-7 receivers to guide F-106 Delta Dart and other suitably-equipped intercept aircraft to airborne targets. AN/GRC-27 backup transceivers were used to cover frequencies that were lost due to outages of the main transmitters and receivers. In addition to these, an AN/GKA-5 Time Division Data Link (TDDL) system was used to digitally provide the vectoring data to the intercept aircraft.

In addition to the defense mission, Boron AFS became a joint-use facility with the Federal Aviation Administration (FAA) for use in tracking aircraft in the Los Angeles sector. By this time the AN/FPS-10 had been replaced by an AN/FPS-20 search radar. However, this radar was soon replaced by an AN/FPS-35 frequency diversity radar. By 1963 this radar operated with AN/FPS-26A and AN/FPS-90 height-finder radars. Boron AFS was re-designated as NORAD ID Z-59 on 31 July 1963.

In 1968 the AN/FPS-90 was deactivated. In 1969 the AN/FPS-35 was removed, and was replaced by an AN/FPS-67 on the same tower (and with a radome); it became operational in 1970.

In addition to the main facility, Boron operated these AN/FPS-14 gap-filler sites:

- Minter Field Army Airfield (now Shafter Airport), Shafter, CA (P-59A) at 35°30′07″N 119°11′50″W
- Copper Mountain, Joshua Tree, CA (P-76F, P-59C) at 34°09′17″N 116°12′08″W

Over the years, the equipment at the station was upgraded or modified to improve the efficiency and accuracy of the information gathered by the radars. The 750th Radar Squadron was inactivated on 30 June 1975. The FAA retained the AN/FPS-67, and continues to operate it today as part of the Joint Surveillance System (JSS).

In 1979, Boron AFS was converted into Federal Prison Camp, Boron, a minimum-security federal prison for male inmates that was closed in 2000. The prison site and housing area have been completely demolished. The U.S. Department of Justice is currently investigating trespass activity at FPC Boron. All identified instances of trespass are logged, and trespassers may be subject to federal and state prosecution including imprisonment and/or fines.

== Air Force units and assignments ==
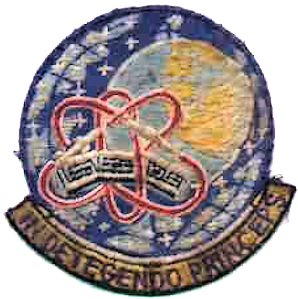
Emblem of the 750th Radar Squadron

=== Units ===
- Constituted as the 750th Aircraft Control and Warning Squadron

Activated at Edwards AFB, California on 8 October 1950
Moved to Atolia, California on 28 January 1952
Site redesignated Boron Air Force Station, 1 December 1953
Redesignated 750th Radar Squadron (SAGE) on 1 May 1961
Redesignated 750th Radar Squadron on 1 February 1974
Inactivated on 30 June 1975

=== Assignments ===
- 544th Aircraft Control and Warning Group, 1 January 1952
- 27th Air Division, 6 February 1952
- Los Angeles Air Defense Sector, 1 October 1959
- 27th Air Division, 1 April 1966
- 26th Air Division, 19 November 1969 – 30 June 1975

== See also ==
- United States general surveillance radar stations
