= 669th Radar Squadron =

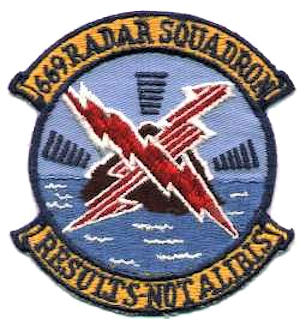
- Emblem of the 669th Radar Squadron
- Active: 1949-1968
- Country: United States
- Branch: United States Air Force
- Type: General Radar Surveillance

The 669th Radar Squadron is an inactive United States Air Force unit. It was last assigned to the 27th Air Division, Aerospace Defense Command, stationed at Lompoc Air Force Station, California. It was discontinued on 18 June 1968.

The unit was a General Surveillance Radar squadron providing for the air defense of the United States.

== Lineage ==
- Established as 669th Aircraft Control and Warning Squadron

Activated on 5 May 1950
Redesignated 669th Radar Squadron (SAGE) on 1 April 1963
Discontinued and inactivated on 18 June 1968

Assignments

- 542d Aircraft Control and Warning Group, 5 May 1950
- 544th Aircraft Control and Warning Group, 27 November 1950 (attached to 27th Air Division)
- 27th Air Division, 6 February 1952
- Los Angeles Air Defense Sector, 1 October 1959
- 27th Air Division, 1 April 1966 – 18 June 1968

Stations

- Fort MacArthur, California, 5 May 1950
- Santa Rosa Island AFS, California, 11 February 1952
- Lompoc AFS, California, 1 April 1963 - 18 June 1968
