= Mount Laguna Air Force Station =

Radar station in California, US 1952–1981

Mount Laguna Air Force Station
- Part of Air Defense Command (ADC)
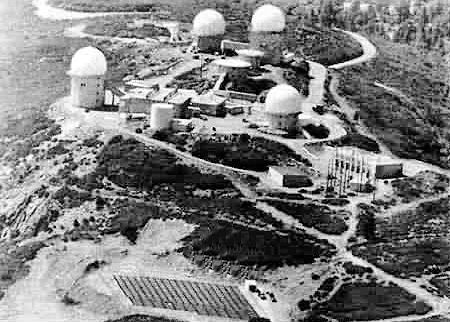
- 1979 USAF photo

Site information
- Type: Air Force Station
- Controlled by: United States Air Force

Location
- Location of Mount Laguna AFS, California
- Coordinates: 32°52′36″N 116°24′54″W

Site history
- Built: 1952
- In use: 1952–1981

Garrison information
- Garrison: 751st Aircraft Control and Warning Squadron

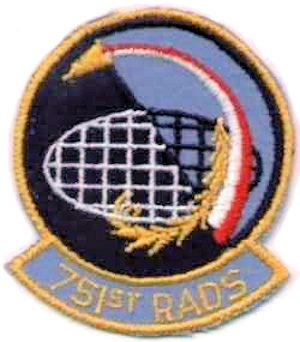
Emblem of the 751st Radar Squadron

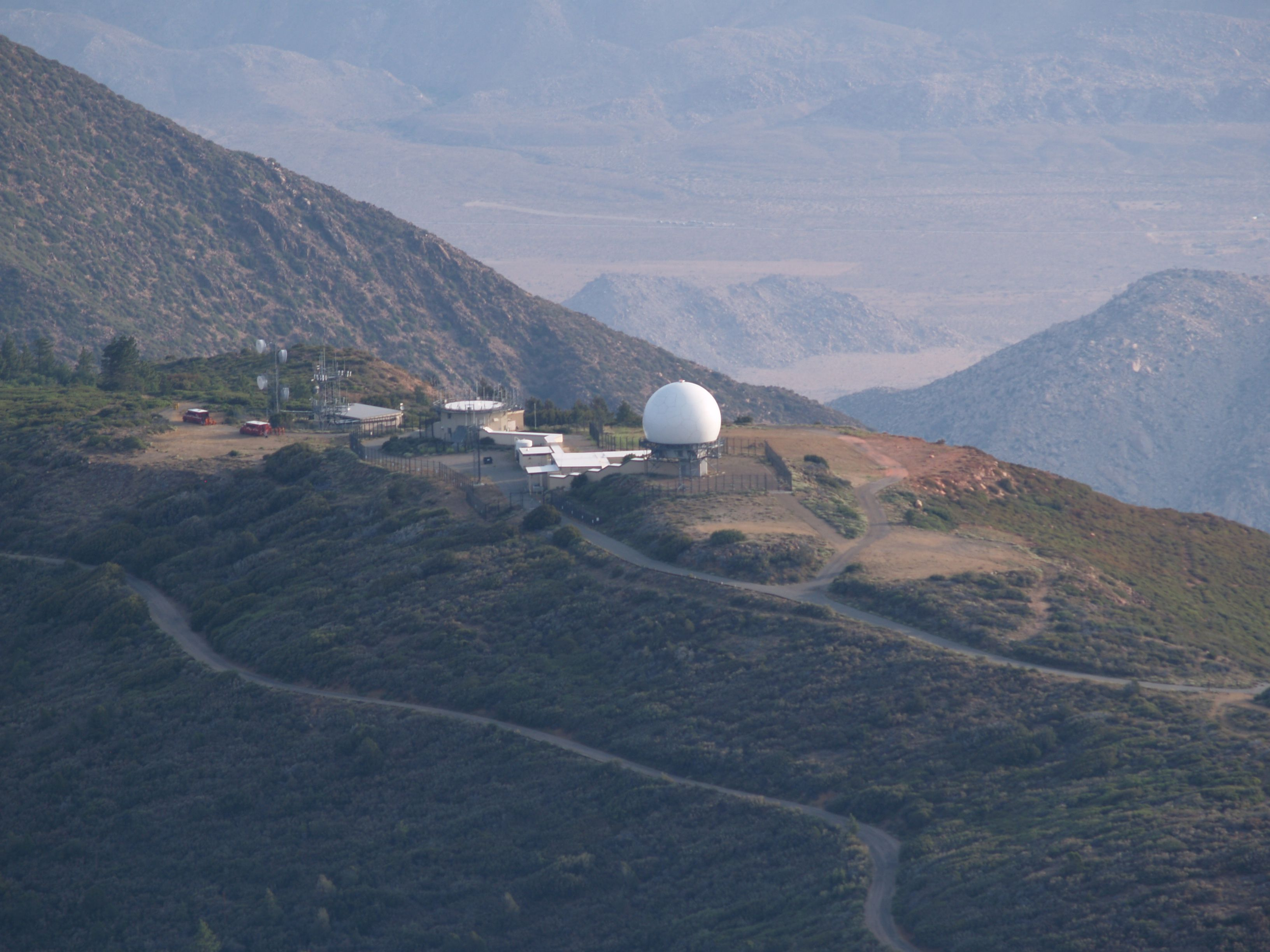
Photo of the Station in 2013.

Mount Laguna Air Force Station (ADC ID: P-76, NORAD ID: Z-76) is a closed United States Air Force General Surveillance Radar station. It is located 24.3 miles (39.1 km) north-northeast of Tecate, California. It was closed in 1981 by the Air Force, and turned over to the Federal Aviation Administration (FAA).

Today the site is part of the Joint Surveillance System (JSS), designated by NORAD as Western Air Defense Sector (WADS) Ground Equipment Facility J-30.

== History ==
Mount Laguna Air Force Station was one of twenty-eight stations built as part of the second segment of the Air Defense Command permanent radar network. Prompted by the start of the Korean War, on July 11, 1950, the Secretary of the Air Force asked the Secretary of Defense for approval to expedite construction of the permanent network. Receiving the Defense Secretary's approval on July 21, the Air Force directed the United States Army Corps of Engineers to proceed with construction.

The 751st Aircraft Control and Warning Squadron was initially assigned to Mount Laguna by September 1951. Within months the radar assumed coverage formerly provided by the Minter Field Lashup site (L-34). At that time the 751st AC&W Squadron operated AN/CPS-4 and AN/FPS-3 radars, and initially the station functioned as a ground control intercept (GCI) and warning station. As a GCI station, the squadron's role was to guide interceptor aircraft toward unidentified intruders picked up on the unit's radar scopes. An AN/FPS-8 replaced the AN/CPS-4 in 1955. This radar then was converted to an AN/GPS-3 in 1956, and removed in 1960. 1956 also saw the arrival of an AN/FPS-6 at the site.

During 1961 Mount Laguna AFS joined the Semi Automatic Ground Environment (SAGE) system, feeding data to DC-17 at Norton AFB, California. After joining, the squadron was redesignated as the 751st Radar Squadron (SAGE) on 1 May 1961. The radar squadron provided information 24/7 to the SAGE Direction Center where it was analyzed to determine range, direction altitude speed and whether or not aircraft were friendly or hostile. By 1962 the 751st operated an AN/FPS-7C search radar and AN/FPS-6 and 6B height-finder radars. In 1963 the -6B was upgraded to an AN/FPS-90 set. Mount Laguna AFS's site number changed to NORAD ID Z-76 on 31 July 1963.

In 1964 the AN/FPS-6 was replaced by an AN/FPS-26A FD height-finder radar; this radar was converted to an AN/FSS-7 SLBM D&W radar in 1966. Mt. Laguna became a joint-use ADC/FAA facility around 1965.

In addition to the main facility, Mount Laguna Air Force Station operated several AN/FPS-14 Gap Filler sites:

- Tecate, CA (P-76A) 32°34′46″N 116°41′20″W
- San Ysidro, CA (P-76B) 32°33′42″N 117°02′06″W
- Tierra del Sol, CA (P-76C) 32°38′53″N 116°19′02″W
- Coyote Wells, CA (P-76D) 32°41′27″N 115°53′21″W
- Moreno, CA (P-76E) 33°57′43″N 117°16′51″W

Over the years, the equipment at the station was upgraded or modified to improve the efficiency and accuracy of the information gathered by the radars. The 751st Radar Sq was inactivated and replaced by the 751st Air Defense Group in March 1970. The upgrade to group status was done because of Mount Laguna AFS' status as a Backup Interceptor Control (BUIC) site. BUIC sites were alternate control sites in the event that SAGE Direction Centers became disabled and unable to control interceptor aircraft. The group was inactivated and replaced by the 751st Radar Squadron as defenses against crewed bombers were reduced. The group was disbanded in 1984. In 1979 Mount Laguna came under Tactical Air Command (TAC) jurisdiction with the inactivation of Aerospace Defense Command and the creation of ADTAC. In the early 1980s the FAA assumed greater control, with the inactivation of the 751st Radar Squadron on 30 September 1981. The FAA replaced the AN/FPS-7E with an ARSR-3 search radar, leaving the Air Force only responsible for the height-finder tower (by then an AN/FPS-116), which was removed c. 1988. In the late 1990s, the ARSR-3 was replaced by the ARSR-4.

Today Mount Laguna is an FAA site, tied into the Joint Surveillance System (JSS). The former Air Force Station has been abandoned since 1981, the facilities in disrepair. The buildings that once housed up to 400 Air Force personnel at Mount Laguna are now gutted shells covered with graffiti and filled with construction debris. For years, U.S. Forest Service officials have wanted to demolish the buildings at the abandoned base, but no money was available.

In 2009, funds became available for site restoration and the barracks, administration building, mess hall and other buildings that made up the Laguna Mountain Air Force Base have been torn down using money from $18.2 million in stimulus funds for Forest Service facilities in disrepair in 14 California counties.

== Air Force units and assignments ==
=== Units ===
Squadron

- Constituted as the 751st Aircraft Control and Warning Squadron on 14 November 1950

Activated at Port Hueneme, California on 27 November 1950
Moved to Mount Laguna AFS, September 1951
Redesignated 751st Radar Squadron (SAGE), 1 May 1961
Inactivated on 1 March 1970
Redesignated 751st Radar Squadron on 1 January 1974
Activated on 17 January 1974
Inactivated on 30 September 1981

Group

- Constituted as the 751st Air Defense Group on 13 February 1970

Activated on 1 March 1970
Inactivated on 17 January 1975
Disbanded on 21 September 1984

==== Commanders ====
- 751st Radar Squadron

Col. Fred C. Faupel Jr., unknown – 1 March 1970

- 751st Air Defense Group

Col. Fred C. Faupel Jr., 1 March 1970 – unknown

- 751st Radar Squadron

Maj. Harlie B. Johnson, August 1964 – August 1965

=== Assignments ===
- Squadron

544th Aircraft Control and Warning Group, 1 February 1952
27th Air Division, 6 February 1952
Los Angeles Air Defense Sector, 1 October 1959
27th Air Division, 1 April 1966
26th Air Division, 19 November 1969 – 1 March 1970
26th Air Division, 17 January 1974 – 30 September 1981

- Group

26th Air Division, 1 March 1970 – 17 January 1974

== See also ==
- United States general surveillance radar stations
