= 777th Radar Squadron =

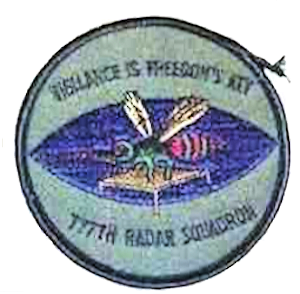
- Emblem of the 777th Radar Squadron
- Active: 1951-1981;1988-1991
- Country: United States
- Branch: United States Air Force
- Type: General Radar Surveillance

The 777th Radar Squadron is an inactive United States Air Force unit. It was last assigned to the Northwest Air Defense Sector, Tactical Air Command, stationed at Mountain Home Air Force Base, Idaho. It was inactivated on 15 September 1991.

From 1951-1981, the unit was a General Surveillance Radar squadron providing for the air defense of North America. From 1988 to 1991 it operated Over The Horizion Backscatter (OTH-B) radar for Tactical Air Command.

== Lineage ==
- Constituted as the 777th Aircraft Control and Warning Squadron

Activated on 18 December 1950
Redesignated as 777th Radar Squadron (SAGE) on 15 July 1960
Redesignated as 777th Radar Squadron on 1 February 1974
Inactivated on 30 September 1980
Activated on 1 October 1988
Inactivated on 15 September 1991

== Assignments ==
- 542d Aircraft Control and Warning Group, 18 December 1950
- 28th Air Division, 6 February 1952
- 25th Air Division, 1 March 1959
- Portland Air Defense Sector, 1 March 1960
- 26th Air Division, 1 April 1966
- 25th Air Division, 15 September 1969 - 30 September 1980
- Northwest Air Defense Sector 1 October 1988 - 15 September 1991

== Stations ==
- Klamath AFS, California, 18 December 1950 - 30 September 1981
- Mountain Home AFB, Idaho, 1 October 1988 - 15 September 1991 (HQ Site)

Christmas Valley AFS, Oregon (OTH-B Transmitter site)
Tule Lake AFS, California (OTH-B Receiver site)

== See also ==
- Over-the-horizon radar
- List of United States Air Force aircraft control and warning squadrons
