= 15th Test and Evaluation Squadron =

US Air Force unit

15th Test and Evaluation Squadron

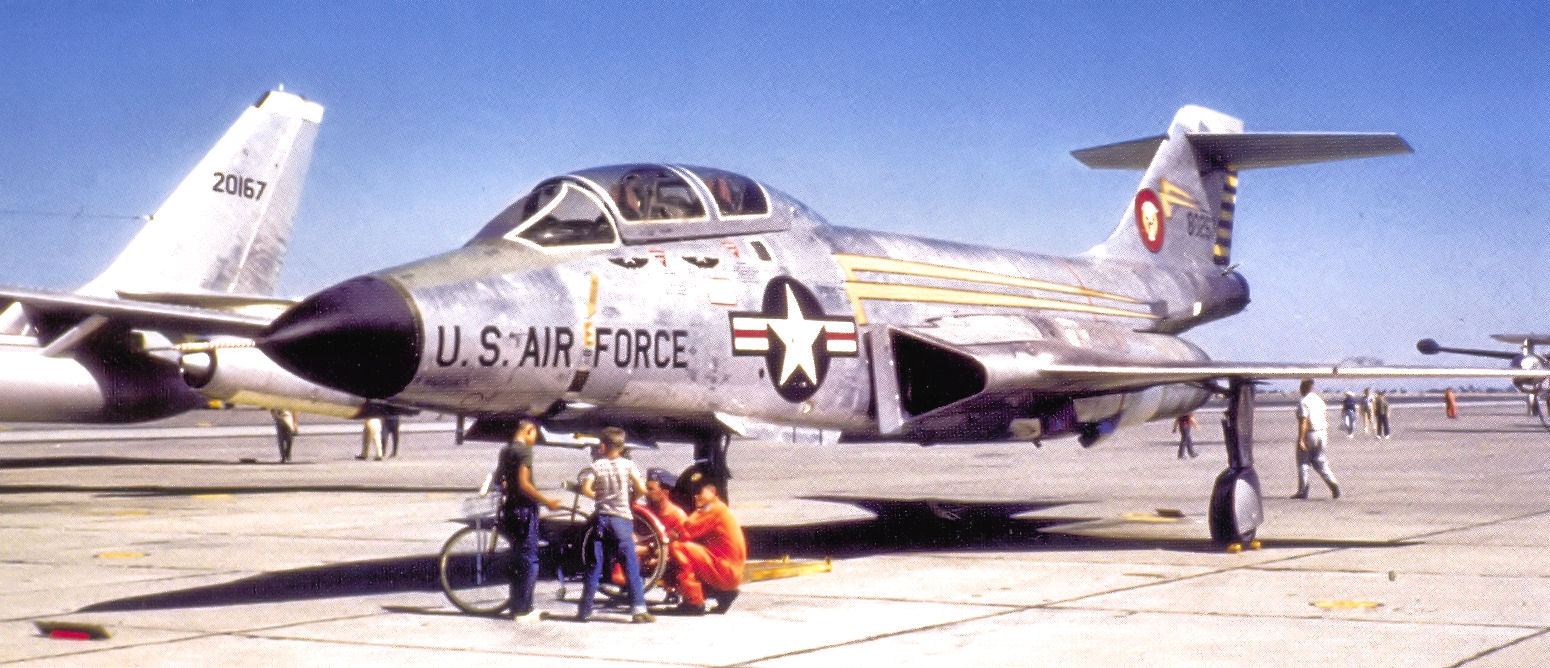
- 15th Fighter-Interceptor Squadron McDonnell F-101B Voodoo at Davis Monthan AFB in May 1961
- Active: 1940–1944; 1947–1949; 1953–1964; 1967–1968; 1988–1994; 2016–present
- Country: United States
- Branch: United States Air Force
- Role: Operational test and evaluation
- Garrison/HQ: Eglin AFB, Florida
- Engagements: Defense of the Panama Canal
- Decorations: Air Force Outstanding Unit Award

Insignia
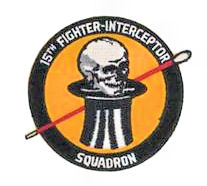
- 15th Fighter-Interceptor Squadron emblem (Note: Approved 28 July 1943.)

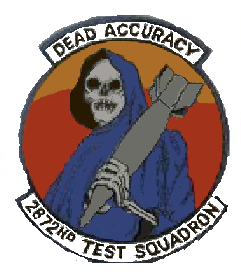
- 2872d Test Squadron emblem

The 15th Test and Evaluation Squadron is a United States Air Force unit, stationed at Eglin Air Force Base, Florida and assigned to the 753rd Test and Evaluation Group. It was first activated in the expansion of the United States military forces prior to World War II as the 15th Pursuit Squadron. It moved to Panama in 1942, where it participated in the defense of the Panama Canal. It returned to the United States, where it was a Replacement Training Unit for fighter pilots until 1944, when it was disbanded as the 15th Fighter Squadron in a reorganization of Army Air Forces training units in 1944

The squadron was reconstituted in the reserve from 1947 to 1949, but does not appear to have been fully manned or equipped with operational aircraft. It was redesignated the 15th Fighter-Interceptor Squadron and served in the air defense of the United States from 1953 until inactivated in 1964, flying a series of more capable interceptor aircraft. In 1967, it was redesignated the 15th Tactical Fighter Squadron and served for a year training McDonnell Douglas F-4 Phantom II pilots, mainly for the Vietnam War.

The squadron's second antecedent was activated in 1988 as the 2872d Test Squadron to perform flight tests on General Dynamics F-16 Fighting Falcons. In 1992, the two squadrons were consolidated with the designation 15th Test Squadron. The squadron was inactivated in 1994.

Redesignated the 15th Test Flight, the unit was reactivated in 2016 at Eglin Air Force Base, Florida. It became the 15th Test and Evaluation Squadron in October 2021.

== History ==
=== World War II ===
The first predecessor of the squadron was activated as the 15th Pursuit Squadron in early 1941 as part of the Southeast Air District. It was equipped with a series of pursuit aircraft with a mission of air defense of Florida. After the Pearl Harbor Attack, the squadron was assigned to the Caribbean Air Force in Panama where it operated in defense of the Panama Canal. It returned to the United States in early 1943 where it became a Republic P-47 Thunderbolt (later North American P-51 Mustang) replacement training unit for III Fighter Command. It was disbanded on 1 May 1944 as part of a reorganization of training units.

=== Air Defense ===
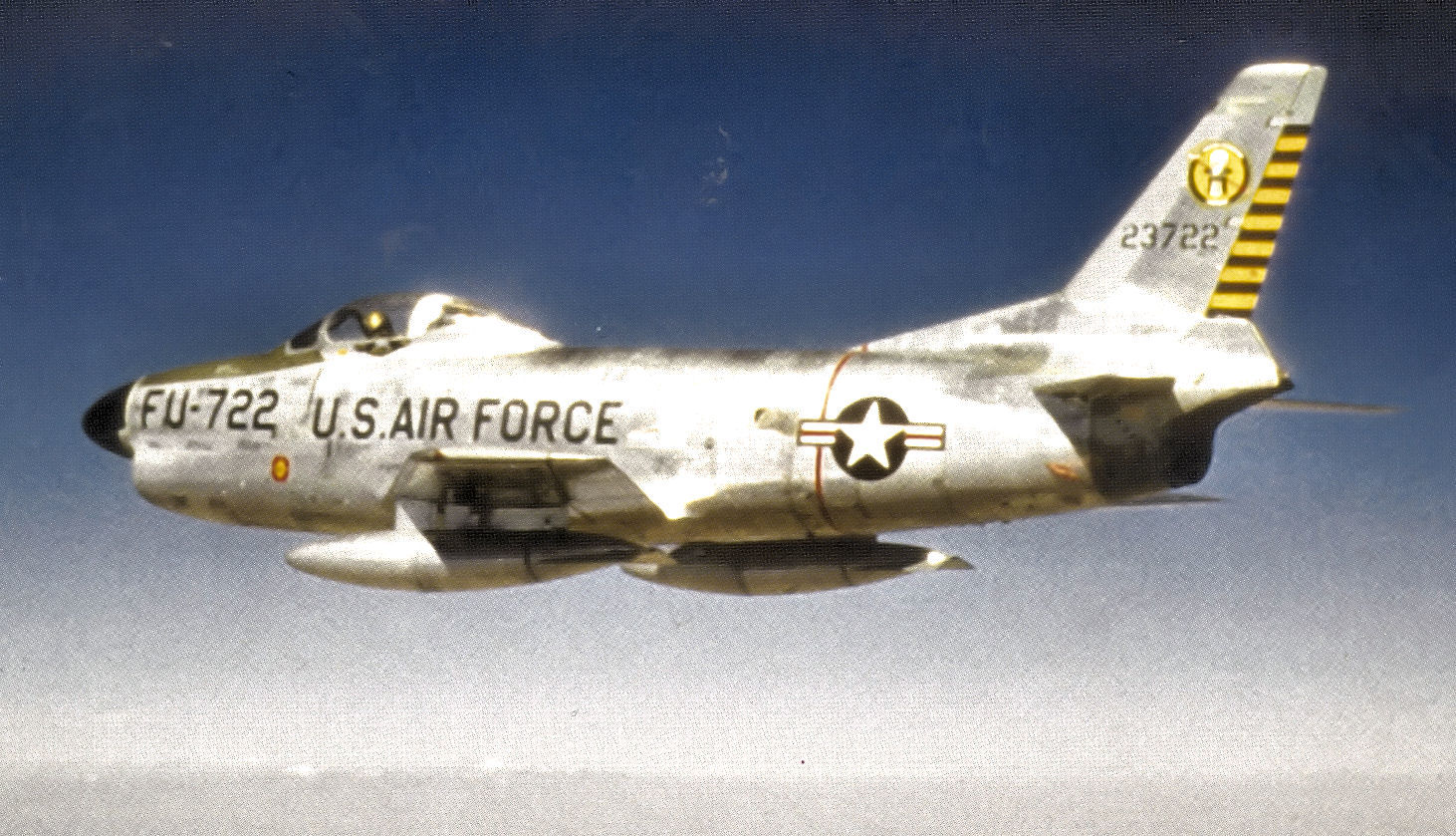
F-86D from Davis-Monthan AFB in 1957 (Note: Aircraft is North American F-86D-40-NA Sabre, serial 52-3722 of the 34th Air Division.)

The squadron was reactivated in 1953 as the 15th Fighter-Interceptor Squadron, part of Air Defense Command. It was equipped with North American F-86A Sabre day fighters at Davis-Monthan Air Force Base, Arizona with a mission of air defense of the Southwest United States. It Re-equipped in 1954 with North American F-86D Sabres. In 1957 it began re-equipping with the F-86L, an improved version of the F-86D which incorporated the Semi Automatic Ground Environment, or SAGE computer-controlled direction system for intercepts. The service of the F-86L destined to be quite brief, since by the time the last F-86L conversion was delivered, the type was already being phased out in favor of supersonic interceptors.

In 1960 the squadron received the new McDonnell F-101B Voodoo supersonic interceptor, and the F-101F operational and conversion trainer. The two-seat trainer version was equipped with dual controls, but carried the same armament as the F-101B and were fully combat-capable. On 22 October 1962, before President John F. Kennedy told Americans that missiles were in place in Cuba, the squadron dispersed one third of its force, equipped with nuclear tipped missiles to Williams Air Force Base at the start of the Cuban Missile Crisis. These planes returned to Davis-Monthan after the crisis.

In the early 1960s, the Air Force implemented Project Clearwater, an initiative to withdraw Convair F-102 Delta Daggers from overseas bases in order to reduce "gold flow" (negative foreign currency transactions). By 1963, part of this plan called for the 16th Fighter-Interceptor Squadron at Naha Air Base to move to Davis-Monthan, (Note: The original plan was to move the 16th to Edwards Air Force Base, but military construction costs to base the squadron there were prohibitive, so Davis-Monthan was selected. McMullen, pp. 60–61) permitting the 15th's F-101s to be distributed to other ADC squadrons. Because there would be a gap between the transfer of the 15th's F-101s and the arrival of the 16th's F-102s, eight F-102s from Perrin Air Force Base would maintain alert at Davis-Monthan. As another cost saving move, planning called for the 16th to be inactivated upon arrival at Davis-Monthan and the 15th to assume its aircraft. However, the Gulf of Tonkin Incident intervened and the 16th was kept in the Pacific to maintain an air defense capability there. Headquarters, USAF directed ADC to simply inactivate the 15th with no replacement. The squadron degraded to a marginally combat ready status by October 1964 and was inactivated in December.

=== Flight test operations ===
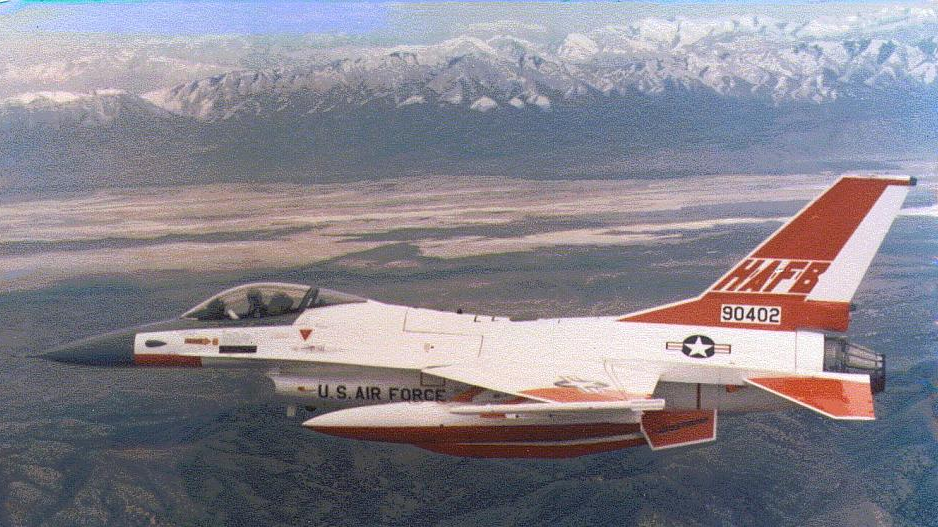
F-16 of the 2872d Test Squadron on a flight near Hill Air Force Base, Utah

The 2872d Test Squadron was activated at Hill Air Force Base, Utah to perform flight tests on General Dynamics F-16 Fighting Falcons that had undergone major overhaul or modification. In 1992 the squadron was consolidated with the 15th Fighter-Interceptor Squadron as the 15th Test Squadron.

== Lineage ==
15th Test Squadron

- Constituted as the 15th Pursuit Squadron (Interceptor) on 20 November 1940

Activated on 15 January 1941
Redesignated 15th Fighter Squadron on 15 May 1942
Disbanded on 1 May 1944

- Reconstituted on 10 March 1947

Activated in the reserve on 12 March 1947
Inactivated on 27 June 1949

- Redesignated 15th Fighter-Interceptor Squadron on 11 February 1953

Activated on 20 April 1953
Discontinued and inactivated on 24 December 1964

- Redesignated 15th Tactical Fighter Squadron, activated and organized on 30 June 1967

Discontinued and inactivated on 30 March 1968

- Consolidated on 1 October 1992 with the 2872d Test Squadron as the 15th Test Squadron

Inactivated 1 April 1994

- Redesignated 15th Test Flight on 9 February 2016

Activated on 1 March 2016
Redesignated 15th Test and Evaluation Squadron on 1 October 2021

2872d Test Squadron

- Designated as the 2872d Test Squadron and activated on 15 January 1988
- Consolidated on 1 October 1992 with the 15th Fighter-Interceptor Squadron as the 15th Test Squadron

=== Assignments ===
- 53d Pursuit Group (later 53d Fighter Group), 15 January 1941 – 1 May 1944
- Eleventh Air Force, 12 March 1947 (Note: This is not the current Eleventh Air Force, but a different unit active to manage reserve forces in the late 1940s, when the current air force was designated Alaskan Air Command.)
- 419th Troop Carrier Group, 30 September 1947 – 27 June 1949
- 34th Air Division, 20 April 1953
- Los Angeles Air Defense Sector, 1 January 1960
- Phoenix Air Defense Sector, 1 May 1961 – 4 December 1964
- 4531st Tactical Fighter Wing, 30 June 1967 – 30 March 1968
- Ogden Air Logistics Center, 15 January 1988
- 545th Test Group, 21 March 1993 – 1 April 1994
- 53d Wing, 1 March 2016
- 753d Test and Evaluation Group, 1 October 2021 – present

=== Stations ===
- MacDill Field, Florida, 15 January 1941
- Dale Mabry Field, Florida, 8 May – 18 December 1941
- La Chorrera Airfield, Panama, 2 January – 10 November 1942
- Dale Mabry Field, Florida, 26 November 1942
- Drew Field, Florida, 6 January 1943
- Page Field, Florida, 5 February 1943 – 1 May 1944.
- Andrews Field (later Andrews Air Force Base), Maryland, 12 March 1947 – 27 June 1949.
- Davis Monthan Air Force Base, Arizona, 20 April 1953 – 4 December 1964
- Homestead Air Force Base, Florida, 30 June 1967 – 30 March 1968
- Hill Air Force Base, Utah, 15 January 1988 – 1 April 1994
- Eglin Air Force Base, Florida, 1 March 2016 – present

=== Aircraft ===
- Seversky P-35, 1941
- Curtiss P-40 Warhawk 1941
- Bell P-39 Airacobra, 1941–1943
- North American P-51 Mustang, 1943
- Republic P-47 Thunderbolt, 1943–1944
- North American F-86A Sabre, 1953
- North American F-86D Sabre, 1954–1957
- North American F-86L Sabre 1957–1959
- Northrop F-89J Scorpion, 1959–1960
- McDonnell F-101B Voodoo, 1960–1964
- McDonnell F-4 Phantom II, 1967-1968
- General Dynamics F-16 Fighting Falcon, 1988–1994
