= Christmas Valley Air Force Station =

US Air Force radar station in Oregon

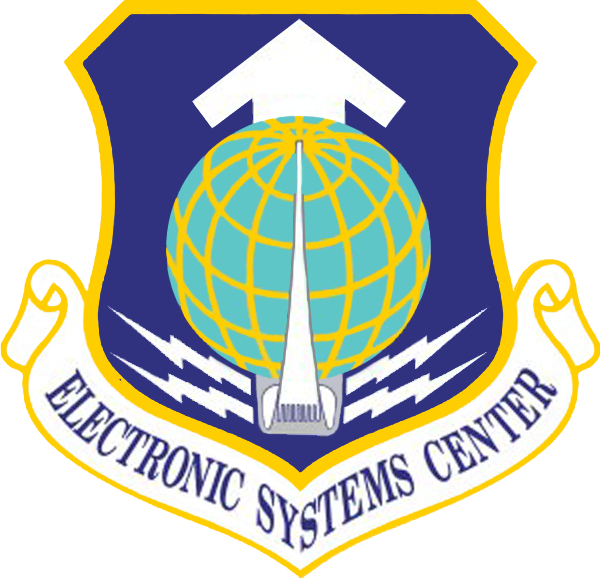
Christmas Valley Air Force Station
- Part of Electronic Systems Division; Air Force Materiel Command (AFMC)

Site information
- Type: Air Force Station
- Controlled by: United States Air Force
- Condition: Cold storage/deactivated

Location
- Location of Christmas Valley AFS, Oregon
- Coordinates: 43°16′45″N 120°22′45″W

Site history
- Built: 1980s
- Built by: GE Aerospace
- In use: 1985-1997
- Materials: AN/FPS-118 Rx over-the-horizon backscatter radar array

Garrison information
- Garrison: 777 Radar Squadron

Christmas Valley Air Force Station is a closed United States Air Force radar station. It is located about 16 miles east of the community of Christmas Valley, Oregon. It was closed in 1997.

== History ==
Development of Christmas Valley AFS can be traced to work undertaken by USAF Rome Air Development Center (RADC) engineers in the early 1970s who were developing an over the horizon backscatter radar (OTH-B) system. The system was based on a frequency modulation/continuous wave (FM/CW) radar capable of detecting and tracking objects at over-the-horizon ranges. In concept it involved bouncing radar signals off the ionosphere which allows radar to overcome the curvature of the Earth.

A small scale test receiver/transmitter was established in central western Maine at what would become Moscow AFS by the early 1980s. Initial testing was conducted from June 1980 to June 1981. Successful testing resulted in the decision to develop operational OTH-B systems for the east and west coasts and in Alaska.

The west coast OTH-B system was designed and built by GE Aerospace and consisted of an AN/FPS-118 radar with the transmitter located at Christmas Valley AFS and the receiver at the newly constructed Tule Lake AFS, California. The transmitter and receiver stations were staffed by personnel of the 777th Radar Squadron. Data processing took place at Mountain Home AFB, Idaho.

The fall of the Soviet Union and end of the Cold War saw the OTH-B systems rendered obsolete for detecting intruding military aircraft, however, the OTH-B continued operations until 1997 and its data saw use by the United States Border Patrol for tracking aircraft used by drug smugglers, as well as the National Oceanic and Atmospheric Administration which made use of the measurements of ocean currents and weather patterns.

The facility was placed in "warm storage" in 1997 and in 2002 it was deactivated and placed in "cold storage" with equipment removed from the site.

== Modern Use ==
Dartmouth College operates two SuperDARN radars on the southern side of the property, under the code cvw and cve.

== Gallery ==
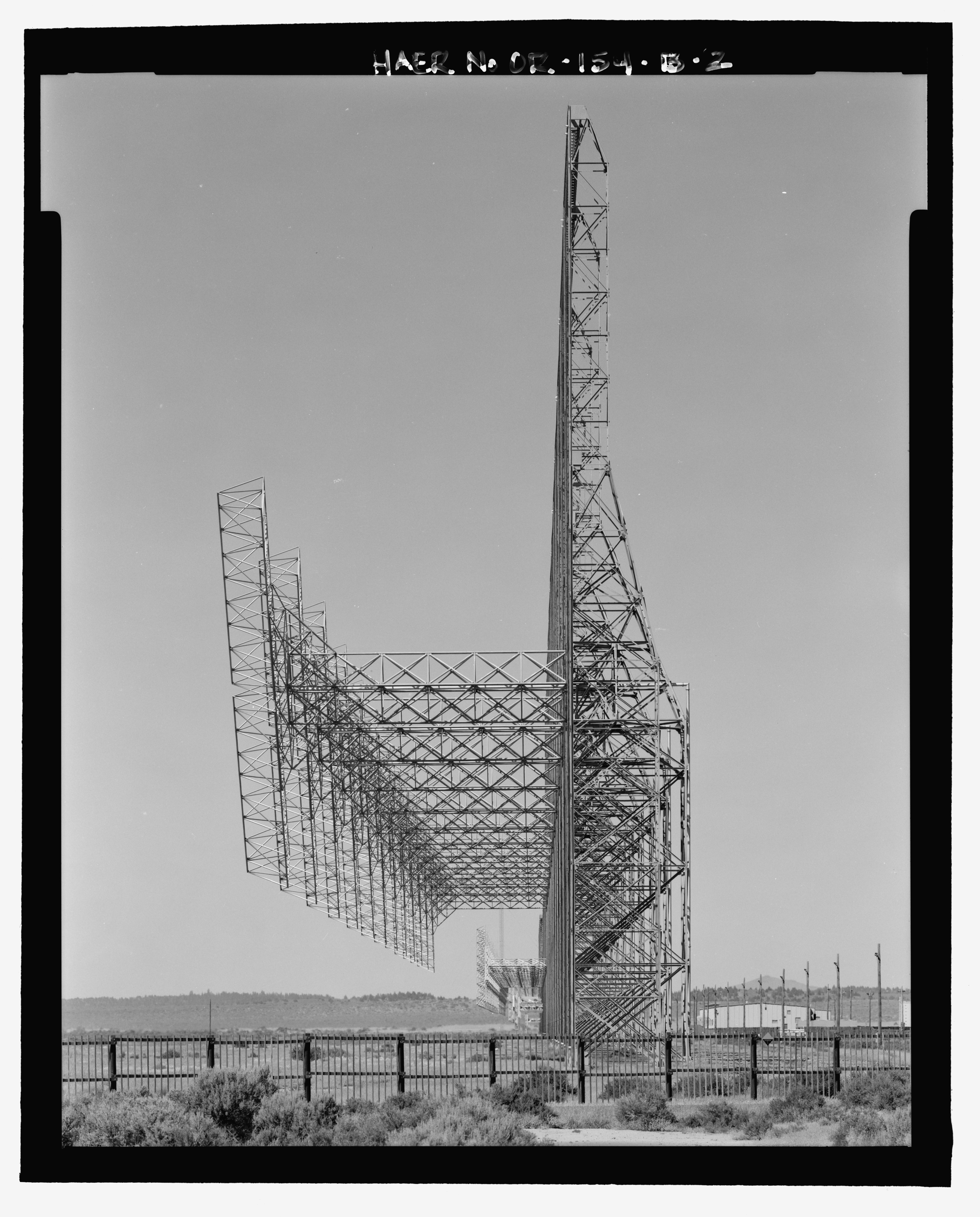

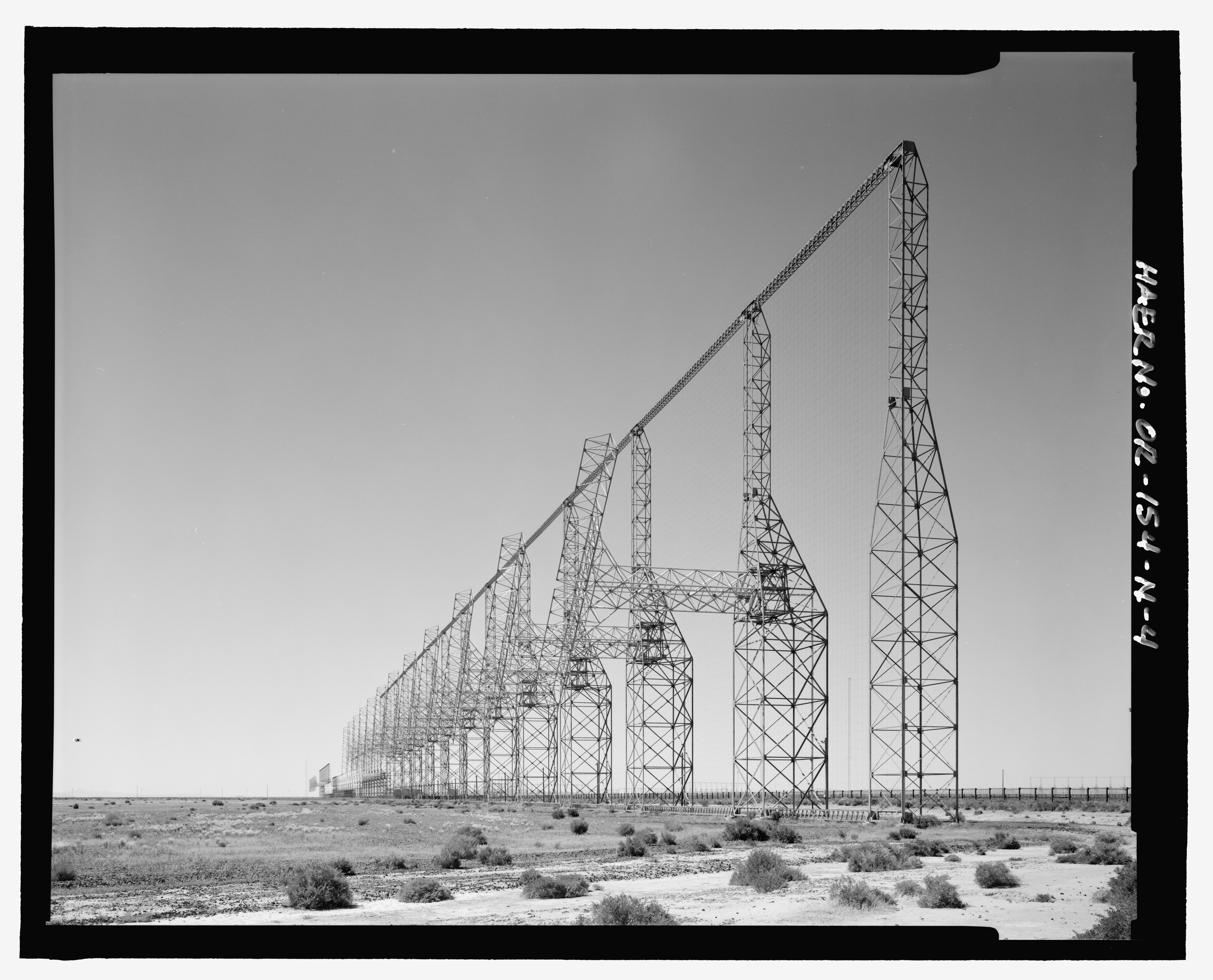

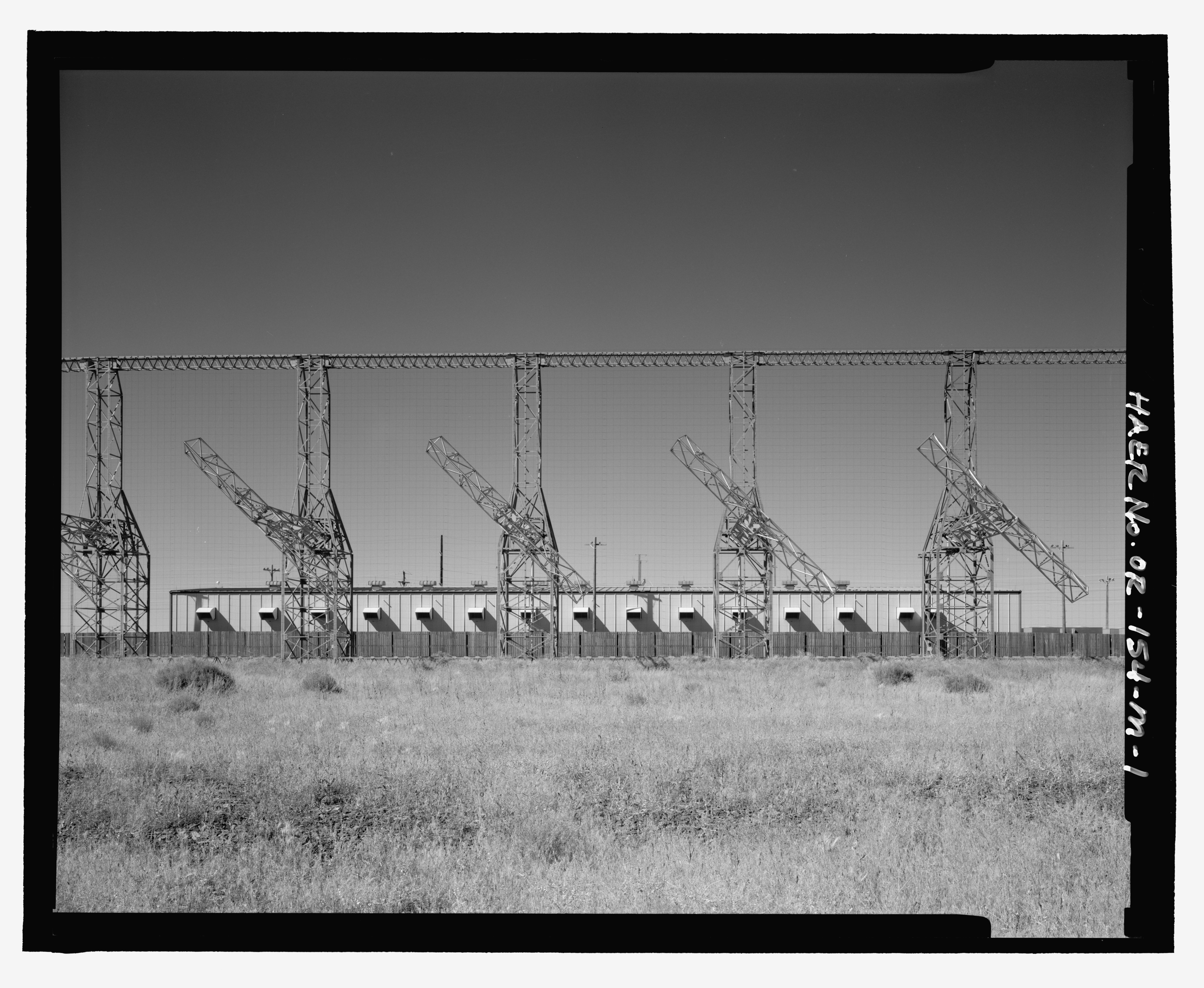

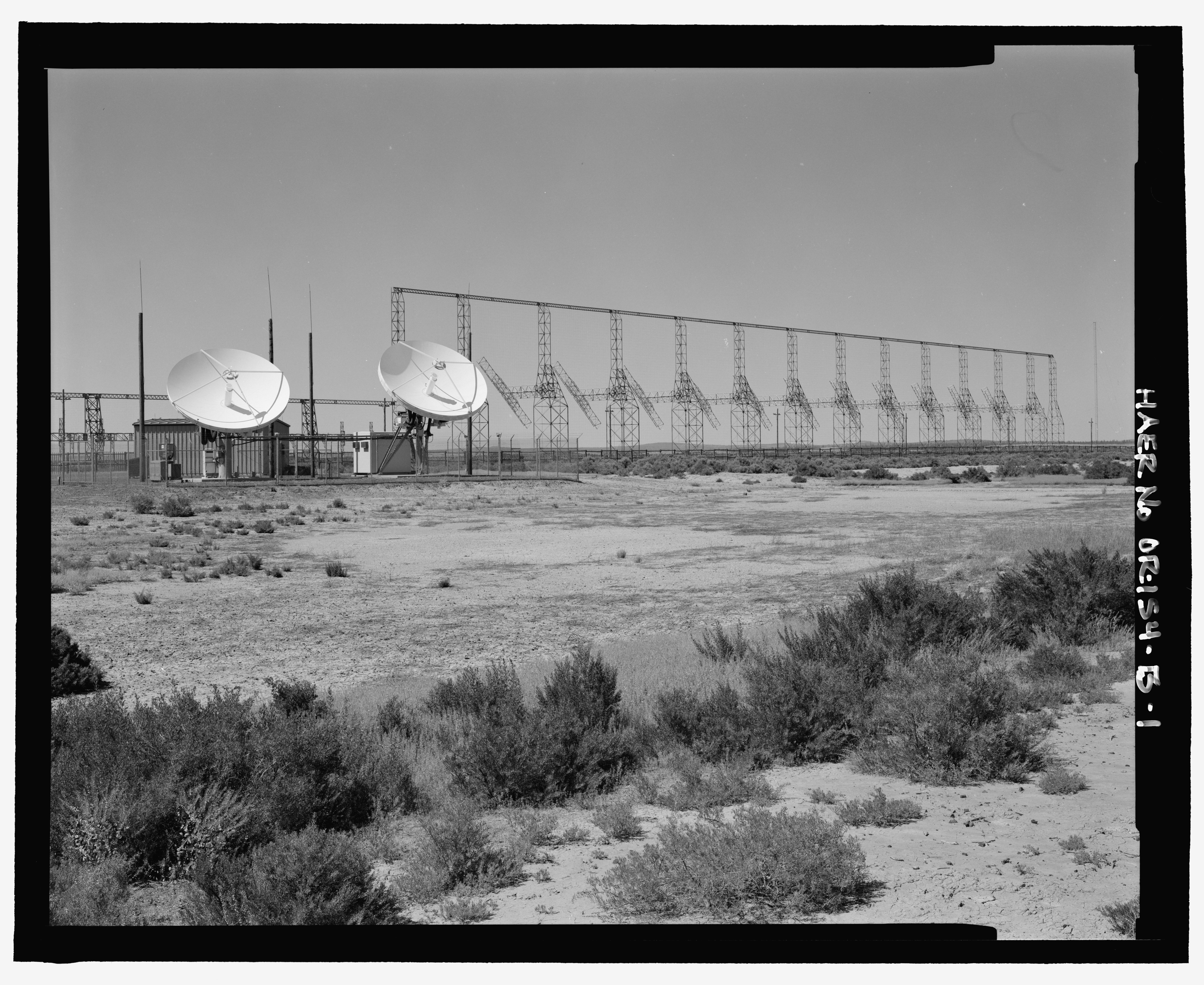

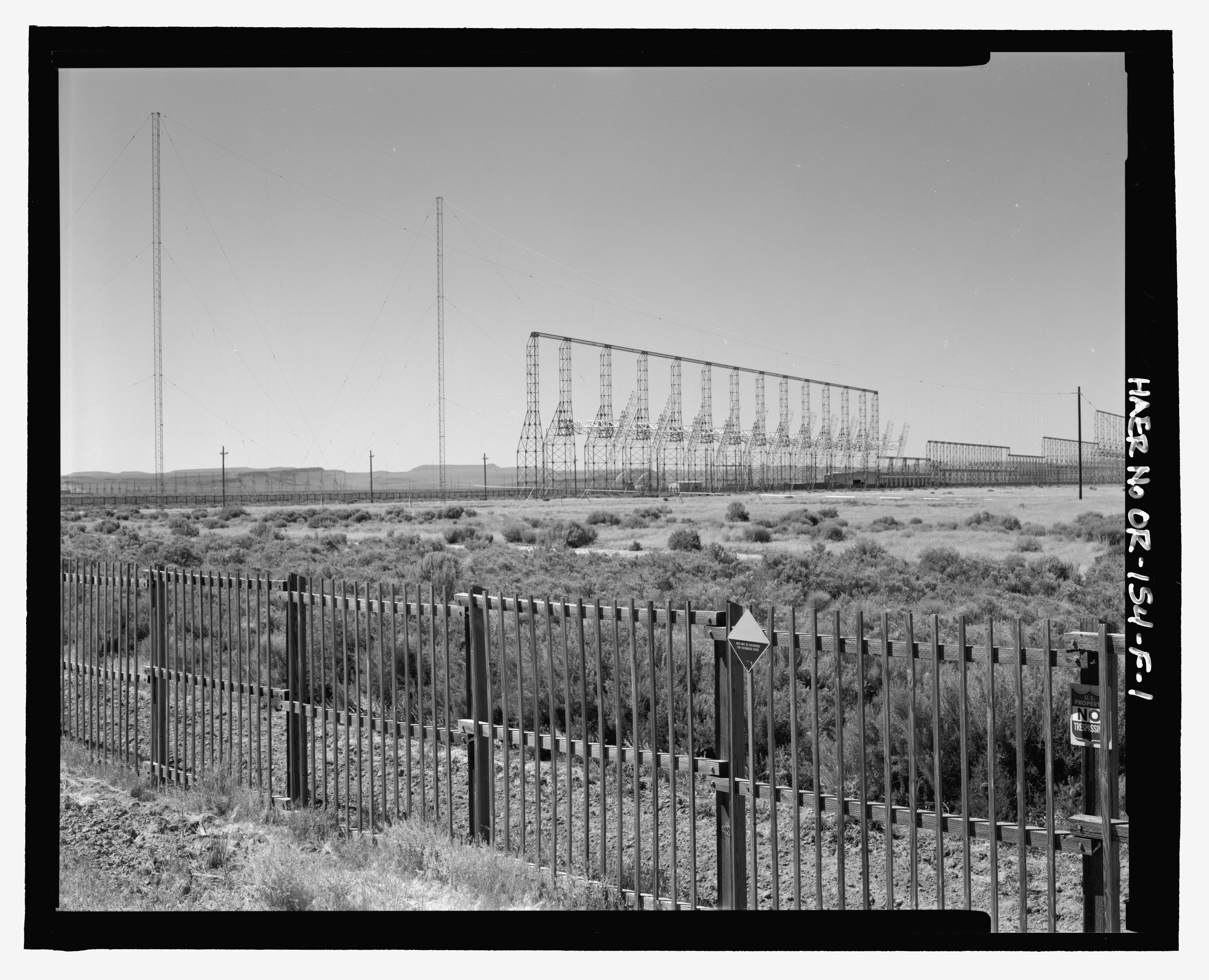
