= 864th Aircraft Control and Warning Squadron =

Former US Air Force unit

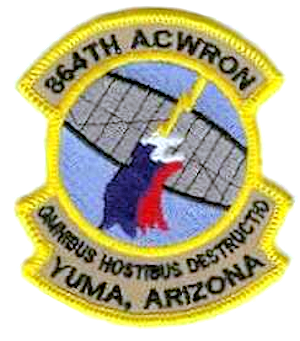
- Emblem of the 864th Aircraft Control and Warning Squadron
- Active: 1955-1963
- Country: United States
- Branch: United States Air Force
- Type: General Radar Surveillance

The 864th Aircraft Control and Warning Squadron is an inactive United States Air Force unit. It was last assigned to the Phoenix Air Defense Sector, Air Defense Command, stationed at Yuma Air Force Station, Arizona. It was inactivated on 1 August 1963.

The unit was a General Surveillance Radar squadron providing for the air defense of the United States.

== Lineage ==
- Constituted as the 864th Aircraft Control and Warning Squadron

Activated on 8 August 1955
Redesignated 864th Radar Squadron (SAGE), 1 June 1962
Redesignation retroactively revoked
Discontinued and inactivated on 1 August 1963

== Assignments ==
- 27th Air Division, 8 August 1955
- Los Angeles Air Defense Sector, 1 October 1959
- Phoenix Air Defense Sector, 1 May 1961 – 1 August 1963

Stations

- Yuma County Airport, Arizona, 8 August 1955

Base redesignated Vincent AFB, 1 September 1956
Station redesignated Yuma AFS, 20 July 1962 – 1 August 1963
