= Santa Rosa Island Air Force Station =

Closed United States Air Force General Surveillance Radar station

Santa Rosa Island Air Force Station
- Part of Air Defense Command (ADC)

Site information
- Type: Air Force Station
- Controlled by: United States Air Force

Location
- Location of Santa Rosa Island AFS, California
- Coordinates: 34°00′26″N 120°03′01″W

Site history
- Built: 1951
- In use: 1951–1963

Garrison information
- Garrison: 669th Aircraft Control and Warning Squadron

Santa Rosa Island Air Force Station (ADC ID: P-15) is a closed United States Air Force General Surveillance Radar station. It is located 5.8 miles (9.3 km) southwest of the Santa Rosa Island dock, California. It was closed in 1963.

== History ==
Santa Rosa Island AFS was one of 28 stations built as part of the second segment of the Air Defense Command permanent radar network. Prompted by the start of the Korean War, on July 11, 1950, the Secretary of the Air Force asked the Secretary of Defense for approval to expedite construction of the permanent network. Receiving the Defense Secretary’s approval on July 21, the Air Force directed the Corps of Engineers to proceed with construction. Santa Rosa Island AFS was one of two offshore radar stations built off the Southern California coast, the other being on San Clemente Island.

The 669th Aircraft Control and Warning Squadron was initially assigned by the 27th Air Division to Santa Rosa AFS on 11 February 1952. The squadron initially used an AN/CPS-6B radar which allowed for the shutdown of the temporary Lashup sites at Camp Cooke (L-41) and Port Hueneme (L-42), and initially the station functioned as a Ground-Control Intercept (GCI) and warning station. As a GCI station, the squadron's role was to guide interceptor aircraft toward unidentified intruders picked up on the unit's radar scopes. Later in 1952 the squadron received two AN/FPS-10 radars at this island location. In 1955 the Air Force added an AN/FPS-3 search radar to the facility. During the following year, an AN/GPS-3 search radar was also added. 1958 saw the addition of an AN/MPS-14 long-range height-finder radar.

In 1958, plans were made to relocate the 669th AC&W Sq from Santa Rosa Island to the mainland. Operations ceased on 31 March 1963 due to budget reductions, and the squadron moved to Lompoc AFS (RP-15), where support could be provided to the site by Vandenberg AFB. Today the site of the former Santa Rosa Island Air Force Station has been obliterated, the land returned to its natural state by the National Park Service.

== See also ==
- List of USAF Aerospace Defense Command General Surveillance Radar Stations
