= Super Combat Center =

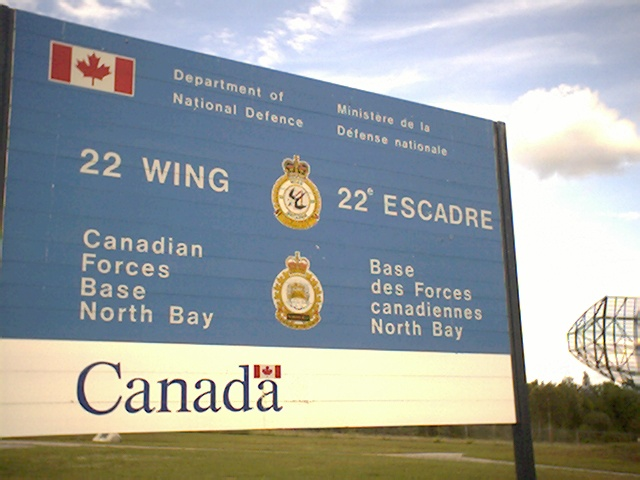
- The CFB North Bay underground bunker had been planned for a Super Combat Center but was equipped with a vacuum tube AN/FSQ-7 Combat Direction Central after the Q-7 successor, the solid-state AN/FSQ-32, was cancelled.

Site information
- Type: military installation

Site history
- Built: 5 SCCs complete by May 1964; 5 SCC/DCs complete by May 1964; 3 above ground sectors with AN/FSQ-32 centrals

A Super Combat Center (SCC) was a planned Cold War command and control facility for ten NORAD regions/Air Divisions in Canada and the United States. For installation in nuclear bunkers, the command posts were to replace the last of the planned Air Defense Command Combat Centers to be built for vacuum tube AN/FSQ-8 Combat Control Centrals.

The survivable SCCs were to use solid-state (transistorized) AN/FSQ-32 equipment which was to provide the Semi-Automatic Ground Environment for operators at 10 Air Divisions — 5 of the centers were to also serve as Air Defense Direction Centers ("SCC/DCs") for commanding ground-controlled interception in sectors of the 27th, 30th, 32nd, 33rd, and 35th Air Divisions. ADC's November 1958 plan to complete the hardened SCCs by April 1964 included fielding 3 additional AN/FSQ-32 systems above-ground for the Albuquerque, Miami, and Shreveport sectors. (Plans for vacuum tube AN/FSQ-7 Combat Direction Centrals to be installed in hardened "cube" buildings were continued for 21 SAGE Air Defense Direction Centers for most of the 27 NORAD Sectors.)

== Description ==
SCCs were to be able to withstand 200 psi (1,400 kPa) overpressure as from a nuclear explosion. Some caverns were to be excavated in mountains: Kennesaw Mountain GA and Whitehorse Mountain NY for the Raleigh and Syracuse sectors, respectively. In 1956, ARDC had sponsored "development of a transistorized…computer" by IBM and in June 1958, the "SAGE Solid State Computer…was estimated to have a computing capability of seven times" the AN/FSQ-7. ADC's November 1958 plan to field—by April 1964—the 13 solid state AN/FSQ-7A (designated AN/FSQ-32 after December 1958) was for divisions at Ottawa, St Louis, San Antonio, Raleigh, Syracuse, Chicago, Spokane, Minot, Portland, Phoenix, and 3 above-ground sites for Miami, Albuquerque, and Shreveport divisions. By December 1959 an SCC was also planned for the 26th Air Division (Denver Air Defense Sector).

== Cancellation ==
DoD's June 19, 1959, Continental Air Defense Program reduced the number of SCCs to 7 and on December 9, 1959, the USAF eliminated both the SCC for the Denver sector and the Albuquerque sector's above-ground AN/FSQ-32. On December 21, 1959, the Office of Defense Research and Engineering informed NORAD a stop order had been placed on AN/FSQ-32 production and in January 1960, the Office of the Secretary of Defense recommended the SCC program be canceled (cancellation was March 18, 1960.)

The canceled SAGE SCC/DC planned for the 35th NORAD Region/Ottawa Air Defense Sector was replaced with the only vacuum tube AN/FSQ-7 deployed underground. Construction of CFB North Bay for the Ottawa sector had started in 1959 for a bunker ~700 feet (210 m) underground, and the facility was used for DC-31 (operational October 1, 1963) (3 AN/FSQ-8 Combat Centers were operational in 1963.) To replace the GCI contingency capability that SCCs would have provided when an AN/FSQ-7 Direction Center and its neighboring DCs had been incapacitated, Air Defense Command deployed pre-SAGE General Electric AN/GPA-37 Course Directing Groups at NORAD Control Centers and other dispersed sites for Back-Up Interceptor Control.
