= Phoenix Air Defense Sector =

Phoenix Air Defense Sector

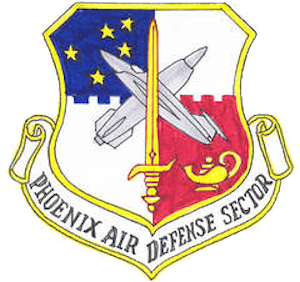
- Emblem of the Phoenix Air Defense Sector
- Active: 1960–1966
- Country: United States
- Branch: United States Air Force
- Role: Air Defense
- Part of: Air Defense Command

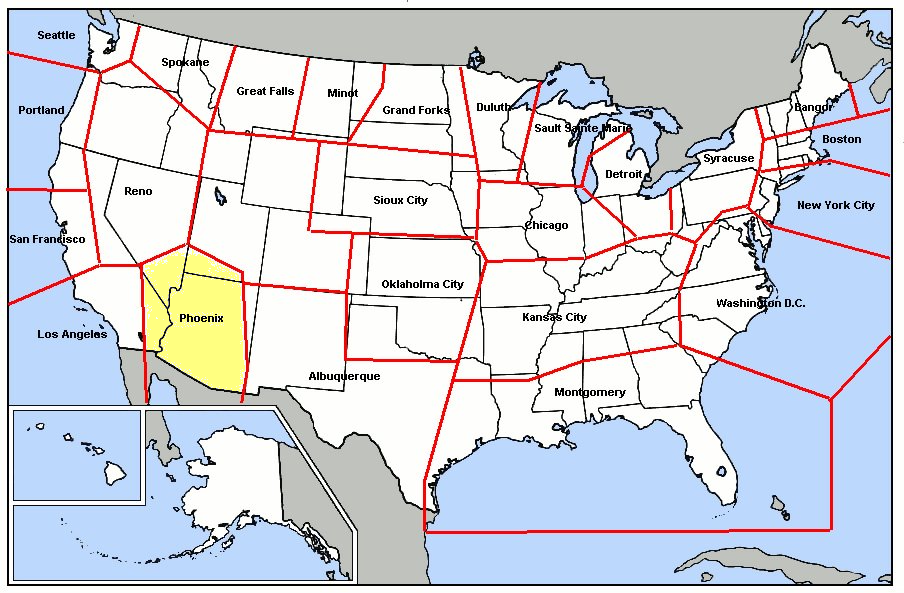
Map of Phoenix ADS

The Phoenix Air Defense Sector (PhADS) is an inactive United States Air Force organization. Its last assignment was with the Air Defense Command 28th Air Division, being stationed at Luke Air Force Base, Arizona. It was inactivated on 1 April 1966

== History ==
PhADS was established in June 1959 assuming control of former ADC Western Air Defense Force units in Arizona; southwestern California; southern Nevada and southwestern Utah. The organization provided command and control over several aircraft and radar squadrons.

On 15 June the new Semi Automatic Ground Environment (SAGE) Direction Center (DC-21) became operational. 33°32′34″N 112°21′27″W DC-21 was equipped with dual AN/FSQ-7 Computers. The day-to-day operations of the command was to train and maintain tactical flying units flying jet interceptor aircraft (F-94 Starfire; F-102 Delta Dagger; F-106 Delta Dart) in a state of readiness with training missions and series of exercises with SAC and other units simulating interceptions of incoming enemy aircraft.

The Sector was inactivated on 1 April 1966 as part of an ADC consolidation and reorganization; then redesignated as 27th Air Division.

=== Lineage ===
- Established as Phoenix Air Defense Sector on 15 June 1959

Inactivated on 1 April 1966

=== Assignments ===
- Western Air Defense Force, 15 June 1959
- 28th Air Division, 1 July 1960 – 1 April 1966

=== Stations ===
- Luke AFB, Arizona, 15 February 1959 – 1 April 1966

=== Components ===
==== Interceptor units ====
- 15th Fighter-Interceptor Squadron

Davis-Monthan AFB, Arizona, 1 May 1961 – 4 December 1964

==== Radar stations ====
- 612th Radar Squadron

Ajo AFS, Arizona, 1 May 1961 – 1 April 1966

- 684th Radar Squadron

Mount Lemmon AFS, Arizona, 1 May 1961 – 1 April 1966

- 864th Aircraft Control and Warning Squadron

Vincent AFS, Arizona, 1 May 1961 – 1 August 1963

- 865th Radar Squadron

Las Vegas AFS, Nevada, 1 May 1961 – 1 April 1966

- 904th Radar Squadron

Winslow AFS, Arizona, 1 May 1961 – 1 August 1963

== See also ==
- List of USAF Aerospace Defense Command General Surveillance Radar Stations
- Aerospace Defense Command Fighter Squadrons
