= Klamath Air Force Station =

Closed United States Air Force General Surveillance Radar station

Klamath Air Force Station
- Part of Air Defense Command (ADC)
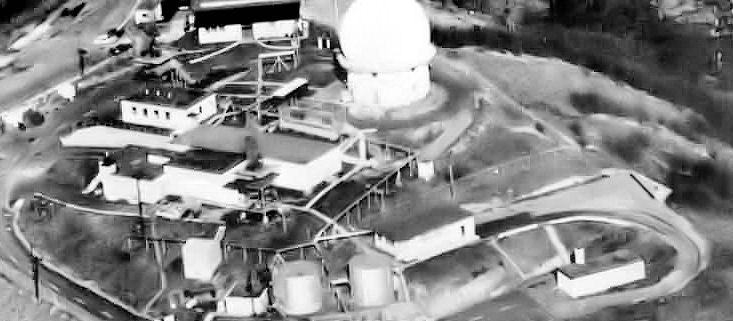
- Klamath Air Force Station 1977

Site information
- Type: Air Force Station
- Controlled by: United States Air Force

Location
- Location of Klamath AFS, California
- Coordinates: 41°33′33″N 124°05′10″W

Site history
- Built: 1951
- In use: 1950–1981

Garrison information
- Garrison: 777th Aircraft Control and Warning Squadron

Klamath Air Force Station (ADC ID: P-33, NORAD ID: Z-33) is a closed United States Air Force General Surveillance Radar station. It is 3.4 miles (5.5 km) northwest of Klamath, California, and was closed in 1981.

== History ==
Klamath Air Force Station was one of twenty-eight stations built as part of the second segment of the Air Defense Command permanent radar network. Prompted by the start of the Korean War, on 11 July 1950, the Secretary of the Air Force asked the Secretary of Defense for approval to quicken construction of the permanent network. Receiving the Defense Secretary's approval on 21 July, the Air Force directed the Corps of Engineers to begin construction adjacent to the town of Requa, California, about 3 miles northwest of the town of Klamath and within sight of the mouth of the Klamath River.

The 777th Aircraft Control and Warning Squadron (AC&W Sq) was activated at the new station on 18 December 1950. The station initially was a "Lashup-Permanent" site (LP-33), operating an AN/TPS-1B radar. It joined the Permanent radar network, and initially the station functioned as a Ground-Control Intercept (GCI) and warning station. As a GCI station, the squadron's role was to guide interceptor aircraft toward unidentified intruders picked up on the unit's radar scopes.

From April 1952, the 777th AC&W Sq operated AN/FPS-3 and AN/FPS-4 radars at the station. An AN/GPS-3 radar was added to it in 1956. The AN/FPS-3 and AN/FPS-4 were replaced by AN/FPS-20 and AN/FPS-6 radars by 1958. During the following year, the station added an AN/FPS-6A height-finder radar, which was later modified to an AN/FPS-90, while the AN/GPS-3 was removed.

During 1960, Klamath AFS joined the Semi Automatic Ground Environment (SAGE) system, feeding data to DC-13 at Adair AFS, Oregon. After joining, the squadron was re-designated as the 777th Radar Squadron (SAGE) on 15 July 1960. The radar squadron provided information 24/7 to the SAGE Direction Center where it was analyzed to determine range, direction altitude speed and whether or not aircraft were friendly or hostile.

By the end of 1961, the AN/FPS-20A long-range search radar had been upgraded and re-designated as an AN/FPS-66. An AN/FPS-26 frequency diversity height-finder radar was added during 1962. On 31 July 1963, the site was re-designated as NORAD ID Z-33. By 1966 there was an AN/FPS-27 long-range search radar in operation there, and the AN/FPS-66 was subsequently retired.

In addition to the main facility, Klamath personnel operated one AN/FPS-14 Gap Filler site:

- Capetown, CA (P-33A) 40°26′41″N 124°23′07″W

Over the years, the equipment at the station was upgraded or modified to improve the efficiency and accuracy of the information gathered by the radars. In 1979, Klamath came under Tactical Air Command (TAC) jurisdiction with the inactivation of Aerospace Defense Command and the creation of ADTAC. The 777th Radar Sq was inactivated on 30 September 1981, and the property was turned over to the National Park Service except for about 2 acres which were given to the Federal Aviation Administration, who continued operations of the AN/FPS-66A search radar in the old AN/FPS-27 tower. FAA operations later ceased as well and the Klamath California radar site coverage volume was taken over by the FAA/USAF joint use site at Rainbow Ridge, CA (J-83A), operating an ARSR-4.

After military use ceased, the site's residential housing area was used by the California Conservation Corps while the remainder of the site (other than the FAA property) became a maintenance facility for Redwood National Park. Following the opening of the park's North Operations Center near Crescent City, California in 2009, the NPS began work to remove nearly all remaining buildings and infrastructure, to return the site to a more natural state. As of 2012, all former Air Force, FAA and NPS facilities had been removed, with only some cellular telecommunications equipment remaining at the site.

== See also ==
- List of United States Air Force aircraft control and warning squadrons
- United States general surveillance radar stations
