= Atolia, California =

Ghost town in San Bernardino County, California

Atolia
- Ghost town
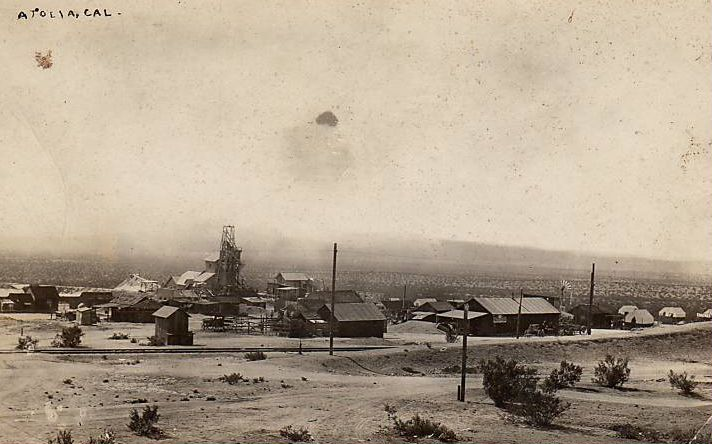
- The Atolia mining operation, c. 1908
- Etymology: portmanteau of "Atkins" and "DeGolia"
- Location in California
- Coordinates: 35°18′53″N 117°36′33″W
- Country: United States
- State: California
- County: San Bernardino County

Atolia is a ghost town in the Mojave Desert near Randsburg, in northwestern San Bernardino County, California.

== History ==
In 1904 and 1905, veins of the tungsten ore scheelite were discovered at a site east of the Randsburg gold mine. Operations at the site were funded in part by Bernard Baruch and operated by the Atkins-Kroll Company, who organized the Atolia Mining Company in 1906.

A weekly newspaper, the Atolia News, began publication in May 1916 under the editorship of Erwin Lehmann.
