= Lompoc Air Force Station =

Lompoc Island Air Force Station
- Part of Air Defense Command (ADC)

Site information
- Type: Air Force Station
- Controlled by: United States Air Force

Location
- Location of Lompoc AFS, California
- Coordinates: 34°33′57″N 120°30′01″W

Site history
- Built: 1963
- In use: 1963-1968

Garrison information
- Garrison: 669th Aircraft Control and Warning Squadron

Santa Rosa Island Air Force Station (ADC ID: RP-15, NORAD ID: Z-15) is a closed United States Air Force General Surveillance Radar station. It is 5.6 miles (9.0 km) south-southwest of Lompoc, California. It was closed in 1968 by the Air Force, and turned over to the Federal Aviation Administration (FAA).

Today the site is part of the Joint Surveillance System (JSS), designated by NORAD as Western Air Defense Sector (WADS) Ground Equipment Facility G-35. It is also partially used by Air Force Space Command at Vandenberg AFB as a telemetry receiving station.

== History ==
Lompoc Air Force Station was established to replace Santa Rosa Island AFS due to the high cost of operating the offshore station. It was given the designation "RP-15" upon its activation on 1 April 1963. Actual construction of the Lompoc AFS began on 1 November 1961 with an expected completion date of 1 September 1962, and an Operational date of 1 July 1963.

This new station was planned to be a Long Range Radar Site with a GATR facility. It was programmed to be a split site with the headquarters of the 669th Aircraft Control and Warning Squadron and dormitories located on Oak Mountain, about 18 miles south of Vandenberg AFB. The site was activated on 23 June 1962 during the construction period, and other squadron personnel were assigned during the months prior to its formal establishment. Rain damage and other construction problems slowed construction and final acceptance of the site was made in January 1963, and initially the station functioned as a Ground-Control Intercept (GCI) and warning station. As a GCI station, the squadron's role was to guide interceptor aircraft toward unidentified intruders picked up on the unit's radar scopes.

In the early part of 1963, Lompoc AFS was given the added responsibility of having a limited GCI capability in the DMCC room. In addition, the Operational date was moved ahead 3 months to 1 April 1963. Through great teamwork and long hours of duty by members of Western GEEIA, Western Electric, Burroughs and squadron personnel, equipment was installed, aligned and tested and this squadron proudly met its operational date of 1 April 1963.

Upon its activation, Lompoc AFS joined Semi Automatic Ground Environment (SAGE) system, feeding data to DC-17 at Norton AFB, California. With the move of the attending 669th AC&W Squadron from Santa Rosa AFS, the squadron was re-designated as the 669th Radar Squadron (SAGE). Lompoc's radars provided a complete circle of coverage several hundred miles in radius. Lompoc AFS initially hosted an AN/FPS-67 search radar and an AN/FPS-6A height-finder radar.

The Ground Air Transmitting Receiving (GATR) Site (R-22) for communications was located at 34°33′07″N 120°30′08″W, approximately 1 mile South from the main site. Normally the GATR site was connected by a pair of buried telephone cables, with a backup connection of dual telephone cables overhead. The Coordinate Data Transmitting Set (CDTS) (AN/FST-2) at the main site converted each radar return into a digital word which was transmitted by the GATR via microwave to the Control Center.

The radar squadron provided information 24/7 the SAGE Direction Center where it was analyzed to determine range, direction altitude speed and whether or not aircraft were friendly or hostile. Lompoc AFS was re-designated as NORAD ID Z-15 on 31 July 1963.

A second AN/FPS-6 was added in 1964. The 669th was inactivated in June 1968 due to budget reductions and the draw down of the ADC aircraft radar squadrons. However, the Lompoc GATR site (R-22) has been retained, and is now site # G-35. The site also is used as a telemetry site for the Western Test Range at Vandenberg AFB.

== See also ==
- List of USAF Aerospace Defense Command General Surveillance Radar Stations
