= Southwest Air Defense Sector =

Inactive US Air Force organization

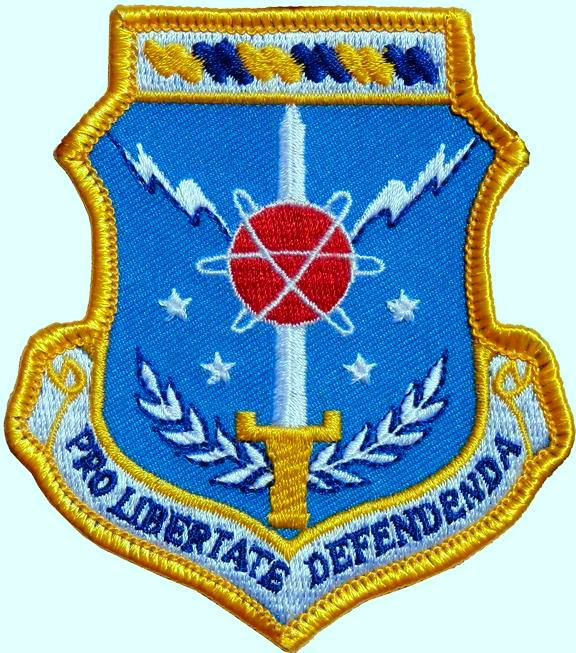
- Emblem of the Southwest Air Defense Sector
- Active: 1987–1994
- Country: United States
- Branch: United States Air Force
- Role: Air Defense

The Southwest Air Defense Sector (SWADS) is an inactive United States Air Force organization. Its last assignment was with the First Air Force, being stationed at March Air Force Base, California. It was inactivated on 31 December 1994.

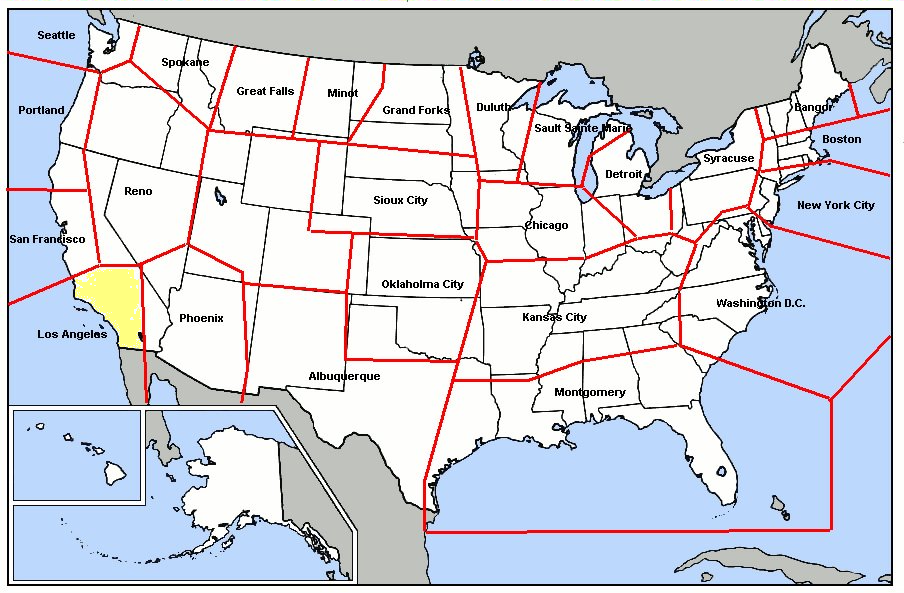
Historical map of Los Angeles Air Defense Sector, 1959–1966

== Los Angeles Air Defense Sector ==
The Los Angeles Air Defense Sector (SAGE) (LAADS) was designated by Air Defense Command in February 1959 while NORAD's 25 July 1958, SAGE Geographic Reorganization Plan was being implemented. Assuming control of former ADC Western Air Defense Force units, the sector's region consisted of ADC atmospheric forces (fighter-interceptor and radar units) located in southern California north to Santa Barbara and the southern Central Valley. The Manual Air Direction Center (MDC) was at Norton AFB, California, until the Air Defense Direction Center (DC-17) was completed in 1959 for the Semi Automatic Ground Environment.

On 1 April 1966, LAADS was inactivated, as did the other 22 sectors in the country. Most of its assets were assumed by the 27th Air Division.

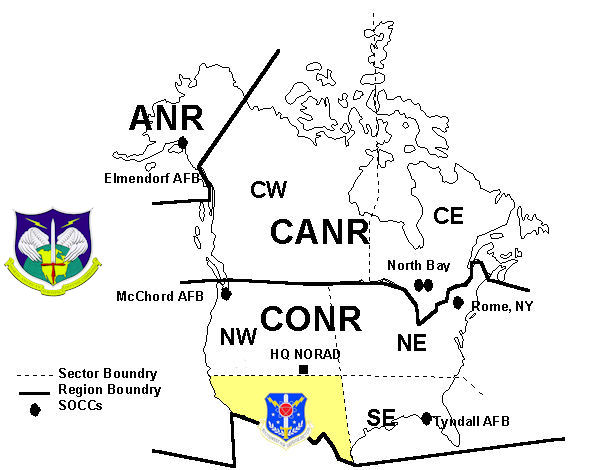
SWADS Region shown in NORAD Region/Sector Configuration, 1987–2005

Reactivated as the Southwest Air Defense Sector (SWADS) on 1 July 1987 at March AFB, California, in the 26th Air Division; the sector received the 26th AD assets when it became inactive on 30 September 1990. SWADS was responsible for the atmospheric defense of approximately one-fourth of the Continental United States. Its eastern border was at the intersection of the 36th parallel north and 97th meridian west south to the Gulf of Mexico at the 28th parallel north. Its region extended west to include the region south of the 36th parallel north to the Pacific Ocean at the 122nd meridian west. It came under the Continental NORAD Region (CONR) Headquarters at Tyndall AFB, Florida. The Joint Surveillance System Sector Operations Control Center (SOCC) was at March AFB and Air Route Surveillance Radar (ARSR) data from several JSS radar stations and tethered aerostat radar balloons (e.g., Ground Equipment Facility J-31 near Los Angeles).

On 1 January 1995, the SWADS consolidated with the Northwest Air Defense Sector, headquartered at McChord AFB, Washington and the combined command was designated as the Western Air Defense Sector (WADS).

== Units ==
Air National Guard units aligned under 1AF (AFNORTH) formerly with an air defense mission under SWADS were:

- 144th Fighter Wing (F-16), California ANG, Fresno ANGB, California
- 150th Fighter Wing (F-16), New Mexico ANG, Kirtland AFB, New Mexico
- 138th Fighter Wing (F-16), Oklahoma ANG, Tulsa, Oklahoma
- 149th Fighter Wing (F-16), Texas ANG, Lackland AFB, Texas

=== Lineage ===
- Established as Los Angeles Air Defense Sector on 1 February 1959 by redesignation of 27th Air Division

Inactivated on 1 April 1966; redesignated as 27th Air Division

- Redesignated as Southwest Air Defense Sector (SWADS) callsign Sierra Pete and activated, 1 July 1987

Inactivated on 31 December 1994, assets reassigned to Northwest Air Defense Sector

=== Assignments ===
- 28th Air Division, 1 October 1959 – 1 April 1966
- 26th Air Division, 1 July 1987
- First Air Force, 1 October 1990 – 31 December 1994

=== Stations ===
- Norton AFB, California, 1 October 1959 – 1 April 1966
- March AFB, California, 1 July 1987 – 30 September 1990

=== Components ===
==== Group ====
- 414th Fighter Group (Air Defense)

Oxnard AFB, California, 1 October 1959 – 1 April 1966

==== Interceptor squadrons ====
- 15th Fighter-Interceptor Squadron

Davis-Monthan AFB, Arizona, 1 January 1960 – 1 May 1961

- 329th Fighter-Interceptor Squadron

George AFB, California, 1 October 1959 – 1 April 1966

- 456th Fighter-Interceptor Squadron

Castle AFB, California, 1 August 1963 – 1 April 1966

==== Radar squadrons ====
- 612th Aircraft Control and Warning Squadron

Ajo AFS, Arizona, 1 January 1960 – 1 May 1961

- 669th Aircraft Control and Warning Squadron

Santa Rosa Island AFS, California, 1 October 1959
Lompoc AFS, California, 1 April 1963 – 1 April 1966

- 682nd Aircraft Control and Warning Squadron

Almaden AFS, California, 1 August 1963

- 774th Aircraft Control and Warning Squadron

Madera AFS, California, 1 August 1963 – 1 April 1966

- 864th Aircraft Control and Warning Squadron

Vincent AFB, Arizona, 1 October 1959 – 1 May 1961

== See also ==
- Eastern Air Defense Sector
- List of MAJCOM wings of the United States Air Force
- List of United States Air Force Aerospace Defense Command Interceptor Squadrons
- Southeast Air Defense Sector
- United States general surveillance radar stations
- Western Air Defense Sector
