= List of United States Air Force Aerospace Defense Command Interceptor Squadrons =

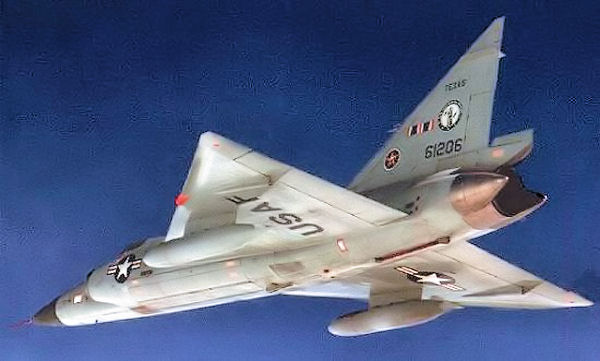
Convair F-102A-65-CO Delta Dagger Serial 56-1206 of the 111th Fighter Interceptor Squadron of the Texas Air National Guard, Ellington AFB.

The second iteration of Aerospace Defense Command (ADC) was established on 21 March 1946 as a component of the United States Army Air Forces, with the mission of planning for and executing the air defense of the United States. Air Defense Command (as it was known until 1968), was headquartered at Mitchel Army Airfield, New York.

== Types ==
The growth and development of the ADC air defense system grew steadily throughout the Cold War era. Interceptors used by Air/Aerospace Defense Command were:

- Republic F-47D/N Thunderbolt
- North American F-51D/H Mustang
- Northrop F-61C Black Widow
  With the end of World War II, large numbers of wartime pistoned-engined fighters were allocated for air defense mission. The long range P-47N/P-51H models, developed for the invasion of Japan, were especially well-suited for the air defense role and were used into the mid-1950s by Air National Guard units. Generally P-47s were based east of the Mississippi River, while P-51s were stationed to the west. The twin-engined P-61 night fighter was the first American aircraft specifically designed from the outset for the night fighting role, and with its long range was also well-suited for air defense. On June 11, 1948, the newly formed United States Air Force eliminated the P-for-pursuit category and replaced it with F-for-fighter.
- North American F-82F/G Twin Mustang
  In 1948, the F and G night-fighter versions of the Twin Mustang were placed in service with the Air Defense Command. They were painted all-black and had flame-damped exhausts and replaced the F-61 Black Widow by 1949. It was anticipated that the service life of the Twin Mustang would be relatively brief, since the F-82 was seen as only an interim type, filling in the gap only until adequate numbers of jet fighters could be made available. In 1950, some units based in the United States were already beginning to replace their Twin Mustangs with jets.
- Lockheed F-80 Shooting Star
  In 1948, F-80Cs began to reach operational ADC units, the first being the 57th Interceptor Group (64th, 65th, and 66th Squadrons) based in Alaska. However, during the Korean War the introduction of the MiG-15 into Korean combat On November 1, 1950, proved to be a nasty surprise. It was soon apparent that the F-80C was no match for the swept-wing MiG-15, being almost 100 mph slower than its Russian-built opponent. F-80s were withdrawn from Korea and served in ADC units for a few years before being sent to Air Force Reserve squadrons where they were flown until the late 1950s.
- Lockheed F-94 Starfire
  Between 1950 and 1953, the F-94 played a vital role in the defense of the continental United States from attack by nuclear-armed Soviet Tu 4 bombers. It was the only jet-powered all-weather interceptor available in quantity at that time, and filled in a vital gap until more advanced equipment could be provided.
- Republic F-84 Thunderjet
  Versions of the F-84 were used by ADC groups in the early 1950s, however during the Korean War it was found that the straight-winged F-84E was much too slow to match the swept-wing Soviet MiG-15. The total air-to-air score ended up as nine MiGs downed as opposed to 18 Thunderjets lost, which gave the Thunderjet a 2 to 1 inferiority against the MiG-15.
- Northrop F-89 Scorpion
  The Northrop F-89 Scorpion was one of the primary defenders of North American airspace during the Cold War. Production was authorized in January 1949, with the first production F-89A entering USAF service in September 1950. The final production model, the F-89H served with the ADC through 1959 and with the Air National Guard through 1969.
- North American F-86A/E/F/H Sabre
  The Sabrejet started to reach ADC units during the Korean War as the A models were replaced with E and F versions. Later, as the North American F-100 Super Sabre was introduced, TAC units sent their advanced Sabres to ADC to fly air defense missions.
- North American F-86D/L Sabre
  The F-86D was the interceptor version of the F-86 Sabre air superiority fighter. The F-86D was originally designated as the F-95A, however for political reasons the designation of the F-95 was changed to F-86D on July 24, 1950. The F-86D entered ADC service in 1953 however it only saw active ADC service for a few years. The phaseout of the F-86D from the ADC began in August 1956, and was essentially complete by April 1958. As ADC F-86Ds were phased out, some of them were turned over to the Air National Guard. Many of the ANG's F-86Ds were quickly supplanted by F-86Ls, and by June 1961, the F-86D no longer appeared on either the USAF or ANG rolls. The F-86L was the designation given to late-1950s conversions of existing USAF F-86Ds to use the Semi-Automatic Ground Environment (SAGE) datalink system. During the Cuban Missile Crisis of 1962, six ANG F-86L squadrons were on alert. The last F-86Ls were withdrawn from ANG service during the summer of 1965.
- Convair F-102 Delta Dagger
  The single-seat F-102 was ADC's first supersonic interceptor that could exceed Mach 1 in level flight with area ruling and internally carried Falcon and Genie missiles. It soon became the backbone of the United States air defenses beginning with its introduction in 1956, replacing subsonic types. F-102s served in large numbers with both Air Force and Air National Guard units well into the 1970s. George W. Bush, later President of the United States, flew the F-102 as part of his Air National Guard service in the late 1960s and early 1970s. In the mid-1970s, F-102s began to be converted to QF-102 drones under the Full Scale Aerial Target (FSAT) program.
- Lockheed F-104A Starfighter
  By 1958, delays in the delivery and development of the Convair F-106A Delta Dart Mach 2+ fighter-interceptor for ADC Command had at that time become worrisome, and the USAF decided to go ahead and accept the F-104As originally destined for the TAC and assign them to the ADC as a stopgap measure. The selection of the F-104A for the ADC was sort of curious, since it had not been originally designed as an interceptor and it lacked an adequate endurance and had no all-weather capability. However, its high climb rate made it attractive to the ADC and it was hoped that the Starfighter could fill in until the F-106 became available. The F-104A was not very well suited for service as an interceptor. Its low range was a problem for North American air defense, and its lack of all-weather capability made it incapable of operating in conjunction with the SAGE (Semi-Automatic Ground Environment) system. Most F-104As were replaced by the end of 1960, however the 319th Fighter-Interceptor Squadron at Homestead AFB Florida retained their F-104As until the unit was inactivated in 1969. The last USAF F-104 aircraft remained in service with the Puerto Rico Air National Guard until 1975.
- McDonnell F-101B/F Voodoo
  With the relative failure of the F-104A in the interceptor role, ADC units were re-equipped with the F-101B Voodoo. The F-101Bs were modified versions of the SAC F-101A nuclear attack aircraft (designed for one-way missions carrying tactical nuclear weapons) by modifying the avionics systems and fire control systems for air-to-air missiles. The last F-101Bs were delivered in March 1961, and once the teething troubles with its fire control system issues were corrected, the F-101B proved to be a quite successful interceptor. Along with the F-101Bs, The dual-seat F-101F trainer was also flown. F-101Fs were equipped with dual controls, but carried the same armament as the F-101B and were fully combat-capable. The F-101 was operated by both Regular Air Force and Air National Guard ADC units.
- Convair F-106A Delta Dart
  The Convair F-106A Delta Dart was considered by many as being the finest all-weather interceptor ever built. It was the primary air defense interceptor aircraft for the US Air Force from the 1960s through the early 1980s. It was also the last dedicated interceptor in U.S. Air Force service to date. It was gradually retired during the 1980s, though the QF-106 drone conversions of the aircraft were used until 1998 as aerial targets under the FSAT program.

== Squadrons ==
During the 30-plus years of its existence the Air/Aerospace Defense Command underwent many changes. This is a list of the active fighter interceptor squadrons assigned to the command as its alert force. Not listed are 76 Air National Guard Squadrons, several Naval Squadrons, radar squadrons, training squadrons and support units. ADC squadrons were very mobile, and were transferred, redesignated and inactivated/reactivated frequently.

=== 2d through 49th Fighter-Interceptor Squadrons ===
- 2d Fighter-Interceptor Squadron (1947–1969, 1971–1973, 1974–1979)

Mitchel AFB NY (1947-1949) (P/F-61, F-82)
McGuire AFB NJ (1949-1955) (F-86, F-94)
Suffolk County AFB NY (1955-1969) (F-94, F-101, F-102)
Wurtsmith AFB MI (1971-1973) (F-106)
Tyndall AFB FL (1974-1979) (as 2d FITS) (F-106)

- 5th Fighter-Interceptor Squadron (1947–1979)

Mitchel AFB NY (1947-1949) (P-61, P-82)
McGuire AFB NJ (1949-1955) (F-86, F-94)
Suffolk County AFB NY (1955-1960) (F-86D, F-102)
Minot AFB, ND (1960-1979) (F-106)

- 11th Fighter-Interceptor Squadron (1952–1968)

Duluth IAP MN (F-51, F-86D, F-89H/J, F-102, F-106)
Inactivated and Redesignated: 87th Fighter-Interceptor Squadron (1968-1979)
Reactivated at: Duluth IAP MN (F-106)

- 13th Fighter-Interceptor Squadron (1953–1968)

Selfridge AFB MI (1953-1955) (F-86D)
Sioux City AP IA (1955-1959) (F-86D/L)
Glasgow AFB MT (1959-1968) (F-101B)

- 14th Fighter-Interceptor Squadron (1953–1960)

Sioux City AP IA (F-86D/L)

- 15th Fighter-Interceptor Squadron (1953–1964)

Davis-Monthan AFB AZ (F-86D/L, F-89J, F-101B)

- 18th Fighter-Interceptor Squadron (1952–1971)

Minneapolis-St Paul APT MN (1952-1953)(F-51D, F-86A/F, F-89D)
Wurtsmith AFB MI (1953-1960) (F-102)
Grand Forks AFB ND (1960-1971) (F-101B)

- 27th Fighter-Interceptor Squadron (1950–1971)

March AFB CA (1950) (F-86A)
Griffiss AFB NY (1950-1959) (F-86A, F-89C, F-94C, F-102)
Loring AFB ME (1959-1971) (F-106)

- 29th Fighter-Interceptor Squadron (1953–1968)

Great Falls/Malmstrom AFB MT (F-94C, F-101B)

- 31st Fighter-Interceptor Squadron (1953–1957)

Larson AFB WA (1953-1956) (F-86D)
Wurtsmith AFB MI (1956-1957) (F-102)

- 37th Fighter-Interceptor Squadron (1946–1949, 1952–1960)

Dow AAF/AFB ME (1946-1949) (P-47D, P/F-84B)
Burlington APT/Ethan Allen AFB VT (1952-1960) (F-51D, F-86D, F-102)

- 42d Fighter-Interceptor Squadron (1953–1958)

O'Hare APT IL (1953-1955) (F-86D)
Pittsburgh APT PA (1955-1958) (F-86L)

- 45th Fighter-Interceptor Squadron (1952–1953)

Suffolk County AFB NY (F-47N, F-86D)

- 46th Fighter-Interceptor Squadron (1952–1958)

Dover AFB DE (F-94C)

- 47th Fighter-Interceptor Squadron (1952–1960)

Niagara Falls APT NY (F-47D/N, F-86F/D/L, F-102)

- 48th Fighter-Interceptor Squadron (1946–1949, 1952–1991)

Dow AAF/AFB ME (1946-1949) (P-47N, P/F-84B)
Grenier AFB NH (1952-1953) (F-47D/N)
Langley AFB VA (1953-1991) (F-84G, F-94C, F-102, F-106, F-15)

- 49th Fighter-Interceptor Squadron (1946–1949, 1952–1979)

Dow AAF/AFB ME (1946-1949) (P-47D/N, P/F-84B)
Dow AFB ME (1952-1956) (F-86F/D)
Hanscom AFB MA (1956-1959) (F-86L)
Inactivated and Redesignated: 465th Fighter-Interceptor Squadron
Reactivated at: Hanscom AFB MA (1959-1960) (F-86L)
Inactivated and Redesignated: 49th Fighter-Interceptor Squadron
Reactivated at: Griffiss AFB NY (1968-1979) (F-106)

=== 54th through 98th Fighter-Interceptor Squadrons ===
- 54th Fighter-Interceptor Squadron (1953–1960)

Rapid City/Ellsworth AFB SD (F-51D, F-86G/D, F-89)

- 56th Fighter-Interceptor Squadron (1952–1960)

Selfridge AFB MI (1952-1955) (F-86F/D)
Wright-Patterson AFB OH (1955-1960) (F-86D/L, F-104A/B)

- 57th Fighter-Interceptor Squadron (1953–2006)

Presque Isle AFB ME (1953-1954) (F-89C)
Keflavik APT Iceland (1954-2006) (F-89, F-102, F-4C/E, F-15A/D)

- 58th Fighter-Interceptor Squadron (1948–1960)

Otis AFB MA (1948-1959) (F-84B, F-86A, F-94B, F-89D/H/J)
Walker AFB NM (1959-1960) (F-89J)

- 59th Fighter-Interceptor Squadron (1948–1968, 1968–1969)

Otis AFB MA (1948-1952) (F-84B, F-86A, F-94A/B)
Goose AFB Labrador Canada (1952-1967) (F-89D/J, F-102)
Bergstrom AFB TX (1967-1968) (F-102)
322d Fighter-Interceptor Squadron Redesignated as 59th FIS
Kingsley Field OR (1968-1969) (F-101B)

- 60th Fighter-Interceptor Squadron (1948–1971)

Otis AFB MA (1948-1950) (F-84B)
Westover AFB MA (1950-1955) (F-86A/E/D)
Otis AFB MA (1955-1971) (F-94C, F-101B)

- 61st Fighter-Interceptor Squadron (1948–1960)

Selfridge AFB MI (1948-1953) (F-80, F-86A, F-94B)
Ernest Harmon Air Base, Newfoundland Canada (1953-1957) (F-89D)
Truax Field WI (1957-1960) (F-102)

- 62d Fighter-Interceptor Squadron (1948–1971)

Selfridge AFB MI (1948-1950) (F-80, F-86A)
O'Hare APT IL (1950-1959) (F-86A/D/L)
K.I. Sawyer AFB MI (1959-1971 (F-101B)

- 63d Fighter-Interceptor Squadron (1948–1958)

Selfridge AFB MI (1948-1951) (F-80, F-86A)
Oscoda/Wurtsmith AFB MI (1951-1955) (F-86A/F/D)
Inactivated Name Transferred
O'Hare APT IL (1955-1958) (F-86D/L)

- 64th Fighter-Interceptor Squadron (1957–1966)

McChord AFB WA (1957-1960) (F-102)
Paine Field WA (1960-1966) (F-102)

- 65th Fighter-Interceptor Squadron (1957–1958)

Richards-Gebaur AFB MO (Not Equipped)

- 66th Fighter-Interceptor Squadron (1957–1958)

Oxnard AFB CA (Not Equipped)

- 71st Fighter-Interceptor Squadron (1948–1971)

March AFB CA (1948-1950) (F-86A)
George AFB CA, Griffiss AFB NY) (1950) (F-86A)
Pittsburgh APT PA (1950-1953) (F-86A/D)
Inactivated Designation Transferred
Selfridge AFB MI (1953-1967) (F-86D/L, F-102, F-106)
Richards-Gebaur AFB (1967-1968) (F-106)
Malmstrom AFB MT (1968-1971) (F-106)

- 74th Fighter-Interceptor Squadron (1951–1958)

Presque Isle AFB ME (1951-1953) (F-86A/E, F-89C, F-94B)
Thule AB, Greenland (1953-1958) (F-89B/D)

- 75th Fighter-Interceptor Squadron (1951–1969)

Presque Isle AFB ME (1951-1952) (F-86A/E)
Suffolk County AFB NY (1952-1955) (F-86E/D)
Inactivated Designation Transferred
Presque Isle AFB ME (1955-1959) (F-89D/H)
Dow AFB ME (1959-1968) (F-101B)
Inactivated then Reactivated
Wurtsmith AFB MI (1968-1969) (F-101B/F)

- 76th Fighter-Interceptor Squadron (1955–1963)

Presque Isle AFB ME (1955-1957) (F-89D)
Pinecastle/McCoy AFB FL (1957-1961) (F-89H/J)
Westover AFB MA (1961-1963) (F-89J, F-102)

- 82d Fighter-Interceptor Squadron (1947–1966)

Mitchel AFB NY (1947-1948) (Not Equipped)
Hamilton AFB CA (1948-1952) (F-51D, F-84B/D)
Larson AFB WA (1952-1953) (F-94B)
Keflavik APT Iceland (1953-1954) (F-94B)
Presque Isle AFB ME (1954-1955) (F-94B)
Inactivated then Designation Transferred
Travis AFB CA (1955-1966) (F-86D, F-102)

- 83d Fighter-Interceptor Squadron (1947–1979)

Mitchel AFB NY (1947-1948) (Not Equipped)
Hamilton AFB CA (1948-1969) (F-51D, F-84B/D, F-89A/B, F-86F, F-94B/C, F-89D/H/J, F-104A, F-101B/F)
Loring AFB CA (1971-1972) (F-106)
Castle AFB CA (1969-1979) (F-106)

- 84th Fighter-Interceptor Squadron (1947–1979)

Mitchel AFB NY (1947-1948) (Not Equipped)
Hamilton AFB CA (1948-1969) (F-51D, F-84B/D, F-89A/B, F-86F, F-94B/C, F-89D/H/J, F-101B/F, F-106)
Castle AFB CA (1969-1979) (F-106)

- 85th Fighter-Interceptor Squadron (1952–1959)

Scott AFB IL (F-51D/H, F-86D/L)

- 86th Fighter-Interceptor Squadron (1952–1960)

Youngstown APT OH (F-84C, F-102)

- 87th Fighter-Interceptor Squadron (1952–1954, 1956–1979)

Sioux City AP IA (1952-1954) (F-84C, F-102)
Lockbourne AFB (1956-1968) (F-86D, F-102, F-101B)
Inactivated. 11th FIS Replaced by 87th FIS
Duluth APT MN (1968-1971) (F-106)
K.I. Sawyer AFB MI (F-106)

- 91st Fighter-Interceptor Squadron (1949–1951)

Kirtland AFB NM (F-80, F-86A)

- 92d Fighter-Interceptor Squadron (1949–1951)

Kirtland AFB NM (F-80, F-86A)

- 93d Fighter-Interceptor Squadron (1949–1960)

Kirtland AFB NM (F-80, F-86A/L)

- 94th Fighter-Interceptor Squadron (1948–1969)

March AFB CA (1948-1950) (F-80, F-86A)
George AFB CA (1950-1955) (F-86A/D)
Selfridge AFB MI (1955-1969) (F-86D/L, F-106)

- 95th Fighter-Interceptor Squadron (1949, 1952–1979)

Grenier AFB NH (1949) (F-51D/H)
Andrews AFB MD (1952-1963) (F-94B, F-86D/L, F-102, F-106)
Dover AFB DE (1963-1973) (F-106)
Tyndall AFB FL (1973-1979) (As 95th FITS) (F-106)

- 96th Fighter-Interceptor Squadron (1947–1957)

Grenier AFB NH (1947-1949)(F-51D)
Wright-Patterson AFB OH (1950-1955) (F-86A/E/D)
New Castle APT DE (1955-1957) (F-94C)

- 97th Fighter-Interceptor Squadron (1949, 1950–1957)

Grenier AFB NH (1949) (F-51D)
Wright-Patterson AFB OH (1950-1955) (F-86E/D)
New Castle APT DE (1955-1957) (F-94C)

- 98th Fighter-Interceptor Squadron (1956–1968)

Dover AFB DE (1956-1963) (F-89D/H/J, F-101B)
Suffolk County AFB NY (1963-1968) (F-101B)

=== 317th through 438th Fighter-Interceptor Squadrons ===
- 317th Fighter-Interceptor Squadron (1947–1957)

McChord AAF WA (1947) (P-61)
Hamilton AAF CA (1948) (F-82)
Moses Lake AFB WA (1948-1950) (F-82)
McChord AFB WA (1950-1957) (F-94A, F-102)

- 318th Fighter-Interceptor Squadron (1947–1979)

Mitchel AFB NY (1947) (Not Equipped)
Hamilton AFB CA (1947-1948) (F-82)
McChord AFB WA (1948-1953) (F-94A)
Thule AB Greenland (1953-1954) (F-94A)
Presque Isle AFB ME (1954-1955) (F-94C)
McChord AFB WA (1955-1979) (F-86D, F-102, F-106)

- 319th Fighter-Interceptor Squadron (1949–1952, 1955–1969, 1971–1972)

McChord AFB WA (1949-1952) (F-82)
Reassigned to Suwon Air Base, South Korea (Far East Air Force (1952-1955)
Bunker Hill AFB IN (1955-1959) (F-94C/J F-106)
Westover AFB MA (1959-1963) (F-104A/B)
Homestead AFB FL (1963-1969) (F-104A/B)
Malmstrom AFB MT (1971-1972) (F-106)

- 321st Fighter-Interceptor Squadron (1955–1960)

Paine AFB WA (F-89D/H/J)

- 322d Fighter-Interceptor Squadron (1955–1968)

Larson AFB WA (1955-1959) (F-86D)
Kingsley Field OR (1959-1968) (F-101B)

- 323d Fighter-Interceptor Squadron (1952–1960)

Larson AFB WA (1952-1955) (F-86D)
Designation Transferred
Truax Field WI (1955-1957) (F-102)
Harmon AFB Newfoundland (1957-1960) (F-102)

- 324th Fighter-Interceptor Squadron (1955–1958)

Westover AFB MA (F-86D/L)

- 325th Fighter-Interceptor Squadron (1953–1966)

Travis AFB CA (1953-1954) (F-86E)
Hamilton AFB CA (1954-1955) (F-86D)
Designation Transferred
Truax Field WI (1955-1966) (F-102)

- 326th Fighter-Interceptor Squadron (1953–1967)

Fairfax Airport KS (1953-1954) (Not Equipped)
Grandview/Richards-Gebaur AFB MO (1954-1967) (F-86D, F-102)

- 327th Fighter-Interceptor Squadron (1955–1960)

George AFB CA (1955-1958) (F-86D, F-102)
Thule AB Greenland (1958-1960) (F-102)

- 329th Fighter-Interceptor Squadron (1955–1967)

George AFB CA (F-86D/L, F-102, F-106)

- 330th Fighter-Interceptor Squadron (1952–1959)

Stewart AFB NY (F-80, F-86A/F/D/L)

- 331st Fighter-Interceptor Squadron (1953–1969)

Suffolk County AFB NY (1953-1955) (F-51D, F-86D)
Stewart AFB NY (1955-1958) (F-86D/L)
Webb AFB TX (1958-1967) (F-86L, F-102, F-104A)

- 332d Fighter-Interceptor Squadron (1953–1965)

New Castle APT DE (1953-1955) (F-94C)
McGuire AFB NJ (1955-1959) (F-86D/L, F-102)
England AFB LA (1959-1960) (F-102)
Thule AB Greenland (1960-1965) (F-102)

- 334th Fighter-Interceptor Squadron (1948–1950)

Langley AFBVA (1948-1950) (F-80, F-86A)
New Castle APT DE (1950) (F-86A)

- 335th Fighter-Interceptor Squadron (1948–1950)

Andrews AFB MD (1948-1949) (F-80)
Langley AFB VA (1949-1950) (F-80, F-86A)
Andrews AFB MD (1950) (F-86A)

- 336th Fighter-Interceptor Squadron (1948–1950))

Andrews AFB MD (1948-1949) (F-80)
Langley AFB VA (1949-1950) (F-80, F-86A)
Andrews AFB MD (1950) (F-86A)

- 337th Fighter-Interceptor Squadron (1954–1960)

Minneapolis-St Paul APT (1954-1955) (F-89D)
Westover AFB MA (1955-1960) (F-86D/L)

- 354th Fighter-Interceptor Squadron (1952–1958)

Long Beach APT CA (1952) (F-51D)
Oxnard AFB CA (1952-1955) (F-51D, F-94C)
'Designation Transferred
McGhee Tyson AFB TN (1955-1958) (F-86D/L)

- 357th Fighter-Interceptor Squadron (1952–1953)

Portland IAP OR (F-86F)

- 398th Fighter-Interceptor Squadron (1956–1957)

Hamilton AFB CA (Not Equipped)

- 413th Fighter-Interceptor Squadron (1954–1955)

Travis AFB CA (F-86D)

- 414th Night-Fighter Squadron (1946)

March AFB CA (Not Equipped)

- 425th Night-Fighter Squadron (1946–1947)

March AFB CA (1946) (Not Equipped)
McChord AAF WA (1946-1947) (P-61)

- 431st Fighter-Interceptor Squadron (1952–1953)

Selfridge AFB MI (F-51D, F-86F)

- 432d Fighter-Interceptor Squadron (1952–1958)

Truax Field WI (1952-1955) (F-86F/D)
Designation Transferred
Minneapolis-St Paul APT (1955-1958) (F-86D, F-89H)

- 433d Fighter-Interceptor Squadron (1952–1954, 1955–1957)

Truax Field WI (1952-1954) (F-89C, F-94B)
Minot AFB ND (1955-1957) (Not Equipped)

- 437th Fighter-Interceptor Squadron (1952–1968, 1968)

Otis AFB MA (1952-1956) (F-94C)
Designation Transferred
Oxnard AFB CA (1956-1968) (F-89D/H/J, F-101B)
Inactivated - 456th FIS Reactivated/Replaced by 437th FIS
Oxnard AFB CA (1968) (F-106)

- 438th Fighter-Interceptor Squadron (1953–1968)

Kinross/Kincheloe AFB MI (1953-1968) (F-94B, F-89D, F-102, F-106)
Redesignated 49th FIS
Griffiss AFB NY (1968) (F-106)

=== 440th through 539th Fighter-Interceptor Squadrons ===
- 440th Fighter-Interceptor Squadron (1953–1954)

Geiger Field WA (F-86D)

- 444th Fighter-Interceptor Squadron (1954–1968)

Charleston AFB SC (F-86D/L, F-101B)

- 445th Fighter-Interceptor Squadron (1953–1968)

Geiger Field WA (1953-1955) (F-86D)
Designation Transferred
Wurtsmith AFB NH (1955-1968) (F-89H/J, F-101B)

- 456th Fighter-Interceptor Squadron (1954–1968)

Truax Field WI (1954-1955) (F-86D)
Inactivated/Reactivated
Castle AFB CA (1955-1968) (F-86D, F-102, F-106)
Redesignated 437th FIS and Transferred to Oxnard AFB CA

- 460th Fighter-Interceptor Squadron (1954–1966, 1968–1974)

McGhee Tyson Airport TN (1954-1955) (F-86D)
Designation Transferred
Portland IAP OR (1955-1966) (F-89D, F-102)
Inactivated/Reactivated
Oxnard AFB CA (1968-1969) (F-106)
Kingsley Field OR (1969-1971) (F-106)
Grand Forks AFB ND (1971-1974) (F-106)

- 465th Fighter-Interceptor Squadron (1953–1960)

McChord AFB WA (1953-1955) (F-86D)
Griffiss AFB NY (1955-1959) (F-89D/H)
Hanscom AFB MA (1959-1960) (F-86L)

- 469th Fighter-Interceptor Squadron (1952–1957)

McGhee Tyson Airport TN (1952-1957) (F-47D/N, F-86D)

- 482d Fighter-Interceptor Squadron (1956–1965)

Seymour-Johnson AFB NC (F-102)
Homestead AFB FL (1965-1969) (F-104A/B)

- 484th Fighter-Interceptor Squadron (1956–1959)

K. I. Sawyer AFB MI (Not Equipped)

- 496th Fighter-Interceptor Squadron (1953–1954)

Hamilton AFB CA (F-51D, F-86)

- 497th Fighter-Interceptor Squadron (1953–1958)

Portland IAP OR (1953-1955) (F-94D, F-89A)
Designation Transferred
Geiger Field WA (1955-1958) (F-86D)

- 498th Fighter-Interceptor Squadron (1955–1968)

Geiger Field WA (1955-1963) (F-86D, F-102, F-106)
McChord AFB WA (1963-1966) (F-106)
Paine Field WA (1966) (F-106)
Hamilton AFB CA (1966-1968) (F-106)

- 518th Fighter-Interceptor Squadron (1955–1959)

George AFB CA (F-86D)

- 519th Fighter-Interceptor Squadron (1954–1955)

Sioux City AP IA (F-86D)

- 520th Fighter-Interceptor Squadron (1954–1955)

Geiger Field WA (F-86D)

- 538th Fighter-Interceptor Squadron (1955–1960)

Larson AFB WA (F-86D/L, F-104A, F-104A/B)

- 539th Fighter-Interceptor Squadron (1954–1967)

Stewart AFB NY (1954-1955) (F-86D)
McGuire AFB NJ (F-86L, F-106)

== See also ==
- F-106 Delta Dart units of the United States Air Force
