= 327th Aircraft Sustainment Wing =

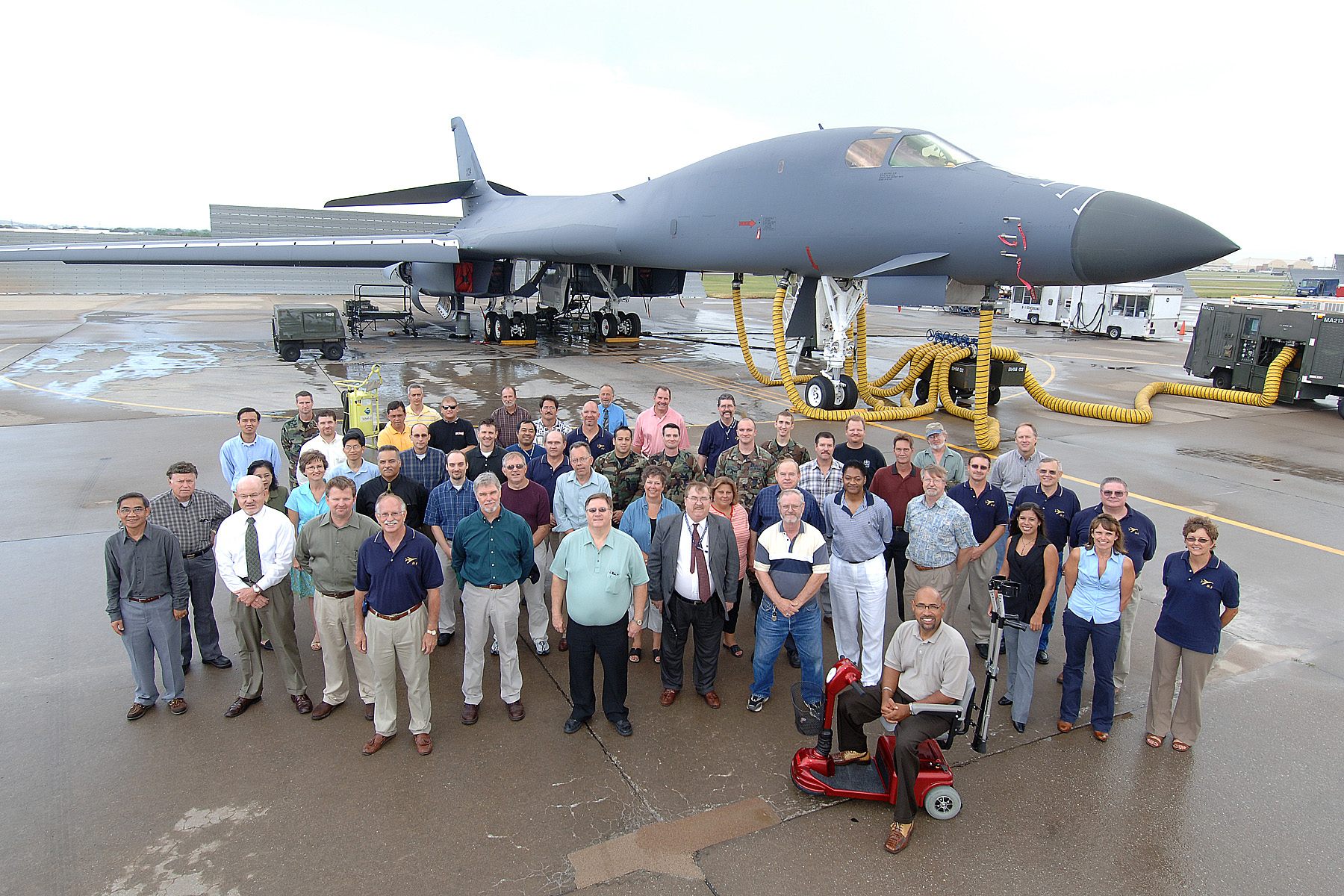
- B-1 Sustainment Squadron personnel in March 2007
- Active: 1942–1944, 1955–1966, 2005–2010
- Country: United States
- Branch: United States Air Force
- Type: Aircraft Maintenance
- Part of: Air Force Materiel Command; Oklahoma City Air Logistics Center
- Mottos: Ne Defecit Animus (Latin for 'Courage Does Not Fail Me') (1942–1958); Intercipere Recognoscere Destuere (Latin for 'Intercept, Identify, Destroy') (1958–1966)

Commanders
- Notable commanders: Nelson P. Jackson

Insignia
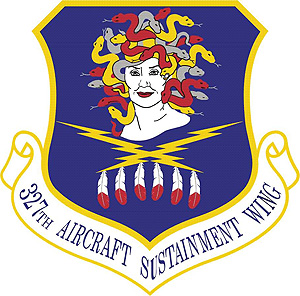
- 327th Aircraft Sustainment Wing emblem

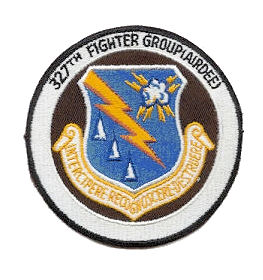
- Patch with 327th Fighter Group (Air Defense) emblem (Note: Approved 12 May 1958.)

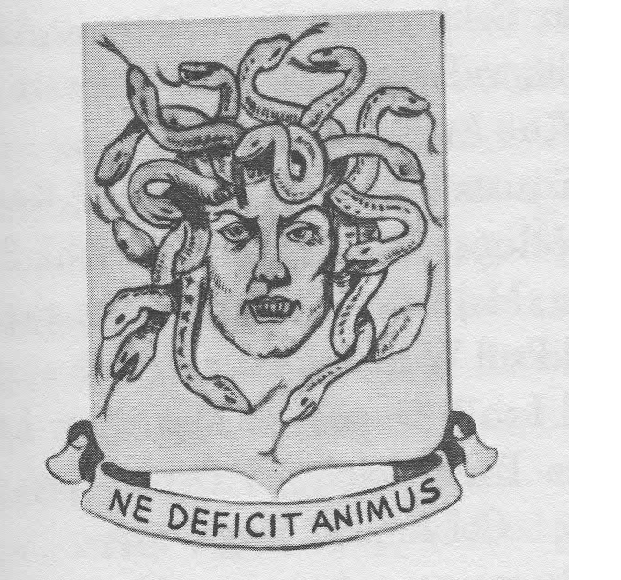
- 327th Fighter Group emblem (Note: Approved 27 February 1943. Description: Or, the head of the mythical Gorgon Medusa affronte azure armed gules.)

The 327th Aircraft Sustainment Wing is an inactive wing of the United States Air Force last based at Tinker Air Force Base, Oklahoma. It was last assigned to Air Force Materiel Command's Oklahoma City Air Logistics Center.

The wing was first activated in 1942 as the 327th Fighter Group. It initially flew the Curtiss P-40 Warhawk in the air defense role, but later acted as an operational and replacement training unit on Republic P-47 Thunderbolts until it was disbanded in a major 1944 reorganization of the Army Air Forces.

In 1955, as part of Air Defense Command's Project Arrow, which was aimed at reviving fighter units that had served during World War II, the group was reactivated at Truax Field Air National Guard Base, where it replaced the 520th Air Defense Group. It provided air defense for the Great Lakes region with North American F-86 Sabres and Convair F-102 Delta Daggers until it was inactivated in 1966.

The group was upgraded to wing size in 2005 and activated at Tinker Air Force Base when Air Force Materiel Command (AFMC) replaced its traditional directorate organizations with wings, groups and squadrons. It controlled logistic support systems for various large aircraft until 2010, when it was inactivated as AFMC returned to its previous organizational structure.

== History ==
=== World War II ===
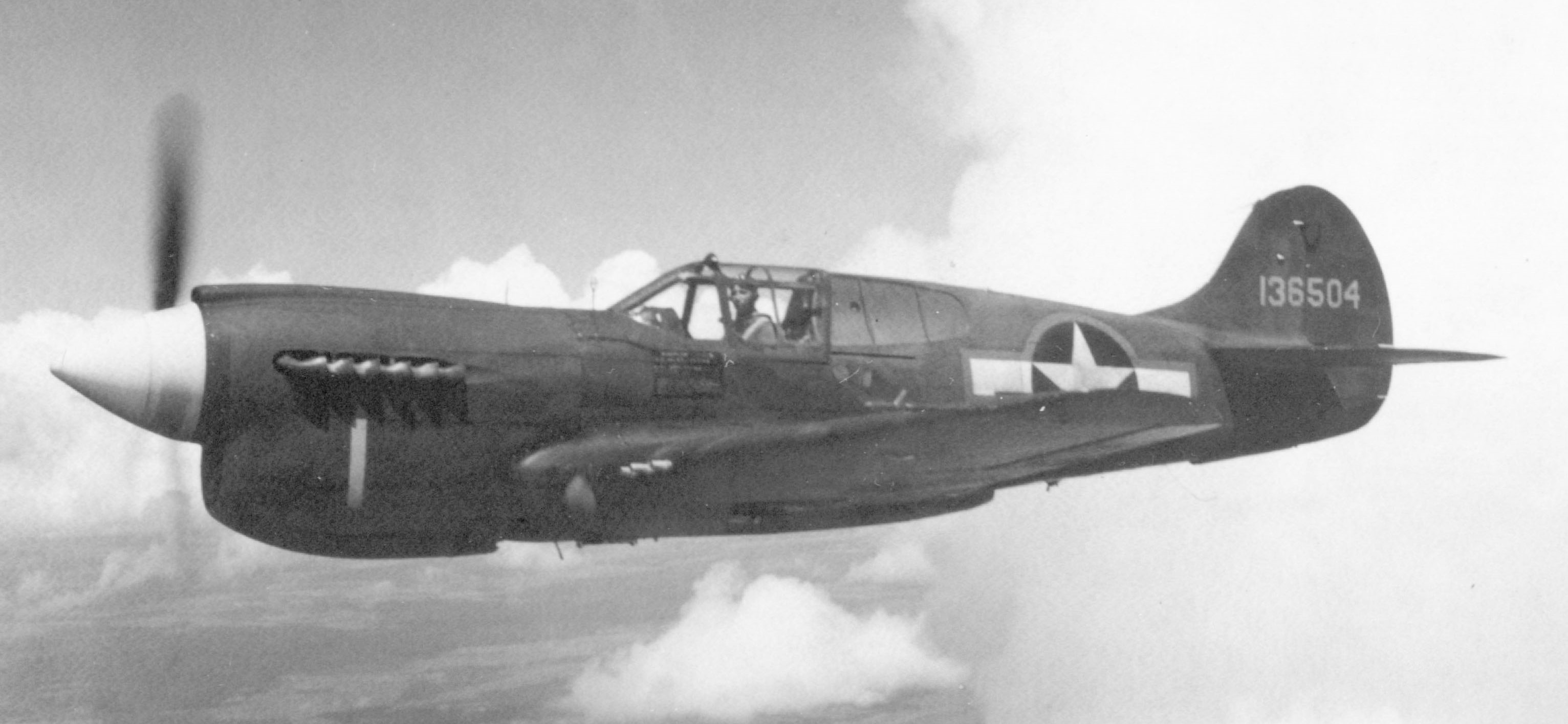
Group's first plane, the Curtiss P-40

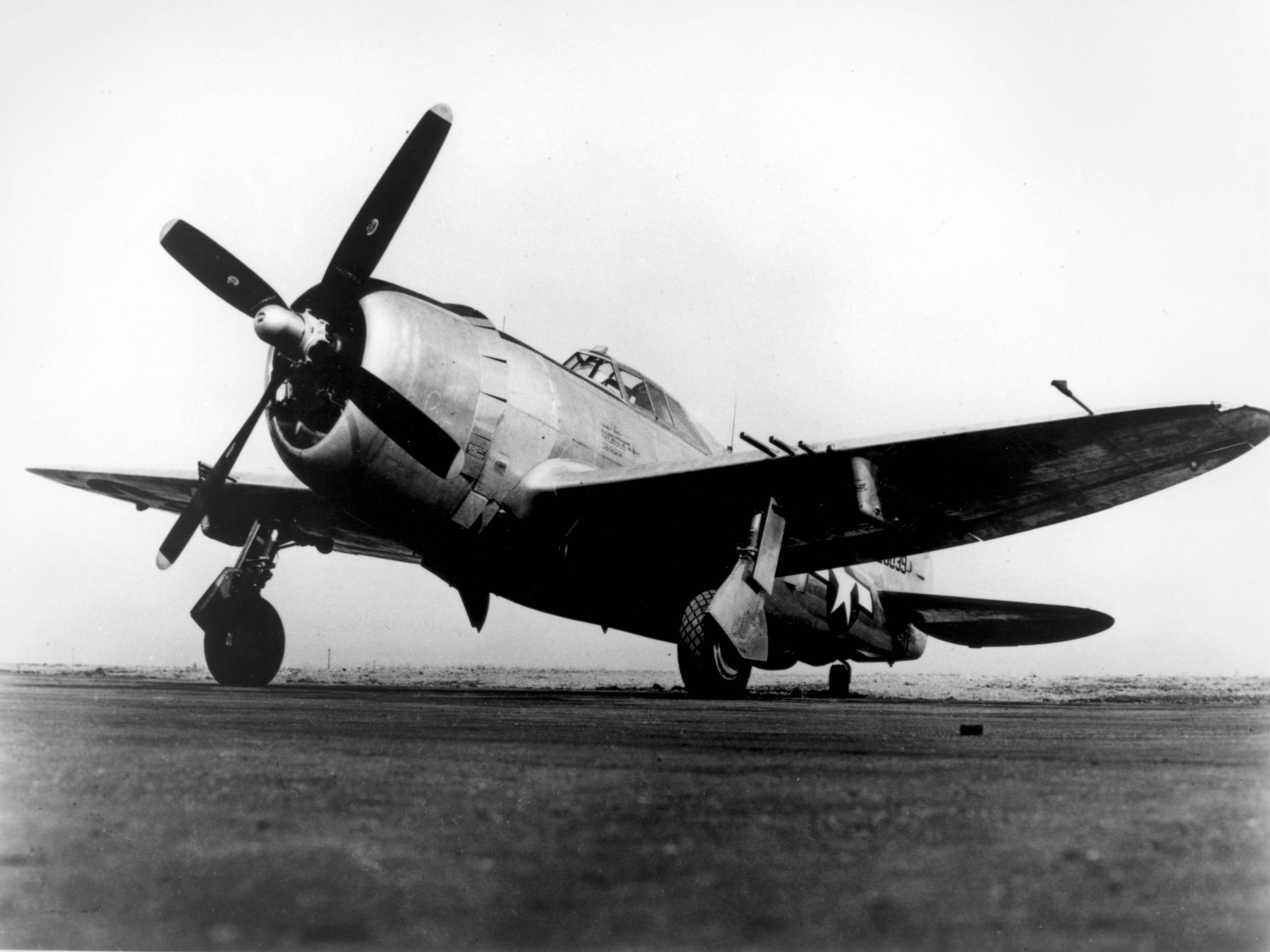
P-47 as flown by the 327th Fighter Group

The 327th Fighter Group was activated at Mitchel Field, New York flying Curtiss P-40 Warhawks and assigned to I Fighter Command in late August 1942 with the 323d, 324th, and 325th Fighter Squadrons assigned. Within a few days of activation, the group moved to Philadelphia Airport, and the following month to Richmond Army Air Base, Virginia. The group was part of the air defense force in the Mid-Atlantic region, and also served as an Operational Training Unit (OTU). The OTU program involved the use of an oversized parent unit to provide cadres to "satellite groups."

In February 1943, the 327th replaced its Warhawks with Republic P-47 Thunderbolts and added a fourth squadron, the 443d Fighter Squadron, to the group. In 1944 the group became a Replacement Training Unit (RTU) training replacement Thunderbolt pilots for combat duty. As an RTU, the group split, with group headquarters and the 323d and 324th Squadrons remaining at Richmond, while the 325th and 443d Squadrons moved to Norfolk Army Air Field, Virginia. (Note: The 325th Squadron had briefly moved to Millville Army Air Field in September 1943, but returned to Richmond before moving to Norfolk.) However, the Army Air Forces was finding that standard military units, based on relatively inflexible tables of organization were not well adapted to the training mission. Accordingly, it adopted a more functional system in which each of its bases was organized into a separate numbered unit. In the general reorganization, the group was disbanded on 10 April 1944 and replaced by Army Air Forces Base Units at Richmond and Norfolk as part of a major reorganization of the Army Air Forces.

=== Cold War ===
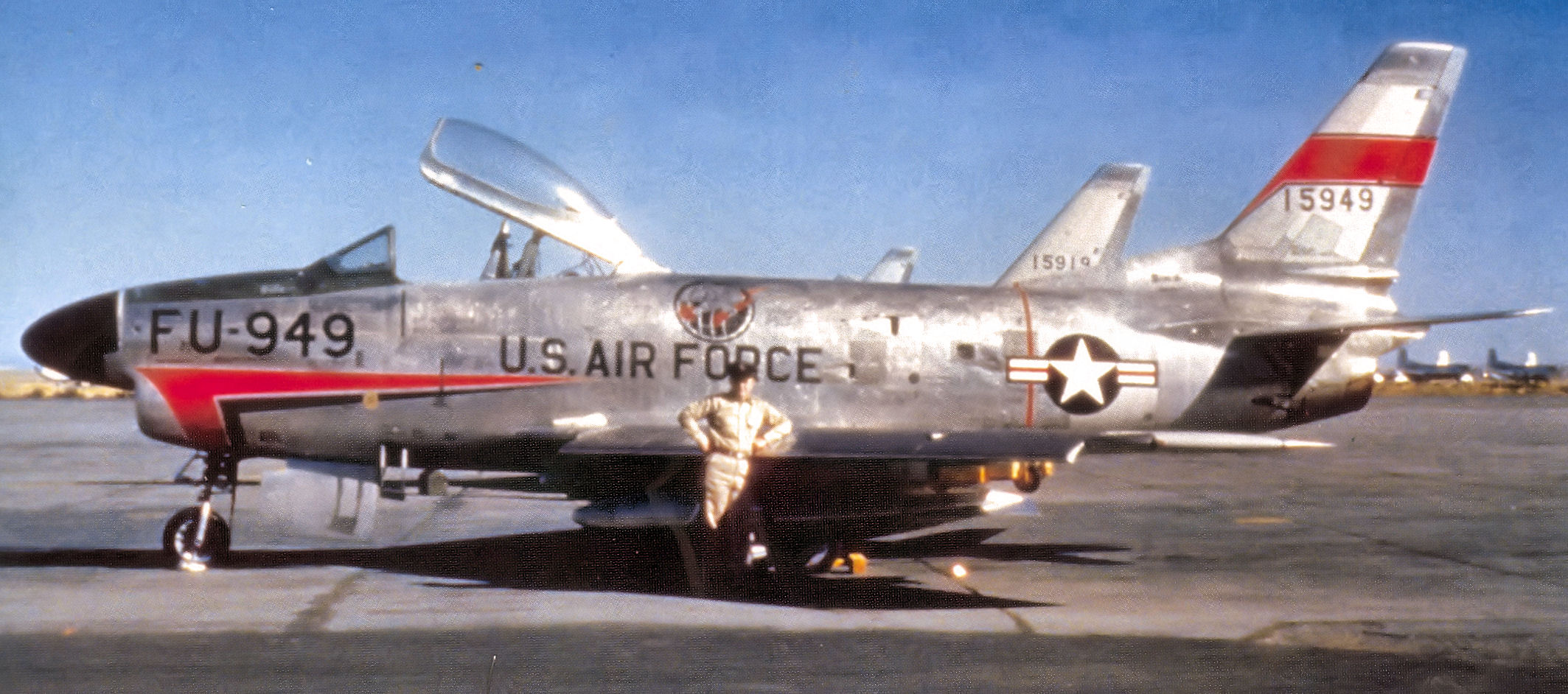
323d Fighter-Interceptor Squadron F-86D (Note: Aircraft is North American F-86D-30-NA Sabre serial 51-5949.)

The group was reconstituted, redesignated as the 327th Fighter Group (Air Defense), and activated in 1955 to replace the 520th Air Defense Group as part of Air Defense Command's Project Arrow, which was designed to bring back on the active list the fighter units which had compiled memorable records in the two world wars. It assumed the personnel and equipment of the 520th, while the 520th's operational squadrons, the 432d and 456th Fighter-Interceptor Squadrons transferred their personnel and rocket armed and radar equipped North American F-86D Sabres to the 323d and 325th Fighter-Interceptor Squadrons, which moved on paper to Truax from Larson Air Force Base, Washington and Hamilton Air Force Base, California respectively. These moves were made because another purpose of Project Arrow was to reunite fighter squadrons with their traditional groups. The group was assigned air defense of Great Lakes area and also was the host organization for USAF units at Truax. It was assigned a number of support organizations to fulfill its host responsibilities.

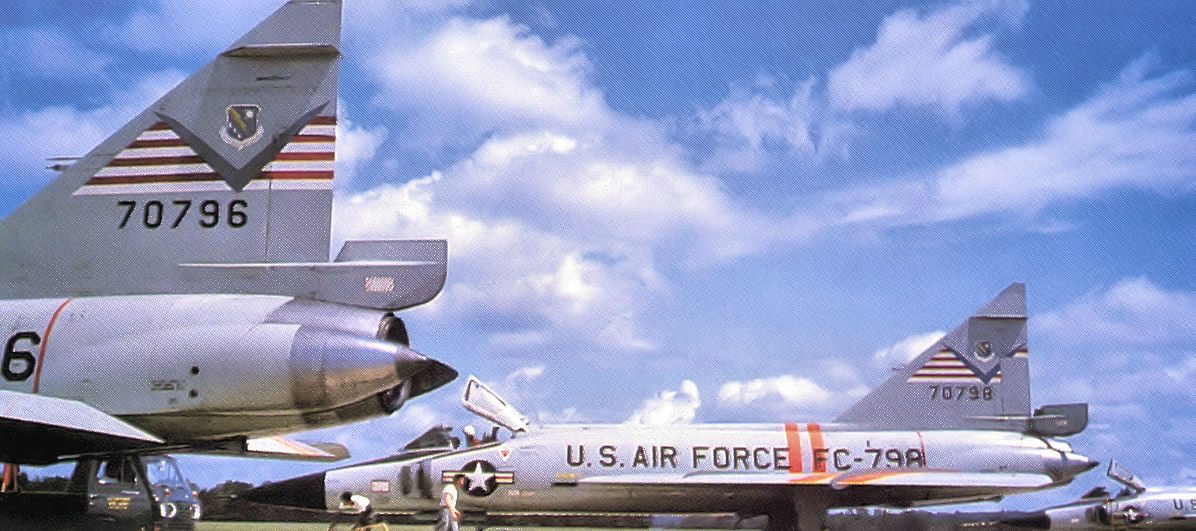
325th Fighter-Interceptor Squadron F-102s

The group's 323d Squadron converted to Convair F-102A Delta Daggers in November 1956, while the 325th Squadron followed in February 1957. In October 1957, the 61st Fighter-Interceptor Squadron was assigned to the group and moved to Truax Field from Ernest Harmon Air Force Base, Canada, where it had been part of the 4731st Air Defense Group, in a swap with the 323d, which replaced the 61st at Ernest Harmon. The group was reduced to a single operational squadron in 1960, when the 61st inactivated.

On 22 October 1962, at the beginning of the Cuban Missile Crisis, when President Kennedy announced the presence of Soviet intermediate-range ballistic missiles in Cuba. Continental Air Defense Command (CONAD) directed the dispersal of interceptors within the United States. The group sent one third of its aircraft to Grand Island Airport, Nebraska. All group aircraft, including those at home and those at Grand Island were armed and placed on fifteen-minute alert status. The increased alert posture was maintained through mid-November, when CONAD returned units to their normal alert status, except for those under the control of its 32d Region, which controlled air defense in the Southeastern United States.

Although the number of ADC interceptor squadrons remained almost constant in the early 1960s, attrition (and the fact that production lines closed in 1961) caused a gradual drop in the number of planes assigned to a squadron, from 24 to typically 18 by 1964. The force reduction continued, finally resulting in a reduction in the number of interceptor units, and the group was inactivated in the spring of 1966.

=== Logistics support ===
The group was redesignated the 327th Aircraft Sustainment Wing and activated in 2005 as part of the Air Force Materiel Command Transformation initiative that replaced traditional staff offices in the command's centers with wings, groups, and squadrons. The wing organized, directed and controlled total life-cycle management of 94 Boeing B-52 Stratofortress, 585 Boeing KC-135 Stratotankers and C-135s, 69 Rockwell B-1 Lancers and 416 contractor logistics (including tanker, trainer, telemetry, airlift, command & control and US Presidential aircraft) aircraft. Other supported systems included the Northrop Grumman B-2 Spirit, Boeing E-3 Sentry aircraft, Air Traffic Control and Landing Systems (TRACALS), and the worldwide High Frequency Global Communications System. The wing was also responsible for modification and upgrades to these systems. It was inactivated in 2010 and replaced by the Aerospace Sustainment Directorate of Oklahoma City Air Logistics Center when Materiel Command returned to its traditional organizational structure.

== Lineage ==
- Constituted as the 327th Fighter Group (Single Engine) on 24 June 1942

Activated on 19 August 1942
Disbanded on 10 April 1944

- Reconstituted and redesignated 327th Fighter Group (Air Defense), on 20 June 1955

Activated on 18 August 1955
Discontinued and inactivated on 25 June 1966

- Redesignated 327th Tactical Fighter Group on 31 July 1985
- Redesignated 327th Aircraft Sustainment Wing on 31 January 2005

Activated on 18 February 2005
Inactivated on 30 June 2010

=== Assignments ===
- I Fighter Command, 18 August 1942 – 1943 (attached to Philadelphia Air Defense Wing, 27 August 1942 – 22 September 1942)
- Philadelphia Air Defense Wing, 1943
- I Fighter Command, 1943 – 10 April 1944
- 4706th Air Defense Wing, 18 August 1955
- 37th Air Division, 8 July 1956
- 30th Air Division, 1 April 1959
- Chicago Air Defense Sector, 1 June 1959
- 20th Air Division, 1 April 1966 – 25 June 1966
- Oklahoma City Air Logistics Center, 18 February 2005 – 30 June 2010

=== Stations ===
- Mitchel Field, New York, 25 August 1942
- Philadelphia Airport, Pennsylvania, 27 August 1942
- Richmond Army Air Base, Virginia, ca. 22 September 1942 – 10 April 1944
- Truax Field, Wisconsin, 18 August 1955 – 25 June 1966
- Tinker Air Force Base, Oklahoma, 18 February 2005 – 30 June 2010

=== Components ===
==== Operational Squadrons ====
- 61st Fighter Squadron, 10 October 1957 – 25 July 1960
- 323d Fighter Squadron (later Fighter-Interceptor Squadron), 25 August 1942 – 10 April 1944; 18 August 1955 – 15 October 1957
- 324th Fighter Squadron, 25 August 1942 – 10 April 1944
- 325th Fighter Squadron (later Fighter-Interceptor Squadron), 25 August 1942 – 10 April 1944; 18 August 1955 – 25 June 1966

detached to Philadelphia Fighter Wing, 15 September 1943 – 28 January 1944

- 443d Fighter Squadron, 24 February 1943 – 10 April 1944

==== Support Units ====
- 327th USAF Infirmary (later 327th USAF Dispensary), 18 August 1955 – 25 June 1966
- 327th Air Base Squadron (later 327th Combat Support Squadron), 18 August 1955 – 25 June 1966
- 327th Armament & Electronics Maintenance Squadron, 1 December 1958 – 1 August 1960
- 327th Consolidated Aircraft Maintenance Squadron, 8 July 1957 – 1 December 1958, 1 August 1960 – 25 June 1966
- 327th Field Maintenance Squadron, 1 December 1958 – 1 August 1960
- 327th Materiel Squadron, 18 August 1955 – 1 August 1964
- 327th Organizational Maintenance Squadron, 1 December 1958 – 1 August 1960
- 327th Supply Squadron, 1 August 1964 – 25 June 1966

==== Sustainment Units ====
- 327th Bomber and Cruise Missile Sustainment Group (later 327th Aircraft Sustainment Group), 18 February 2005 – 30 June 2010

540th Aircraft Sustainment Squadron

- 427th Aircraft Sustainment Group, 11 January 2008 – 30 June 2010

553d Aircraft Sustainment Squadron
554th Aircraft Sustainment Squadron
555th Aircraft Sustainment Squadron

- 639th Aircraft Sustainment Group, 1 April 2008 – 30 June 2010

536th Aircraft Sustainment Squadron
537th Aircraft Sustainment Squadron
538th Aircraft Sustainment Squadron
539th Aircraft Sustainment Squadron

- 727th Aircraft Sustainment Group, 14 April 2006 – 30 June 2010

544th Aircraft Sustainment Squadron
545th Aircraft Sustainment Squadron
546th Aircraft Sustainment Squadron
547th Aircraft Sustainment Squadron

- 747th Aircraft Sustainment Group, 14 April 2006 – 30 June 2010

557th Aircraft Sustainment Squadron
558th Aircraft Sustainment Squadron

- 827th Aircraft Sustainment Group, 14 April 2006 – 30 June 2010

550th Aircraft Sustainment Squadron
551st Aircraft Sustainment Squadron
552nd Aircraft Sustainment Squadron

=== Aircraft ===
- Curtiss P-40 Warhawk, 1942–1943
- Republic P-47 Thunderbolt, 1943–1944
- North American F-86D Sabre, 1955–1957
- Convair F-102A Delta Dagger, 1956–1966

=== Campaigns ===
Service Streamer	Campaign	Dates	Notes
	American Theater without inscription	25 August 1942 – 10 April 1944	327th Fighter Group

== See also ==
- List of inactive AFCON wings of the United States Air Force
- List of Sabre and Fury units in the US military
