= 323 Squadron =

323 Squadron may refer to:

- No. 323 Expeditionary Combat Support Squadron RAAF, Royal Australian Air Force
- 323 Squadron RNLAF, a unit of the Royal Netherlands Air Force, based at Eglin Air Force Base
- 323d Aero Squadron, an aero squadron in the Air Service, United States Army
- 323d Fighter-Interceptor Squadron, United States Air Force
- 323d Strategic Reconnaissance Squadron, United States Air Force
- VMFA-323, United States Marine Corps
