= 520th Air Defense Group =

Disbanded United States Air Force organization

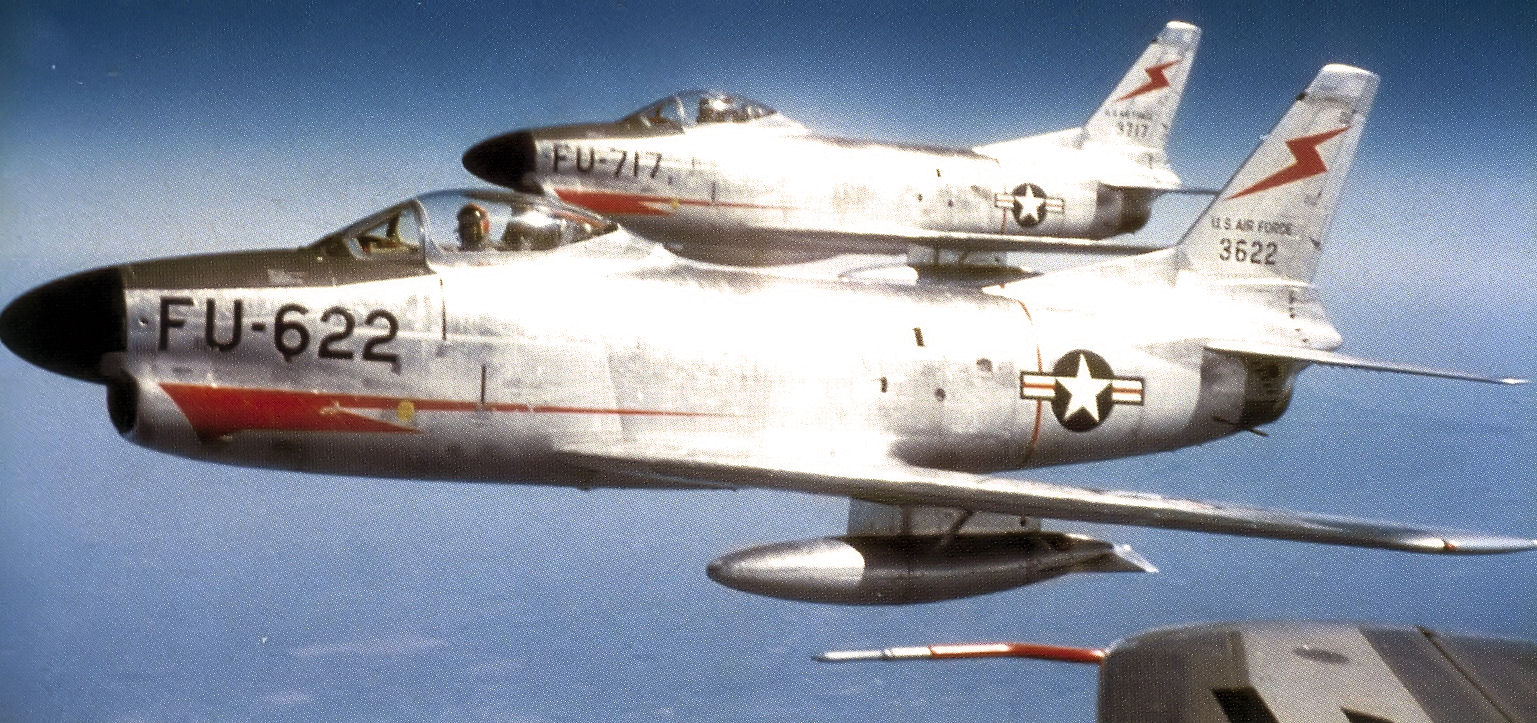
- F-86D Sabres of the group's 432d Fighter-Interceptor Squadron (Note: Aircraft are North American F-86D-40-NA Sabres, serials 52-3622 and 52-3717. 52-3622 ran out of fuel on a gunnery range in South Dakota and crashed on 23 March 1954; 52-3717 was transferred to the Yugoslav Air Force. Taken in November 1953. Baugher, Joe (7 April 2023). "1952 USAF Serial Numbers". Joe Baugher.)
- Active: 1944–1945; 1953–1955
- Country: United States
- Branch: United States Air Force
- Type: Fighter interceptor
- Role: Air defense

The 520th Air Defense Group is a disbanded United States Air Force organization. Its last assignment was with the 4706th Air Defense Wing at Truax Field, Wisconsin, where it was inactivated in 1955. The group was originally activated as the 520th Air Service Group, a support unit for the 340th Bombardment Group at the end of World War II in Italy and then redeployed to the United States where it was inactivated in 1945.

The group was activated once again in 1953, when Air Defense Command (ADC) established it as the headquarters for a dispersed fighter-interceptor squadron and the medical, aircraft maintenance, and administrative squadrons supporting it. It was replaced in 1955 when ADC transferred its mission, equipment, and personnel to the 327th Fighter Group in a project that replaced air defense groups commanding fighter squadrons with fighter groups with distinguished records during World War II.

== History ==
=== World War II ===
The group was first activated during World War II in Italy in late 1944 as the 520th Air Service Group as part of a reorganization of Army Air Forces (AAF) support groups in which the AAF replaced service groups that included personnel from other branches of the Army and supported two combat groups with air service groups including only Air Corps units. Designed to support a single combat group. Its 946th Air Engineering Squadron provided maintenance that was beyond the capability of the combat group, its 770th Air Materiel Squadron handled all supply matters, and its Headquarters & Base Services Squadron provided other support. The group supported the 340th Bombardment Group in Italy. The group returned to the US and was inactivated in late 1945. It was disbanded in 1948.

=== Cold War ===
During the Cold War, the group was reconstituted, redesignated as the 520th Air Defense Group, and activated at Truax Field in 1953 with responsibility for air defense of the Great Lakes area. It was assigned the 432d and 433d Fighter-Interceptor Squadrons (FIS), which were already stationed at Truax Field, as its operational components. The 432d FIS was flying North American F-86 Sabres, while the 433d FIS was flying Northrop F-89 Scorpions equipped with airborne intercept radar. Both squadrons had been assigned directly to the 31st Air Division. The group also replaced the 78th Air Base Squadron as the USAF host unit for Truax Field. It was assigned three squadrons to perform its support responsibilities.

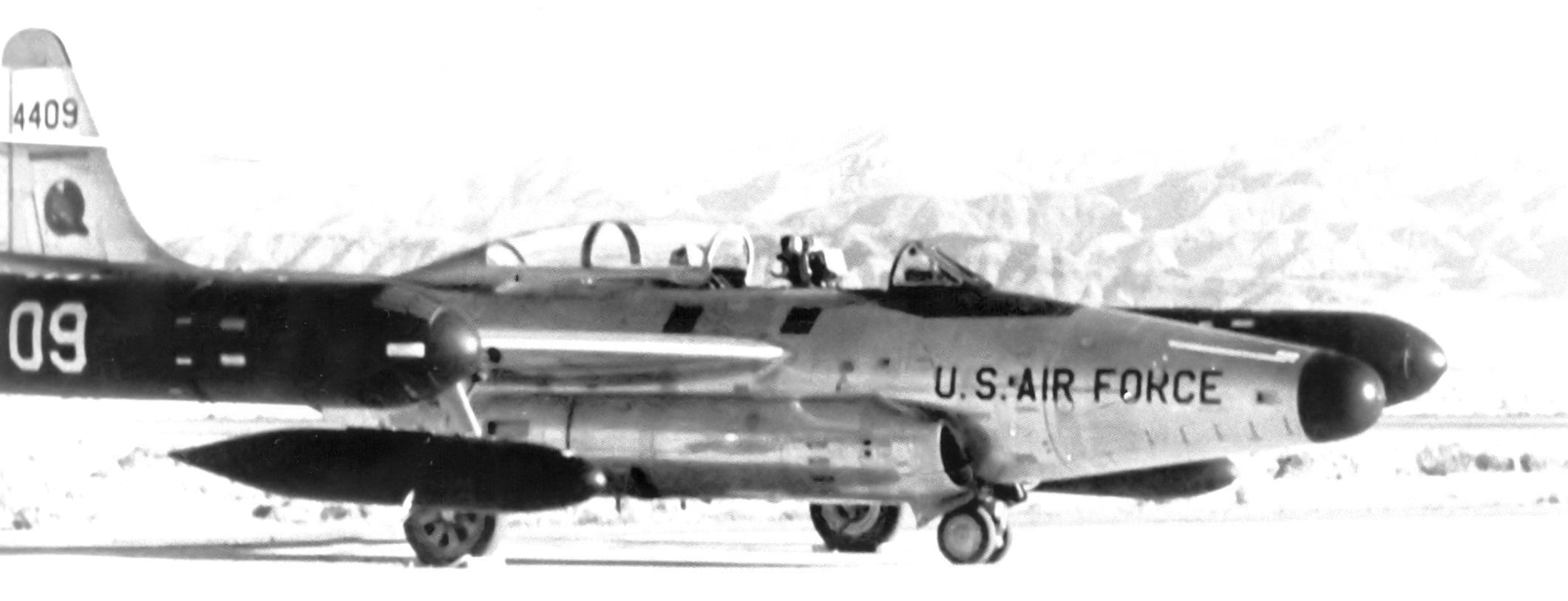
F-89 of the 432d FIS (Note: Aircraft is Northrop F-89H-5-NO Scorpion, serial 54-409. This image shows a later model of the F-89 than the one the squadron flew while it was part of the 520th. This aircraft was used as a chase plane for Operation Plumbbob and the John shot, the only live firing of the AIR-2 Genie armed with a nuclear warhead. Baugher, Joe (7 April 2023). "1954 USAF Serial Numbers". Joe Baugher.)

In March 1953, the 432d FIS converted to a later radar equipped and Mighty Mouse rocket armed model of the "Sabre". In July 1954, the 433d FIS moved to Alaska and was reassigned. The following month, the 456th Fighter-Interceptor Squadron was activated to replace the 433d FIS. The 456th FIS was also equipped with Sabres. The group was inactivated and replaced by the 327th Fighter Group (Air Defense) as part of Air Defense Command's Project Arrow, which was designed to bring back on the active list the fighter units which had compiled memorable records in the two world wars. The group was disbanded once again in 1984.

== Lineage ==
- Constituted as 520th Air Service Group

Activated on 27 December 1944
Inactivated c. 7 November 1945
Disbanded 8 October 1948

- Reconstituted and redesignated as 520th Air Defense Group on 21 January 1953

Activated on 16 February 1953
Inactivated on 18 August 1955
Disbanded on 27 September 1984

=== Assignments ===
- Unknown, 27 December 1944 – 7 November 1945 (Note: Probably XII Air Force Service Command until c. July 1945, Third Air Force after August 1945.)
- 4706th Defense Wing (later 4706th Air Defense Wing), 16 February 1953 – 18 August 1955

=== Stations ===
- Cervioni, Italy, 27 December 1944 – 15 April 1945
- Rimini, Italy, 15 April 1945 – 15 July 1945 (sic) (Note: There is an obvious error in the departure date from Italy recorded in the unit history, since it requires a crossing of the Atlantic by ship in a day.)
- Naples, Italy, 15 July 1945 – July 1945
- Camp Patrick Henry, Virginia, 18 July 1945 – August 1945
- Seymour Johnson Field, NC August 1945 – 15 September 1945
- Columbia Army Air Base, South Carolina, 15 September 1945 – ca. 7 November 1945
- Truax Field, Wisconsin, 16 February 1953 – 18 August 1955

=== Components ===
Operational Squadrons

- 432d Fighter-Interceptor Squadron, 16 February 1953 – 18 August 1955
- 433d Fighter-Interceptor Squadron, 16 February 1953 – 14 July 1954
- 456th Fighter-Interceptor Squadron, 8 August 1954 – 18 August 1955

Deployed to: George Air Force Base and detached to Western Air Defense Force

Support Units

- 520th Air Base Squadron, 16 February 1953 – 18 August 1955
- 520th Materiel Squadron, 16 February 1953 – 18 August 1955
- 520th Medical Squadron (later 520th USAF Infirmary), 16 February 1953 – 18 August 1955
- 770th Air Materiel Squadron, 25 January 1945 – 7 November 1945
- 946th Air Engineering Squadron, 25 January 1945 – 7 November 1945

=== Aircraft ===
- North American F-86F Sabre, 1953
- North American F-86D Sabre, 1953–1955
- Northrop F-89C Scorpion, 1953–1954
- Lockheed F-94 Starfire, 1953

=== Commanders ===
- Col. L. E. Brooks 17 Dec 1944–1945
- Unknown, 16 Feb 1953 – 18 Aug 1955

== See also ==
- List of United States Air Force Aerospace Defense Command Interceptor Squadrons
- List of F-86 Sabre units
- F-89 Scorpion units of the United States Air Force
- F-94 Starfire units of the United States Air Force
