= Truax Field =

Truax Field may refer to:

- Dane County Regional Airport, Dane County, Wisconsin, United States
- Truax Field Air National Guard Base, an Air National Guard facility located at Dane Co. Regional Airport
- Naval Air Station Corpus Christi in Corpus Christi, Texas, United States
