= Wisconsin World War II Army Airfields =

Wisconsin World War II Army Airfields
- Part of World War II

Site information
- Type: Army Airfields

Site history
- Built: 1940-1944
- In use: 1940-present

In Wisconsin multiple airfields were constructed and used by the United States Army Air Forces during World War II. The main purpose of these installations was for training pilots and aircrews of USAAF fighters and bombers.

A majority of the Wisconsin airfields were under the command of First Air Force or the Army Air Forces Training Command (AAFTC) and the other USAAF support commands (Air Technical Service Command (ATSC); Air Transport Command (ATC) or Troop Carrier Command) commanded a significant number of airfields in support roles.

== Major airfields ==
Air Technical Service Command

- General Billy Mitchell Field, Milwaukee

364th Base Headquarters and Air Base Squadron, 25 May 1942-31 March 1944
567th Army Air Force Base Unit, 31 March 1944-15 August 1944
4302nd Army Air Force Base Unit, 15 August 1944-1 September 1944
Now: General Mitchell International Airport and General Mitchell Air National Guard Base (IATA: MKE, ICAO: KMKE, FAA LID: MKE)

Army Air Force Training Command

- Truax Field, Madision

Army Air Forces Technical School (Radio No. 3), 22 July 1942-1 November 1945
334th Base Headquarters and Air Base Squadron, 23 July 1942-30 April 1944
3508th Army Air Force Base Unit, 1 May 1944-30 November 1945
Now: Dane County Regional Airport and Truax Field Air National Guard Base (IATA: MSN, ICAO: KMSN, FAA LID: MSN)

First Air Force

- Camp Williams Army Air Field, Finley, Wisconsin

363rd Base Headquarters and Air Base Squadron, June 1942-October 1943
Now: Volk Field Air National Guard Base (IATA: VOK, ICAO: KVOK, FAA LID: VOK)
