= 323d Fighter-Interceptor Squadron =

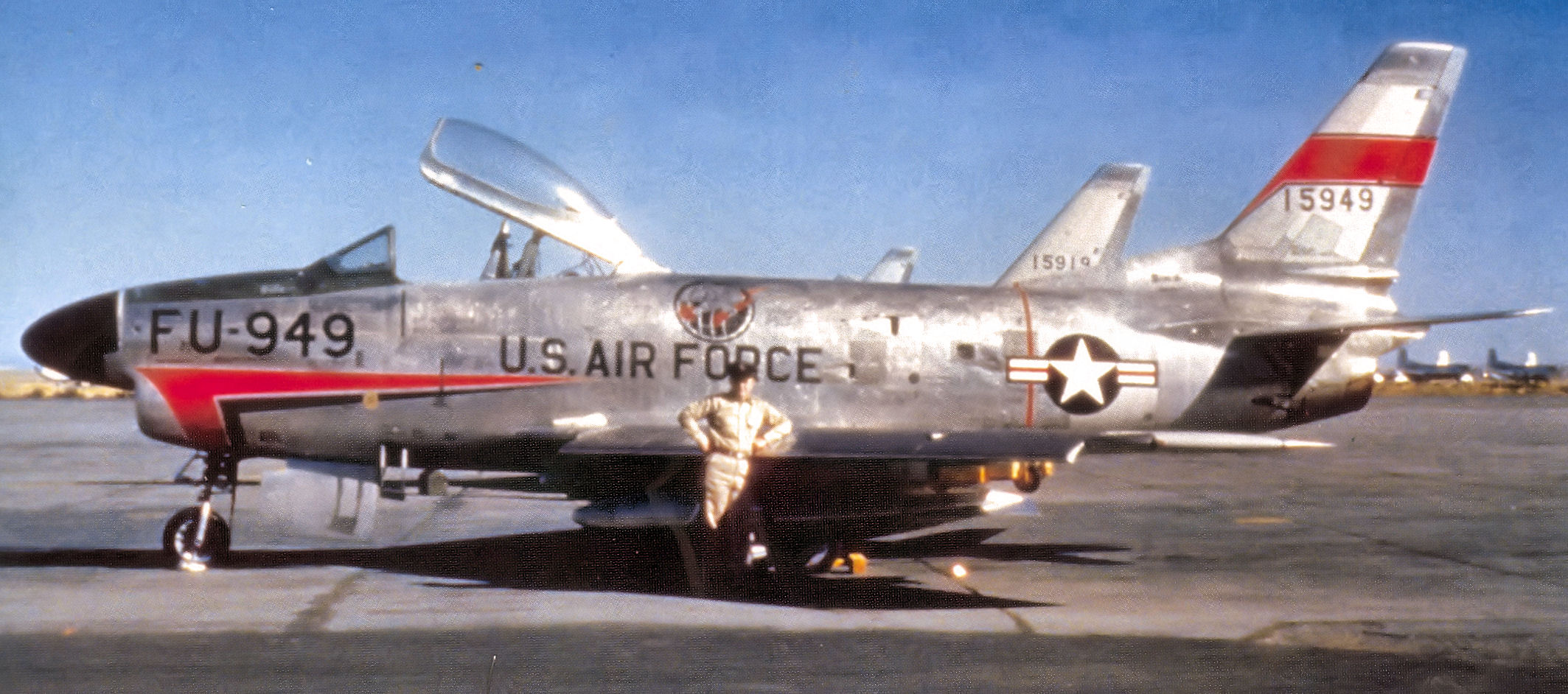
- North American F-86D Sabre 51-5949, 25th Air Division, Larson AFB, Washington, April 1955
- Active: 1942–1944; 1952-1960
- Country: United States
- Branch: United States Air Force
- Type: Fighter-Interceptor
- Role: Air Defense
- Engagements: World War II (American Defense)

- Decorations: Air Force Outstanding Unit Award (3x)

Insignia
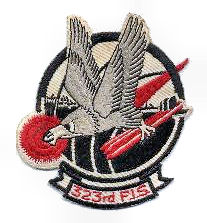
- Patch with 323d Fighter-Interceptor Squadron emblem

The 323d Fighter-Interceptor Squadron is an inactive United States Air Force unit. Its last assignment was with Air Defense Command at Ernest Harmon Air Force Base, Newfoundland, where it was inactivated on 1 July 1960.

The squadron was first activated as the 323d Fighter Squadron during World War II. The unit served as a crew training unit until it was disbanded in a major reorganization of Army Air Forces units in the United States in 1944.

The squadron was reconstituted in 1953 as Air Defense Command expanded in the early 1950s. It initially provided defense for the Northwestern United States, but in 1957 moved to Newfoundland where it performed the same mission until inactivated in 1960.

== History ==
=== World War II ===
The squadron was first activated in August 1942 at Mitchel Field, New York as one of the original three squadrons of the 327th Fighter Group. The following month it moved to its permanent home at Richmond Army Air Base, Virginia. The squadron initially performed acted as an operational training unit with Curtiss P-40 Warhawks as part of the I Fighter Command of First Air Force for single-engine pilots who had just graduated from Army Air Forces Training Command advanced flying schools. It was an oversized unit providing cadres to newly organized "satellite groups". After February 1944, the squadron became a replacement training unit training pilots in the Republic P-47D Thunderbolt before they were sent overseas to combat units as replacement pilots.

However, the Army Air Forces (AAF) was finding that standard military units, based on relatively inflexible tables of organization, were proving less well adapted to the training mission. Accordingly, a more functional system was adopted in which each base was organized into a separate numbered unit. The squadron was disbanded in 1944 as the AAF converted to the AAF Base Unit system and replaced by the 390th Army Air Forces Base Unit, Squadron "A", which assumed its mission, personnel and equipment.

=== Cold War Air Defense ===
The 323d was reconstituted as the 323d Fighter-Interceptor Squadron under the 25th Air Division of Air Defense Command (ADC) at Larson Air Force Base, Washington in November 1952 as part of the buildup of air defense interceptor units in the United States during the early years of the Cold War. The squadron was temporarily attached to the 4702d Defense Wing, until the 4704th Defense Wing became operational following its move from California to Washington. The squadron mission was air defense of the Pacific Northwest, particularly the Grand Coulee Dam and the Hanford Nuclear Reservation. The squadron was temporarily equipped with World War II era North American F-51 Mustangs, but upgraded to Mighty Mouse rocket armed and airborne intercept radar equipped North American F-86D Sabre jet interceptors in 1953.

In the summer of 1955 ADC implemented Project Arrow, which was designed to bring back on the active list the fighter units which had compiled memorable records in the two world wars. As part of this project, the 327th Fighter Group was activated to replace the 520th Air Defense Group at Truax Field, Wisconsin Because Project Arrow also reunited squadrons with their traditional group headquarters, the 323nd moved on paper to Truax, where it assumed the mission, personnel and aircraft of the 432d Fighter-Interceptor Squadron, which moved on paper to another ADC base. The unit's new mission was air defense of the upper Great Lakes region. In November 1956, the squadron upgraded to supersonic Convair F-102 Delta Daggers equipped with data link to communicate directly with Semi-Automatic Ground Environment (SAGE) computers located in combat control centers and armed with the AIM-4 Falcon Missile.

The squadron transferred in 1957 to Ernest Harmon AFB, Newfoundland, swapping stations with the 61st Fighter-Interceptor Squadron, which moved to Truax from Harmon. Its mission became air defense of the Newfoundland Straits and the Great Circle polar route from the Soviet Union over Greenland to Canada and the United States. In 1960 it was assigned directly to the Goose Air Defense Sector, but was inactivated later that year due to the emerging threat of missiles rather than crewed aircraft.

== Lineage ==
- Constituted as the 323d Fighter Squadron (Single Engine) on 24 June 1942

Activated on 25 August 1942
Disbanded on 10 April 1944

- Reconstituted, and redesignated 323d Fighter-Interceptor Squadron on 14 November 1952

Activated on 26 November 1952
Discontinued on 1 July 1960

=== Assignments ===
- 327th Fighter Group: 25 August 1942 – 10 April 1944
- 25th Air Division: (attached to 4704th Defense Wing): 26 November 1952
- 4702d Defense Wing: 19 January 1953
- 9th Air Division: 8 October 1954
- 327th Fighter Group: 18 August 1955
- 4731st Air Defense Group: 15 October 1957
- Goose Air Defense Sector: 6 June 1960 – 1 July 1960

=== Stations ===
- Mitchel Field, New York, 25 August 1942
- Philadelphia Municipal Airport, Pennsylvania, 25 August 1942
- Richmond Army Air Base, Virginia, 19 September 1942 – 10 April 1944
- Larson Air Force Base, Washington, 26 November 1952
- Truax Field, Wisconsin, 18 August 1955
- Ernest Harmon Air Force Base, Newfoundland, 15 October 1957 – 1 July 1960

=== Aircraft ===
- Curtiss P-40 Warhawk, 1942–1943
- Republic P-47D Thunderbolt, 1943–1944
- North American F-51D Mustang, 1952
- North American F-86D Sabre, 1953–1956
- Convair F-102A and TF-102A Delta Dagger, 1956–1960
