= 325th Fighter-Interceptor Squadron =

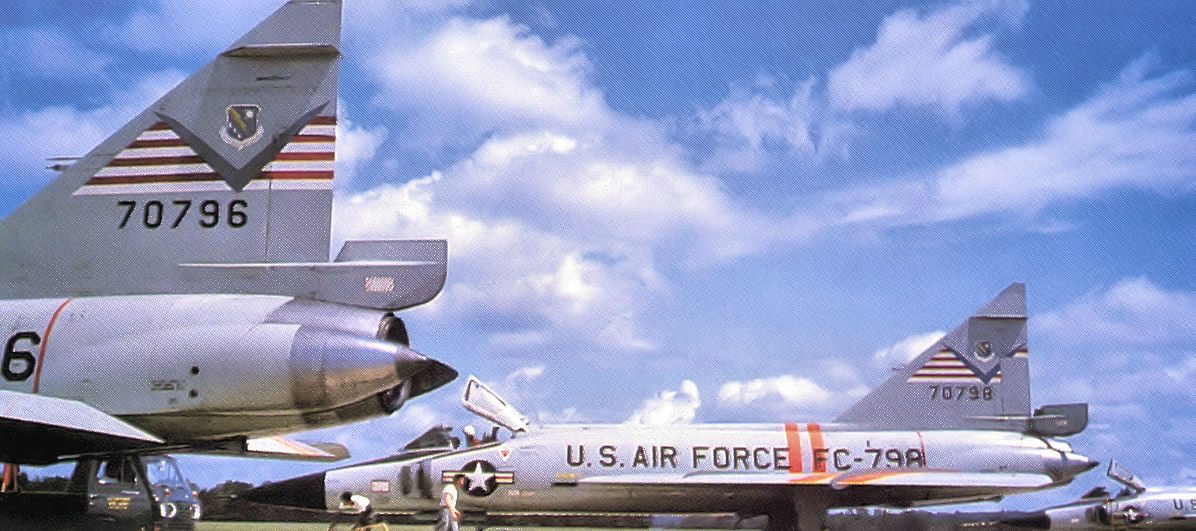
- Two squadron Convair F-102s in 1960
- Active: 1942–1944; 1953–1966
- Country: United States
- Branch: United States Air Force
- Role: Fighter Interceptor

Insignia
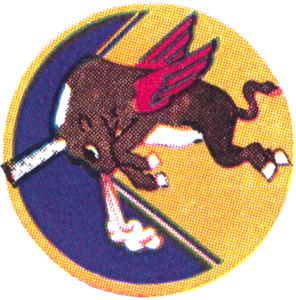
- 325th Fighter-Interceptor Squadron emblem (Note: Approved 14 May 1944. Description: On a golden orange disc, a segment medium blue being pushed to dexter by a charging, caricatured, brown and white young bull, winged red, outlined blue, and having machine gun barrels for horns, snorting vapor cloud white, outlined red toward base.)

The 325th Fighter-Interceptor Squadron is an inactive United States Air Force unit, last assigned to Air Defense Command at Truax Field, Wisconsin, where it was inactivated on 25 June 1966.

The squadron was first active as a training unit during World War II.

== History ==
=== World War II ===
The squadron was activated as the 325th Fighter Squadron, one of the original squadrons of the 327th Fighter Group. It performed air defense missions, but became an operational training unit until February 1944, and afterward served as a replacement training unit until being disbanded in April 1944.

=== Air Defense Command ===
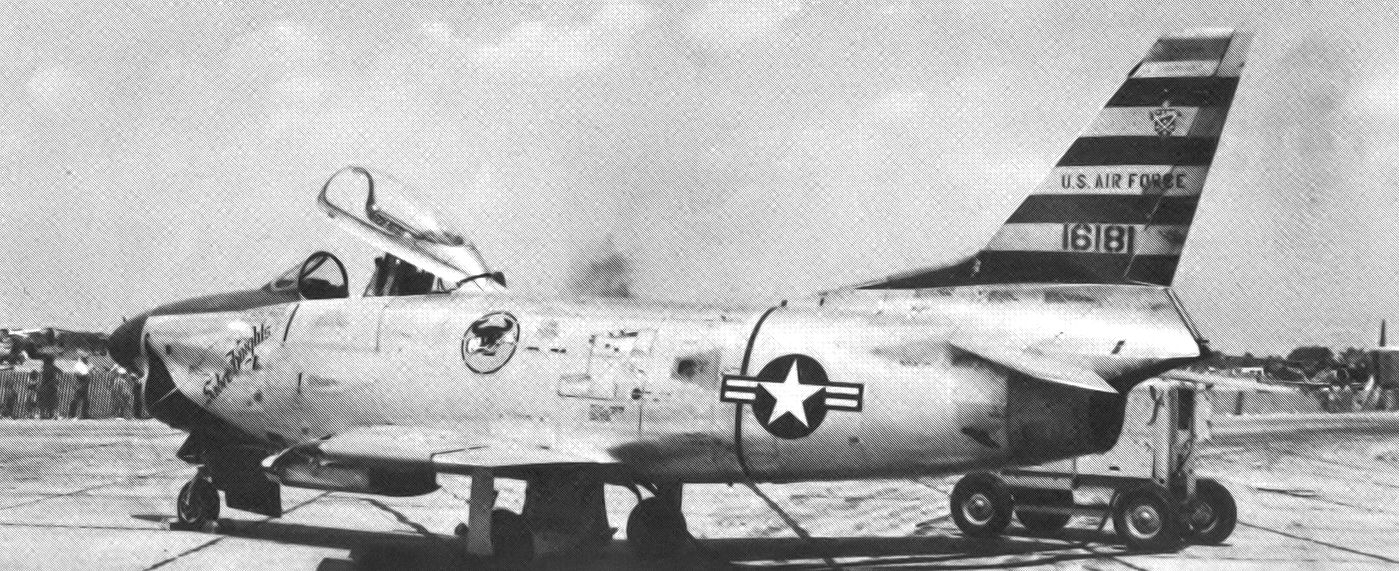
North American F-86D Sabre 51-6181, at Truax Field in 1955

The squadron was reconstituted as the 325th Fighter-Interceptor Squadron and activated at Travis Air Force Base in April 1953, where it was equipped with the radar equipped and Mighty Mouse rocket armed North American F-86D Sabres. The following February, it moved to Hamilton Air Force Base. From both bases it operated to defend the Pacific Coast.

The squadron moved on paper to Truax Field, Wisconsin on 18 August 1955, where it assumed the mission, personnel and equipment of 456th Fighter-Interceptor Squadron, which moved in turn to Castle Air Force Base, California as part of Project Arrow, an Air Defense Command program which was designed to bring back on the active list the fighter units which had compiled memorable records in the two world wars. Two years later, it equipped with the Convair F-102 Delta Dagger. At Truax, it was responsible for the air defense of the upper Midwest until 1966.

On 22 October 1962, before President John F. Kennedy told Americans that missiles were in place in Cuba, the squadron dispersed a portion of its force to Des Moines Airport at the start of the Cuban Missile Crisis. At the beginning of the crisis, the 331st Fighter-Interceptor Squadron had deployed F-102s to Homestead Air Force Base, Florida. The 325th was the only F-102 squadron whose planes had not been modified to carry the GAR-11 Falcon nuclear missile and its planes were armed with Mighty Mouse rockets, which provided a superior low altitude intercept capability. The 325th replaced the 331st at Homestead to take advantage of this capability. Following the crisis, twenty of the squadron's F-102s were kept at Homestead until Air Defense Command (ADC) decided to replace the F-102s there with F-104s. Although the F-104 had been removed from the ADC inventory in 1960 because of its lack of an all-weather capability, this was not a factor at Homestead because Cuba lacked a bomber force and the F-104 had a superior fighter against fighter capability. The alert responsibility at Homestead was assumed by F-104s of the 319th Fighter-Interceptor Squadron on 15 April 1963 and the 325th's planes returned to Truax.

== Lineage ==
- Constituted as the 325th Fighter Squadron on 24 June 1942

Activated on 25 August 1942
Disbanded on 10 April 1944

- Reconstituted and redesignated 325th Fighter-Interceptor Squadron on 11 February 1953

Activated on 20 April 1953
Inactivated on 25 June 1966

=== Assignments ===
- 327th Fighter Group, 25 August 1942 – 10 April 1944 (attached to the Philadelphia Fighter Wing, 15 September 1943 – 28 January 1944)
- 28th Air Division, 20 April 1953
- 566th Air Defense Group, 1 February 1954 – 18 August 1955
- 327th Fighter Group, 18 August 1955 – 25 June 1966

=== Stations ===
- Mitchel Field, New York, 25 August 1942
- Richmond Army Air Base, Virginia, 25 August 1942
- Millville Army Air Field, New Jersey, 18 September 1943
- Richmond Army Air Base, Virginia, 8 January 1944
- Norfolk Army Air Field, Virginia, 16 February – 10 April 1944
- Travis Air Force Base, California, 20 April 1953
- Hamilton Air Force Base, California, 10 February 1954 – 18 August 1955
- Truax Field, Wisconsin, 18 August 1955 – 25 June 1966

=== Aircraft ===
- Curtiss P-40 Warhawk, 1942–1943
- Republic P-47 Thunderbolt, 1943–1944
- Lockheed T-33A-1-LO Shooting Star, 1954
- North American F-86D Sabre, 1953–1957
- Convair F-102 Delta Dagger, 1957–1966
