= 61st Fighter Squadron =

US Air Force unit

61st Fighter Squadron

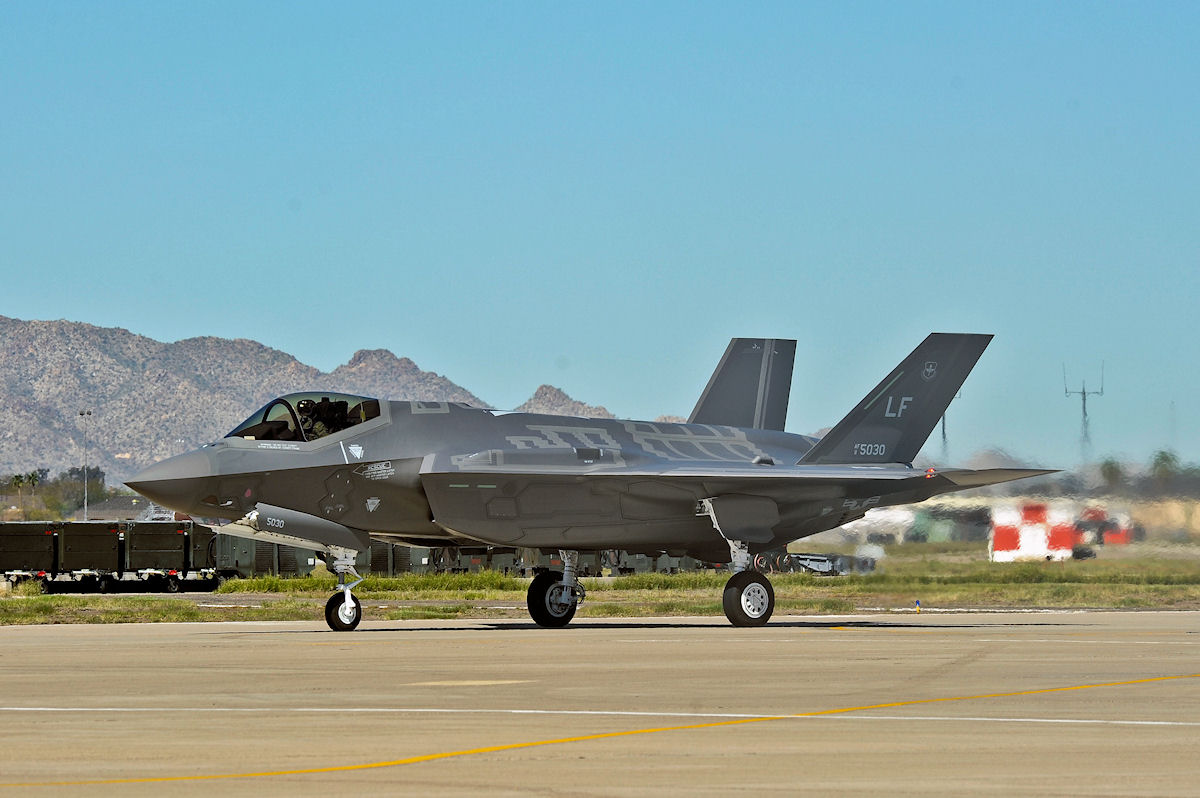
- A 61st Fighter Squadron F-35A Lightning II arrives at Luke AFB, April 2014
- Active: 1941–1945; 1946–1960; 1975–1993; 1994–2010; 2013–present
- Country: United States
- Branch: United States Air Force
- Type: Fighter Training
- Part of: Air Combat Command
- Garrison/HQ: Luke Air Force Base
- Nickname: Top Dogs
- Engagements: EAME Theater World War II

- Decorations: Distinguished Unit Citation; Air Force Outstanding Unit Award

Commanders
- Notable commanders: Loren G. McCollom; Gabby Gabreski; Michael Ryan; Donavon F. Smith

Insignia
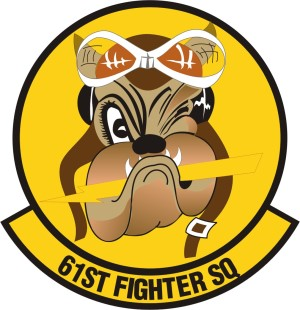
- 61st Fighter Squadron emblem (approved 15 September 1943)

The 61st Fighter Squadron is an active United States Air Force unit, assigned to the 56th Operations Group, at Luke Air Force Base, Arizona. It operates the F-35 Lightning II aircraft, conducting Pilot training.

The 61st, known as the 'Top Dogs', fly F-35A aircraft, to train instructor pilots and initial qualification pilots for Air Combat Command assignments.

== History ==
=== World War II ===
see 56th Operations Group for more of the squadron's World War II history

The 61st Fighter Squadron was constituted as the 61st Pursuit Squadron as part of the 56th Pursuit Group at Savannah, Georgia, on 15 January 1941. The squadron immediately began training for its wartime missions under III Fighter Command, rapidly transitioning through the Seversky P-35, Curtiss P-36 Hawk, Bell P-39 Airacobra and Curtiss P-40 Warhawk aircraft. On 7 December 1941, the 61st stepped up to defend the Southeastern United States from anticipated enemy air attack while it converted to the Republic P-47 Thunderbolt aircraft and prepared to deploy overseas.

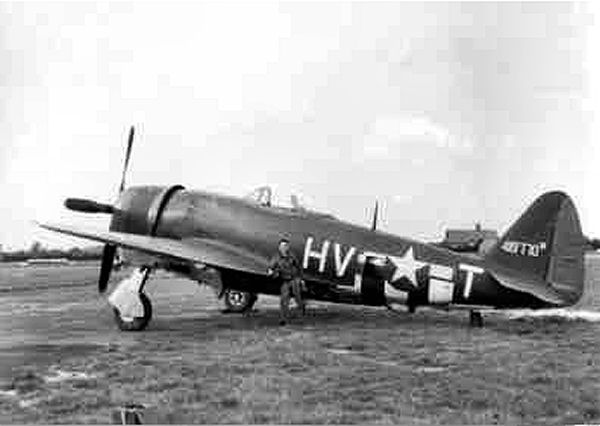
P-47 of the 61st Fighter Squadron

It was redesignated 61st Fighter Squadron on 15 May 1942, and deployed to RAF Kings Cliffe (AAF-367), England on 9 January 1943. It was declared operationally ready two months later and flew its first combat missions 13 April. The squadron was given fuselage code "HV" and operated from several RAF stations during the war, flying the P-47C Thunderbolt as an VIII Fighter Command bomber-escort unit initially for B-17 Flying Fortresses and beginning in 1944 for B-24 Liberators attacking enemy targets in Occupied Europe. From 1943 to 1945, the 61st produced 19 aces, the highest of any squadron in Europe, destroying 248 aircraft in the air and 67.5 aircraft on the ground. In 1944, it was recognized as the first fighter squadron in the European theater to score over 100 victories. Zwarte zaterdag: on 5 August 1944 8 planes of the 61st squadron attacked a passenger train near the Dutch village Beilen (Drenthe). After at least 6 attacks the train was destroyed, 141 Dutch civilians were (severely) injured, and 43 Dutch people, including children, were killed. After the end of the war in Europe, the squadron demobilized in England, and was inactivated as an administrative unit on 18 October 1945.

=== Cold War ===
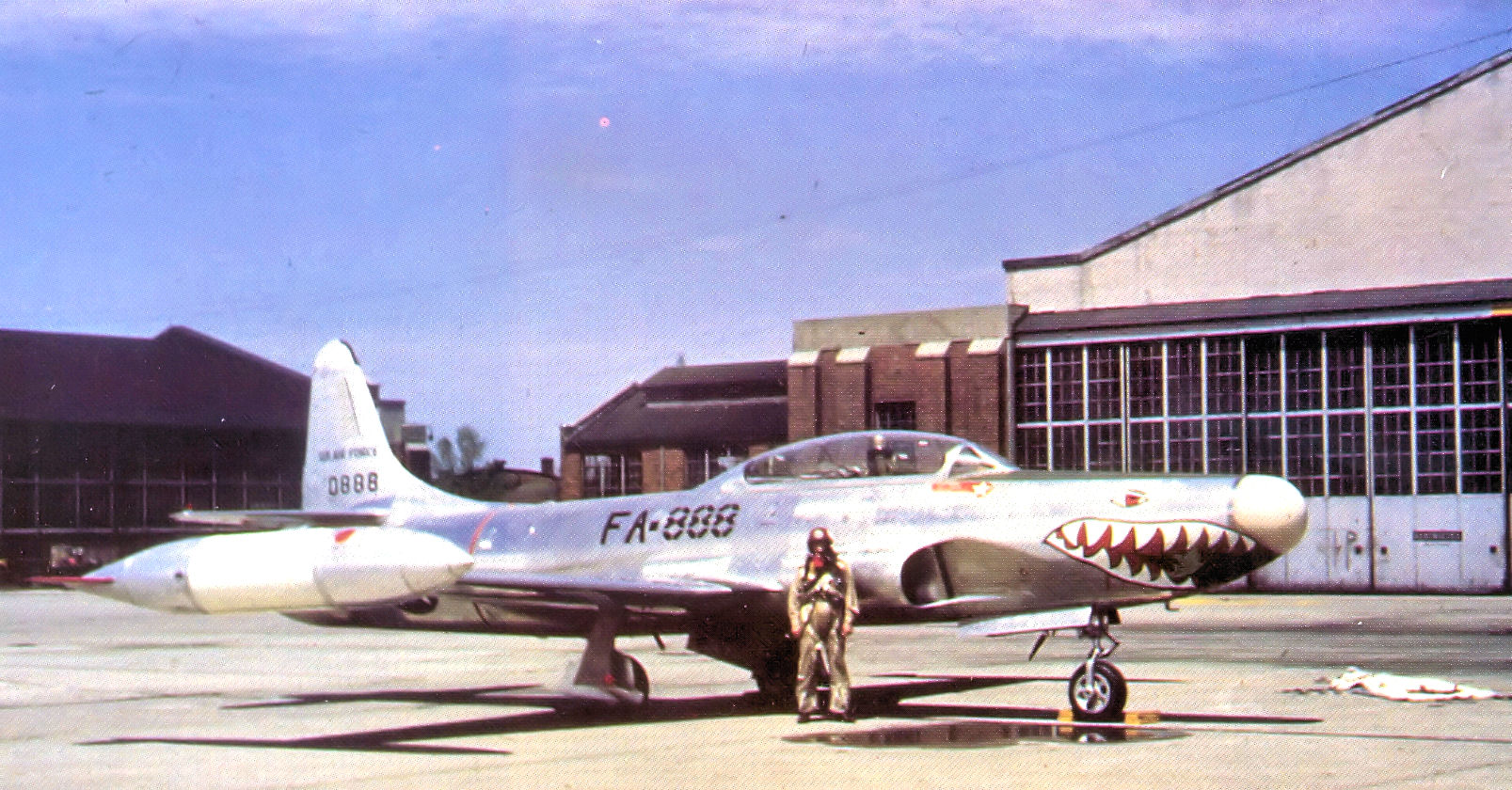
61st FIS F-94B 50-0888 at Selfridge AFB, about 1951

The squadron was reactivated on 1 May 1946 as a Strategic Air Command escort fighter group, being assigned to Fifteenth Air Force at Selfridge Army Air Base, Michigan. Initially equipped with P-47D Thunderbolts, being replaced with long-range P-51H Mustangs, originally developed for Twentieth Air Force bomber escort missions in the Pacific Theater. The mission of the squadron was to provide fighter escort of SAC's B-29 Superfortress bombers on intercontinental strategic bombardment missions, deploying to Alaska and Europe in this role. In 1947, the squadron was upgraded to Lockheed P-80C Shooting Stars, as SAC introduced the B-50 in the late 1940s. The squadron trained to maintain proficiency as a mobile strike force; including bomber escort mission until transferred from Strategic Air Command to Continental Air Command on 1 Dec 1948.

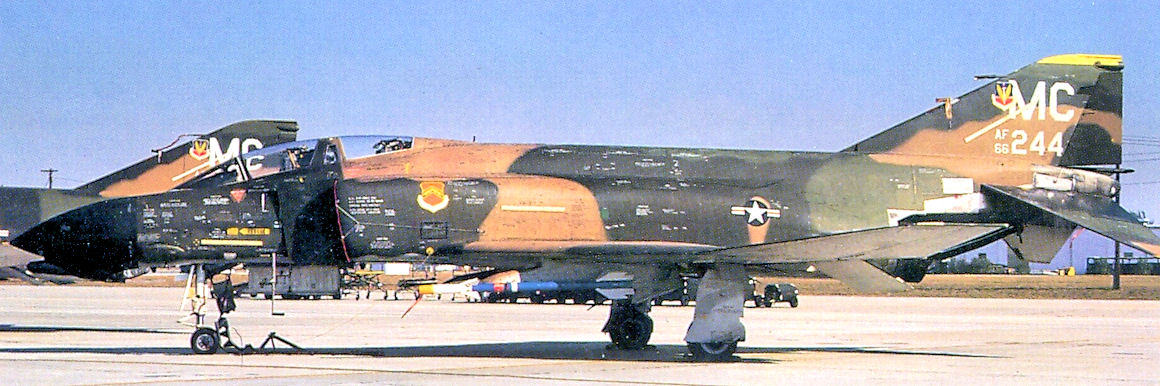
McDonnell F-4D-29-MC Phantom Serial 66-0244 of the 61st TFS.

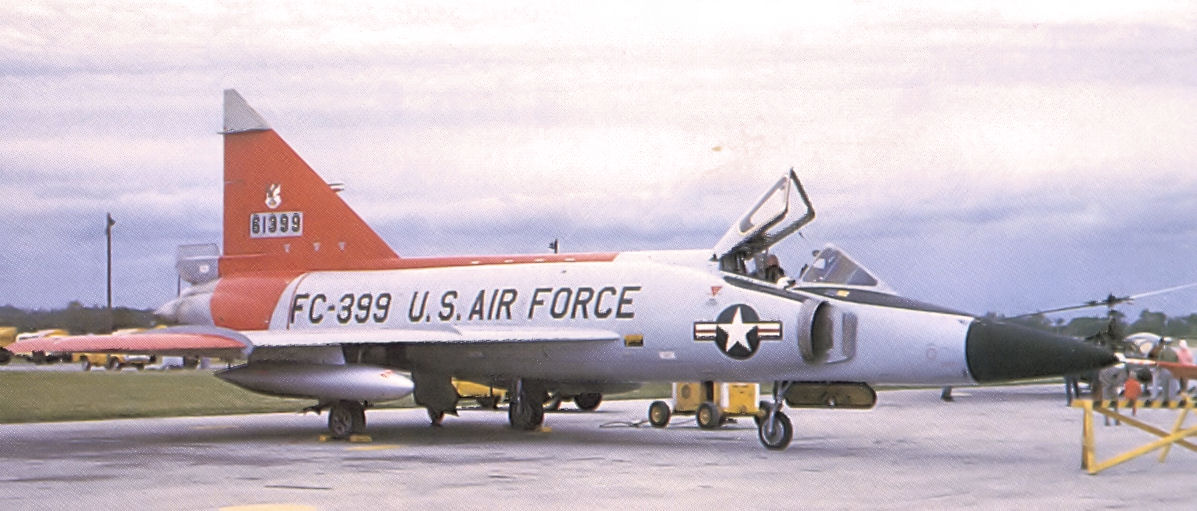
Convair F-102A-75-CO Delta Dagger 56-1399, about 1958

With the reassignment to ConAC, the squadron began performing air defense missions and being re-equipped with the F-86A Sabre. The squadron was re-designated as the 63d Fighter-Interceptor Squadron on 20 Jan 1950. In April 1950, the 61st transitioned to the F-94 modified with radar, operated by a RO (Radar Observer) to serve as an All Weather fighter Interceptor.

It was assigned to Air Defense Command 4708th Defense Wing in February 1952. In 1953 the Squadron was relocate to Ernest Harmon AFB in Newfoundland where it became part of the DEW (Defense Early Warning) system. The F-94 all weather fighter interceptors were later replaced with the F-89 all weather fighter interceptors. In 1957 the squadron was relocated to Truax Field. The 61st transitioned to the F-80 Shooting Star and later was the first squadron to fly the F-86 Sabre. The 61st was inactivated on 25 July 1960, at Truax Field, Wisconsin flying the F-102 Delta Dagger.

When the 56th Tactical Fighter Wing took over from the 1st TFW at MacDill AFB, Florida in June 1975, the 61st was reactivated, assuming the assets of the 27th Tactical Fighter Squadron flying the F-4E Phantom II. Its mission was to train pilots and weapons systems officers. Changed equipment to the F-4D in 1978, sending the "E" models to operational squadrons.

In April 1980, the flying mission changed to the F-16 Fighting Falcon. During this conversion the squadron was redesignated the 61st Tactical Fighter Training Squadron which better reflected its training role even though that did not change even from the Phantom days. In April 1989 the squadron began a transition to the F-16C/D block 30 big inlet F-16.

=== Modern era ===
On 1 November 1991, the host 56th Tactical Training Wing at MacDill implemented the Objective organization plan, and the subsequent re-designation of units led to the 61st becoming simply the 61st Fighter Squadron, and being assigned to the new 56th Operations Group. The end of the Cold War led to the BRAC commissions, and the downsizing of the Air Force to a smaller organization. As a result, it was decided first to close MacDill AFB, although under political pressure later it was realigned to a new mission.

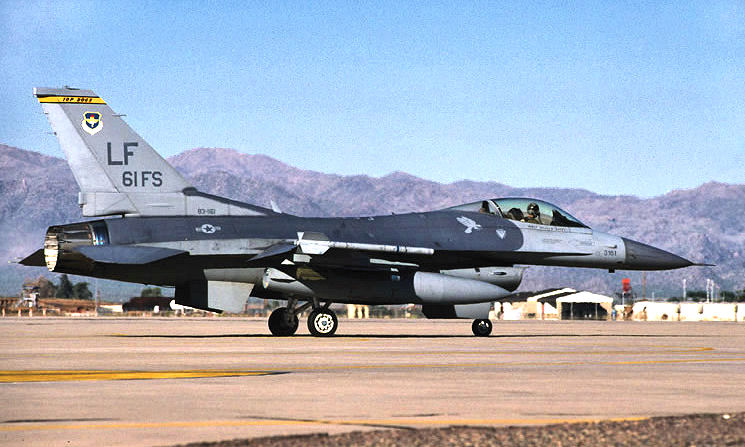
61st FS F-16C Block 25B 83-1161

Like its two sister squadrons, the 62d and 63d FS, the 61st Fighter Squadron was reassigned to Luke AFB, Arizona flying Block 25 F-16C/Ds. When the squadron moved to Luke AFB, Arizona, the squadron continued in its duties in a training role as Luke AFB became the primary F-16 training unit for the United States Air Force.

In February 2008, it was announced that due to BRAC 2005, Luke AFB give up twenty-five block 25 F-16s. It was decided that the 63d Fighter Squadron would inactivate and transfer its Block 42s to the 61st FS, and which, due to its seniority and historical heritage, would remain active. The first block 25 F-16s left Luke AFB in November 2008 with oldest and highest airframe hour aircraft leaving first, although as the squadron received the Block 42s, some 61st FS block 25s did go to the other Luke AFB block 25 squadrons. Nevertheless, the 61st FS was eventually marked for inactivation in early 2010. It was inactivated on 27 August 2010 in spite of converting to the block 42. A four-ship fly-by marked the occasion and beach-themed party followed to mark the occasion.

On 27 October 2013 the 61st Fighter Squadron was reactivated. It is the first Luke AFB squadron to take up the F-35A training mission.

== Lineage ==
- Constituted as the 61st Pursuit Squadron (Interceptor) on 20 Nov 1940

Activated on 15 January 1941
Redesignated 61st Pursuit Squadron (Interceptor) (Twin Engine) on 31 January 1942
Redesignated 61st Fighter Squadron (Twin Engine) on 15 May 1942
Redesignated 61st Fighter Squadron on 1 June 1942
Redesignated 61st Fighter Squadron, Single Engine on 28 February 1944
Inactivated on 18 October 1945

- Activated on 1 May 1946

Redesignated 61st Fighter Squadron, Jet Propelled on 24 April 1947
Redesignated 61st Fighter Squadron, Jet on 14 June 1948
Redesignated 61st Fighter-Interceptor Squadron on 20 January 1950
Discontinued and inactivated on 25 July 1960

- Redesignated 61st Tactical Fighter Squadron on 12 May 1975

Activated on 30 June 1975
Redesignated 61st Tactical Fighter Training Squadron on 1 January 1980
Redesignated 61st Fighter Squadron on 1 November 1991
Inactivated on 12 August 1993

- Activated on 1 April 1994

Inactivated on 27 August 2010

- Activated on 25 October 2013

=== Assignments ===
- 56th Pursuit Group (later 56th Fighter Group), 15 January 1941 – 18 October 1945
- 56th Fighter Group (later 56th Fighter-Interceptor Group), 1 May 1946
- 4708th Defense Wing, 6 February 1952
- 575th Air Defense Group, 16 February 1953
- 64th Air Division, 6 August 1953
- 4731st Air Defense Group, 1 April 1957
- 327th Fighter Group, 15 October 1957 – 25 July 1960
- 56th Tactical Fighter Wing (later 56th Tactical Training Wing, 56 Fighter Wing), 30 June 1975
- 56th Operations Group, 1 November 1991 – 12 August 1993
- 56th Operations Group, 1 April 1994 - 30 September 2010
- 56th Operations Group, 27 October 2013 – present

=== Stations ===
- Army Air Base, Savannah, Georgia, 15 January 1941
- Charlotte Army Air Base, North Carolina, 26 May 1941 (deployed to Myrtle Beach Municipal Airport, October–November 1941)
- Charleston Municipal Airport, South Carolina, 10 December 1941
- Bridgeport Army Air Field, Connecticut, 15 January - 27 December 1942
- RAF Kings Cliffe (AAF-367), England, 12 January 1943
- RAF Horsham St Faith (AAF-123), England, 5 April 1943
- RAF Halesworth (AAF-365), England, 9 July 1943
- RAF Boxted (AAF-150), England, 19 April 1944
- RAF Little Walden (AAF-165), England, c. 15 September - 11 October 1945
- Camp Kilmer, New Jersey, 16–18 October 1945
- Selfridge Field (later Selfridge Air Force Base), Michigan, 1 May 1946 – 25 July 1953
- Ernest Harmon Air Force Base, Newfoundland, 6 August 1953
- Truax Field, Wisconsin, 17 October 1957 – 25 July 1960
- MacDill Air Force Base, Florida, 30 June 1975 - 12 August 1993
- Luke Air Force Base, Arizona, 1 April 1994 – 30 September 2010
- Luke Air Force Base, Arizona, 25 October 2013 – present

=== Aircraft ===
- Seversky P-35 (1941)
- Curtiss P-36 Hawk (1941)
- Bell P-39 Airacobra (1941–1942)
- Curtiss P-40 Warhawk (1941–1942)
- Republic P-47 Thunderbolt (1942–1945, 1946–1947)
- North American P-51 Mustang (1946–1947)
- Lockheed F-80 Shooting Star (1947–1950)
- North American F-86 Sabre (1950–1951)
- Lockheed F-94B Starfire (1951–1954)
- Northrop F-89D Scorpion (1954–1957)
- Convair F-102 Delta Dagger (1957–1960)
- McDonnell F-4 Phantom II (1975–1979)
- General Dynamics F-16 Fighting Falcon (1980–1993, 1994–2010)
- Lockheed Martin F-35A Lightning II (2013-)
