= 456th Fighter-Interceptor Squadron =

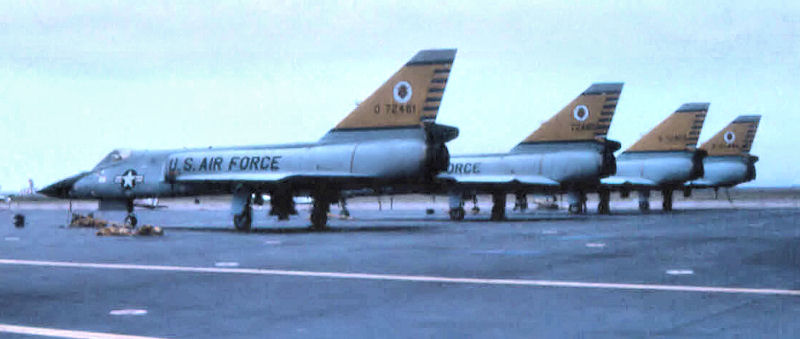
- Three F-106s Castle AFB, about 1966 with the squadron emblem on their tails
- Active: 1944–1946; 1954–1955; 1955–1968
- Country: United States
- Branch: United States Air Force
- Role: Air Defense
- Engagements: Pacific Ocean Theater
- Decorations: Air Force Outstanding Unit Award

Insignia
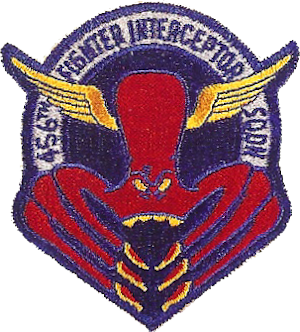
- Patch with 456th Fighter-Interceptor Squadron emblem approved 21 March 1945)

The 456th Fighter-Interceptor Squadron is an inactive United States Air Force unit. Its last assignment was with the Air Defense Command San Francisco Air Defense Sector stationed at Oxnard Air Force Base, California. It was inactivated on 18 July 1968.

== History ==
=== World War II ===
It was established in late 1944 as a very long range Republic P-47N Thunderbolt fighter squadron. It trained under III Fighter Command. The 456th was deployed to Pacific Theater of Operations, and assigned to XXI Bomber Command as a long-range escort squadron for B-29 Superfortress bombers engaged in the strategic bombardment of Japan, based on Iwo Jima. After the Japanese capitulation, it was moved to Luzon where the squadron was demobilized; the P-47Ns were returned to storage depots in the United States. It was inactivated as a paper unit in 1946.

=== Cold War Air Defense ===
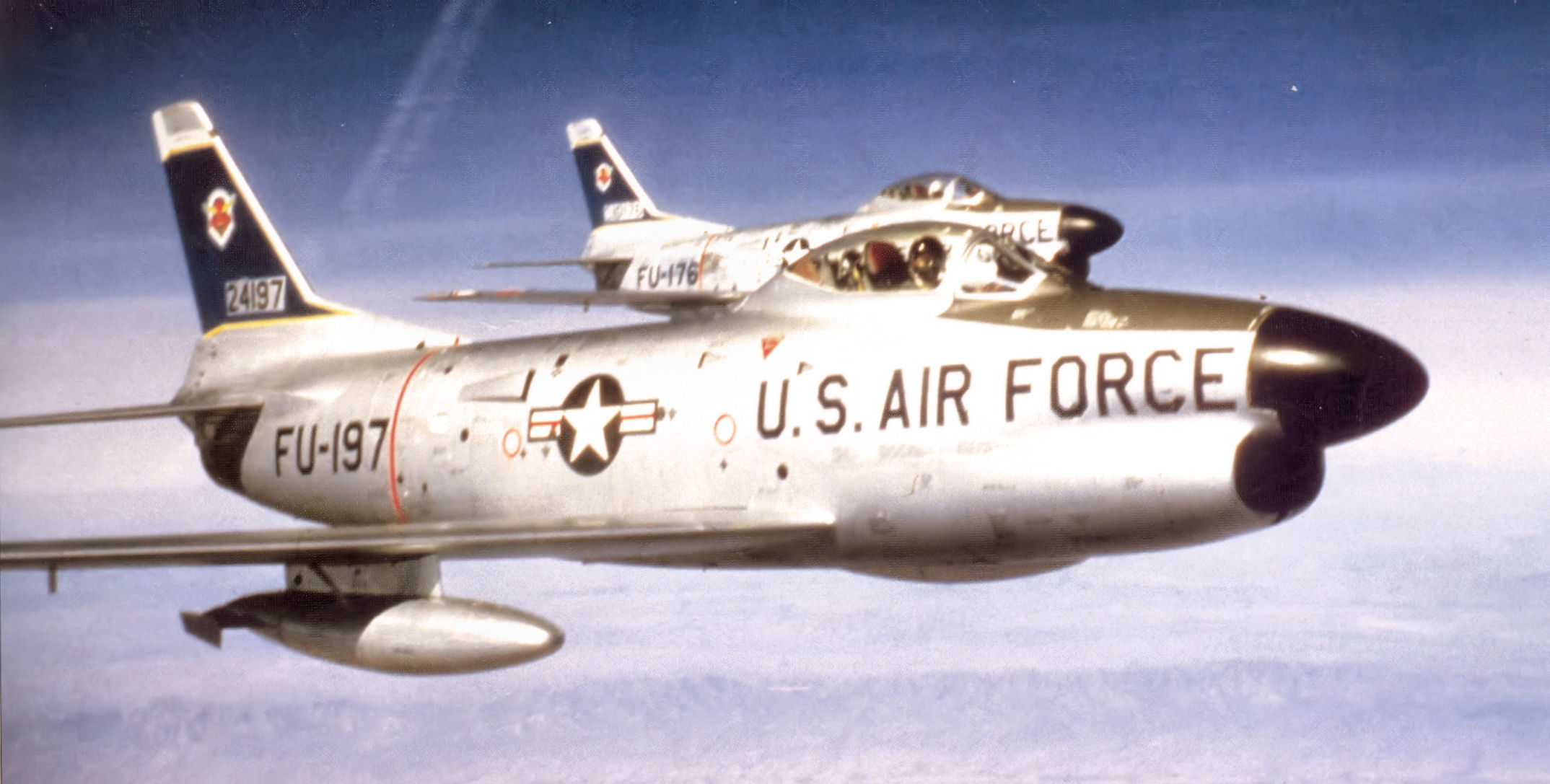
456th FIS North American F-86L Sabres at Castle AFB, California, February 1958

It was reactivated in 1954 under Air Defense Command as an air defense interceptor squadron, and stationed at Truax Field, Wisconsin for the air defense of the Great Lakes. It was equipped with North American F-86D Sabres. In August 1955 the unit was inactivated, and was reactivated at Castle Air Force Base, California in October 1955 with North American F-86D Sabres. In 1957 it began re-equipping with the North American North American F-86L Sabre, an improved version of the F-86D which incorporated the Semi Automatic Ground Environment, or SAGE computer-controlled direction system for intercepts. The service of the F-86L was brief, since by the time the last F-86L conversion was delivered, the type was already being phased out in favor of supersonic interceptors.

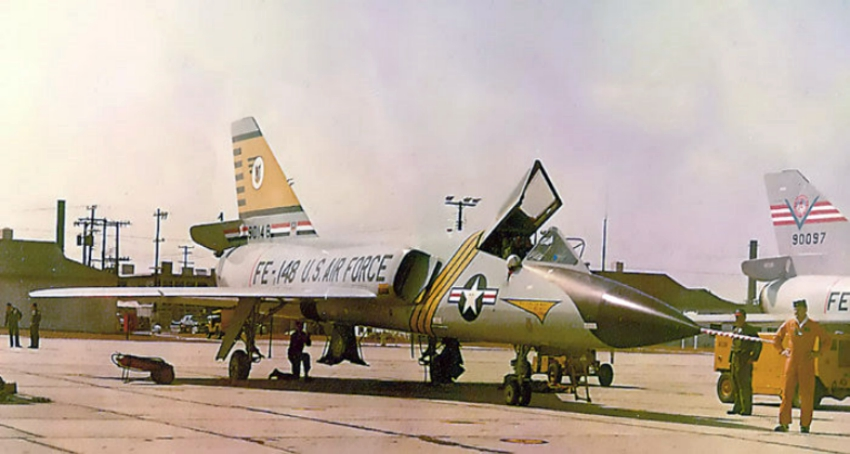
Squadron F-106A Delta Dart (Note: Aircraft is Convair F-106A Delta Dart, serial 59-148. This photo was taken at Tyndall Air Force Base, Florida during the 1961 William Tell meet.)

The squadron upgraded in June 1958 into supersonic Convair F-102A Delta Daggers. In September 1959 it received Convair F-106 Delta Darts.

On 22 October 1962, before President John F. Kennedy told Americans that missiles were in place in Cuba, the squadron dispersed one third of its force, equipped with nuclear tipped missiles to Fresno Air Terminal at the start of the Cuban Missile Crisis. These planes returned to Castle after the crisis.

The squadron moved to Oxnard Air Force Base, California on 18 July 1968 and was inactivated the same day, transferring its mission, personnel and equipment to the 437th Fighter-Interceptor Squadron.

== Lineage ==
- Constituted as the 456th Fighter Squadron on 5 October 1944

Activated on 15 October 1944
Inactivated on 25 August 1946

- Redesignated 456th Fighter-Interceptor Squadron on 23 March 1953

Activated on 8 August 1954
Inactivated on 18 August 1955

- Activated on 18 October 1955

Inactivated on 18 July 1968

=== Assignments ===
- 414th Fighter Group, 15 October 1944 – 25 August 1946
- 520th Air Defense Group, 8 August 1954 – 18 August 1955
- 28th Air Division, 18 October 1955
- San Francisco Air Defense Sector, 1 July 1960 – 18 July 1968

=== Stations ===
- Seymour Johnson Field, North Carolina, 15 October 1944
- Selfridge Field, Michigan, 21 November 1944
- Bluethenthal Field, North Carolina, 19 March – 5 June 1945
- North Field, Iwo Jima, 7 July 1945
- Clark Field, Luzon, Philippines, 23 December 1945
- Floridablanca Airfield, Luzon, Philippines, unknown-25 August 1946
- Truax Field, Wisconsin, 8 August 1954 – 18 August 1955 (Note: Maurer incorrectly lists the squadron's station as George Air Force Base, California during this time. Maurer, Combat Squadrons, p. 562.)
- Castle Air Force Base, California, 18 October 1955 – 18 July 1968
- Oxnard Air Force Base, California, 18 July 1968

=== Aircraft ===
- Republic P-47 Thunderbolt, 1944–1946
- North American F-86D Sabre, 1954–1955; 1955–1957
- North American F-86L Sabre, 1957–1958
- Convair F-102 Delta Dagger, 1958–1959
- Convair F-106 Delta Dart, 1959–1968
