= Truax Field Air National Guard Base =

Military facility

- Madison, Wisconsin in the United States
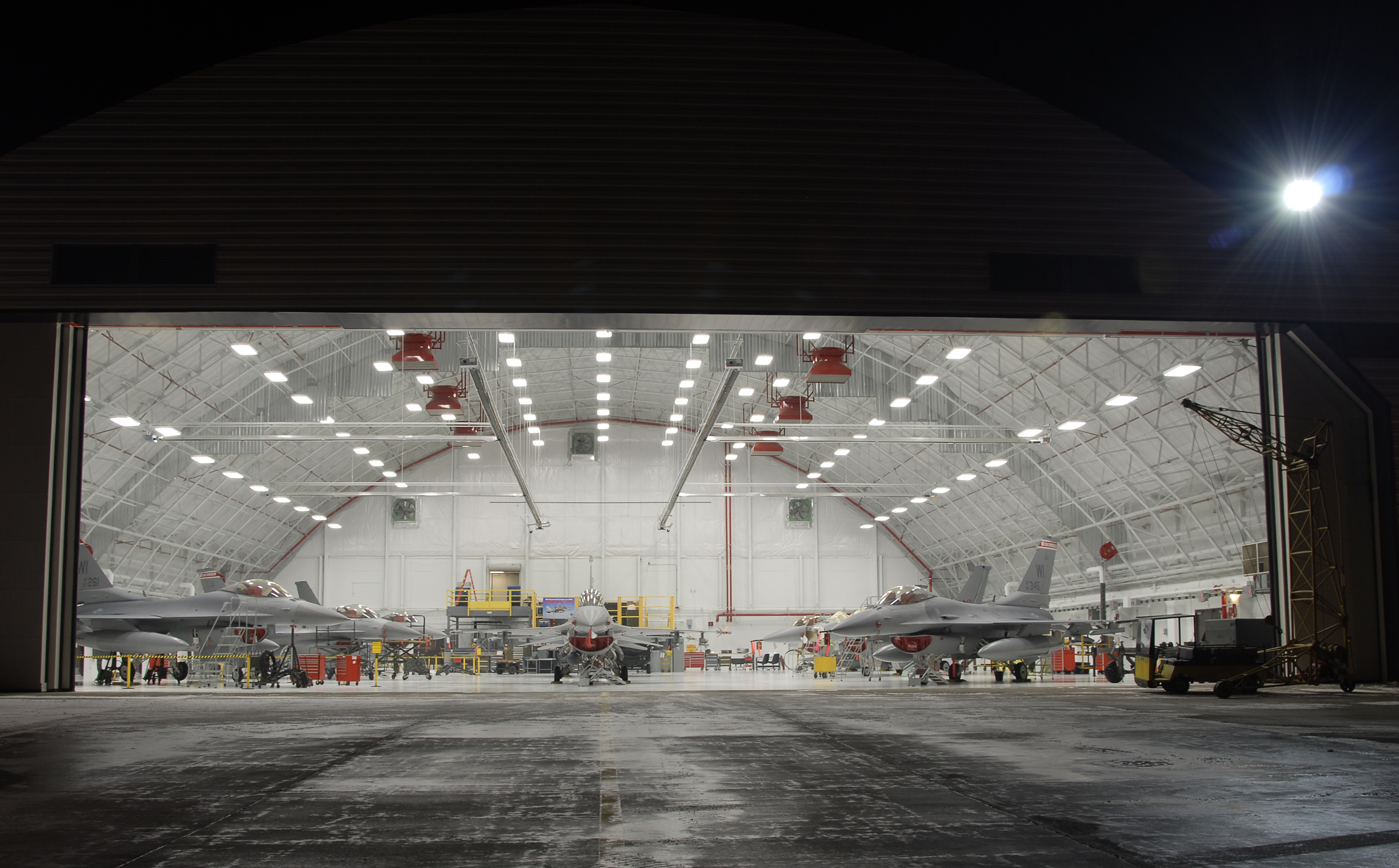
- F-16 Fighting Falcons assigned to the 115th Fighter Wing of the Wisconsin Air National Guard in a hangar at Truax Field ANGB.

Site information
- Type: Air National Guard Base
- Owner: Department of Defense
- Operator: US Air Force (USAF)
- Controlled by: Wisconsin Air National Guard (ANG)
- Condition: Operational
- Website: www.115fw.ang.af.mil

Location
- Coordinates: 43°08′23″N 089°20′15″W

Site history
- Built: 1942 (as Madison Army Airfield)
- In use: 1942 – present 1946

Garrison information
- Garrison: 115th Fighter Wing (host)

Airfield information
- Identifiers: IATA: MSN, ICAO: KMSN, FAA LID: MSN, WMO: 726410
- Elevation: 270.3 meters (887 ft) AMSL
Runways
Direction	Length and surface
18/36	2,745 meters (9,006 ft) Concrete
3/21	2,194.5 meters (7,200 ft) Concrete
14/32	1,781.8 meters (5,846 ft) Concrete
- Airfield shared with Dane County Regional Airport. Source: Federal Aviation Administration

Truax Field Air National Guard Base (IATA: MSN, ICAO: KMSN, FAA LID: MSN), also known as Truax Field, is a military facility located at Dane County Regional Airport. It is located five miles (8 km) northeast of the center of Madison, a city in Dane County, Wisconsin, United States.

Truax Field was named in honor of Wisconsin native Lieutenant Thomas L. Truax, who was killed in a P-40 training accident in November 1941.

The airport is home to both the Wisconsin Army National Guard and the Wisconsin Air National Guard.

== History ==
Originally known as Madison Army Airfield, Truax Field was activated as an Army Air Forces airfield in June 1942 during World War II. During the war it was used by the Army Air Force Eastern Technical Training Center, a major school operating at Truax AAF for training radio operators and mechanics, and later expanded to training in radar operations, control tower operations and other communications fields for the Army Airways Communication Service. A special unit established in 1943 trained radio operators and mechanics on B-29 Superfortress communications equipment. The host unit on the airfield was the 334th (later 3508th) Army Air Force Base Unit. On 17 September 1945, the airfield's mission was changed to that of a separation center, and it was closed as an active AAF airfield on 30 November 1945.

Conveyed to local civilian authorities, the "Madison Municipal Airport" also became the home of the Wisconsin Air National Guard and its present-day 115th Fighter Wing (115 FW), an Air National Guard fighter wing operationally-gained by the Air Combat Command (ACC) and which still operates from the base, flying the F-35A Lightning II.

Reactivated by the United States Air Force on 1 February 1952 and renamed Truax Air Force Base, the installation was brought up to active duty status during the Korean War as an Air Defense Command (ADC) fighter-interceptor base. The initial USAF unit assigned to Truax was the 78th Air Base Squadron. ADC assigned Truax AFB to its Central Air Defense Force and activated the Wisconsin Air National Guard's 128th Fighter-Interceptor Group, normally based in Milwaukee. The 128th FIG flew F-80 Shooting Stars from Truax until returning to Milwaukee in February 1952.

After some construction of additional runways, taxiways, aprons and support facilities, the 78th Fighter-Interceptor Group with its 432d and 433d Fighter-Interceptor Squadrons arrived on 1 November 1952, replacing the 78th ABS as the host operating unit at Truax. The 78th was reassigned from Hamilton AFB, California and flew the F-86 Sabre and F-89 Scorpion aircraft in a fighter-interceptor role.

On 9 April 1955, Truax AFB became the headquarters of ADC's 37th Air Division (Defense). The 37th AD was responsible for the air defense of parts of Wisconsin, Illinois, and Indiana, including Chicago. On 1 April 1959, ADC's 30th Air Division, operating the Semi Automatic Ground Environment (SAGE) system, replaced the 37th AD. The 30th was a command and control organization responsible for radar coverage of the midwest using the Semi Automatic Ground Environment (SAGE) automated control system for tracking and intercepting enemy bomber aircraft. SAGE, in later versions, could also automatically direct aircraft to an interception by sending commands directly to the aircraft's autopilot.

In the late 1950s, the aircraft assigned to the base changed to the F-102 Delta Dagger and the 78th was replaced by the 327th Fighter-Interceptor Group, which arrived in 1956, replacing the 78th. The 327th's squadrons were the 61st, 323d and 325th Fighter-Interceptor Squadrons.

In 1966, Headquarters, 30th Air Division, was reassigned to Sioux City Municipal Airport, Iowa, and the 20th Air Division replaced it at Truax. The 20th AD was responsible for air defense of parts of Wisconsin, Minnesota, Iowa, Missouri, Arkansas, Tennessee, Kentucky, Indiana, and all of Illinois. It also supervised Air National Guard units that flew interception sorties using, among others, the F-101 Voodoo and F-106 Delta Dart aircraft, while at the same time controlling numerous ground-based USAF radar squadrons.

By the late 1960s, the need for air defense against crewed aircraft was diminishing and the renamed Aerospace Defense Command (ADC) was consolidating and drawing down its forces. On 31 December 1967, the 20th AD was reassigned to Fort Lee AFS, Virginia and Truax AFB was deactivated as an active Aerospace Defense Command base in early 1968. Those portions of Truax AFB not reverting to civilian control were turned over to the Wisconsin Air National Guard as Truax Field Air National Guard Base and Dane County Regional Airport/Truax Field has been a joint military/civil airport ever since.

Truax Field ANGB remains the home installation of the 115th Fighter Wing (115 FW), an Air National Guard unit operationally gained by the Air Combat Command (ACC), formerly flying the Lockheed F-16 Fighting FalconC/D multi-role fighter aircraft. The 115 FW has two distinct missions. The Federal mission under Title 10 USC is to staff and train flying and support units to augment Air Combat Command general purpose fighter forces to effectively and rapidly project F-16 combat power anywhere in the world to perform wartime or peacetime missions as well as operations other than war. The 115 FW maintains mobilization readiness as part of the Air Reserve Component (ARC) and conducts training as directed by ACC. The State mission under Title 32 USC is to provide trained and equipped units to protect life and property and to preserve peace, order, and public safety as directed by the Governor of Wisconsin.

== ADC units assigned ==
- 20th Air Division, 1 April 1966 – 31 December 1967
- 30th Air Division, 1 April 1959 – 1 April 1966
- 37th Air Division, 8 September 1955 – 1 April 1959
- Chicago Air Defense Sector, 8 March 1957 – 1 April 1966
- 128th Fighter-Interceptor Wing (Federalized Wisconsin ANG), 16 February 1951 – 6 February 1952
- 128th Air Base Group, 10 February 1951 – 6 February 1952
- 128th Fighter-Interceptor Group, 16 February 1951 – 6 February 1952
- 520th Air Defense Group, 16 February 1953

Re-designated: 327th Fighter Group (Air Defense), 18 August 1955 – 25 June 1966

- 61st Fighter-Interceptor Squadron, 1 November 1957 – 25 July 1960 (F-86D, F-102)
- 128th Fighter-Interceptor Squadron, 10 April 1951 – 1 December 1952 (F-80A, F-86F)
- 176th Fighter-Interceptor Squadron, 16 February 1951 – 1 November 1952 (F-51D)
- 323d Fighter-Interceptor Squadron, 18 August 1955 – 1 October 1957 (F-86D)
- 325th Fighter-Interceptor Squadron, 18 August 1955 – 25 June 1966 (F-86D, F-102)
- 432d Fighter-Interceptor Squadron, 1 December 1952 – 18 August 1955 (F-86F)
- 433d Fighter-Interceptor Squadron, 1 November 1952 – 20 July 1954 (F-89C)
- 456th Fighter-Interceptor Squadron, 8 August 1954 – 18 August 1955 (F-86D)
- 639th Aircraft Control and Warning Squadron, 1 December 1956 – 1 July 1957

== 2020s ==
In April 2020, the Air Force announced that the F-35A Lightning II would be based at Truax Field, with the 115th Fighter Wing receiving its first aircraft in 2023.

The 115 FW's last F-16 left Truax field in October 2022. The first three F-35As arrived in 25 April 2023.

== See also ==
- Wisconsin World War II Army Airfields
- Central (later Eastern) Technical Training Command
- List of USAF Aerospace Defense Command General Surveillance Radar Stations
