= 432d Fighter-Interceptor Squadron =

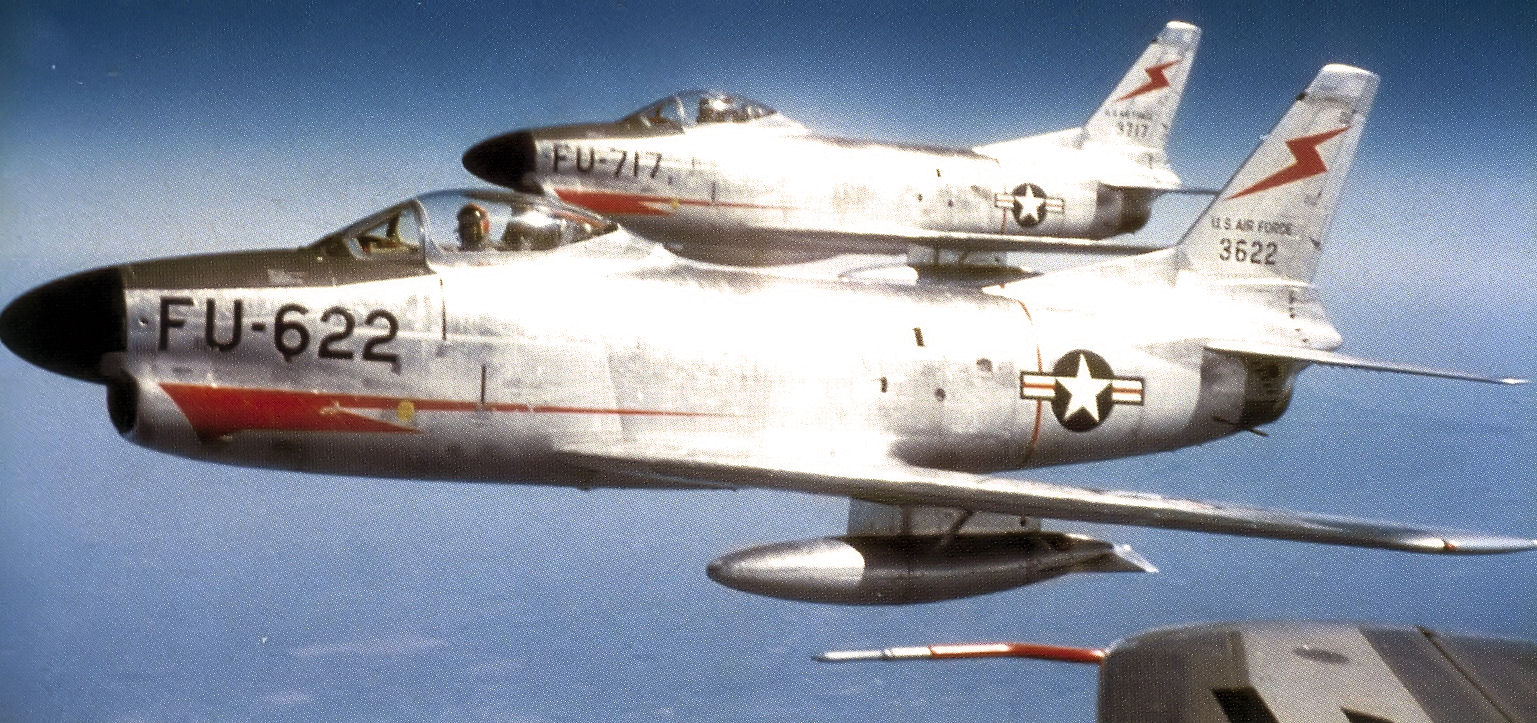
- F-86D Sabres at Truax Field (Note: Aircraft are North American F-86D-40-NA Sabres. Identified aircraft include serial numbers 52-3622 and 52-3717)
- Active: 1943–1949; 1952–1958
- Country: United States
- Branch: United States Air Force
- Role: Fighter-Interceptor
- Nickname: Clover (World War II)
- Decorations: Distinguished Unit Citation; Philippine Republic Presidential Unit Citation

Commanders
- Notable commanders: Captain (later Colonel) John S. Loisel

Insignia
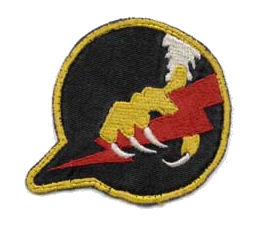
- Patch with 432d Fighter-Interceptor Squadron emblem (approved 9 March 1955)

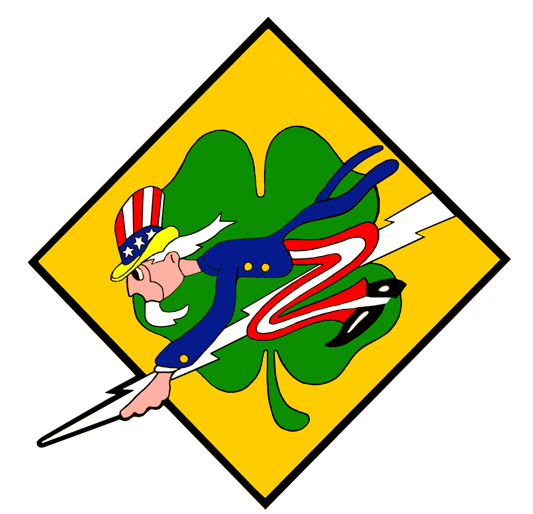
- 432d Fighter Squadron emblem

The 432d Fighter-Interceptor Squadron is an inactive United States Air Force unit. Its last assignment was with the 475th Fighter Group at Minneapolis-Saint Paul International Airport, Minnesota, where it was inactivated on 2 January 1958.

== History ==
=== World War II and Army of Occupation ===
Combat in Southwest Pacific and Western Pacific, 12 August 1943 – 21 July 1945. Occupation duty (Korea and Japan), 1945–1949.

=== Air defense operations ===
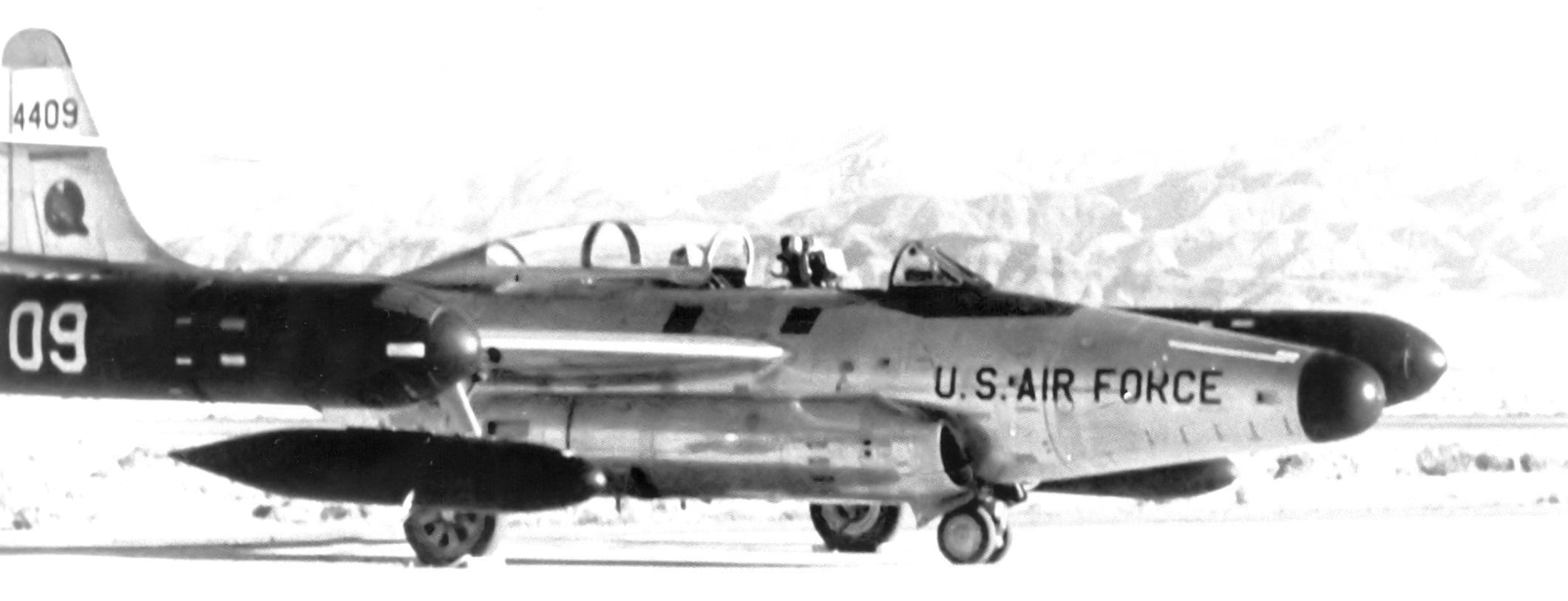
432d Fighter-Interceptor Squadron Northrop F-89H Scorpion (Note: Aircraft is Northrop F-89H-5-NO Scorpion serial 54-409, stationed at Minneapolis-Saint Paul International Airport, Minnesota. Taken at Indian Springs Air Force Auxiliary Field, Nevada, armed with a "Genie" nuclear missile. Aircraft fired the nuclear weapon as the "John Shot" of Operation Plumb Bob, 19 July 1959)

Air Defense of Upper Midwest, 1952–1958.

== Lineage ==
- Activated on 14 May 1943 by special authority prior to constitution as 432d Fighter Squadron on 15 May 1943

Inactivated on 1 April 1949

- Redesignated 432d Fighter-Interceptor Squadron on 10 October 1952

Activated on 1 December 1952
Inactivated on 2 January 1958

=== Assignments ===
- 475th Fighter Group, 14 May 1943 – 1 April 1949
- 31st Air Division, 1 December 1952
- 520th Air Defense Group, 16 February 1953
- 475th Fighter Group, 18 August 1955 – 2 January 1958

=== Stations ===
- Charters Towers, Australia, 14 May 1943
- RAAF Base Amberley, Australia, 11 June 1943
- Dobodura Airfield Complex, New Guinea, 14 August 1943

Operated from Port Moresby Airfield Complex, New Guinea, 12 August – 1 September 1943

- Nadzab Airfield Complex, New Guinea, 25 March 1944
- Hollandia Airfield Complex, New Guinea, 15 May 1944
- Mokmer Airfield, Biak, Netherlands East Indies, 12 July 1944
- Dulag Airfield, Leyte, 2 November 1944

Detachment operated from San Jose, Mindoro, Netherlands East Indies, 5 February – 2 March 1945

- Clark Field, Luzon, Philippines, 27 February 1945
- Lingayen Airfield, Luzon, Philippines, 19 April 1945
- Ie Shima Airfield, Okinawa, 8 August 1945
- Kimpo Air Base, Korea, 28 September 1945
- Itazuke Air Base, Japan, 28 August 1948
- Ashiya Air Base, Japan, 25 March – 1 April 1949
- Truax Field, Wisconsin, 10 October 1952
- Minneapolis-Saint Paul International Airport, Minnesota, 18 August 1955 – 2 January 1958

=== Aircraft ===
- Lockheed P-38 Lightning, 1943–1946
- North American P-51 Mustang, 1946–1949
- North American F-86D Sabre, 1952–1955
- Northrop F-89D Scorpion, 1955–1956
- Northrop F-89H Scorpion, 1956–1957
