= Sioux City Air National Guard Base =

Iowa Air National Guard base in Sioux City

- Near Sergeant Bluff, Iowa in United States
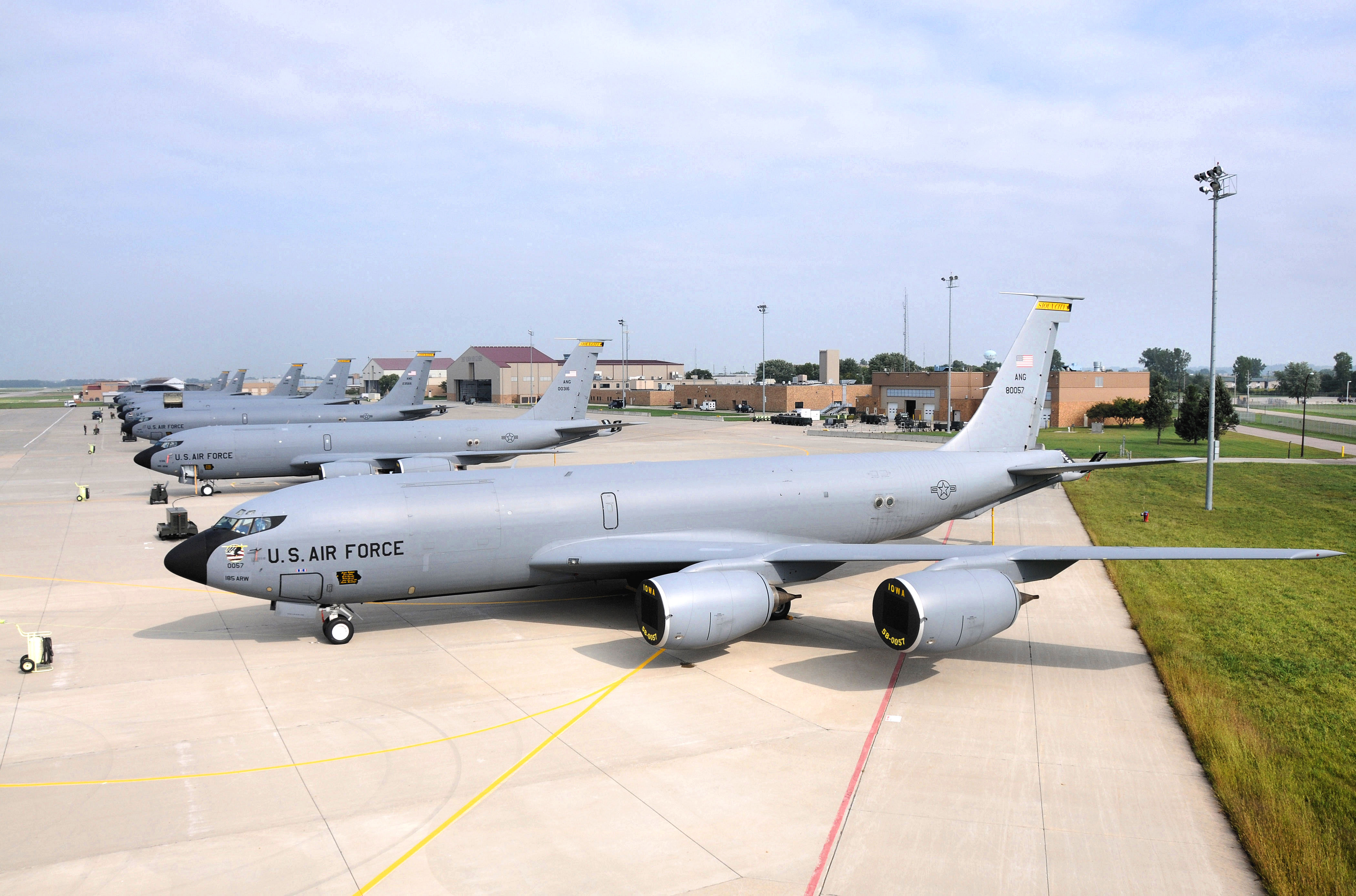
- Several KC-135R Stratotankers assigned to the 185th Air Refueling Wing of the Iowa Air National Guard parked on the ramp at Sioux City ANGB.

Site information
- Type: Air National Guard Base
- Owner: Department of Defense
- Operator: US Air Force (USAF)
- Controlled by: Iowa Air National Guard (ANG)
- Condition: Operational
- Website: www.185arw.ang.af.mil

Location
- Coordinates: 42°23′54″N 096°22′19″W

Site history
- Built: 1942 (as Sioux City Army Air Base)
- In use: 1942–1945 and 1946–present

Garrison information
- Garrison: 185th Air Refueling Wing (host)

Airfield information
- Identifiers: IATA: SUX, ICAO: KSUX, FAA LID: SUX, WMO: 725570
- Elevation: 334.6 metres (1,098 ft) AMSL
Runways
Direction	Length and surface
13/31	2,743.8 metres (9,002 ft) concrete
17/35	2,011.6 metres (6,600 ft) asphalt
- Airfield shared with Sioux Gateway Airport (Brigadier General Day Field).

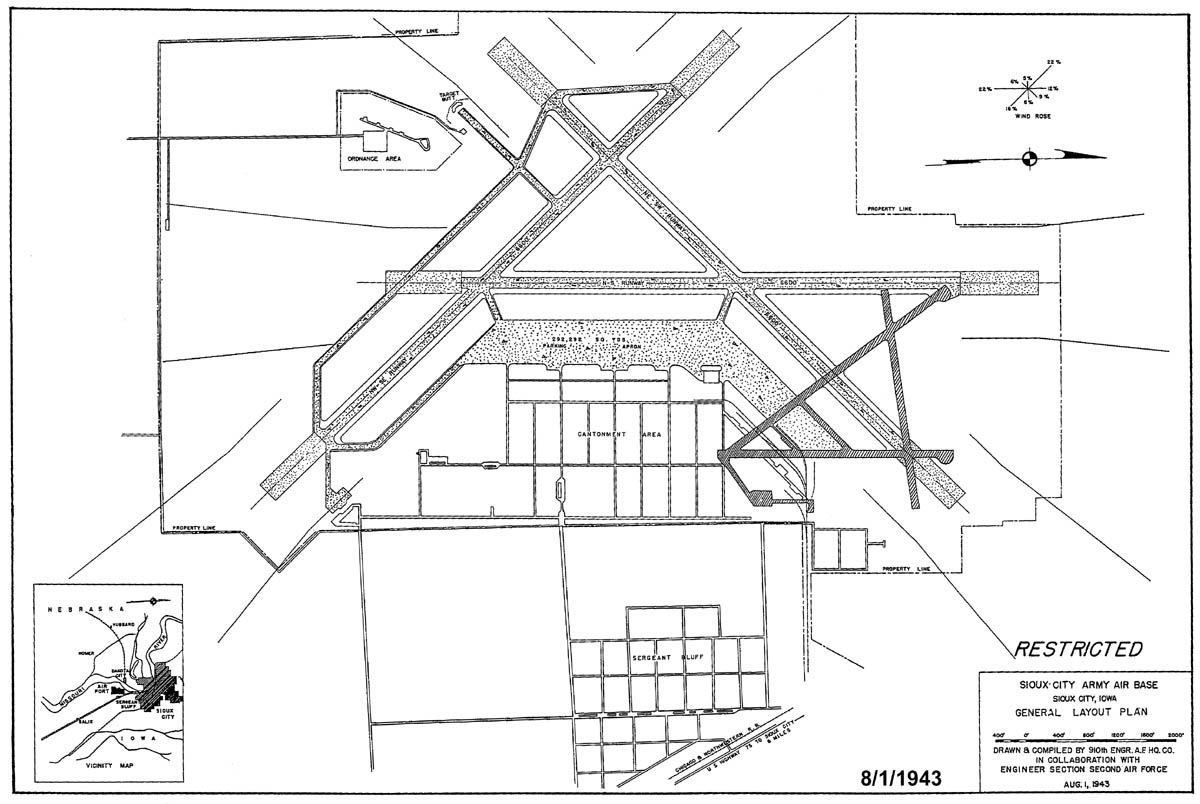
1944 Airfield Diagram

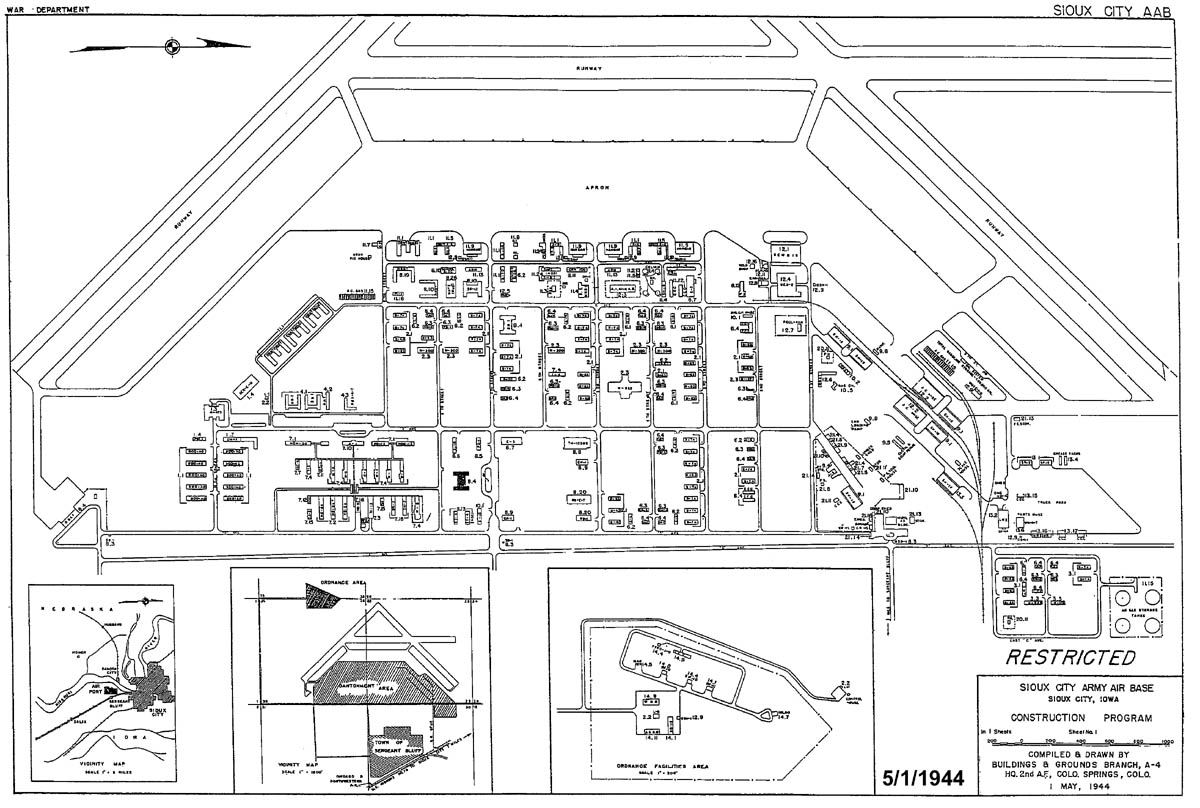
1944 Airfield Diagram

Sioux City Air National Guard Base is an Iowa Air National Guard base, located at Sioux Gateway Airport It is located 7.2 miles (11.6 km) south-southeast of Sioux City, Iowa. On 25 May 2002, the airport was named "Colonel Bud Day Field" in honor of United States Air Force Colonel George Everette "Bud" Day, a Sioux City, Iowa native and is the only person ever awarded both the Medal of Honor and the Air Force Cross.

== Overview ==
Sioux Gateway Regional Airport is home for the Iowa Air National Guard's 185th Air Refueling Wing. The wings main mission is to provide mid-air refueling and mobility sustainment in direct support of the global mission of the Air Force. As a community-based organization the wing and its subordinate units are also tasked to support the state of Iowa in the event of a state emergency.

== History ==
The station was established in March 1942 as Sioux City Army Air Base (AAB) and was a major training center during World War II under II Bomber Command for crew members of B-24 Liberators and B-17 Flying Fortresses. During the 1950s, the airfield was an Air Defense Command fighter-interceptor base. Beginning in 1956, the ADC flying activity was reduced and Sioux City became an ADC command and control station for Ground Control Intercept (GCI) Radar Stations in the Midwest, later becoming a Direction Center (DC-22) for the ADC Sioux City Air Defense Sector and later the 30th Air Division. In 1968, ADC closed its facilities with the Iowa Air National Guard becoming the host unit at the base.

=== World War II ===
Sioux City Army Air Field 1944 Classbook

The construction of Sioux City AAB began in March 1942, about three months after the Japanese attack on Pearl Harbor. Opened on 5 July 1942, it became a major training center during World War II, initially for B-17 Flying Fortress, and later B-24 Liberator groups. The base performed primarily Phase III advanced group training, and once completed, the groups were deployed overseas to either the Eighth Air Force (ETO), or Fifteenth Air Force (MTO) for combat operations.

The host unit at the base was the 354th Army Air Force Base Unit, and the major training organization was the 393d Combat Training School (later redesignated 224th Combat Crew Training School in 1944). At its peak, (October 1943) there were 940 officers and 5,183 enlisted men either assigned or attached to the base. The major training activities at Sioux City included aerial gunnery, bombardment, navigation, formation flying, and other related courses.

Initially training at the field was intended to prepare an entire bomb group for overseas combat (OTU – Operational Training). After July 1943, sufficient Bomb Groups had been formed and trained, and the base switched to training individual crews as replacements or additions to various bomb groups (RTU – Replacement Training). Hollywood actor, pilot and Army Air Force Captain (later Brigadier General) James Stewart was posted to Sioux City with his squadron in 1943, where he and his crew completed their initial B-24 Liberator qualification prior to deployment overseas.

The training of B-17 crews continued until May 1945. Around that time, the field received a new mission which required the conversion of the facilities for B-29 Superfortress training.

The base was transferred to the 17th Bombardment Operational Training Wing and began the transition to start B-29 training. By early June, there were ten B-29's on the field. The new training program was short lived, however because in August 1945 it was canceled. With the end of World War II, the former training base switched to becoming a processing center to discharge personnel out of the service and back into civilian life.

With its mission completed, Sioux City Army Air Base closed in December 1945.

=== Fighter-Interceptor base ===
However, the facility would not remain closed for long, as in September 1946 the airfield was opened by the Air Force Reserve. Sioux City Air Base was one of the first Air Force Reserve bases established after the war, and in December 1946 the 185th Iowa Air National Guard unit was established at Sioux City.

Assigned to the new Air Defense Command (ADC) upon reactivation, the 140th Army Air Force base unit was activated as its host unit. The mission of the 140th AFBU was to offer flight and ground training to all commissioned and enlisted members of the Air Force Reserve residing in Iowa, Minnesota, Nebraska, South Dakota and Wyoming.

During the 1950s, ADC based the 521st Air Defense Group at Sioux City beginning on 15 February 1953 as part of the Central Air Defense Force. The 521st had the 14th, 87th and 519th Fighter-Interceptor Squadrons, equipped with F-86 Sabres, F-84 Thunderstreaks, and F-102 Delta Daggers. In 1955, the 521st was reassigned and replaced by the 13th Fighter-Interceptor Squadron, which flew with the 14th FIS from the base until 1960.

=== ADCOM Radar Control Center ===
Beginning in 1959, the ADC flying activity was reduced and Sioux City became an ADC command and control base. The Sioux City Air Defense Sector (SCADS) was established on 1 October 1959 assuming control of former ADC Central Air Defense Force units in western Iowa, most of Nebraska along with southern South Dakota.

In 1959, a Semi Automatic Ground Environment (SAGE) Data Center (DC-22) was established at Sioux City AFS. The SAGE system was a network linking Air Force (and later FAA) General Surveillance Radar stations into a centralized center for Air Defense, intended to provide early warning and response for a Soviet nuclear attack. The operation of DC-22 with its AN/FSQ-7 computer was the primary mission of SCADS, as well as providing air defense over parts of Minnesota, Colorado and Wyoming

The Sector was disestablished on 1 April 1966 as part of an ADC consolidation and reorganization; its units were reassigned to the newly established 30th Air Division which took over operation of the SAGE DC-22. The 30th AD administered and trained subordinate units, and participated in numerous air defense training exercises. In addition, it supervised training of Air National Guard units with a pertinent mobilization assignment.

DC-22 was inactivated in September 1968 as ADC phased down its interceptor mission as the chances of a Soviet bomber attack on the United States seemed remote, its mission being consolidated into North American Aerospace Defense Command (NORAD).

With the inactivation of the 30th AD, the Air Force closed Sioux City Air Force Station as an active-duty facility. Its facilities were turned over to Sioux Gateway Airport, along with the Air Force Reserve and Iowa Air National Guard for limited military use. Today, the Sioux City SAGE building is reportedly now a turkey processing plant.

=== Iowa Air National Guard ===
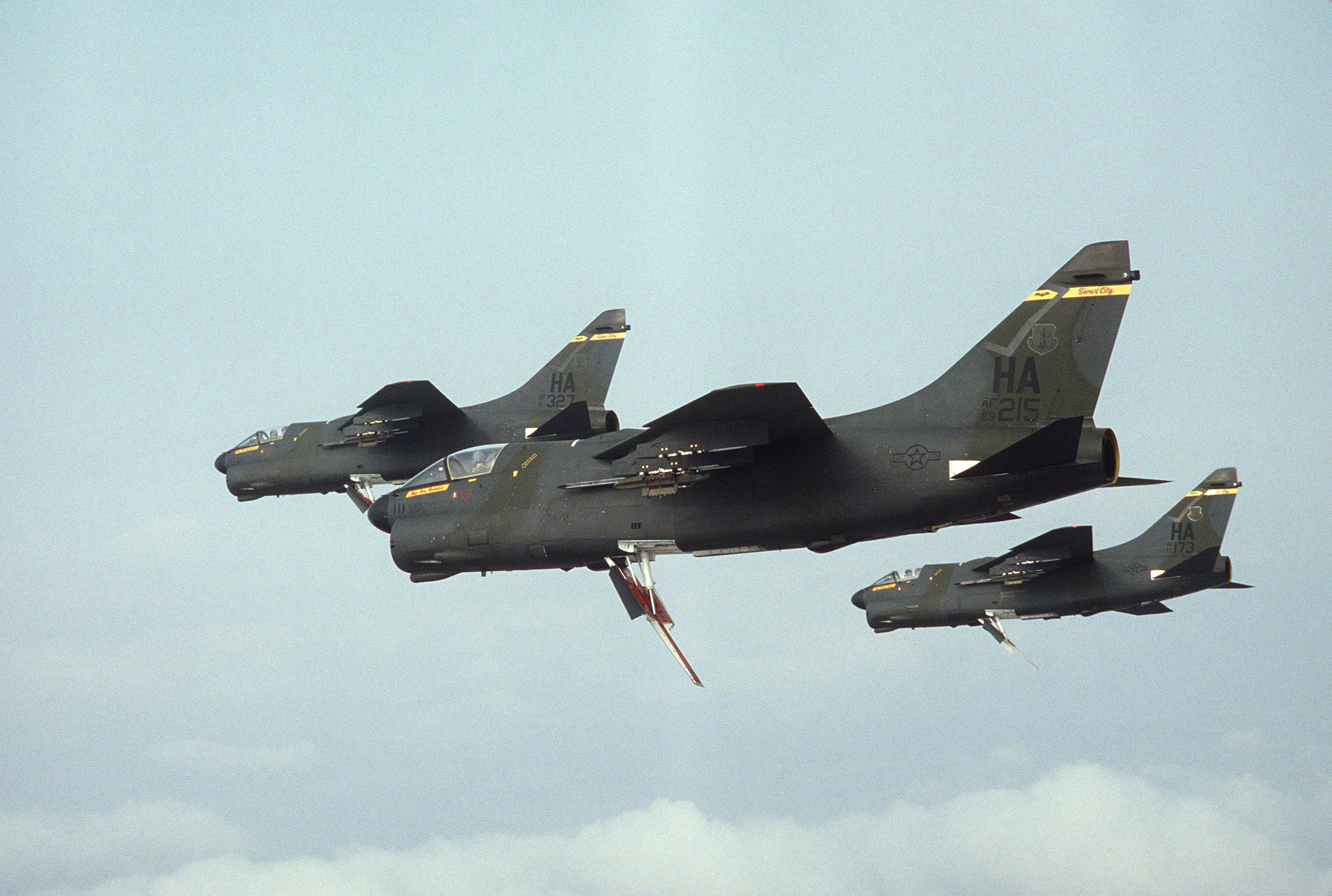
An air-to-air view of three Vought A-7D Corsair II aircraft in formation during Exercise TEAM SPIRIT'86 on 1986-03-01. The aircraft belonged to the 185th Tactical Fighter Group, Iowa Air National Guard, based at Sioux Gateway Airport in Sioux City, Iowa (USA), which flew the A-7D from 1977 to 1992.

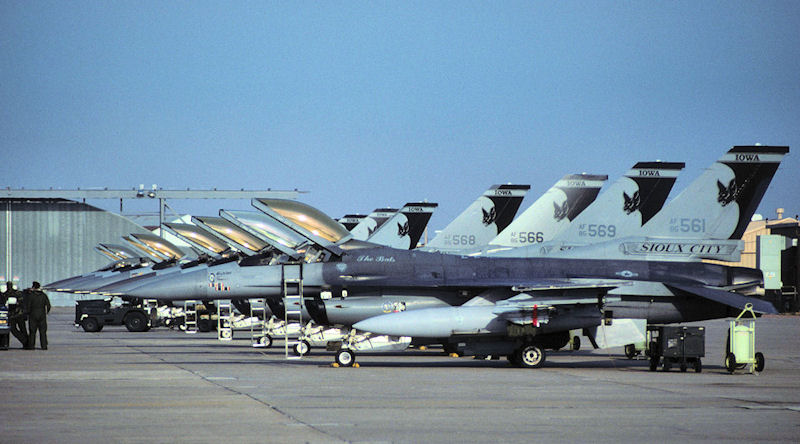
Iowa ANG F-16s on the flight line at Sioux City, 1998

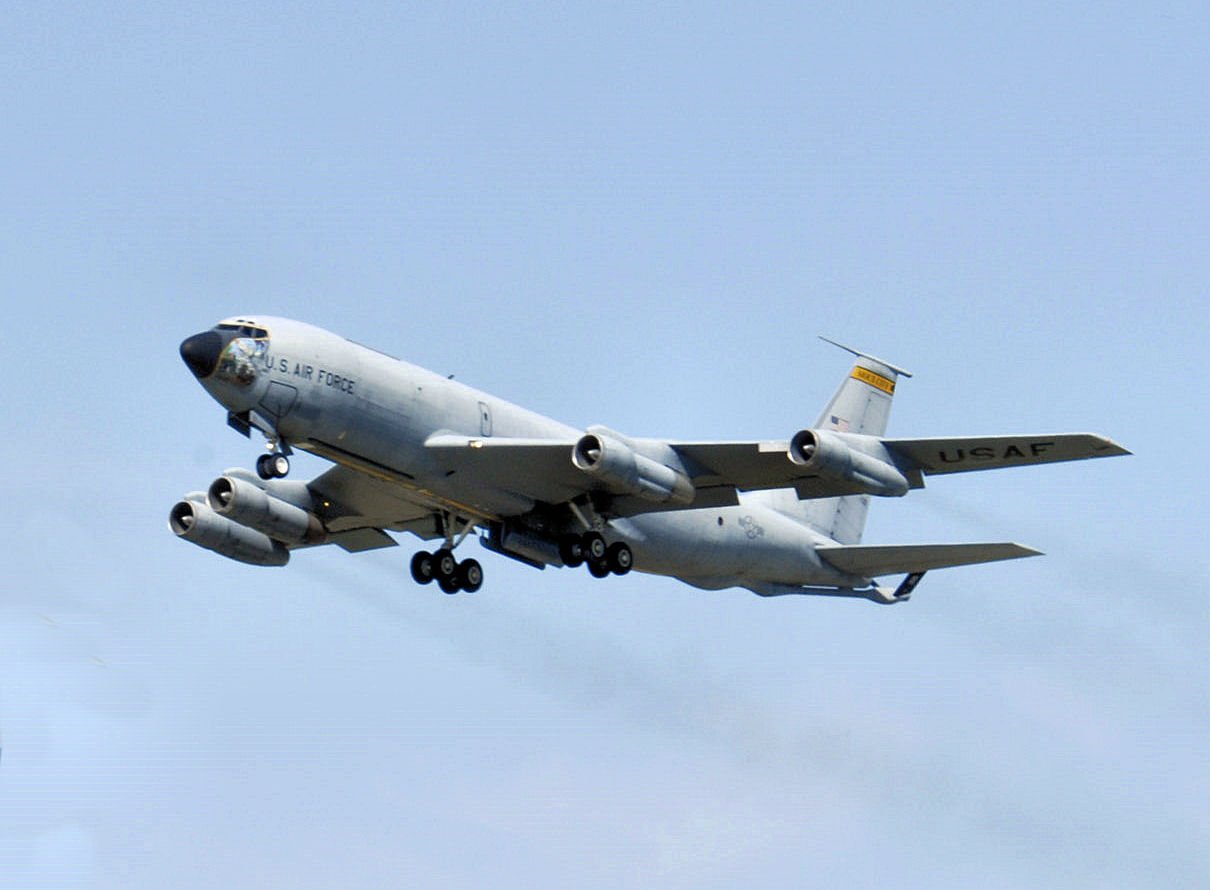
KC-135E departing Sioux City Airport for retirement

The 185th Air Refueling Wing was established in December 1946. The Army Air Force's 386th Fighter Squadron, flying P-47 Thunderbolts, was activated in 1943 and then inactivated in 1945 at the end of World War II. The unit was subsequently re-designated the 174th Fighter Squadron and allocated to the Iowa National Guard on 24 May 1946. On 2 December 1946, the 174th was extended Federal recognition and equipped with P-51 Mustangs. Today, the 174th is still the flying squadron at the 185th Air Refueling Wing, formerly the 185th Fighter Wing.

For three years, the 174th flew the P-51 Mustang, later redesignated the F-51 "Mustang after the U.S. Air Force became an independent service in 1947 and all Army Air Forces National Guard units became Air National Guard units. In 1949–50, the unit received its first jet, the F-84B "Thunderjet." The squadron was called to active duty on 1 April 1951 for service during the Korean War and moved to Dow AFB in Bangor, Maine. Most jet pilots transferred to USAF units in Europe and the Far East. During its Korean service, the squadron was re-equipped with the F-51D . The unit finished their tour and was transferred back to state control on 31 December 1952. In July 1953, the unit converted from F-51Ds to the F-80C Shooting Star.

In 1955, the 174th FS was re-designated the 174th Fighter Interceptor Squadron and was transitioned to the F-84E Thunderstreak as a component of the 132nd Fighter Interceptor Wing. In 1961, the unit was re-designated the 174th Tactical Fighter Squadron and converted to flying F-100C Super Sabre. On 1 October 1962, the unit reached group status and was reorganized and re-designated as the 185th Tactical Fighter Group.

On 26 January 1968, the 185th was recalled to active Federal service as a result of the "Pueblo Crisis". The 174th Tactical Fighter Squadron of the 185th augmented by many of the other personnel from the Group, deployed with their F-100s to Phu Cat Air Base, South Vietnam on 11 May 1968. During the course of the next 90 days, the balance of the 185th was deployed to six military bases in Korea and several others within the continental United States. As for the 174th, on 28 May 1969, the personnel and aircraft were recalled with the 185th and returned to Sioux City and released from active duty.

In 1977, the 185th converted to the A-7D Corsair II. On 19 December 1991, the 185th converted aircraft again, receiving F-16 Fighting Falcons. On 16 March 1992, the 185th Tactical Fighter Group was re-designated the 185th Fighter Group. As the Air Force and Air Guard standardized unit structures, the 185th was designated the 185th Fighter Wing. The F-16 "Fighting Falcon" would be the last jet fighter that the unit would fly before conversion to the KC-135 Stratotanker aerial refueling aircraft in 2003 and being re-designated the 185th Air Refueling Wing. In 2007, the 185th began transitioning from the KC-135E to KC-135R and KC-135T models with larger engines, capable of more missions.

== UA Flight 232 crash ==
On 19 July 1989, Sioux City IAP / Sioux City ANGB was the emergency landing site for United Airlines Flight 232 after a catastrophic failure of the plane's hydraulic system. The emergency landing happened to coincide with an activation of the base's Air National Guard force, which provided the maximum manpower on the airport including the firefighting forces of the local Air National Guard unit. The ANG firefighter's were only equipped to handle small commuter and Air Force A-7 aircraft, rather than a widebody jet such as the DC-10. It is widely recognized that the efforts of the Air Guardsmen at the Sioux City Airport contributed to many lives being saved after the crash of UA 232.

== Major units assigned ==
=== World War II ===
- 15th Bombardment Training Wing, November 1942–July 1943
- 393d Bombardment Group, June–August 1943 (OTU); November 1943–April 1944 (RTU)
- 17th Bombardment Wing, February–December 1945
- 47th Bombardment Wing, July–October 1945
- 99th Bombardment Group, November 1942–January 1943 (B-17)
- 100th Bombardment Group, December 1942–January 1943 (B-17)
- 379th Bombardment Group, February–April 1943 (B-17)
- 384th Bombardment Group, April–May 1943 (B-17)
- 388th Bombardment Group, April–June 1943 (B-17)
- 445th Bombardment Group, July–October 1943 (B-24)
- 448th Bombardment Group, September–November 1943 (B-24)
- 485th Bombardment Group, July–September 1945 (B-24)

=== Air Defense Command ===
- Sioux City Air Defense Sector, 1 October 1959

Re-designated: 30th Air Division, 1 April 1966–18 September 1968

- 521st Air Defense Group, 16 February 1953

Re-designated: 53d Fighter Group (Air Defense), 18 August 1955–1 April 1960

- 328th Fighter Wing (Air Defense), 1 July 1961–18 July 1968
- 163d Fighter-Interceptor Squadron, 10 March 1952–1 November 1952 (Federalized Indiana Air National Guard) (F-51D)
- 87th Fighter-Interceptor Squadron, 1 November 1952–21 December 1952 (F-51D)
- 519th Fighter-Interceptor Squadron, 8 December 1954

Re-designated: 13th Fighter-Interceptor Squadron, 18 August 1955–1 July 1959 (F-86D)

- 14th Fighter-Interceptor Squadron, 18 November 1953–1 April 1960 (F-86D)

=== Iowa Air National Guard ===
- 174th Fighter Squadron established 25 May 1946

Extended federal recognition 2 December 1946
Re-designated 174th Fighter Interceptor Squadron, 1955
Re-designated 185th Tactical Fighter Group, 1 October 1962
Re-designated 185th Fighter Group, 16 March 1992
Re-designated 185th Fighter Wing, 1992
Re-designated 185th Air Refueling Wing, 2003

== See also ==
- Iowa World War II Army Airfields
- List of USAF Aerospace Defense Command General Surveillance Radar Stations
