= 14th Fighter-Interceptor Squadron =

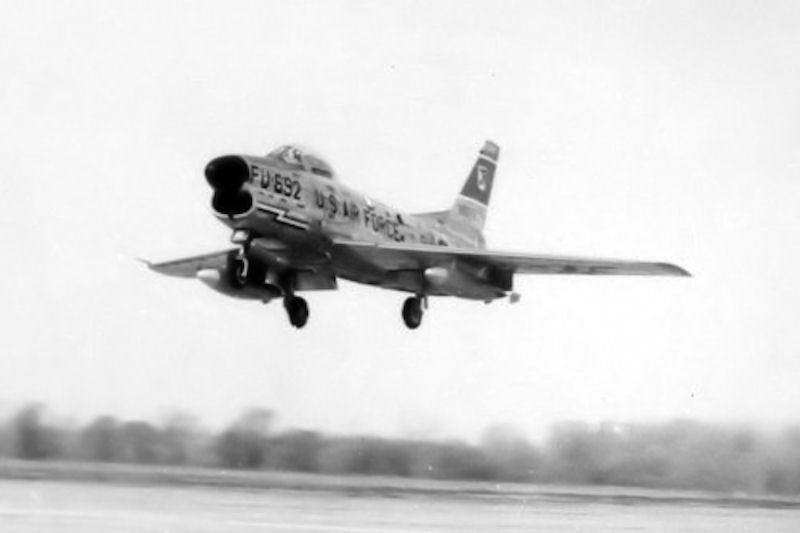
- F-86L 53-692 of the 14th Fighter-Interceptor Squadron, about 1958 landing at Sioux City
- Active: 1942–1944; 1947–1949; 1953–1960
- Country: United States
- Branch: United States Air Force
- Role: Fighter-Interceptor

Insignia
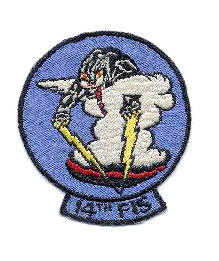
- 14th Fighter-Interceptor Squadron emblem (Note: Approved 6 October 1954.)

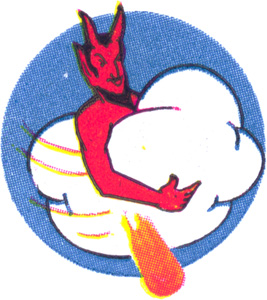
- 14th Fighter Squadron World War II emblem

The 14th Fighter-Interceptor Squadron is an inactive United States Air Force unit. Its last assignment was with the 53d Fighter Group at Sioux City Municipal Airport, Iowa, where it was inactivated on 1 April 1960.

The squadron was first activated in 1941 as the 14th Fighter Squadron. It served in the air defense of the Panama Canal during most of 1942, then returned to the United States and served as a Replacement Training Unit until it was disbanded in a general reorganization of Army Air Forces training units in the spring of 1944. From 1947 through 1949 the 14th served as a reserve unit. It was activated again in 1953 as an interceptor unit.

== History ==
=== World War II ===
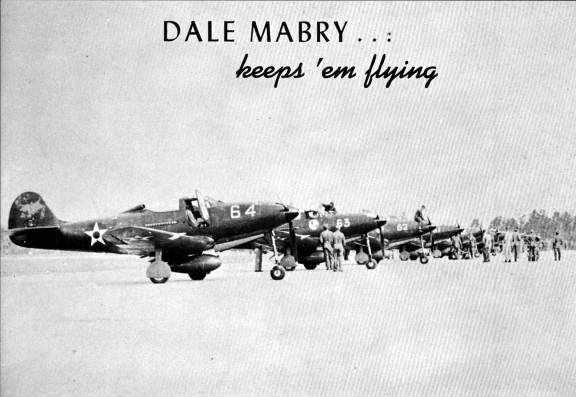
P-39s at Dale Mabry Field in 1943

The squadron was first activated in January 1941 at MacDill Field, Florida as one of the three original squadrons of the 53d Pursuit Group. In May, it moved with the group to Dale Mabry Field, Florida, where it trained with Seversky P-35s and Curtiss P-40 Warhawks. Following the Pearl Harbor Attack, The squadron converted to Bell P-39 Airacobras as it prepared to deploy to Panama as part of the defenses of the Panama Canal.

On 2 January 1942 the 14th moved to Chame Airfield, Panama, an auxiliary field of Albrook Field. By 16 February, the Squadron had 12 P-39Ds (of which nine were airworthy) and not fewer than 26 pilots, but of these, only four had more than 12 months experience. Following its initial encampment at Chame No. 1, the Squadron moved to the nearby Chame No. 2 on 1 April 1942. The unit was redesignated the 14th Fighter Squadron on 15 May 1942, as were other Army Air Forces (AAF) pursuit units. The squadron remained at Chame until 10 November 1942, when it was relieved by the 28th Fighter Squadron, and returned to the United States.

Upon returning to the United States, the squadron became a Replacement Training Unit (RTU). RTUs were oversized units, whose mission was to train individual pilots or aircrews. It provided instruction in Airacobras, and later in North American P-51 Mustangs and Republic P-47 Thunderbolts. However, the AAF was finding that standard military units like the 14th, based on relatively inflexible tables of organization were not proving well adapted to the training mission. Accordingly, it adopted a more functional system which each base was organized into a separate numbered unit. On 1 May 1944, the 14th and its sister training unit, the 13th Fighter Squadron were disbanded, and RTU activities at Venice Army Air Field, Florida (the squadron's base since July 1943), were absorbed by the 337th AAF Base Unit (Replacement Training Unit, Fighter).

=== Reserve duty ===
The squadron was reconstituted in June 1947 and reactivated at Greater Pittsburgh Airport, Pennsylvania the following month as a reserve unit under Air Defense Command. It was initially assigned directly to Eleventh Air Force, (Note: This Eleventh Air Force was responsible for reserve and Air National Guard training in the 1940s, and is not related to the current Eleventh Air Force.) until the fall, when it became part of the 375th Troop Carrier Group. The 444th AAF Base Unit (Reserve Training) (later the 2239th Air Force Reserve Training Center) supervised the unit's training. In July 1948, Continental Air Command assumed responsibility for managing reserve and Air National Guard units from ADC. It is not clear whether or not the squadron was fully staffed or equipped with operational aircraft. President Truman's reduced 1949 defense budget required reductions in the number of units in the Air Force, and the 14th was inactivated and not replaced.

=== Air Defense Command ===
The squadron was redesignated the 14th Fighter-Interceptor Squadron and activated by Air Defense Command (ADC), as the 521st Air Defense Group at Sioux City Municipal Airport, Iowa expanded from one to two interceptor squadrons. The squadron was equipped with North American F-86D Sabres equipped with fire-control radar and armed with Folding-Fin Aerial Rockets. In August 1955, ADC implemented Project Arrow, which was designed to bring back on the active list fighter units which had compiled memorable records in the two world wars. As a result, the squadron was again assigned to the 53d Fighter Group, which replaced the 521st at Sioux City.

In 1957, the squadron began replacing its F-86Ds with F-86Ls. The F-86L was an upgraded version of the F-86D, equipped with data link, which permitted it to receive direction from Semi-Automatic Ground Environment command centers without the need for voice communication with ground control intercept stations. The squadron inactivated in April 1960 as subsonic F-86s were withdrawn from air defense service.

== Lineage ==
- Constituted as the 14th Pursuit Squadron (Interceptor) on 20 November 1940

Activated on 15 January 1941
Redesignated 14th Fighter Squadron (Single Engine) on 15 May 1942
Disbanded on 1 May 1944

- Reconstituted on 3 June 1947

Activated in the reserve on 13 July 1947
Inactivated on 27 June 1949

- Redesignated 14th Fighter-Interceptor Squadron on 23 March 1953

Activated on 18 November 1953
Discontinued on 1 April 1960

=== Assignments ===
- 53d Pursuit Group (later 53d Fighter Group), 15 January 1941 – 1 May 1944
- Eleventh Air Force, 13 July 1947
- 375th Troop Carrier Group, 30 September 1947 – 27 June 1949
- 521st Air Defense Group, 18 November 1953
- 53d Fighter Group, 18 August 1955 – 1 April 1960

=== Stations ===
- MacDill Field, Florida, 15 January 1941
- Dale Mabry Field, Florida, 8 May – 18 December 1941
- Chame Airfield, Panama, 2 January - 10 November 1942
- Dale Mabry Field Florida, 26 November 1942
- Drew Field, Florida, 6 January 1943
- Page Field, Florida, 5 February 1943
- Venice Army Air Field, Florida, 10 July 1943 – 1 May 1944
- Greater Pittsburgh Airport, Pennsylvania, 13 July 1947 – 27 June 1949
- Sioux City Municipal Airport, Iowa, 18 November 1953 – 1 April 1960

=== Aircraft ===
- Seversky P-35, 1941
- Curtiss P-40 Warhawk, 1941
- Bell P-39 Airacobra, 1941–1943
- North American P-51 Mustang, 1943
- Republic P-47 Thunderbolt, 1943–1944
- North American F-86D Sabre, 1953–1957
- North American F-86L Sabre, 1957–1960
