= Iowa World War II Army Airfields =

Iowa World War II Army Airfields
- Part of World War II
- Map Of Iowa World War II Army Airfields

Site information
- Type: Army Airfields

Site history
- Built: 1940-1944
- In use: 1940-present

During World War II, the United States Army Air Forces (USAAF) established three airfields in Iowa.

Most of these airfields were under the command of First Air Force or the Army Air Forces Training Command (AAFTC). However Air Technical Service Command (ATSC) used the Des Moines airfield.

It is still possible to find remnants of these wartime airfields. Two were converted into municipal airports, some were returned to agriculture. Hundreds of the temporary buildings that were used survive today, and are being used for other purposes.

== Major Airfields ==
USAAF Name Current Name	Mission	Host Unit	Location	Coordinates	Notes
Des Moines International Airport; Des Moines Air National Guard Base	Joint Use USAAF/Civil Airport; Air Technical Services Command; 1st Concentration Command	842d Army Air Forces Specialized Depot	Des Moines	41°32′18″N 093°39′34″W	Used by ATSC as an Aircraft/Crew processing center for heavy bomber crews. Remained in use by Iowa Air National Guard after war ended and now a joint civil-military airport.
Sioux City Army Air Base; Sioux Gateway Airport; Sioux City Air National Guard Base	II Bomber Command; B-17/B-24 Bomber Training	354th Army Air Force Base Unit	Sioux City	42°23′54″N 096°22′19″W	Closed 1945. Used by Air Defense Command as an Interceptor base, 1946-1968; Ground Control Radar station, 1959-1970. Now joint-use civilian airport and Iowa ANG base for KC-135 air refueling aircraft.
Spencer Field; Spencer Municipal Airport	Army Air Forces Training Command; Contract Flying Instruction	Hunter Flying Service School, Primary Flight Instruction	Spencer	43°09′56″N 095°12′10″W	The mission of the school was to train glider pilot students in proficiency in operation of gliders in various types of towed and soaring flight, both day and night, and in servicing of gliders in the field. Inanctivated 1944
