= Ryan International Airlines Flight 590 =

1991 aviation accident

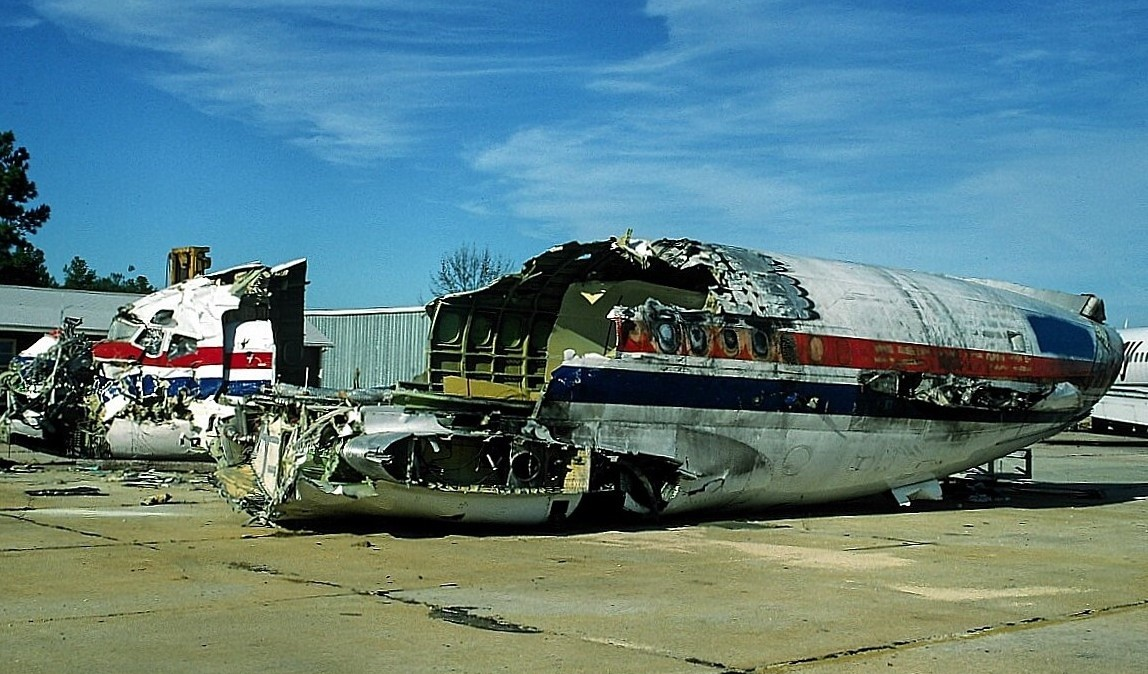
- Wreckage of the aircraft

Accident
- Date: February 17, 1991
- Summary: Crashed on takeoff due to atmospheric icing, pilot error, and poor FAA oversight
- Site: Cleveland Hopkins International Airport, Cleveland, Ohio, United States; 41°24.3′N 81°51.5′W

Aircraft
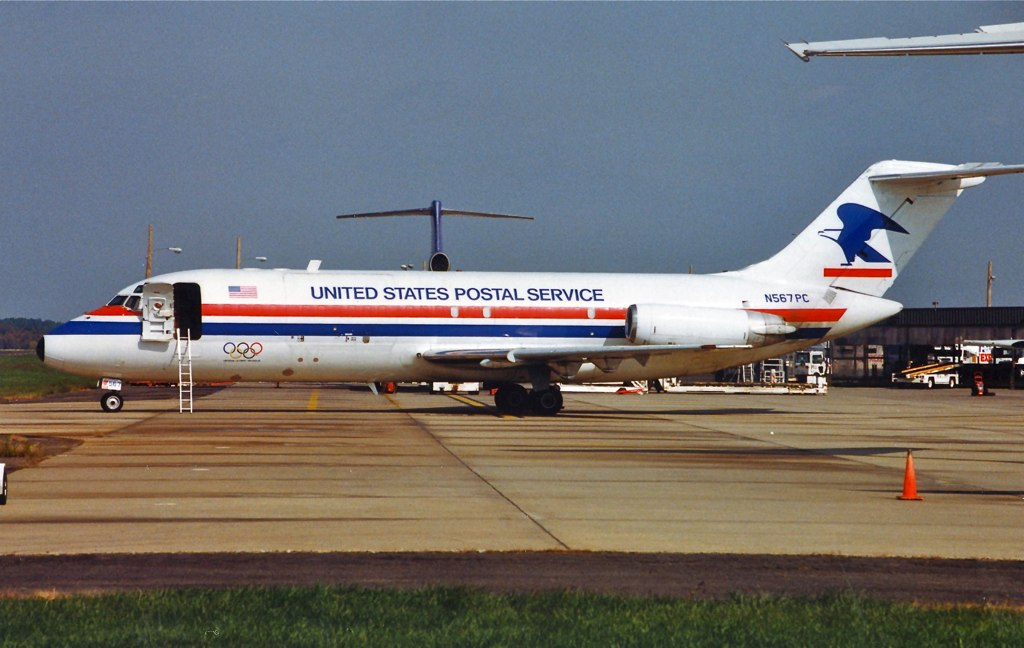
- N567PC, sister ship of the accident aircraft. this later crashed as USA Jet Airlines Flight 199
- Aircraft type: McDonnell Douglas DC-9-15RC
- Operator: Ryan International Airlines
- IATA flight No.: RD590
- ICAO flight No.: RYN590
- Call sign: RYAN 590
- Registration: N565PC
- Flight origin: Greater Buffalo International Airport, Buffalo, New York
- Stopover: Cleveland Hopkins International Airport, Cleveland, Ohio
- Destination: Indianapolis International Airport, Indianapolis, Indiana
- Occupants: 2
- Passengers: 0
- Crew: 2
- Fatalities: 2
- Survivors: 0

Ryan International Airlines Flight 590 was a cargo flight carrying mail for the United States Postal Service from Greater Buffalo International Airport (BUF) in Buffalo, New York, to Indianapolis International Airport (IND) in Indiana, with a stopover at Cleveland Hopkins International Airport (CLE) in Cleveland, Ohio. On February 17, 1991, the McDonnell Douglas DC-9-15RC operating the flight crashed on takeoff from Cleveland during icing conditions. Both pilots, the aircraft's only occupants, were killed. The National Transportation Safety Board (NTSB) determined that the causes of the crash were the flight crew failing to deice their aircraft, and the inexperience of the Federal Aviation Administration (FAA), McDonnell Douglas, and Ryan International Airlines with icing condition on DC-9-10 aircraft (the shortest variant of the DC-9).

== Background ==
=== Aircraft ===
The aircraft involved was a 22-year-old McDonnell Douglas DC-9-15RC (Rapid Change) registered as N565PC. The -15 is a subvariant of the series 10 of DC-9s.

The accident aircraft first flew in 1968 and was delivered to Continental Airlines as a passenger aircraft in July of that same year, registered as N8919. The aircraft operated with Continental for five years. In October 1973, the aircraft was delivered to Hughes Airwest and re-registered as N9351. In October 1980, the aircraft was transferred to Republic Airlines, which operated the aircraft until June 1984, when it was converted into a freighter and delivered to Purolator Courier. Three months later, the aircraft was registered as N565PC. In September 1987, the aircraft was transferred to Emery Worldwide then to Emery Worldwide Airlines (EWA) in 1989. Ryan International Airlines began to operate the aircraft in 1989, though it was owned by EWA at the time of the accident.

=== Crew ===
The captain was 44-year-old David Reay. He had flown with Ryan Air International since 1989 and logged 10,505 flight hours, including 505 hours on the DC-9. Reay was described "as a pilot with average skills who took criticism well," and "having very good command authority and being smooth on the controls." However, Reay had been involved in disciplinary action at the airline twice. The first was in August 1990, when he landed an aircraft without computing the proper data. The second was when he gained access to the jumpseat of an aircraft operated by a different airline by using an unauthorized identity card. Reay received a written warning on the first offense and a verbal warning on the second. Reay had also been involved in a business venture where he distributed literature claiming that he was in a partnership with the airline. After a talk with the airline's president, Reay reclaimed the literature. Reay had previously made a similar claim with another flight position, which resulted in him being removed from it. Despite this activity, Reay had no criminal arrests, nor had he been involved any vehicular accidents.

The first officer was 28-year-old Richard Duney Jr., who was far less experienced than captain Reay, having only been with the airline since January 28, 1991, less than a month before the accident. However, prior to joining RIA, he had been a pilot for a commuter airline from 1986 to 1989 and had served as a first officer on the DC-9 with USAir, but was laid off in 1991. Duney had 3,820 flight hours, with 510 of them on the DC-9.

The airline's chief pilot described Duney as "very personable and eager to do a good job." However, on March 28, 1990, Duney was involved in a car accident, though no charges were filed. Duney did not have any criminal history.

=== Weather ===
At 23:50, the National Weather Service (NWS) issued the following weather report at CLE:

Time – 2350; type – record special; ceiling – indefinite, 1,500 feet obscured; visibility – 1 mile variable; weather – light snow; temperature – 23°F; dewpoint – 19°F; wind – 220 degrees at 14 knots; altimeter – 29.91 inches; remarks – runway 5R visual range 6,000 feet plus, visibility 3/4 mile variable 1 1/2 miles.

— National Weather Service

The National Aviation Weather Unit (NAWU) warned pilots flying into Ohio that there were icing conditions and turbulence. No AIRMETs (airman's meteorological information) were in effect. The NWS forecast at CLE was as follows:

Ceiling 1,000 feet obscured, visibility 1 mile in light snow and blowing snow, wind 220 degrees 20 knots gusting to 30 knots. Occasionally ceiling 2,000 feet overcast, visibility 4 miles in light snow. Low-level windshear. After 2300: ceiling 4,000 feet overcast, visibility 5 miles in light snow, wind 210 degrees 18 knots gusting to 28 knots. Occasionally ceiling 2,000 feet overcast, visibility 2 miles in light snow and blowing snow. Low-level windshear. After 0700: ceiling 4,500 feet overcast, wind 320 degrees 7 knots, chance of light snow showers. After 1400: VFR.

— National Weather Service

In other words, the weather was dangerously cold with the temperature at 23 °F (−5 °C), enough to cause ice to accumulate on aircraft, and the dew point at 19 °F (−7 °C). There was light snow and strong winds blowing at 14 knots (16 mph; 26 km/h), increasing the risk of windshear. Pilots could only operate under instrument flight rules until 14:00 the next day.

== Accident ==
At 00:06 on February 17, first officer Duney requested departure clearance from air traffic control (ATC). The controller stated:

Ryan five ninety Cleveland clearance cleared to the Indianapolis airport as filed climb and maintain five expect flight level two six zero one two (12) minutes after departure departure frequency will be one two four point zero squawk five seven seven three.

At 00:08, due to the freezing temperatures and snow, the pilots activated the engine anti-ice system, which uses engine heat to prevent sensors from freezing, ensuring accurate instrument readings. The cockpit voice recorder (CVR) recorded the following conversation snippet (CAM is short for Cockpit Area Microphone, RDO is short for radio, -1 is the captain, -2 is the first officer, and -? indicates an unidentified voice):

00:08:49 CAM-2 Ignition?

00:08:50 CAM-1 It's now off.

00:08:52 CAM-2 Off. Electrical power checked. Engine anti-ice?

00:08:55 CAM-1 I just turned it on.

— Transcript, Ryan International Airlines Flight 590 Cockpit Voice Recorder

At 00:09, first officer Dunney requested taxi clearance. The tower controller instructed the flight to "taxi [to] runway two three left via Juliet and the ramp." A minute later, the controller reminded the flight about the braking conditions (no flights had landed while Flight 590 was on the ground):

00:10:58 TWR Ryan five ninety last braking I had was ah when you arrived I believe you called it fair.

00:11:01 CAM-1 That's correct.

00:11:03 RDO-2 Five ninety roger.

— Transcript, Ryan International Airlines Flight 590 Cockpit Voice Recorder

At 00:14, Continental Airlines Flight 1238 informed the tower controller that they were on approach to the same runway. The controller cleared Flight 1238 to land, informing them about Flight 590's braking conditions. At 00:17 Flight 590 lined up on runway 23L, and one minute later, at 00:18, was cleared for takeoff:

00:18:17.5 TWR Ryan five ninety cleared for takeoff fly ah runway heading.

0018:18 CAM-1 On.

RDO-1 Okay we're two three left and we appreciate your help.

0018:24.4 TWR You're very welcome wind two three zero at one two.

— Transcript, Ryan International Airlines Flight 590 Cockpit Voice Recorder

At 00:18:24.6 Flight 590 commenced its takeoff roll from runway 23L. The engine anti-ice system was on during the takeoff roll. First officer Dunney was the pilot flying, and the following was recorded by the CVR:

00:18:24.6 [SOUND OF ENGINES INCREASE IN SPEED]

00:18:27.0 RDO-1 Hay [sic] that's a captain's winds.

00:18:29.0 TWR Allright. [sic]

00:18:31.1 CAM-1 Okay air speed's alive.

00:18:33.0 CAM-1 Engines are stabilized, power's set for departure.

00:18:37.5 CAM-1 Fuel's even kind'a balanced.

00:18:39.4 CAM-1 One hundred knots.

00:18:41.3 [SOUND SIMILAR TO RUNWAY NOISE (BANGING)]

0018:44.9 CAM-1 V_{1}.

0018:45.9 CAM-1 Rotate.

0018:48.3 CAM-1 V_{2}.

0018:49.2 CAM-1 Plus ten.

00:18:50.4 CAM-1 Positive rate.

00:18:51.2 CAM-1 Watch out.

00:18:51.7 CAM-1 Watch out.

00:18:52.1 CAM-1 Watch out.

00:18:52.3 [SOUND SIMILAR TO ENGINE COMPRESSOR SURGES START]

00:18:53.1 [SOUND SIMILAR TO STICK SHAKER STARTS]

00:18:55.5 [SOUND OF ENGINE COMPRESSOR SURGES STOPS]

00:18:55.8 RDO-? [SOUND OF OPEN MIKE KEY FOR 0.45 SECONDS]

00:18:56.0 [SOUND OF STICK SHAKER STOPS]

00:18:56.78 [SOUND OF FIRST IMPACT]

00:18:56.82 [SOUND OF SECOND LOUDER IMPACT]

00:18:57.4 RDO-? [SOUND OF OPEN MIKE STARTS AND CONTINUES UNTIL END OF RECORDING]

00:18:57.6 END OF RECORDING

— Transcript, Ryan International Airlines Flight 590 Cockpit Voice Recorder

Captain Reay called out "rotate" at 00:18:45.9 and the aircraft lifted off. Almost immediately after, however, the aircraft began to bank left, as indicated by the flight data recorder. This was also mentioned in statements from the tower controller and other witnesses. Several witnesses even went as far as to state that they saw an explosion before the aircraft crashed. According to the CVR, captain Reay called out "watch out" three consecutive times. Both engines began to experience compressor stalls and the stick shaker activated, both lasting for about three seconds. The aircraft rolled 90° to the left and entered a stall. At 00:18:57, the aircraft crashed back onto runway 23L, the left wing contacted the ground first, followed by the rest of the aircraft. The aircraft then flipped over and skidded along the runway, causing the cockpit and forward fuselage to separate and were destroyed. Both pilots were killed on impact by extreme trauma. The passengers and crew on Continental Airlines Flight 1238 witnessed the accident.

== Investigation ==
Less than an hour after the accident occurred, the NTSB was notified about it. A go-team traveled to Cleveland four hours later. The United States Postal Service and airport workers recovered mail that had not been destroyed in the crash.

The left wing and number-one (left) engine were both destroyed during the accident sequence, but the right wing and number-two (right) engine, were mainly intact. The number-one engine had a high rotation speed at the time of impact. The flaps were extended to 20° at the time of impact, though the flap handle (part of it having been bent on impact) was positioned near 30°. The horizontal stabilizer was at 34° nose up. The engine anti-ice heat switches were in the "ON" position at the time of impact. Despite witnesses stating that the aircraft was on fire or exploded before impact, the only fire and explosions had occurred during the impact sequence.

According to the CVR, the most notable information was during the takeoff sequence, including captain Reay's callouts, as well as the stick shaker and engine compressor stalls. According to the flight data recorder (FDR), the aircraft had reached a maximum airspeed of 155 knots (178 mph; 287 km/h) during its flight. The stick shaker had activated at 150 knots (170 mph; 280 km/h). Flight 590 had experienced a sudden drop in normal acceleration to 0.7 g during its takeoff. The NTSB compared the takeoff of Flight 590 with another DC-9-10 in similar conditions. The acceleration of the comparison flights only dropped to almost 0.9 g during takeoff.

The NTSB examined other accidents that were involved icing, such as Ozark Air Lines Flight 982, Air Florida Flight 90, and Continental Airlines Flight 1713. Following the Flight 1713 accident, McDonnell Douglas presented a paper warning about ice accumulation on DC-9s. The FAA had also disagreed with a safety recommendation from the Flight 1713 accident (labeled as A-88-134), which recommended DC-9-10 series aircraft be de-iced with strong glycol during icing conditions.

Ryan International Airlines' DC-9s flight crew operations manual (FCOM) required the first officer to inspect the aircraft for ice after landing in icing conditions. However, according to ground witnesses, neither crew member left the aircraft while it was parked. The NTSB believed that this was because of the flight crew's previous experience with larger variants of the DC-9, which have leading edge devices and are less vulnerable to icing conditions, and possibly the fact that no other flight requested deicing before takeoff. The NTSB even considered fatigue as a reason the crew did not inspect the aircraft (as well as if it was a factor in the accident altogether), the crew had been on the same flight schedule on the same route for six days and captain Reay may have been experiencing a cold; the demanding schedules can hamper illness recovery and contribute to fatigue. Nevertheless, the NTSB had insufficient evidence and was unable to determine if fatigue did indeed play a role in the accident.

The NTSB also noted that both Douglas and the FAA had been aware of previous DC-9 accidents in icing conditions, but had poor oversight. Ryan International Airlines was also unaware of these accidents when they purchased the DC-9s.

=== Conclusion ===
The NTSB published its final report nearly nine months later, stating:

The National Transportation Safety Board determines that the probable cause of this accident was the failure of the flightcrew to detect and remove ice contamination [caused by icing conditions; in this case, the ground weather] on the airplane's wings, which was largely a result of a lack of appropriate response by the Federal Aviation Administration, Douglas Aircraft Company, and Ryan International Airlines to the known critical effect that a minute amount of contamination has on the stall characteristics of the DC-9 series 10 airplane. The ice contamination led to wing stall and loss of control during the attempted takeoff.

— National Transportation Safety Board

The NTSB determined that the accident had been caused by the icing contamination as a result of the flight crew failing to conduct an external examination of the aircraft after landing in cold weather, as well as the failure of the FAA, McDonnell Douglas, and Ryan International Airlines to respond appropriately from previous ice-related accidents, and their lack of understanding of icing condition of the DC-9-10 aircraft.

Six safety recommendations were issued to the FAA, and recommendation A-88-134 was reiterated.

=== Other views ===
NTSB chairman James L. Kolstad, and vice chairman Susan Coughlin both gave dissenting statements; both of them agreed that pilot error was the cause of the crash, though they also stated that the failure of the airline industry as a whole to properly understand deicing was a cause of the accident. Kolstad stated:

My colleagues believe that this last failure – the failure to inspect – was the result of poor organizational performance. The aircraft in question is especially susceptible to lift problems with wing ice. Because this problem was known but apparently not clearly communicated to the accident crew, the majority believe that the air carrier, the aircraft manufacturer, and the Federal Aviation Administration were in the direct line of causation [of this accident].

— James L. Kolstad, Chairman, National Transportation Safety Board, Final report

Vice chairman Coughlin stated that the NTSB should revise its probable cause to read the following:

The National Transportation Safety Board determines that the probable cause of this accident was the failure of the flightcrew to detect and remove ice contamination on the airplane's wings, in part because of a lack of cohesive action by the aviation community at large directed at the known critical effect that a minute amount of contamination has on the stall characteristics of the DC-9 Series 10 airplane, which can lead to wing stall and loss of control during an attempted takeoff.

— Susan M. Coughlin, Vice Chairman, National Transportation Safety Board, Final report

The NTSB did not revise its probable cause on Flight 590. However, when USAir Flight 405 crashed in 1992 in icing conditions, the NTSB would state that the aviation industry's poor oversight was a cause of that crash.

== See also ==
- Continental Airlines Flight 1713
- Ozark Air Lines Flight 982
- Scandinavian Airlines System Flight 751
- Air Florida Flight 90
