= 519th Fighter-Interceptor Squadron =

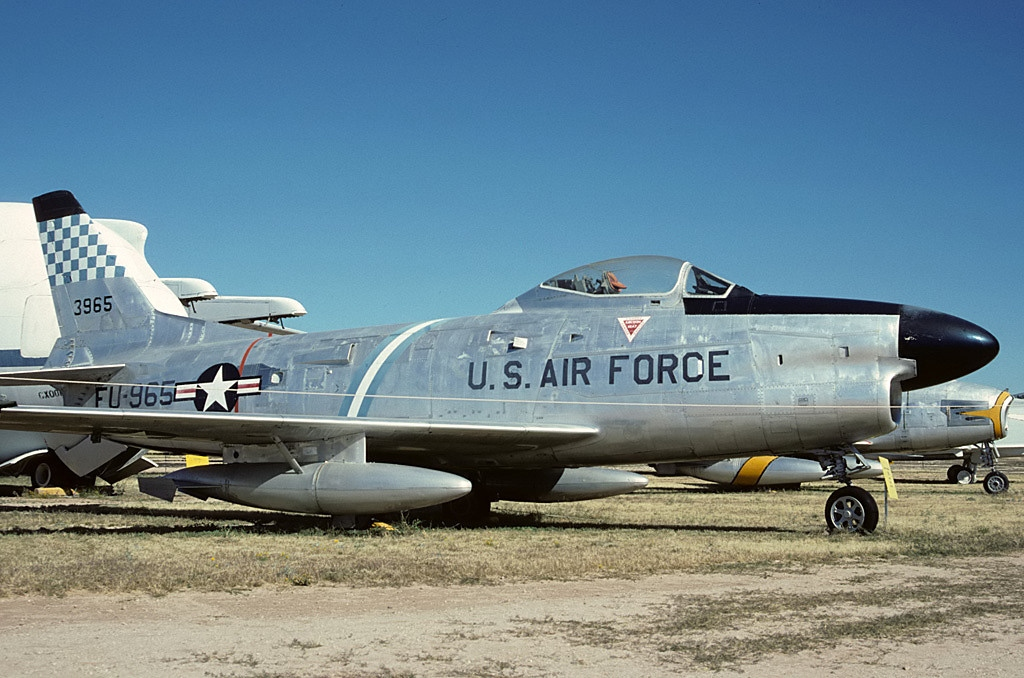
- F-86D Sabre as flown by the squadron
- Active: 1943–1944; 1954–1955
- Country: United States
- Branch: United States Air Force
- Role: Fighter-Interceptor

The 519th Fighter-Interceptor Squadron is an inactive United States Air Force unit. Its last assignment was with the 521st Air Defense Group at Sioux City Municipal Airport, Iowa, where it was inactivated on 18 August 1955. The squadron was first activated during World War II as the 637th Bombardment Squadron, a dive bomber unit, but was disbanded before participating in combat in a general reorganization of Army Air Forces training units. It was reconstituted during the Cold War as a fighter interceptor unit supporting the air defense of the United States.

== History ==
=== World War II ===
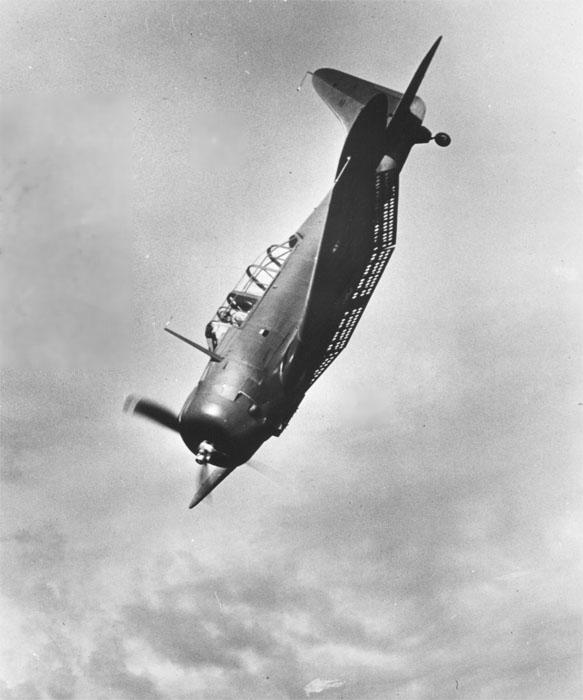
A-24 diving

The squadron was activated in April 1943 as the 637th Bombardment Squadron at Key Field, Mississippi, as one of the original squadrons of the 408th Bombardment Group. In August, along with other Army Air Forces (AAF) single engine dive bomber units, it became a fighter-bomber unit as the 519th Fighter-Bomber Squadron. The squadron did not receive aircraft to begin training until October, after it had moved to Drew Field, Florida. It served as an operational training unit with various aircraft, providing cadres to "satellite groups" and as a replacement training unit, training individual pilots.

However, the AAF was finding that standard military units, based on relatively inflexible tables of organization, were not proving well adapted to the training mission. Accordingly, it adopted a more functional system in which each AAF base was organized into a separate numbered unit. In this reorganization the squadron was disbanded in 1944 as the AAF converted to the AAF Base Unit system. It was replaced, along with other units at Woodward Army Air Field, by the 267th AAF Base Unit (Combat Crew Training Station, Fighter) in a reorganization of the AAF in which all units not programmed for deployment overseas were replaced by AAF Base Units to free up manpower for assignment overseas.

=== Cold War air defense ===
During the Cold War the squadron was reconstituted, redesignated as the 519th Fighter-Interceptor Squadron and activated at Sioux City Municipal Airport, Iowa in December 1954, where it was assigned to the 521st Air Defense Group. The squadron replaced the 87th Fighter-Interceptor Squadron, which moved to England from Sioux City. At Sioux City, the squadron flew airborne intercept radar equipped and Mighty Mouse rocket armed North American F-86D Sabre aircraft.

The 521st Group was inactivated and replaced by the 53d Fighter Group (Air Defense) in 1955 as part of Air Defense Command's Project Arrow, which was designed to reestablish the fighter units which had compiled memorable records in the two world wars. The squadron was inactivated along with the group and its equipment and personnel were transferred to the 13th Fighter-Interceptor Squadron, which was simultaneously activated.

== Lineage ==
- Constituted as the 637th Bombardment Squadron (Dive) on 23 March 1943

Activated on 5 April 1943
Redesignated 519th Fighter-Bomber Squadron on 10 August 1943
Disbanded on 1 April 1944

- Reconstituted and redesignated 519th Fighter-Interceptor Squadron on 4 November 1954

Activated on 8 December 1954
Inactivated on 18 August 1955

=== Assignments ===
- 408th Bombardment Group (later 408th Fighter-Bomber Group), 5 April 1943 – 1 April 1944
- 521st Air Defense Group, 8 December 1954 – 18 August 1955

=== Stations ===
- Key Field, Mississippi, 5 April 1943
- Drew Field, Florida, 24 September 1943
- Abilene Army Air Field, Texas, 10 November 1943
- DeRidder Army Air Base, Louisiana, 11 February 1944
- Woodward Army Air Field, Oklahoma, 26 March – 1 April 1944
- Sioux City Municipal Airport, Iowa, 8 December 1954 – 18 August 1955

=== Aircraft ===
- Douglas A-24 Banshee, 1943–1944
- North American A-36 Apache, 1943–1944
- Curtiss P-40 Warhawk, 1943–1944
- Republic P-47 Thunderbolt 1943–1944
- North American F-86D Sabre, 1954–1955
