= Cap. Krish Persaud Airport =

Chame Airport
- IATA: none; ICAO: none; LID: MP24

Summary
- Airport type: Public
- Location: Panama
- Elevation AMSL: 141 ft / 43 m
- Coordinates: 8°35′20″N 79°53′23″W

Map
- Location in Panama

Runways
Direction	Length		Surface
Direction	m	ft	Surface
18/36	1,200	3,937	Asphalt
- Sources: WAD GCM

Chame Airport (LID: MP24) is an airport serving Chame District, a district in the Panamá Oeste Province of Panama. The airport is 4 kilometres (2.5 mi) inland from the Gulf of Panama.

== History ==
During World War II the facility was used as an auxiliary military airfield (Chame Airdrome, Chame Airfield #1) of Howard Field as part of the defense of the Panama Canal. Assigned units were the USAAF 53d Fighter Group, 14th Fighter Squadron (2 January-24 November 1942) and 28th Fighter Squadron (10 November 1942 – 25 September 1945) flying P-39 Airacobras, AT-6, BT-13, and UC-78s.

== See also ==
- Transport in Panama
- List of airports in Panama
