= Spencer Municipal Airport =

Airport in Clay County, Iowa

Spencer Municipal Airport Northwest Iowa Regional Airport
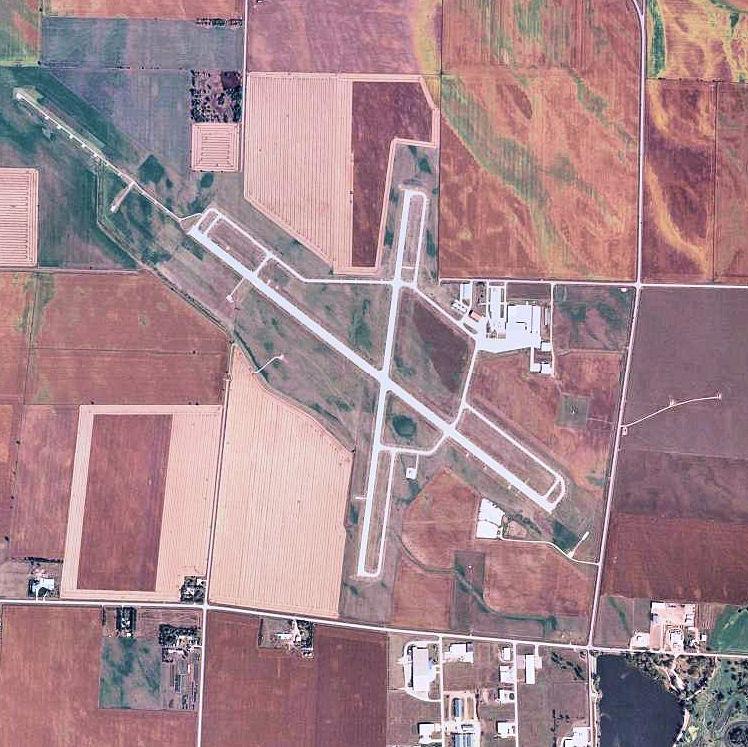
- 2006 USGS orthophoto
- IATA: SPW; ICAO: KSPW; FAA LID: SPW

Summary
- Airport type: Public
- Owner: City of Spencer
- Operator: Leading Edge Aviation
- Serves: Spencer, Iowa
- Location: Riverton Township, Clay County
- Elevation AMSL: 1,339 ft / 408 m
- Coordinates: 43°09′56″N 95°12′10″W
- Website: SpencerIowaCity.com/...

Map
- Location of airport in Iowa SPW (the United States)

Runways
Direction	Length		Surface
Direction	ft	m	Surface
12/30	6,001	1,829	Concrete
18/36	5,100	1,554	Concrete

Statistics
- Aircraft operations (2016): 15,090
- Based aircraft (2018): 37
- Source: FAA, airport website

Spencer Municipal Airport (IATA: SPW, ICAO: KSPW, FAA LID: SPW), also known as Northwest Iowa Regional Airport, is a public airport located three miles (5 km) northwest of the central business district of Spencer, a city in Clay County, Iowa, United States. It is owned by the City of Spencer.

The airport is used by charter airlines including Plane Master Services and Nova Air. It has been served by Great Lakes Airlines. The airline was named after the nearby Iowa Great Lakes. The airline has since ceased operations.

== History ==
Activated in March 1942 as Northwest Iowa Regional Airport, the facility provided contract glider training to the United States Army Air Forces between 1942 and 1944. Training was provided by Hunter Flying Service. The airport was an all-way turf airfield with a 4,000' x 4,000' landing/takeoff area. The facility was used primarily to train C-47 Skytrain and Waco CG-4 unpowered glider crews in various types of towed and soaring flight, both day and night, and for servicing gliders in the field.

Northwest Iowa Regional was deactivated during 1944 with the drawdown of AAFTC's pilot training program. The property was declared surplus, turned over to the Army Corps of Engineers on 30 September 1945 and was eventually discharged to the War Assets Administration (WAA) to become a civil airport, eventually renamed Spencer Municipal.

== Facilities and aircraft ==
Spencer Municipal Airport covers an area of 812 acres (329 ha) which contains two concrete paved runways: 12/30 measuring 6,001 x 100 ft (1,829 x 30 m) and 18/36 measuring 5,100 x 75 ft (1,554 x 23 m).

For the 12-month period ending June 30, 2016, the airport had 15,090 aircraft operations, an average of 41 per day: 76% general aviation, 24% air taxi and less than 1% military. In November 2018, there were 37 aircraft based at this airport: 27 single-engine, 6 multi-engine, 2 jet and 2 ultralight.

== See also ==
- List of airports in Iowa
- Iowa World War II Army Airfields
- 31st Flying Training Wing (World War II)
