= 521st Air Defense Group =

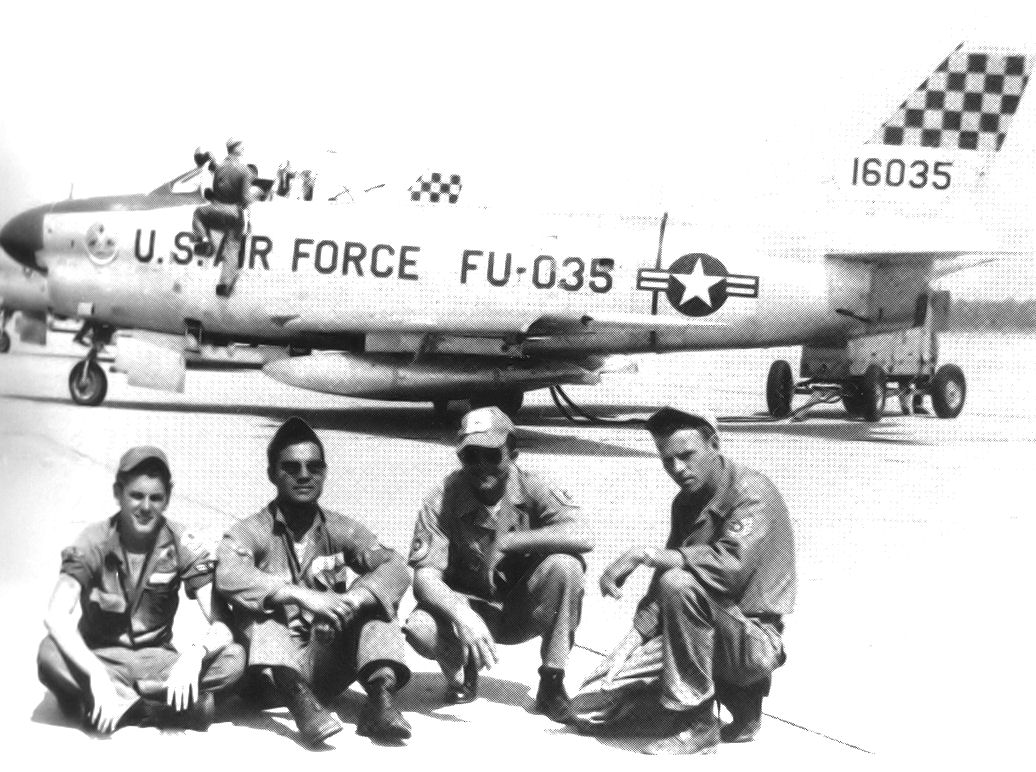
- F-86D of the 87th Fighter-Interceptor Squadron at Lockbourne AFB (Note: Aircraft is North American F-86D-30-NA Sabre, seria 51-6035. Taken in 1956.)
- Active: 1945; 1953–1955
- Country: United States
- Branch: United States Air Force
- Type: Fighter interceptor
- Role: Air defense

The 521st Air Defense Group is a disbanded United States Air Force organization. Its last assignment was with the 31st Air Division at Sioux City Municipal Airport, Iowa, where it was inactivated in 1955. The group was originally activated as the 521st Air Service Group, a support unit for the 310th Bombardment Group at the end of World War II in Italy and then redeployed to the United States where it was inactivated in 1945.

The group was activated as the 521st Air Defense Group once again in 1953, when Air Defense Command (ADC0 established it as the headquarters for a dispersed fighter-interceptor squadron and the medical, aircraft maintenance, and administrative squadrons supporting it. It was replaced in 1955 when ADC transferred its mission, equipment, and personnel to the 53d Fighter Group in a project that replaced air defense groups commanding fighter squadrons with fighter groups with distinguished records during World War II.

== World War II ==
The group was first activated as the 521st Air Service Group in a reorganization of Army Air Forces (AAF) support groups in which the AAF replaced service groups that included personnel from other branches of the Army and supported two combat groups with air service groups including only Air Corps units. It was designed to support a single combat group. Its 947th Air Engineering Squadron provided maintenance that was beyond the capability of the combat group, its 771st Air Materiel Squadron handled all supply matters, and its Headquarters & Base Services Squadron provided other support. The group supported 310th Bombardment Group in Italy. The group returned to the US in 1945 and was inactivated. It was disbanded in 1948.

== Cold War ==
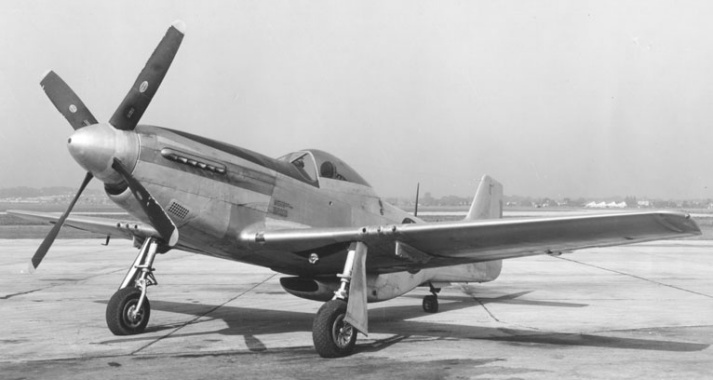
F-51D as flown by the 87th FIS until 1953

The group was reconstituted, redesignated as the 521st Air Defense Group, and activated at Sioux City Municipal Airport in 1953 with responsibility for air defense of central Midwestern United States. It was assigned the 87th Fighter-Interceptor Squadron (FIS), which was already stationed at Sioux City Airport, and flying World War II era North American F-51 Mustangs as its operational component. The 87th FIS had been assigned directly to the 31st Air Division. The group replaced the 79th Air Base Squadron as the host USAF unit at Sioux City Municipal Airport. It was assigned three squadrons to perform its support responsibilities.

In the fall of 1953 the 87th FIS upgraded to radar equipped and Mighty Mouse rocket armed North American F-86D Sabre jet aircraft and the 14th Fighter-Interceptor Squadron, also flying Sabres, was activated as the group's second operational squadron. In November 1954 the 87th FIS moved to England and was reassigned. The 87th FIS was replaced the next month by the 519th Fighter-Interceptor Squadron, another Sabre squadron. The group was inactivated and replaced by the 53d Fighter Group (Air Defense) in 1955 as part of Air Defense Command's Project Arrow, which was designed to bring back on the active list the fighter units which had compiled memorable records in the two world wars. It was disbanded once again in 1984.

== Lineage ==
- Constituted as the 521st Air Service Group

Activated on 1 January 1945
Inactivated on or about 7 November 1945
Disbanded on 8 October 1948

- Reconstituted and redesignated as 521st Air Defense Group on 21 January 1953

Activated on 16 February 1953
Inactivated on 18 August 1955
Disbanded on 27 September 1984

== Assignments ==
- XII Air Force Service Command, 1 January 1945
- Unknown, c. 17 July 1945 – 7 November 1945
- 31st Air Division, 1 January 1953 – 18 August 1955

== Stations ==
- Ghisonaccia Airfield, Corsica, France, 1 January 1945 – 7 April 1945
- Fano Airfield, Italy 7 April 1945 – c. 6 July 1945
- Naples, Italy, c.. 6 July 1945 – c. 17 July 1945
- Camp Patrick Henry, Virginia, c. 26 Jul 1945 – c. 30 July 1945
- Unknown, July 1945–7 Nov 1945
- Sioux City Municipal Airport, Iowa, 1 January 1953 – 18 August 1955

== Components ==
Operational Squadrons

- 14th Fighter-Interceptor Squadron, 18 November 1953 – 18 August 1955
- 87th Fighter-Interceptor Squadron, 16 February 1953 – 21 December 1954
- 519th Fighter-Interceptor Squadron, 8 December 1954 – 18 August 1955

Support Units

- 521st Air Base Squadron, 16 February 1953 – 18 August 1955
- 521st Materiel Squadron, 16 February 1953 – 18 August 1955
- 521st Medical Squadron (later 521st USAF Infirmary), 16 February 1953 – 18 August 1955
- 771st Air Materiel Squadron, 1 January 1945 – 1945
- 947th Air Engineering Squadron, 1 January 1945 – 1945

== Aircraft ==
- North American F-51D Mustang, 1953
- North American F-86D Sabre, 1953–1955

== See also ==
- List of United States Air Force Aerospace Defense Command Interceptor Squadrons
- List of F-86 Sabre units

== Notes ==
Explanatory notes

Citations
