= 86th Fighter Weapons Squadron =

86th Fighter Weapons Squadron

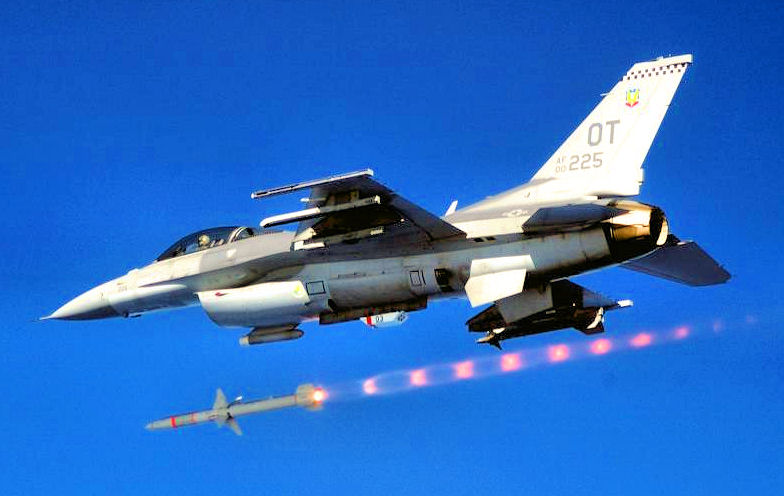
- 85th Test and Evaluation Squadron F-16 Fighting Falcon shooting an AGM-88 during COMBAT HAMMER (Note: Aircraft is General Dynamics F-16CJ Block 50 Fighting Falcon, serial 00-225)
- Active: 1985–present
- Country: United States
- Branch: United States Air Force
- Role: Air to ground weapons evaluation
- Part of: Air Combat Command
- Garrison/HQ: Hill AFB, Utah
- Decorations: Air Force Outstanding Unit Award

Insignia
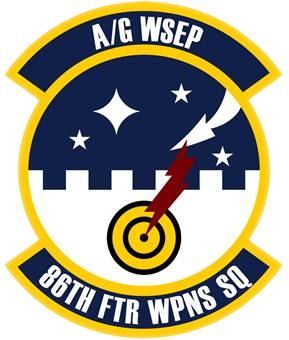
- 86th Fighter Weapons Squadron emblem

The United States Air Force's 86th Fighter Weapons Squadron conducts the Air Force air-to-ground weapon system evaluation program (COMBAT HAMMER). The 86 FWS evaluates the total air-to-ground precision guided munitions process including weapon buildup, weapon loading, aircraft, aircrew employment procedures, support equipment, technical data and maintenance actions. The squadron hosts active and guard WSEP deployments annually at Eglin Air Force Base, Florida and Hill Air Force Base, Utah. The annual launching of 450-plus PGMs evaluates the Air Force's air-to-ground precision capabilities and also provides full-scale precision guided munitions (PGM) employment training for combat Air Force crews as a secondary objective. The weapons previously and currently evaluated include the AGM-130, EGBU-15, GBU-10 Paveway II, GBU-12 Paveway II, GBU-24 Paveway III, GBU-27 Paveway III, GBU-28, Joint Direct Attack Munition (GBU-31/38/53), AGM-65 Maverick, AGM-86 CALCM, AGM-154 Joint Standoff Weapon, AGM-88 High Speed Antiradiation Missile, and the Wind Corrected Munitions Dispenser (GBU-103/104/105).

"Squadron personnel verify weapon system performance, determine reliability, evaluate capability and limitations, identify deficiencies, recommend corrective action, and maintain [Combat Air Force]-wide data. The squadron investigates PGM envelopes and evaluates capabilities and limitations to determine future employment requirements. They provide liaison support for pre-deployment, employment, and redeployment of Air Combat Command, United States Air Forces in Europe, Pacific Air Forces, Air National Guard, and Air Force Reserve assets participating in WSEP."

The squadron also conducts investigative firings of PGM to address CAF employment issues and to support developmental and operation test and evaluation.

== Lineage ==
- Designated as the 4486th Fighter Weapons Squadron

Activated on 1 October 1985
Redesignated 86th Fighter Weapons Squadron on 1 December 1991

=== Assignments ===
- USAF Tactical Air Warfare Center, 1 October 1985
- 4443d Test and Evaluation Group, 1 August 1988
- 79th Test and Evaluation Group, 1 December 1991
- 53d Weapons Evaluation Group, 23 August 1999 – present

=== Stations ===
- Eglin Air Force Base, Florida, 1 October 1985 - unknown
- Hill Air Force Base, Utah, unknown – present
