= Ozark Air Lines Flight 982 =

1968 aviation accident in Iowa

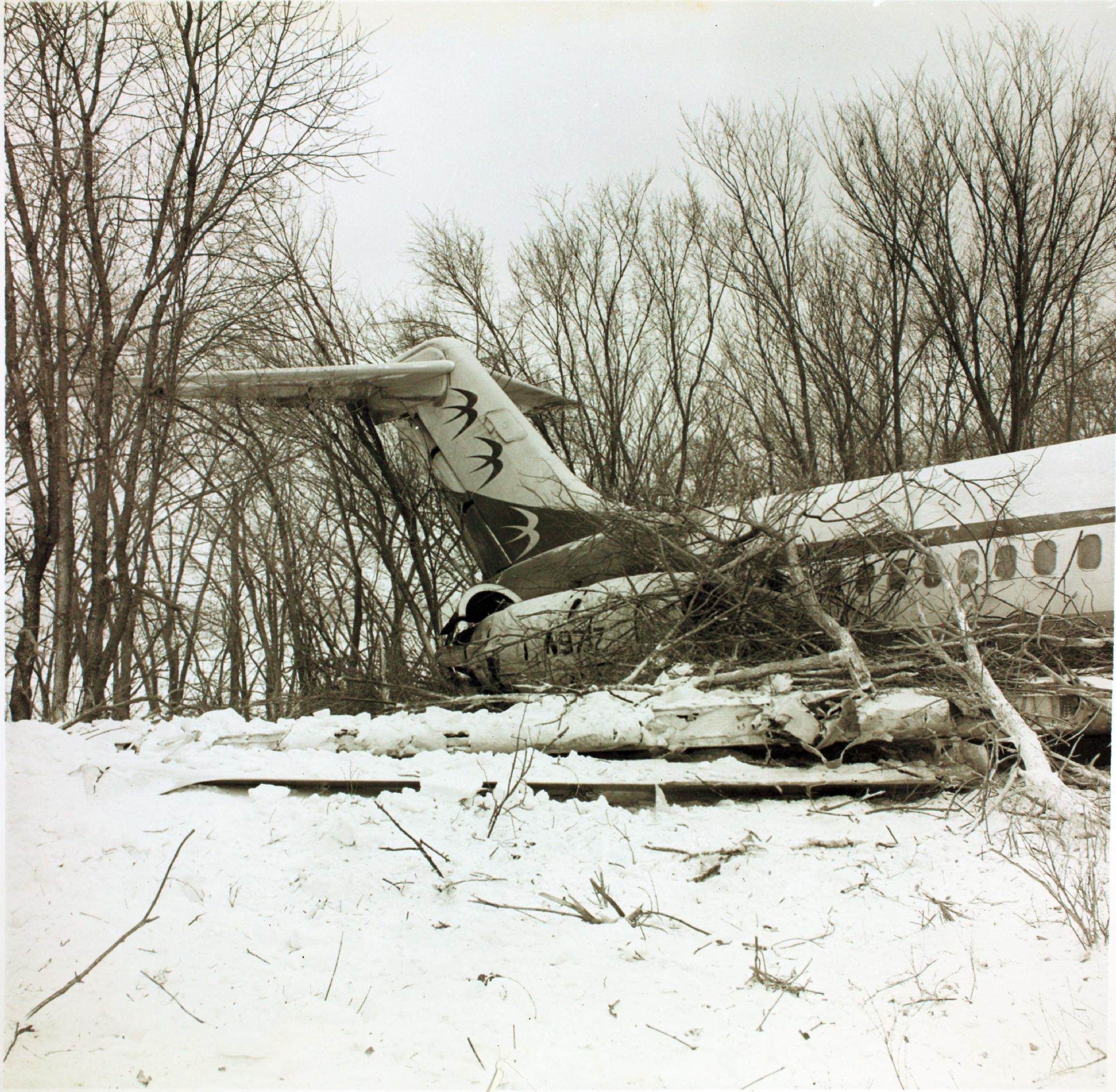
- The aircraft after crashing

Accident
- Date: December 27, 1968
- Summary: Stalled due to ice and pilot error
- Site: Sioux Gateway Airport, Sioux City, Iowa

Aircraft
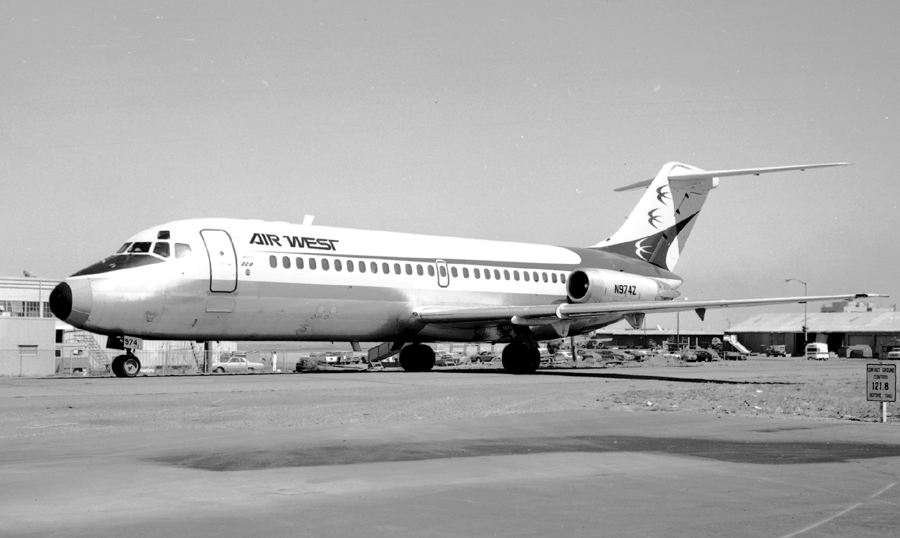
- N974Z, the aircraft involved in the accident, while still in service with Air West in August 1968
- Aircraft type: Douglas DC-9-15
- Operator: Ozark Air Lines
- IATA flight No.: OZ982
- ICAO flight No.: OZA982
- Call sign: OZARK 982
- Registration: N974Z
- Flight origin: Sioux Gateway Airport
- Destination: O'Hare International Airport
- Occupants: 68
- Passengers: 64
- Crew: 4
- Fatalities: 0
- Injuries: 35
- Survivors: 68

Ozark Air Lines Flight 982 was a regularly scheduled flight on December 27, 1968, originating from Sioux Falls Regional Airport to O'Hare International Airport connecting through Sioux Gateway Airport that crashed shortly after takeoff. The McDonnell Douglas DC-9 struck the ground about 500 feet beyond the end of the runway and came to a stop about 1200 ft from the end of the runway. Thirty-five of the flight's 64 passengers and four crew members were taken to area hospitals, mostly for treatment of minor cuts and scratches.

== Background ==
Ozark Airlines began service in Sioux City on August 9, 1955. It was the first crash of a DC-9 jetliner for Ozark since the beginning of their use on July 8, 1966.

=== Aircraft ===
The aircraft involved in the accident was a year old Douglas DC-9-15, registered N974Z. The aircraft had accumulated 3,458 flight hours.

=== Crew ===
The flight was piloted by captain Patrick G. Sweeney, who was 48, and had 19,145 flight hours, and had 63 on the DC-9. The copilot was John T. Schmeltz, being 33 at the time of the crash. He had 6,048 flight hours, with 20 being on the type.

== Accident ==
According to the NTSB report: "At approximately 07:11 local time, the aircraft crashed a half-mile north of the airport in a wooded area. There were no fatalities. Among the 64 passengers and four crew members, 11 passengers were hospitalized with minor injuries and three crew members received serious injuries. The aircraft was destroyed in the crash. There was no fire. Flight 982 began its takeoff on Runway 35 with the flight crew aware that ice was present on the wings. The aircraft lifted off and the landing gear was selected to the up position by the first officer. The captain began turning off the landing and taxi lights. As the landing gear began to retract, the aircraft rolled abruptly and violently to the right to an angle of bank estimated by the flight crew to have reached 90°. The captain applied additional power and left rudder in an attempt to level the wings. When no immediate response was noted, he then applied left aileron. With the application of left aileron, the right wing came up; however, the roll continued to the left until the left wing contacted the runway. At this point, the captain discontinued the takeoff. He, approximately 110 feet beyond the departure threshold of Runway 35, succeeded in leveling the wings prior to final ground contact. The aircraft came to rest in a grove of trees approximately 1,181 feet beyond the departure end of Runway 35."

== Investigation ==
According to the NTSB report, the probable cause was: "A stall near the upper limits of ground effect, with subsequent loss of control as a result of aerodynamic and weight penalties of airfoil icing. The flight crew failed to have the airfoil ice removed prior to the attempted takeoff from Sioux City. The board also finds that the crew selected an improper takeoff thrust for the existing gross weight condition of the aircraft."

Anderson Construction Company took 12 hours to salvage and tow the 27.5-ton aircraft to the Air National Guard hangar for further examination by the NTSB.

== Aftermath ==
According to the manager of Ozark's News Bureau in St. Louis, Charles R. Ehlert, it was the "first crash of any significance for the airline." The US$3 million aircraft (equivalent to $27,800,000 in 2025) was a total loss.
