= 53rd Wing =

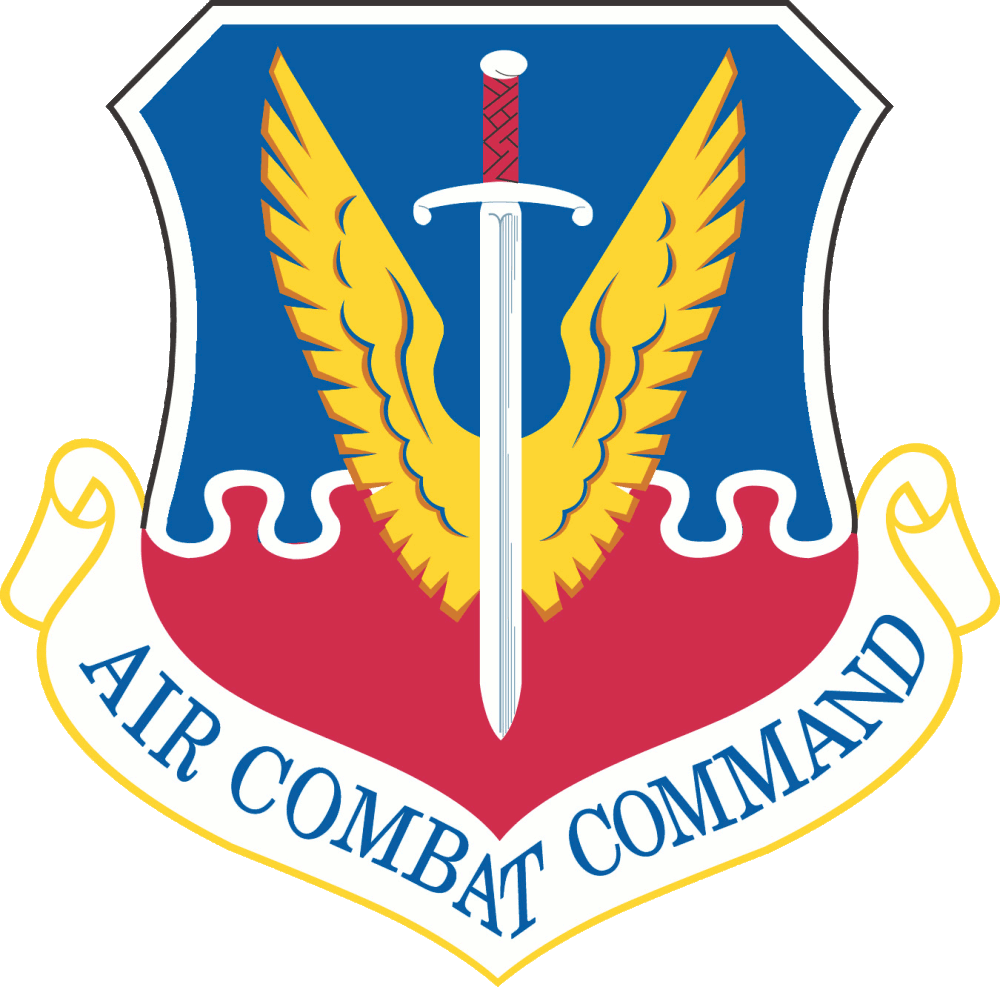
53rd Wing

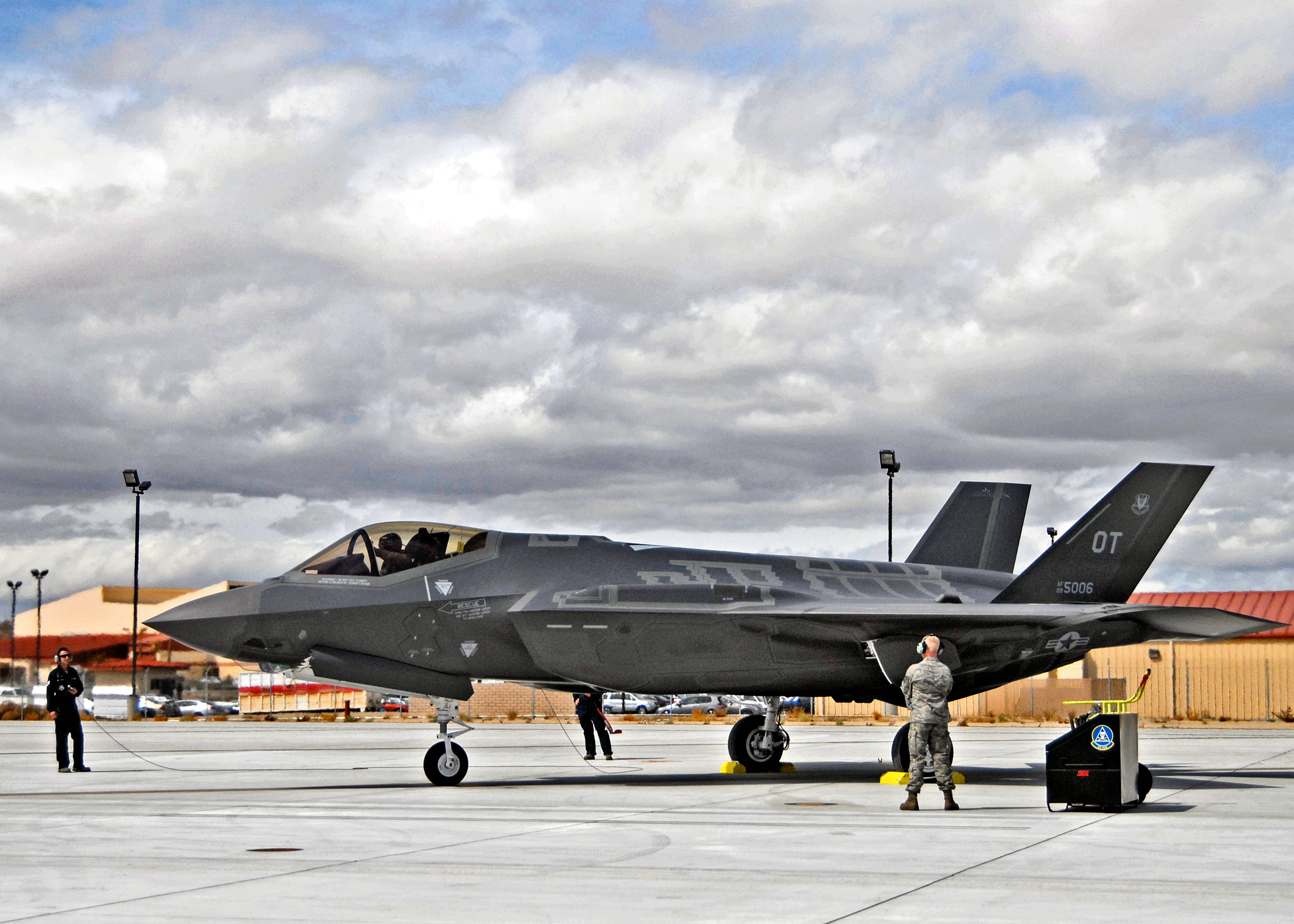
- 31st Test and Evaluation Squadron F-35 Lightning II (Note: Aircraft is Lockheed Martin F-35A Lightning II, serial 09-5006.)
- Active: 1941–1944; 1955–1960; 1963–present
- Country: United States
- Branch: United States Air Force
- Role: Operational test and evaluation
- Size: 2100
- Part of: Air Combat Command
- Garrison/HQ: Eglin Air Force Base
- Motto: Defense by Offense (1941–1956)Offense by Defense (1956-1960)
- Decorations: Air Force Outstanding Unit Award; Organizational Excellence Award

Commanders
- Current commander: Col. Scott A. Gunn
- Deputy Commander: Col. Christopher M. Conant
- Command Chief Master Sergeant: CCM Chad W. VanCleave-Goff
- Notable commanders: Paul V. Hester; Ronald Keys

Insignia
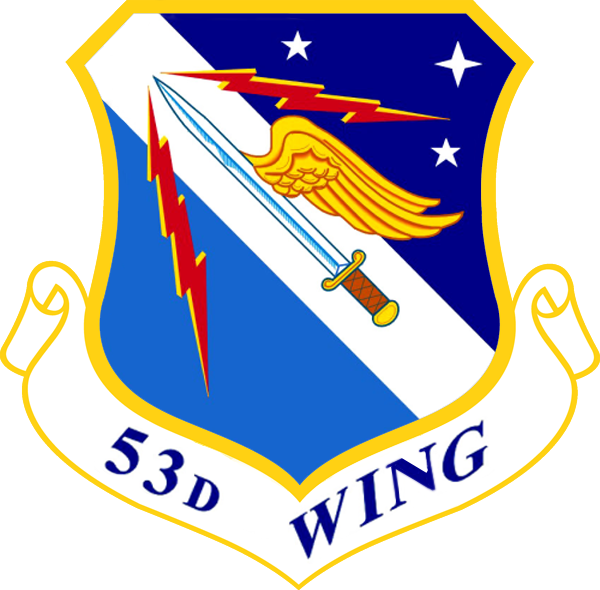
- 53d Wing emblem (Note: Approved 26 May 1964.)

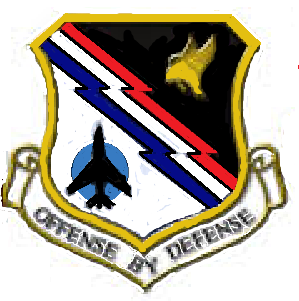
- 53rd Fighter Group (Air Defense) emblem (Note: Approved 26 July 1956.)

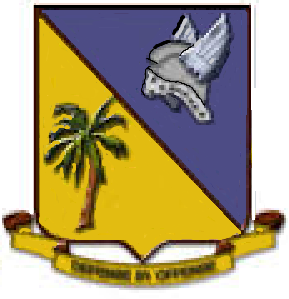
- 53rd Fighter Group emblem (Note: Approved 8 January 1943. Description: Per bend azure and or, in chief an ancient winged Norse helmet argent, in base a palm tree proper.)

The 53rd Wing is a wing of the United States Air Force based at Eglin Air Force Base, Florida. The wing reports to the United States Air Force Warfare Center at Nellis Air Force Base, Nevada, which in turn reports to Headquarters Air Combat Command.

The 53rd Wing serves as the focal point for the combat air forces in electronic warfare, armament and avionics, chemical defense, reconnaissance, and aircrew training devices. The wing is also responsible for operational testing and evaluation (OT&E) of new equipment and systems proposed for use by these air forces. Current wing initiatives include advanced self-protection systems for combat aircraft, aircrew life support systems, aerial reconnaissance improvements, new armament and weapons delivery systems, and improved maintenance equipment and logistics support. The 53d Wing, which consists of four groups, numbers almost 2,000 military and civilians at 17 locations throughout the United States.

== Units ==
- 53rd Test and Evaluation Group

28th Test and Evaluation Squadron
59th Test and Evaluation Squadron
85th Test and Evaluation Squadron
88th Test and Evaluation Squadron
418th Test and Evaluation Squadron
422nd Test and Evaluation Squadron
556th Test and Evaluation Squadron
Operational Flight Program Combined Test Force

- 53rd Weapons Evaluation Group

53d Test Support Squadron
81st Air Control Squadron
82d Aerial Targets Squadron
83d Fighter Weapons Squadron Combat Archer
86th Fighter Weapons Squadron Combat Hammer

- 753rd Test and Evaluation Group

15th Test and Evaluation Squadron
29th Test and Evaluation Squadron
31st Test and Evaluation Squadron
49th Test and Evaluation Squadron
53rd Computer Systems Squadron
72nd Test and Evaluation Squadron
337th Test and Evaluation Squadron
410th Test and Evaluation Squadron
417th Test and Evaluation Squadron

== History ==
=== World War II ===
The group was activated in 1941 as the 53rd Pursuit Group with the 13th, 14th, and 15th Pursuit Squadrons assigned. The 53d trained fighter pilots with Seversky P-35 and Curtiss P-40 Warhawk aircraft from its activation until December 1941. After the United States entered World War II the group moved to the Panama Canal Zone to fly patrols in defense of the Panama Canal. In conjunction with the move, the group converted to Bell P-39 Airacobra aircraft. There it was redesignated as the 53rd Fighter Group. The group returned to Florida in November 1942, where it became a Replacement Training Unit (RTU) training replacement fighter pilots. RTUs were oversized units whose mission was to train individual pilots or aircrews. It used P-39s until June 1943 and Republic P-47 Thunderbolts thereafter. In early 1943, the group added a fourth squadron, the 438th Fighter Squadron.

The AAF found that standard military units, based on relatively inflexible tables of organization were proving less well adapted to the training mission. Accordingly, a more functional system was adopted in which each base was organized into a separate numbered unit. The group was disbanded in as a result of this reorganization in 1944 and its personnel, equipment and mission were assumed by the 338th AAF Base Unit (Replacement Training Unit, Fighter).

=== Cold War Air Defense ===
The group was reconstituted, redesignated as the 53rd Fighter Group (Air Defense) and activated to replace the 521st Air Defense Group at Sioux City Municipal Airport as part of Air Defense Command's Project Arrow to bring back on the active list fighter units that had achieved memorable records in the two World Wars. The 14th Fighter-Interceptor Squadron (FIS), already at Sioux City transferred from the 521st, while the 13th FIS moved to Sioux City to replace the 519th FIS. Both squadrons flew rocket armed and radar equipped F-86D Sabres. Between August 1955 and April 1960 the 53d served as an air defense unit, participating in North American Air Defense Command (NORAD) exercises and testing automated air defense systems. It also was the host organization for the USAF and was assigned several support units to carry out this function. In the fall of 1957 both of the group's squadrons upgraded their Sabres to F-86L models with data link for interception control through the Semi-Automatic Ground Environment system. In July 1959 the 13th FIS moved to Glasgow AFB, Montana and was reassigned. The group and its remaining components were inactivated in 1960. In 1985, the group was redesignated as the 53rd Tactical Fighter Group, but it was never active under that designation.

=== Test and Evaluation ===
The USAF Tactical Air Warfare Center was activated in 1963 to improve use of USAF tactical aviation in support of ground forces by operationally testing weapon systems and tactics for the joint U.S. Strike Command. It employed a cross-section of tactical aircraft from Tactical Air Command (TAC) bases across the country. During the Vietnam War it tested tactical weapons systems and tactics for use in Southeast Asia. After the war it continued operational testing of new tactical aviation weapon systems. In 1977 the center began an annual series of Air Force-wide exercises to improve command, control, communications, and intelligence (C3I) techniques. Around the same time it embarked on the electronic warfare evaluation program, and continued OT&E of aviation weapon systems for TAC and later Air Combat Command, the Department of Defense, and the North Atlantic Treaty Organization. From 1983 to present, responsible for the operational testing and evaluation (OT&E) of all Air Force aircraft/weapons systems, and providing range control for live-firing missile programs on the Gulf range and aerial targets, using full scale and subscale drones. In September 1995, the 53rd Tactical Fighter Group and USAF Air Warfare Center were consolidated and the consolidated unit was redesignated as the 53rd Wing the following month.

In 2021 on the activation of the 350th Spectrum Warfare Wing, the 53rd Electronic Warfare Group was inactivated, broken up, and its units transferred to the new wing.

== Lineage ==
Group

- Constituted as the 53rd Pursuit Group (Interceptor) on 20 November 1940

Activated on 15 January 1941
Redesignated as the 53rd Fighter Group on 15 May 1942
Disbanded on 1 May 1944

- Reconstituted and redesignated as the 53rd Fighter Group (Air Defense), on 20 June 1955

Activated on 18 August 1955
Discontinued on 1 April 1960
Redesignated as the 53rd Tactical Fighter Group on 31 July 31, 1985
Consolidated with the USAF Air Warfare Center on 25 September 1995 (consolidated unit designated the USAF Air Warfare Center)

Center

- Designated and organized as the USAF Tactical Air Warfare Center on 1 November 1963

Redesignated as the USAF Air Warfare Center on 1 October 1991
Consolidated with the 53rd Tactical Fighter Group on 25 September 1995

Consolidated Wing

- Redesignated as the 53d Wing on 1 October 1995

== Assignments ==
- 22d Pursuit Wing, 15 January 1941
- 3d Interceptor (later III Fighter) Command, 2 October 1941
- Caribbean (later, Sixth) Air Force, 1 January 1942
- 26th Interceptor (later, 26th Fighter, XXVI Fighter) Command, 6 March 1942
- III Fighter Command, 26 November 1942 – 1 May 1944
- 31st Air Division, 18 August 1955
- 20th Air Division, 1 March 1956
- Kansas City Air Defense Sector, 1 January 1960 – 1 April 1960
- Tactical Air Command, 1 November 1963
- Air Combat Command, 1 June 1992
- United States Air Force Warfare Center, 1 October 1985 – present

== Stations ==
- MacDill Field, Florida, 15 January 1941
- Dale Mabry Field, Tallahassee, Florida, 8 May 1941 – 8 December 1941
- Howard Field, Panama Canal Zone, 1 January 1942 – 10 November 1942
- Dale Mabry Field, Florida, 26 November 1942
- Drew Field, Tampa, Florida, 7 January 1943
- Fort Myers Army Air Field (later Page Field, Florida, 6 February 1943 – 1 May 1944
- Sioux City Municipal Airport, Iowa, 18 August 1955 – 1 April 1960)
- Eglin Air Force Base, Florida, 1 November 1963 – present

== Components ==
=== Wing ===
- 4485th Test Wing: 16 March 1964 – 30 June 1965

=== Groups ===
- 57th Test Group (later 53d Test Management): 1 November 1991 – 1 August 1997, 1 October 2002 – 1 October 2021
- 68th Electronic Combat Group (later 53d Electronic Warfare): 15 April 1993 - 25 June 2021
- 475th Weapons Evaluation Group (later 53d Weapons Evaluation): 23 January 1991 – present
- 753rd Test and Evaluation Group: 1 October 2021 – present
- 4441st Tactical Training Group (Blue Flag) (later 41st Training Group): 1 March 1977 – 15 April 1993
- 4442nd Tactical Control Group (later 505th Air Control, 505th Command and Control Evaluation): 1 March 1980 – 1 October 1997
- 4443rd Test and Evaluation Group (later 79th Test and Evaluation, 53d Test and Evaluation): 1 July 1988 – present

=== Squadrons ===
Fighter Squadrons

- 13th Pursuit Squadron (later 13th Fighter Squadron, 13th Fighter-Interceptor Squadron): 15 January 1941 – 1 May 1944; 18 August 1955 – 1 July 1957.
- 14th Pursuit Squadron (later 14th Fighter Squadron, 14th Fighter-Interceptor Squadron): 15 January 1941 – 1 May 1944; 18 August 1955 – 1 April 1960.
- 15th Pursuit Squadron (later 15th Fighter Squadron): 15 January 1941 – 1 May 1944
- 438th Fighter Squadron: 20 February 1943 – 1 May 1944

Test Squadrons

- 31st Test and Evaluation Squadron: 1 June 1992 – 15 April 1993
- 49th Test Squadron: 1 June 1992 – 15 April 1993
- 513th Test Squadron: 1 June 1992 – 15 April 1993
- 727th Tactical Control Squadron (Test): 1 October 1979 – 1 March 1980
- 3907th Systems Evaluation Squadron: 1 June 1992 – 15 April 1993
- 4484th Fighter Weapons Squadron: 1 October 1978 – 1 June 1984
- 4484th Test Squadron: 15 October 1983 – 1 August 1988
- 4485th Test Squadron: 12 April 1971 – 1 August 1988
- 4486th Fighter Weapons Squadron: 1 October 1985 – 1 August 1988, later 86th Fighter Weapons Squadron
- 4487th Electronic Warfare Aggressor (later 87th Electronic Warfare Aggressor) Squadron: 1 October 1990 – 15 April 1993

=== Flight ===
- 15th Test Flight: 1 March 2016 – 1 October 2021

=== Support Units ===
- 53rd USAF Infirmary (later 53d USAF Dispensary), 18 August 1955 – 1 April 1960
- 53rd Air Base Squadron, 18 August 1955 – 1 April 1960
- 53rd Materiel Squadron, 18 August 1955 – 1 April 1960
- 53rd Consolidated Aircraft Maintenance Squadron, 8 July 1957 – 1 May 1959

== Aircraft flown ==
- P-35 (1941)
- P-39 Airacobra (1942–1943)
- P-40 Warhawk (1941)
- P-47 Thunderbolt (1943–1944)
- P-51 Mustang (1943)
- F-86 Sabre (1955–1959)
- C-119 Flying Boxcar (1956, 1963–1973)
- C-45 Expeditor (1957)
- T-33 Shooting Star (1957, 1963–1973)
- A-4 Skyhawk (1963–1973)
- A-37 Dragonfly (1963–1973)
- B-57 Canberra (1963–1973)
- C-123 Provider (1963–1973)
- C-124 Globemaster II (1963–1973)
- H-3 Sea King (1963–1973)
- CH-21 Shawnee (1963–1973)
- F-100 Super Sabre (1963–1973)
- F-101 Voodoo (1963–1973)
- F-104 Starfighter (1963–1973)
- F-105 Thunderchief (1963–1973)
- O-1 Bird Dog (1963–1973)
- OV-10 Bronco (1963–1973)
- RB-66 Destroyer (1963–1973)
- UH-1 Iroquois (1963–1973)
- C-130 Hercules (1964–1974)
- F-111 Aardvark (1968–1978)

F-86 Sabre (1955–1959)

- RF-4 (1964–1994)
- F-5 Freedom Fighter (1965–1978)
- A-7 Corsair II (1972–1974)
- AC-130 Spectre (1972–1978)
- McDonnell Douglas F-15 Eagle (1976–present)
- General Dynamics F-16 Fighting Falcon (1978–present)
- Fairchild Republic A-10 Thunderbolt II (1978–present)
- Boeing E-3 Sentry (1980)
- SR-71 Blackbird (1986–89)
- F-15 Strike Eagle (1988-present)
- E-9 (1996–present)
- F-117 Nighthawk (1996–2008)
- HH-60 Pave Hawk (1996–present)
- HC-130J Combat King II (2010–present)
- F-22A Raptor (2010-present)
- F-35A Lightning II (2014-present)
- F-15EX Eagle II (2021-present)

=== Awards and campaigns ===
Award streamer	Award	Dates	Notes
	Air Force Outstanding Unit Award	1 June 1998 – 31 May 2000	53d Wing
	Air Force Outstanding Unit Award	1 June 2002 – 31 May 2004	53rd Wing
	Air Force Outstanding Unit Award	1 June 2004 – 31 May 2006	53rd Wing
	Air Force Organizational Excellence Award	1 January 1981 – 1 January 1983	53rd Wing
	Air Force Organizational Excellence Award	28 February 1984 – 28 February 1986	USAF Tactical Air Warfare Center
	Air Force Organizational Excellence Award	1 March 1986 – 28 February 1988	USAF Tactical Air Warfare Center
	Air Force Organizational Excellence Award	1 January 1989 – 31 December 1990	USAF Tactical Air Warfare Center
	Air Force Organizational Excellence Award	1 January 1992 – 31 December 1993	USAF Tactical Air Warfare Center
	Air Force Organizational Excellence Award	1 January 1994 – 30 April 1995	USAF Air Warfare Center

Campaign Streamer	Campaign	Dates	Notes
	Antisubmarine	7 December 1941 – 10 November 1942	53rd Pursuit Group (later 53rd Fighter Group)
