= Sioux Gateway Airport =

Sioux Gateway Airport Brigadier General Bud Day Field

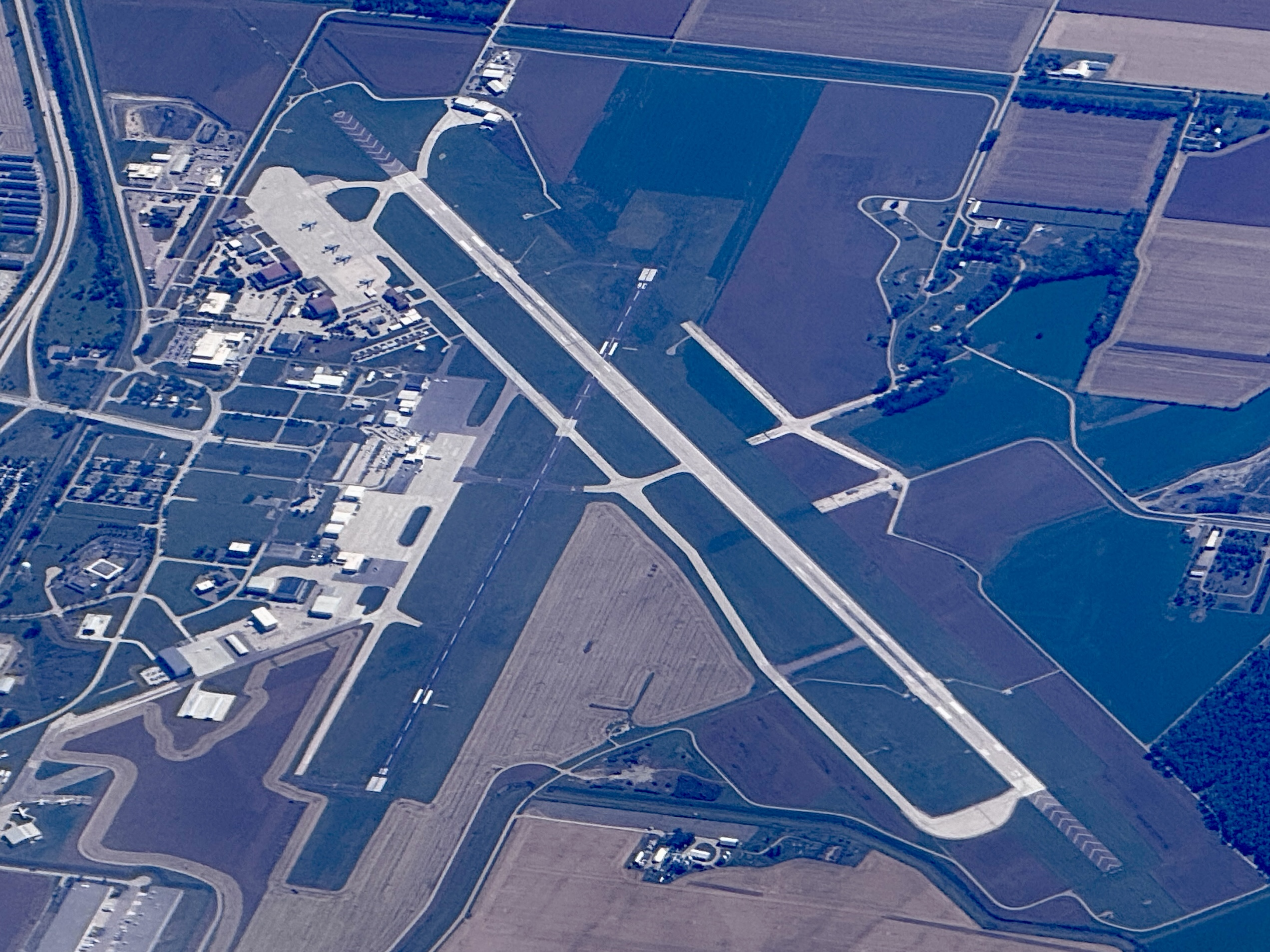
- Sioux Gateway Airport in 2025
- IATA: SUX; ICAO: KSUX; FAA LID: SUX

Summary
- Airport type: Public
- Owner: Sioux Gateway Airport Authority
- Serves: Sioux City, Iowa
- Elevation AMSL: 1,098 ft (335 m)
- Coordinates: 42°24′09″N 096°23′04″W
- Website: www.FlySUX.com

Map
- Location of airport in Iowa SUX (the United States)

Runways
Direction	Length		Surface
Direction	ft	m	Surface
13/31	9,002	2,744	Concrete
18/36	6,401	1,951	Asphalt

Statistics (2021)
- Enplanements (2020): 17,078
- Aircraft operations (year ending 12/31/2021): 19,509
- Based aircraft (2021): 66
- Source: Federal Aviation Administration

Sioux Gateway Airport (IATA: SUX, ICAO: KSUX, FAA LID: SUX), also known as Brigadier General Bud Day Field, is a public and military use airport in Woodbury County, Iowa, United States. It is located six nautical miles (7 mi, 11 km) south of the central business district of Sioux City, just west of Sergeant Bluff. On May 25, 2002, the airport was named in honor of United States Air Force Colonel George Everette "Bud" Day, a Sioux City, Iowa, native who is the only person ever awarded both the Medal of Honor and the Air Force Cross.

The National Plan of Integrated Airport Systems for 2011–2015 categorized it as a primary commercial service airport since it has over 10,000 passenger boardings (enplanements) per year. As per the Federal Aviation Administration, this airport had 28,137 enplanements in calendar year 2011, an increase of 13.91% from 24,701 in 2010.

The airport is home to the 185th Air Refueling Wing (185 ARW), an Air Mobility Command (AMC)-gained unit of the Iowa Air National Guard, flying the KC-135 Stratotanker, as well as Sioux City Air National Guard Base.

The airport is owned and operated by the city of Sioux City and governed by a seven-member Airport Board of Trustees. Airport Board members are appointed by the City Council and serve four-year terms.

== History ==
The construction of Sioux City Army Air Base began in March 1942, about three months after the Japanese attack on Pearl Harbor. Opened on July 5, 1942, it became a major training center during World War II for crewmen of B-24 Liberators and B-17 Flying Fortresses. With the end of World War II, the former training base switched to becoming a processing center to discharge personnel out of the service and back into civilian life.

Sioux City Army Air Base closed in December 1945, but in September 1946, the airfield was opened by the Air Force Reserve. Sioux City Air Base was one of the first Air Force Reserve bases established after the war, and in December 1946, the 185th Iowa Air National Guard unit was established at Sioux City. Assigned to the new Air Defense Command (ADC) upon reactivation, the 140th Army Air Force Base Unit was activated as its host organization. The mission of the 140th AAFBU was to offer flight and ground training to all commissioned and enlisted members of the Air Force Reserve residing in Iowa, Minnesota, Nebraska, South Dakota and Wyoming.

By the mid-1960s, ADC was reducing its forces, and on April 1, 1966, the 31st AD was reassigned and the airport was turned over to the Air Force Reserve and Iowa Air National Guard for limited military use.

=== SUX controversy ===
The airport designator "SUX" has been contentious, due to the name sounding identical to the slang word "sucks". (Note: Designators are intended to be pronounced one letter at a time – in this case, as "S-U-X"; however, in common parlance it is frequently pronounced "sucks", which is an American pejorative term for something not desired or desirable.) Sioux City Mayor Craig Berenstein in 2002 described SUX as an "embarrassment" to the city. After petitioning the FAA for a changed airport identifier in 1998 and 2002, authorities found the alternatives offered—GWU, GYO, GYT, SGV, and GAY—to be unappealing, and elected to stay with SUX. In October 2007, airport board member Dave Bernstein proposed embracing the identifier, saying "Let's make the best of it. I think we have the opportunity to turn it into a positive," and noting "I've got buddies that I went to college with in different cities that can't even remember their own birthdays, but they all know the Sioux City designator — SUX." The airport now sells merchandise with the words "Fly SUX".

=== Airport growth ===
For several years the only airline service was from Northwest Airlines, commuter service on Northwest Airlink to Minneapolis–Saint Paul International Airport. In October 2007, Frontier Airlines began service with two daily flights between its Denver hub and Sioux City. The new service from Frontier quickly expanded to three daily non-stop flights to Denver and helped passenger traffic increase by over 150%. In April 2008, Frontier announced it would be ending service to Sioux City on May 12, citing economic conditions after the company filed for Chapter 11 bankruptcy.

In July 2011, Delta Air Lines (who merged with Northwest in 2009) told the United States Department of Transportation that a weak economy and lower seat demand would force the company to reduce flights to several smaller communities including Sioux City unless it received assistance from the federal government. Delta said planes left Sioux Gateway with an average of only 51.4% of their seats full, so given that the company planned to remove turboprop planes and some of its 50-seat jets from service by the end of 2011 it wasn't economically viable for Delta to continue service. Of the average 75 passengers who flew the SUX–MSP route each day, only nine flew directly to the Twin Cities or to Sioux City, according to the Metropolitan Airports Commission. The majority of passengers were connecting through MSP to destinations such as Chicago, Phoenix or Orlando. Delta made its final flights into Sioux Gateway in April 2012.

American Airlines announced on December 9, 2011, that their subsidiary, American Eagle, would begin serving Sioux City from Chicago O'Hare in the spring of 2012. American ended service to Sioux City on April 5, 2021.

== Facilities and aircraft ==
Sioux Gateway Airport covers 2,460 acres (996 ha) at an elevation of 1,098 feet (335 m) above mean sea level. It has two runways: 13/31 is 9,002 by 150 feet (2,744 x 46 m) concrete and 18/36 is 6,401 by 150 feet (1,951 x 46 m) asphalt.

In June 2011, work was completed on a $6.2 million remodeling of the 58-year-old terminal building. The City of Sioux City received federal and state funds that picked up 78 percent of the $6.2 million cost to renovate the terminal building. The city received a Federal Aviation Administration grant for the new passenger loading bridge, plus $3.97 million in federal stimulus funds and a state Airport Vertical Infrastructure grant. The city's share was $1.4 million, which was about twice as much as originally estimated caused construction problems due to termite and drainage damage.

In the year ending December 31, 2021, the airport had 19,509 aircraft operations: an average of 53 per day: 51% general aviation, 25% military, 14% air taxi, and 9% airline. At that time, there were 66 aircraft based at SUX: 41 single-engine, 3 multi-engine, 11 jet, 2 helicopters, and 9 military.

== Airline and destinations ==
=== Passenger ===
Airlines	Destinations
United Express	Chicago–O'Hare, Denver

Destinations map
Destinations from Sioux Gateway Airport
Red = Year-round destination
Green = Seasonal destination

== Accidents and incidents ==
- On January 31, 1944, a United States Army Air Forces Douglas C-39 en route to Saint Joseph, Missouri, caught fire shortly after takeoff, crashed and burned. All three crew members died.
- On March 2, 1951, a Mid-Continent Airlines Douglas DC-3 crashed 500 feet short of runway 17 while attempting to land in a snowstorm. The probable cause of the crash was a stall at low altitude while turning to line up on the runway. 16 of 25 occupants were killed in the crash.
- On December 27, 1968, an airplane operating as Ozark Air Lines Flight 982 crashed while taking off from runway 35 at Sioux Gateway Airport en route to Chicago. The plane was inadequately deiced, causing it to have no control after takeoff. The plane rolled violently 90 degrees to the right and then overcorrected to a mild left bank, causing the left wing to strike the ground. The plane came to rest in a flat position 1181 feet past the runway end. There were injuries but no fatalities.
- On July 19, 1989, United Airlines Flight 232, en route from Denver-Stapleton to Philadelphia via Chicago-O'Hare, crashed at Sioux Gateway Airport while attempting an emergency landing. 111 passengers and 1 crew member were killed, while 174 passengers and 10 crew members survived. The accident was one of the most famous aviation disasters in American history, due to several factors: the nature of the incident (deemed as "unsurvivable", especially as it compared in similarity to the earlier Japan Air Lines Flight 123 crash), the skill of the crew in saving many of the occupants, the survival of so many occupants despite the circumstances and because of the media exposure. The actual footage of the crash was used three years later for the making of the Charlton Heston and James Coburn made-for-TV movie Crash Landing: The Rescue of Flight 232 (1992; also known as A Thousand Heroes) about the beginnings (and ultimate test) of the Woodbury County Disaster Services program.

== See also ==
- List of airports in Iowa
- Sioux City Transit

== Other sources ==
- Essential Air Service documents (Docket DOT-OST-2011-0131) from the U.S. Department of Transportation:
  - Order 2011-12-2 (December 8, 2011): selected American Eagle Airlines, a regional affiliate of American Airlines, to provide 13 nonstop round trips per week to each community, Sioux City and Waterloo, from Chicago O’Hare International Airport (ORD). Rate effective for a two-year period beginning when it inaugurated EAS at both communities through the end of the 24th month thereafter. The carrier inaugurated service at both communities on April 3, 2012, thus making the expiration date April 30, 2014. American Eagle was selected to provide service at Sioux City with 50-seat aircraft and 44-seat aircraft at Waterloo, with annual subsidy rates of $1,512,799 and $1,541,824, respectively.
  - Order 2014-3-14 (March 28, 2014): selecting American Airlines to provide Essential Air Service (EAS) at Sioux City and Waterloo, Iowa, for annual subsidies of $611,334 and $945,546, respectively. EAS to be Provided to Sioux City, Iowa - Effective period: May 1, 2014, through April 30, 2016. Service: 13 nonstop round trips per week to Chicago (ORD). Aircraft type: Regional jets, 44-50 seats.
- This article incorporates public domain material from the Air Force Historical Research Agency
