= Robert H. Reed =

United States Air Force general

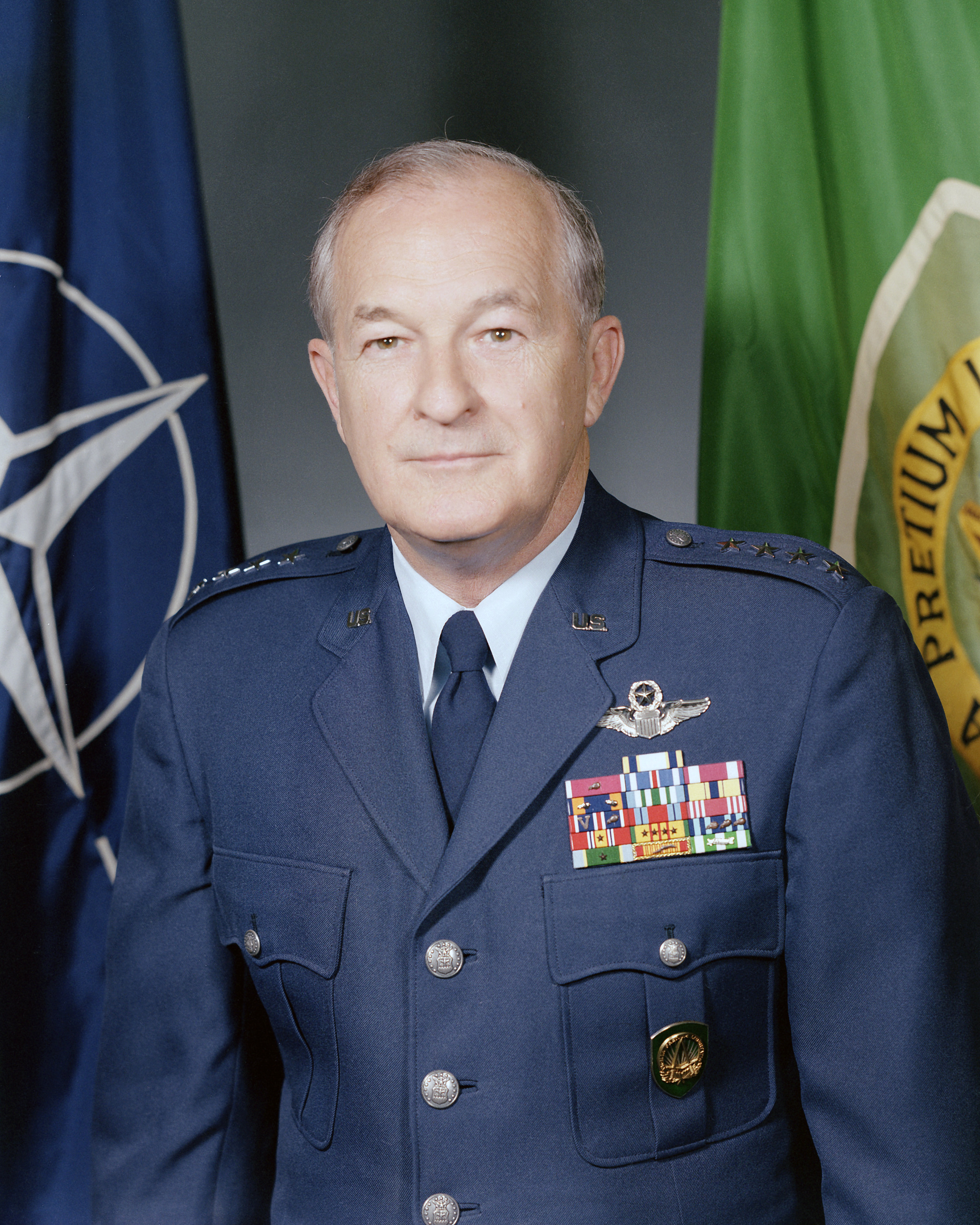
- Official portrait
- Born: October 10, 1929; Elkhorn City, Kentucky
- Died: December 24, 2017 (aged 88); Myrtle Beach, South Carolina
- Military career
- Allegiance: United States
- Branch: United States Air Force
- Service years: 1952–1988
- Rank: General
- Commands: 354th Tactical Fighter Wing; Tactical Training, Davis-Monthan; Air Defense Weapons Center; Chief of Staff Supreme Headquarters Allied Powers Europe
- Conflicts: Cold War; Korean War; Vietnam War

Robert Harvey Reed (October 10, 1929 – December 24, 2017) was a General in the United States Air Force and the former chief of staff of the Supreme Headquarters Allied Powers Europe.

== Biography ==
=== Early life ===
Reed was born in 1929, in Elkhorn City, Kentucky, and graduated from Warfield High School, in Warfield, Kentucky.

From June 1952 to June 1953 he attended pilot training at Marana Air Base, Arizona, and Williams Air Force Base, also in Arizona, as an aviation cadet. After graduating as a Second Lieutenant, he completed the F-94C Starfire All-Weather Fighter-Interceptor School at Moody Air Force Base, Georgia, and in December 1953 was assigned to the 332nd Fighter-Interceptor Squadron at New Castle Air Force Base, Delaware.

He was assigned as an F-89D Scorpion pilot to the 18th Fighter-Interceptor Squadron, Ladd Air Force Base, Alaska, in July 1954. Upon completion of his Alaskan tour of duty in July 1956, he was assigned to the 319th Fighter-Interceptor Squadron at Bunker Hill Air Force Base, Indiana. Other squadron assignments included duty as weapons director and operations officer with the 903d Aircraft Control and Warning Squadron, Gettysburg, South Dakota; 740th Aircraft Control and Warning Squadron, Ellsworth Air Force Base, South Dakota; 916th Aircraft Control and Warning Squadron, Prince George, British Columbia; and as flight commander, 49th Fighter-Interceptor Squadron, Griffiss Air Force Base, New York, where he flew F-101B Voodoo's. He earned a Bachelor of Arts degree in international relations from Syracuse University, New York, in 1959.

General Reed was assigned to Headquarters 26th Air Division at Hancock Field, New York, in June 1963 as aide-de-camp to Major General Arthur C. Agan, Jr. Upon completing Air Command and Staff College in June 1965, he was assigned to Headquarters Air Defense Command, Ent Air Force Base, Colorado. While there he served as an operations staff officer and assistant executive officer in the Office of the Deputy Chief of Staff, Operations. He also earned a master of public administration degree from The George Washington University that year.

=== Later career ===
In September 1967 he went to Richards-Gebaur Air Force Base, Missouri., where he worked for the commander, 10th Air Force, as special assistant for command planning. In July 1968 he transferred to the 479th Tactical Fighter Wing, George Air Force Base, California, and completed F-4 Phantom II combat crew training in preparation for an assignment to Southeast Asia.

The general transferred in December 1968 to the 12th Tactical Fighter Wing, Cam Ranh Bay Air Base, Republic of Vietnam, where he served as operations officer for the 557th Tactical Fighter Squadron. While there he completed 305 combat hours in F-4 Phantom IIs. After returning to the United States in December 1969, he entered F-106 Delta Dart combat crew training at Tyndall Air Force Base, Florida. He then was assigned as operations officer for the 84th Fighter-Interceptor Squadron, Hamilton Air Force Base, California.

Upon graduation from the Air War College in June 1972, he was assigned to Headquarters United States Air Force, Washington D.C., as chief, Doctrine Development Branch, and later as assistant chief, Doctrine Division, in the Directorate of Doctrine, Concepts and Objectives, Office of the Deputy Chief of Staff, Plans and Operations.

In April 1974 he was assigned to the Air Force Six Man Group. This was a special study team established by the chief of staff to investigate and advise him on matters pertaining to the development and employment of Air Force forces. Upon completion of this study effort in March 1975, he was assigned to the 354th Tactical Fighter Wing, Myrtle Beach Air Force Base, South Carolina, as vice commander. He became commander in August 1976.

Reed was assigned to Davis-Monthan Air Force Base, Arizona, in April 1979 as commander, Tactical Training, Davis-Monthan. From July 1980 to August 1982 he served at Tyndall Air Force Base as commander of the Air Defense Weapons Center. He then transferred to Headquarters Tactical Air Command, Langley Air Force Base, Virginia, as deputy chief of staff for operations. In September 1984 he became Air Force assistant vice chief of staff, Washington D.C. He also served as the Air Force representative, United States Delegation to the Military Staff Committee, United Nations. He assumed his duty as the chief of staff of the Supreme Headquarters Allied Powers Europe in June 1986. He was promoted to General July 1, 1986, with same date of rank.

== Death ==
Reed died at his home in Myrtle Beach, South Carolina, on December 24, 2017.

== Awards and decorations ==
| US Air Force Command Pilot Badge |
| SACEUR Badge |

| Air Force Distinguished Service Medal |
| Legion of Merit with one bronze oak leaf cluster |
| Distinguished Flying Cross |
| Meritorious Service Medal |
| Air Medal with ten oak leaf clusters |
| Joint Service Commendation Medal |
| Air Force Commendation Medal |
| Air Force Outstanding Unit Award with "V" device and oak leaf cluster |
| Combat Readiness Medal |
| Army Good Conduct Medal |
| National Defense Service Medal with one bronze service star |
| Vietnam Service Medal with four service stars |
| Air Force Longevity Service Award with silver and three bronze oak leaf clusters |
| Small Arms Expert Marksmanship Ribbon with service star |
| Vietnam Gallantry Cross Unit Citation |
| Vietnam Campaign Medal |

- Reed had more than 6,100 flying hours.
