= Herschel Green =

World War II flying ace (1920–2006)

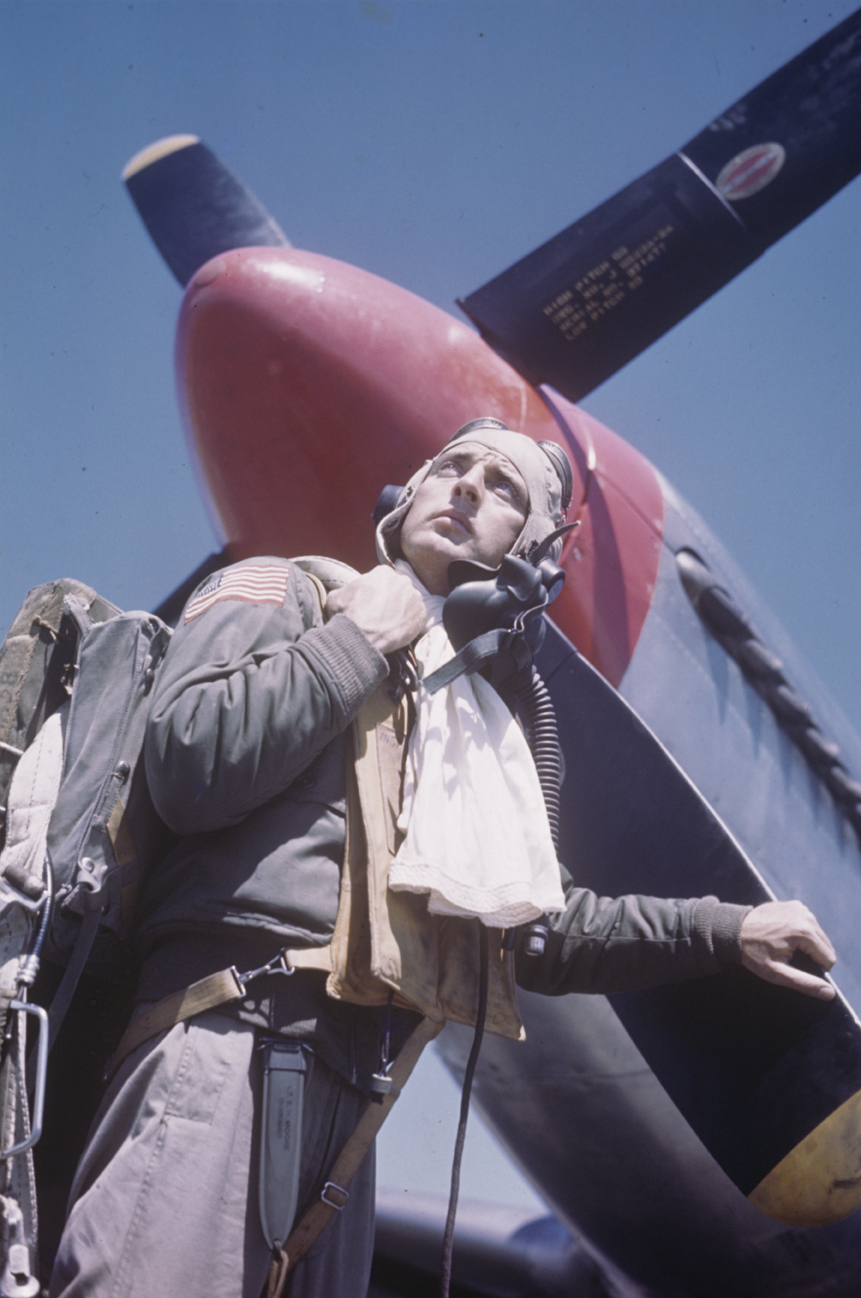
- Col. Green with his P-51 Mustang, c. 1944
- Born: July 3, 1920; Mayfield, Kentucky
- Died: August 16, 2006 (aged 86); Torrance, California
- Military career
- Allegiance: United States
- Branch: United States Army Air Forces; United States Air Force
- Service years: 1941–1964
- Rank: Colonel
- Nickname: "Herky"
- Commands: 4756th Air Defense Group; 4th Fighter Group
- Conflicts: World War II
- Awards: Distinguished Service Cross; Silver Star; Distinguished Flying Cross (2); Purple Heart; Air Medal (26); Croix de guerre (France)

Herschel Harper "Herky" Green (July 3, 1920 – August 16, 2006) was a World War II flying ace in the United States Army Air Forces. Green was the leading ace of the Fifteenth Air Force, shooting down 18 enemy aircraft and destroying 10 more on the ground.

Green was born in Mayfield, Kentucky.

== 325th Fighter Group ==
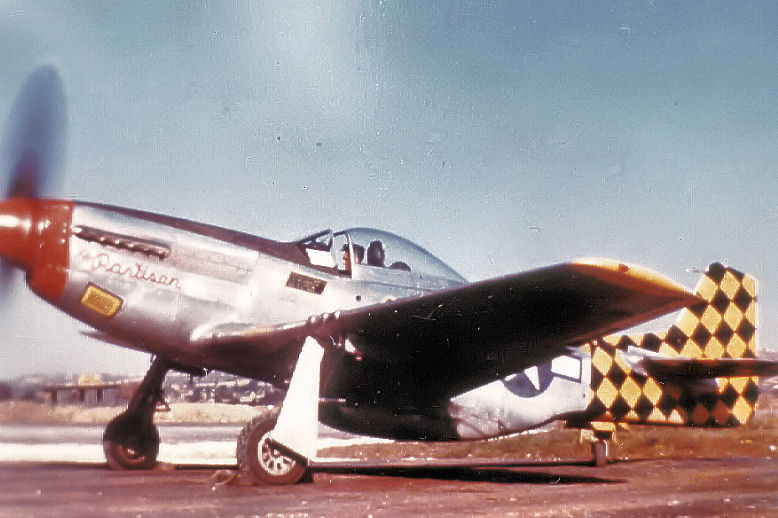
Checkertail P-51D Mustang of the 325th Fighter Group

Green flew in 1943 and 1944 in the North Africa and Italian campaigns with the 325th Fighter Group. By the end of 1944, he had flown 100 missions and received the Distinguished Service Cross, Purple Heart, Air Medal with 25 Oak Leaf Clusters, Silver Star, and two Distinguished Flying Crosses.

== Memoir ==
He published his memoir Herky!: the Memoirs of a Checkertail Ace in 1996. The "Checkertail" refers to the group's recognition markings. The tail of each aircraft was painted yellow with black squares. He died in Torrance, California, aged 86.
