= 4756th Air Defense Wing =

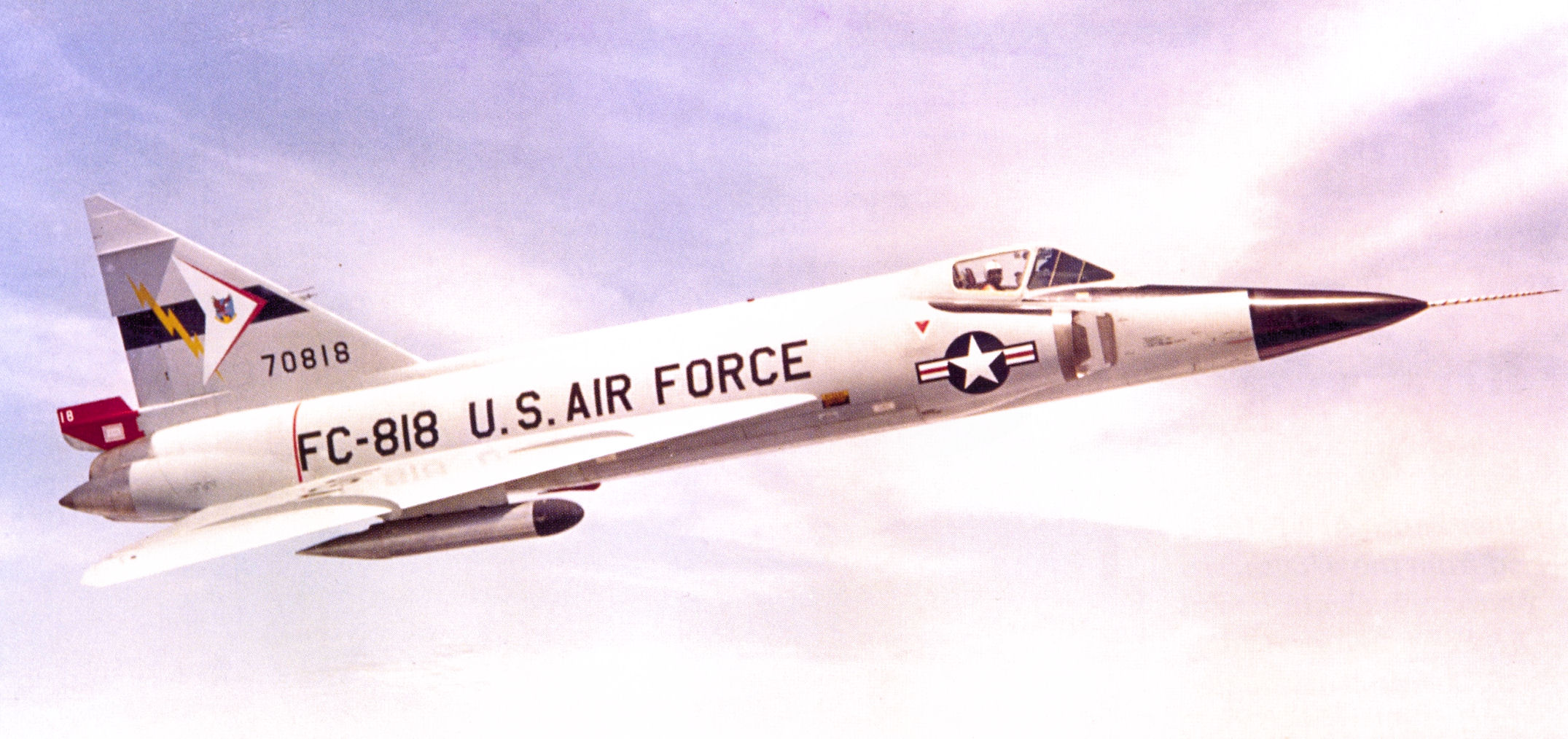
- F-102 Delta Dagger of the wing at Tyndall AFB in 1960 (Note: Aircraft is Convair F-102A-90-CO Delta Dagger, serial 57-818.)
- Active: 1957-1960; 1962-1967
- Country: United States
- Branch: United States Air Force
- Role: Air defense fighter training and weapons development

Insignia
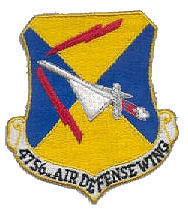
- Patch showing 4756th Air Defense Wing emblem

The 4756th Air Defense Wing was the designation of two different discontinued United States Air Force organizations. (Note: Cornett & Johnson refer to this as a reactivation, however under USAF organizational rules at the time, the wing was a MAJCON (4-digit) unit and the lineage of the first 4756th Air Defense Wing had been terminated and could not be revived. Ravenstein, Guide to Air Force Lineage and Honors, p. 12. (An updated, but abbreviated, version of this work is available at A Guide to USAF Lineage and Honors).) Both wings were stationed at Tyndall Air Force Base, Florida and fulfilled similar missions. The first was organized in 1957 when Air Defense Command (ADC) assumed responsibility for managing Tyndall from Air Training Command and focused on weapons testing and development and evaluating the readiness of ADC fighter units. The wing also controlled a ground control intercept radar squadron. This wing was discontinued in 1960 and its mission transferred to its parent 73d Air Division.

The second wing was organized in 1962. It also conducted testing, but focused on crew training for interceptor aircraft. During the Cuban Missile Crisis, the wing also assumed an alert state at bases in Florida. This wing was discontinued in 1968 and its mission transferred to the Air Defense Weapons Center, which had replaced the 73d Air Division at Tyndall in 1966.

== History ==
=== First wing ===
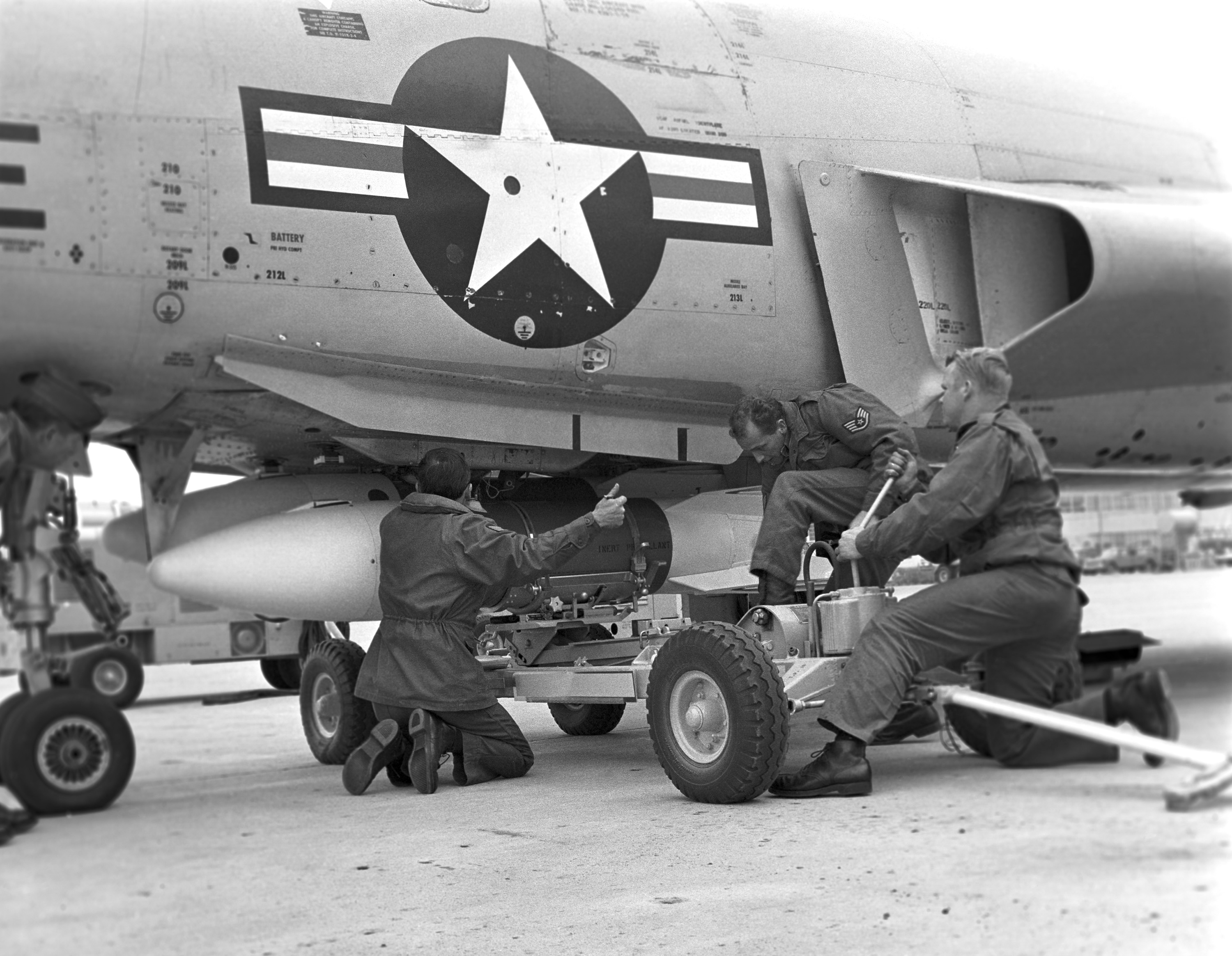
Loading an AIR-2 Genie on an F-101 at Tyndall AFB during a William Tell weapons meet

The first wing was organized in 1957, when Tyndall Air Force Base was transferred from Air Training Command to Air Defense Command (ADC). It assumed the mission, personnel and equipment of ATC's 3625th Combat Crew Training Wing, which was discontinued. The primary mission of the wing was to conduct air defense weapons employment and testing. It also provided combat crew training on the Lockheed F-104 Starfighter until ADC released all its F-104s to the ANG in 1960 because the F-104A fire control system was not sophisticated enough to make it an all weather interceptor. From 1957 until 1959, the wing also controlled the 678th Aircraft Control & Warning Squadron, which performed the radar aircraft detection, warning, and control mission. In addition to the mission units listed below, the wing was assigned various support and maintenance units to carry out its mission as host unit for Tyndall. Between 1960 when the wing was discontinued and 1962, most of the wing's units were reassigned directly to the 73d Air Division (Weapons).

A major responsibility of wing was to evaluate the readiness and effectiveness of ADC fighter-interceptor squadrons which were required to spend one month each year undergoing evaluation exercises at Tyndall. As part of this mission the 4756th also conducted the annual worldwide interceptor weapons meet called "William Tell." The wing participated, along with Air Proving Ground Command, in developing the initial operational testing and development of tactics for the Convair F-102 Delta Dagger aircraft.

=== Second wing ===
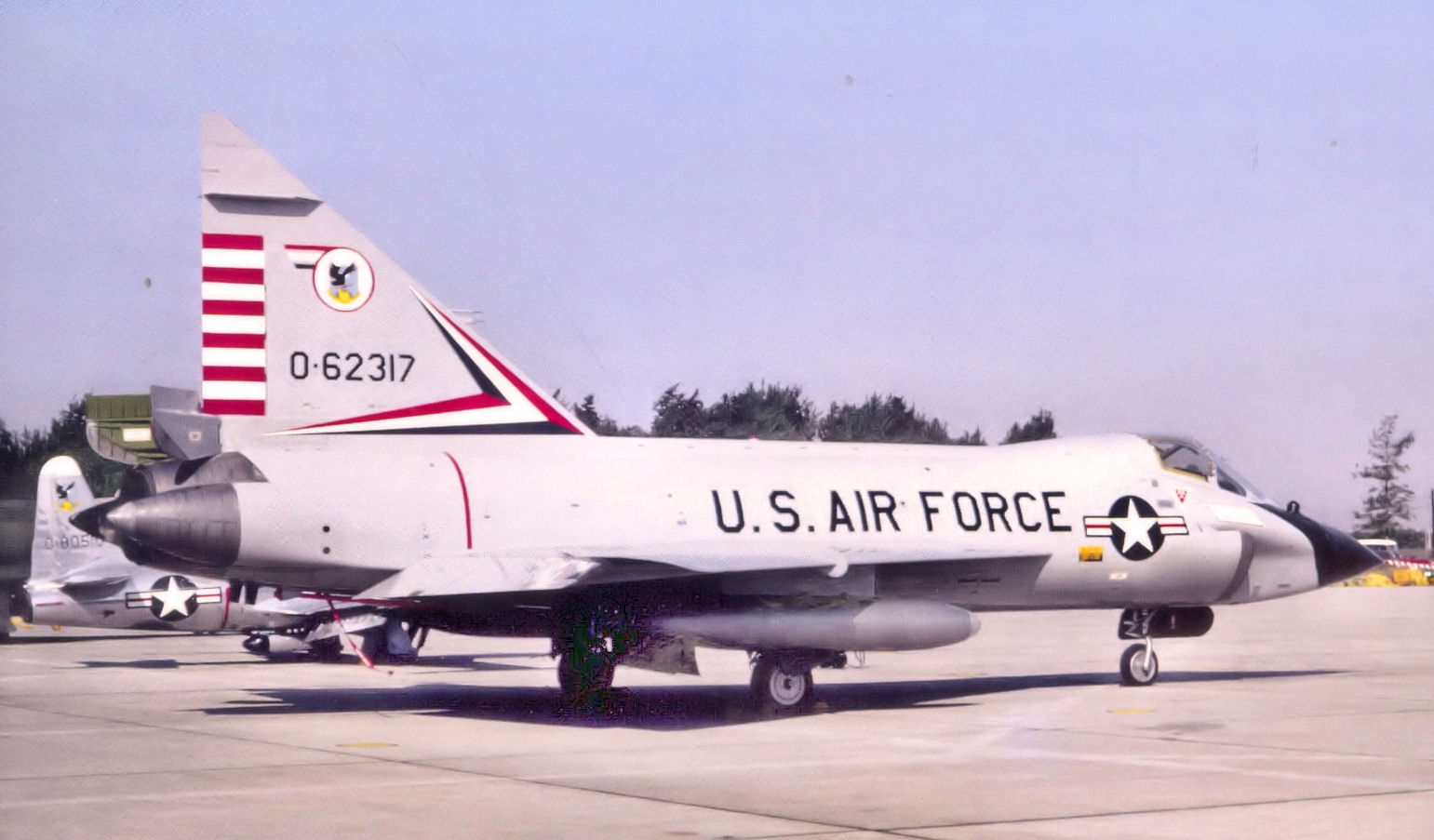
TF-102A Delta Dagger at Tyndall AFB (Note: Aircraft is Convair TF-102A-38-CO Delta Dagger, serial 56-2317, taken in 1968. This aircraft was later converted to a PQM-102 drone and used for testing drone control equipment. In 2006, it was put on display at the Grissom Air Museum. Dirkx, Marco (23 September 2025). "1956 USAF Serial Numbers". Joe Baugher’s Serial Number List.)

The second wing provided interceptor combat crew training for McDonnell F-101 Voodoo and Convair F-106 Delta Dart aircrews, interceptor aircraft weapons training, and conducted operational testing and evaluation of crewed interceptors, fire-control systems, and armament. The wing was ADC's only unit conducting live firing and operating target control systems after the 4750th Air Defense Wing at Vincent Air Force Base, Arizona was discontinued.

Following the Cuban Revolution, the Joint Chiefs of Staff developed a plan for reinforcing air defenses in southern Florida, named Operation Southern Tip. On 7 April 1961 the JCS tested Operation Southern Tip in which the 4756th wing deployed six F-102s to Homestead Air Force Base, where they stood five minute alert. The same month the Bay of Pigs Invasion occurred and the JCS decided not to terminate the exercise, but to retain the aircraft at Homestead. In July, the number of aircraft was reduced to four and the 482d Fighter-Interceptor Squadron assumed the alert mission from the wing.

During the Cuban Missile Crisis in 1962, elements of the wing at Tyndall also assumed an air defense alert mission. Initially, a total of 60 F-101, F-102 and F-106 aircraft at Tyndall were placed on alert. On 19 November, however, these airplanes were released to resume training and testing except for eight F-102s and TF-102s that remained on strip alert

After the crisis, the wing established a detachment at Key West Naval Air Station to perform the air defense alert mission. The second wing was discontinued at the start of 1968 and its mission transferred to the Air Defense Weapons Center.

== Lineage ==
- Designated as the 4756th Air Defense Wing (Weapons) and organized on 1 July 1957

Discontinued on 1 July 1960

- Designated as 4756th Air Defense Wing, (Training) and organized on 1 September 1962

Discontinued on 1 January 1968

=== Assignments ===
- 73d Air Division, 1 July 1957 - 1 July 1960
- 73d Air Division, 1 September 1962
- Fourteenth Air Force, 1 April 1966 - 1 January 1968

=== Stations ===
- Tyndall Air Force Base, Florida, 1 July 1957 - 1 July 1960
- Tyndall Air Force Base, Florida, 1 September 1962 - 1 January 1968

=== Components ===
- USAF Interceptor Weapons School, 1 July 1957 – 1 July 1960
- 4756th Air Defense Group (Weapons), 1 July 1957 – 1 July 1960
- 678th Aircraft Control and Warning Squadron, 1 April 1957 – 1 November 1959

- 4756th Air Defense Group (Weapons), 1 September 1962 – 1 January 1963
- 4756th Drone Squadron, 1 January 1963 – 1 January 1968
- 4756th Flying Training Squadron, 11 March 1967 – 1 January 1968
- 4756th Operations Squadron, 11 March 1967 – 1 January 1968
- 4757th Air Defense Squadron, 1 January 1963 – 1 January 1968

=== Commanders ===
- Col. Dean Davenport, 1 July 1957 - after December 1958
- Col. Klem F. Kalberer, 1 September 1962 - after January 1963
- Col. William D. Harris, unknown - 1966
- Col. Thomas D. DeJarnette, 1966 - after January 1967

== See also ==
- List of MAJCOM wings of the United States Air Force
- List of United States Air Force aircraft control and warning squadrons
