= 4750th Air Defense Wing =

US Air Force unit

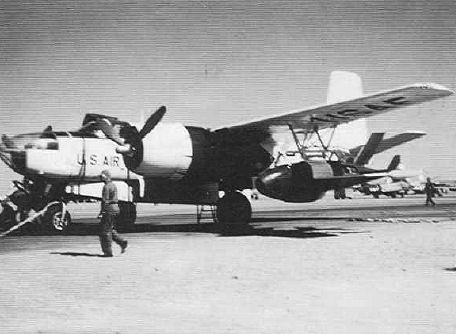
- A B-26 Invader of the 4750th with a Ryan Firebee drone under its wing
- Active: 1953-1959
- Country: United States
- Branch: United States Air Force
- Type: Interceptor weapons training
- Role: Air defense
- Decorations: Air Force Outstanding Unit Award

Commanders
- Notable commander: Colonel Robert P. Baldwin

Insignia
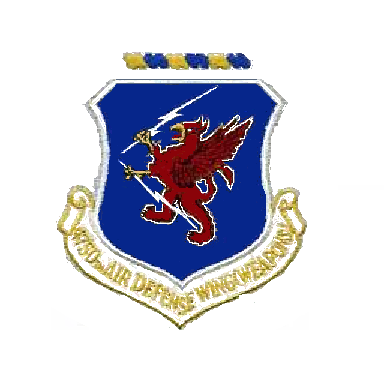
- 4750th Air Defense Wing emblem

The 4750th Air Defense Wing is a discontinued United States Air Force unit. It was last assigned to the 73d Air Division, Air Defense Command (ADC) at MacDill Air Force Base, Florida, where it was inactivated in 1960.

The wing was first organized as the 4750th Training Wing at Yuma County Airport in 1953, when ADC's gunnery training program expanded from a squadron sized unit to a wing. The wing conducted interceptor aircraft training for ADC at Yuma (later Vincent Air Force Base) until moving to MacDill in 1959. Shortly afterward, the wing was discontinued and the ADC training program transferred to another wing.

== History ==
The wing was established at Yuma County Airport in September 1953 as the 4750th Training Wing (Air Defense) when the Air Defense Command fighter gunnery training program there expanded. The gunnery program had been established at Yuma when the 4750th Air Base Squadron (Gunnery Training) was organized in 1951. The squadron had expanded to group strength in 1952 and was assigned to the wing when the wing was organized The wing specialized in air-to-air weapons training and testing for Air Defense Command. The wing also acted as the USAF host organization for Vincent Air Force Base.

After 1953, gunnery training at Yuma ended and the base concentrated on air-to-air rocketry, as it developed tactics to be employed in air-to-air rocket firing. The 4750th conducted a project on night rocket firing in 1955. The wing also participated in Exercise Checkpoint, a joint exercise with Strategic Air Command (SAC) in which wing aircraft attempted to intercept and "destroy" SAC bombers simulating an attack on the southwestern United States. In February 1955, the wing was assigned a second group, the 4756th Air Defense Group, which was stationed across the country at Moody Air Force Base, Georgia. Rocketry training for Northrop F-89 Scorpions and Lockheed F-94 Starfires moved to Moody, while that for North American F-86D Sabres remained at Yuma.

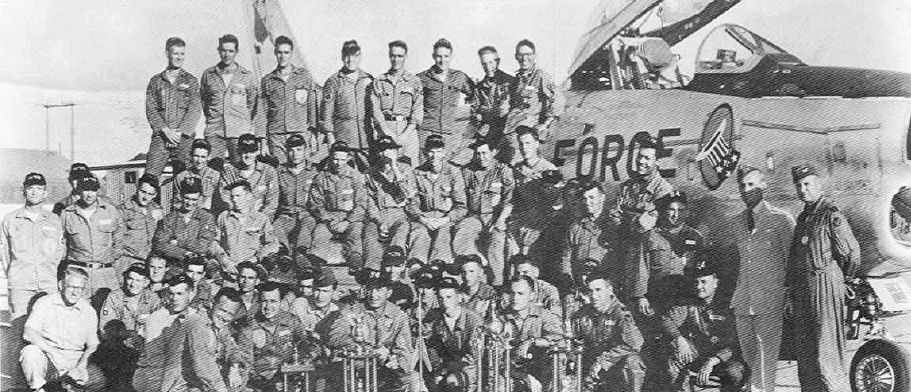
Winners of the 1956 ADC gunnery meet

Beginning in 1955, the wing hosted the interceptor phase of the worldwide fighter aircraft gunnery and weapons meet (later called William Tell), which was designed to provide information to evaluate combat readiness, tactical capabilities of aircraft and weapons and effectiveness of interceptor techniques. The meet moved to Tyndall Air Force Base, Florida in 1958.

In 1958, the wing conducted research testing for the use of special weapons by fighter aircraft. The wing moved from Arizona to Florida in 1959. and was discontinued a year later, with most of its functions being assumed by the 4756th Air Defense Wing.

== Lineage ==
- Designated as the 4750th Training Wing (Air Defense) and organized on 1 September 1953

Redesignated 4750th Air Defense Wing (Weapons) on 1 September 1954
Discontinued 25 June 1960

=== Assignments ===
- Western Air Defense Force, September 1953
- Air Defense Command, 1 October 1953
- 73d Air Division, 1 July 1957 – 25 June 1960

=== Stations ===
- Yuma County Airport, Arizona (later Yuma Air Force Base, Vincent Air Force Base), 1 September 1953
- MacDill Air Force Base, Florida, 1 June 1959 - 25 June 1960

=== Subordinate Units ===
==== Groups ====
- 4750th Air Defense Group (Weapons)

Designated as the 4750th Air Base Squadron (Gunnery Training), organized at Yuma County Airport, and assigned to the 1st Fighter-Interceptor Wing on 7 June 1951
Redesignated as the 4750th Air Base Group (Weapons Training) on 2 June 1952 and reassigned to Western Air Defense Force
Redesignated as the 4750th Training Group (Air Defense) on 16 February 1953
Redesignated as the 4750th Air Base Group and reassigned to the 4750th Training Wing on 1 September 1953
Redesignated as the 4750th Air Defense Group (Weapons) on 1 September 1954
Discontinued on 1 April 1959

- 4756th Air Defense Group (Weapons)

Organized at Moody Air Force Base, Georgia and assigned to the 4750th Air Defense Wing on 18 February 1955
Reassigned to the 4756th Air Defense Wing on 1 July 1957

==== Squadrons ====
- 17th Tow Target Squadron

Activated 3 January 1955 with personnel and equipment from the 4750th Tow Target Squadron and assigned to the 4750th Air Defense Group
Reassigned to the 4750th Air Defense Wing on 1 October 1958
Moved to MacDill Air Force Base, Florida on 11 June 1959
Inactivated and discontinued on 15 June 1960

- 4750th Air Defense Squadron

Designated as the 4750th Training Squadron (Weapons) and assigned to the 4750th Air Base Group on 1 June 1952
Redesignated as the 4750th Training Squadron (Air Defense), 1 September 1953
Redesignated as the 4750th Air Defense Squadron (Weapons), 1 September 1954
Reassigned to the 4750th Air Defense Wing on 1 October 1958
Moved to MacDill Air Force Base, Florida on 11 June 1959
Discontinued on 25 June 1960

- 4750th Drone Squadron

Designated, organized and assigned to the 4750th Air Defense Group on 1 January 1956
Reassigned to the 4750th Air Defense Wing on 1 October 1958
Moved to Tyndall Air Force Base, Florida on 25 June 1959
Discontinued on 1 October 1959

- 4750th Test Squadron

Designated as the 4750th Test Squadron (Tactical & Application Engineering), organized and assigned to the 4750th Air Defense Wing on 1 September 1956
Reassigned to the 73rd Air Division and moved to Tyndall Air Force Base, Florida on 7 July 1957

- 4750th Tow Target Squadron

Designated as the 4750th Support Squadron, organized and assigned to the 4750th Air Defense Group on 1 April 1954
Redesignated as the 4750th Tow Target Squadron on 1 September 1954
Discontinued on 8 January 1955 and personnel and equipment transferred to the 17th Tow Target Squadron (Note: In addition to these operational squadrons, the 4750th Air Defense Wing had several maintenance and supply squadrons assigned. Cornett & Johnson, pp. 143-44.)

=== Commanders ===
- Col. Robert F. Worley, 1 September 1953 – 1956
- Col. Milton H. Ashkins, 1956-after 30 June 1956
- Col. Robert P. Baldwin, by 1 July 1958 – 27 October 1958
- Col. Benjamin H. King, 27 October 1958-after 31 December 1958

=== Awards ===
| Award streamer | Award | Dates | Notes |
|---|---|---|---|
| | Air Force Outstanding Unit Award | 1 September 1953 - 1 November 1957 | |

== See also ==
- List of F-86 Sabre units
- F-89 Scorpion units of the United States Air Force
- F-94 Starfire units of the United States Air Force
