= Robert P. Baldwin =

American flying ace

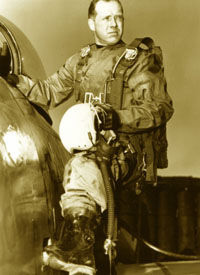
- Robert Baldwin on the wing of an F-86 Sabrejet
- Born: 19 October 1917; Los Angeles, California, U.S.
- Died: 7 April 1994 (aged 76); San Marcos, California, U.S.
- Burial place: Fort Rosecrans National Cemetery, San Diego, California
- Military career
- Allegiance: United States
- Branch: United States Army Air Forces; United States Air Force
- Service years: 1940–1966
- Rank: Colonel
- Commands: 51st Fighter-Interceptor Group
- Conflicts: World War II; Korean War
- Awards: Silver Star; Legion of Merit (2); Distinguished Flying Cross (2); Air Medal (5); Distinguished Flying Cross (United Kingdom)

Robert P. Baldwin (October 19, 1917 – April 7, 1994) spent his career in the Army Air Forces and the United States Air Force. He was a pilot during World War II and the Korean War, becoming a flying ace in Korea, shooting down five enemy aircraft.

== Military career ==
=== World War II ===
Robert Baldwin entered the Aviation Cadet Program of the U.S. Army Air Corps on September 28, 1939, and was commissioned a second lieutenant and awarded his pilot wings at Kelly Field, Texas, on June 22, 1940. During the war, he took part in 75 combat missions, flying P-38s and P-40s in Europe from 1943 to 1945. in May 1945 he was a lieutenant colonel, commanding the 71st Fighter Squadron based at March Field, California.

=== Korean War chronology ===
In 1948, Col. Robert Baldwin served as a military observer in Palestine. From December 1948 to July 1949, he server as Assistant Deputy for Maintenance and Chief of Flight Operations at Headquarters Oklahoma City Air Material Area at Tinker AFB, Oklahoma. From July to December 1949, he attended Air Command and Staff College at Maxwell AFB, Alabama. He then became commander of the 56th Maintenance and Support Group at Selfridge Air Force Base, Michigan until March 1950. Following that, he served Deputy for Operations of the 56th Fighter-Interceptor Wing, also at Selfridge AFB. In June 1951, he became Staff of Headquarters Air Defense Command at Ent Air Force Base, Colorado until February 1953. At that point, he joined the 51st Fighter-Interceptor Wing in Korea and was promoted to Commander after 3 missions. He flew a total of 85 combat missions, and had 800 hours on the F-86. He achieved 5 aerial victories plus 3 damaged in the Korean War.

=== Cold War chronology ===
From September 1953 until June 1955, he was commander of Kisarazu Air Base in Japan. Following that, he served as commander of the 4750th Air Defense Group at Vincent AFB, Arizona. In November 1958, he was stationed at the U.S. Air Force Headquarters in the Pentagon. In June 1962, he served as staff of Headquarters Allied Air Forces Southern Europe. In July 1965, he served his final assignment as Assistant Deputy Chief of Staff for Plans with Headquarters Air Training Command at Randolph AFB, Texas. He retired from the service in June 1966.

== Decorations ==
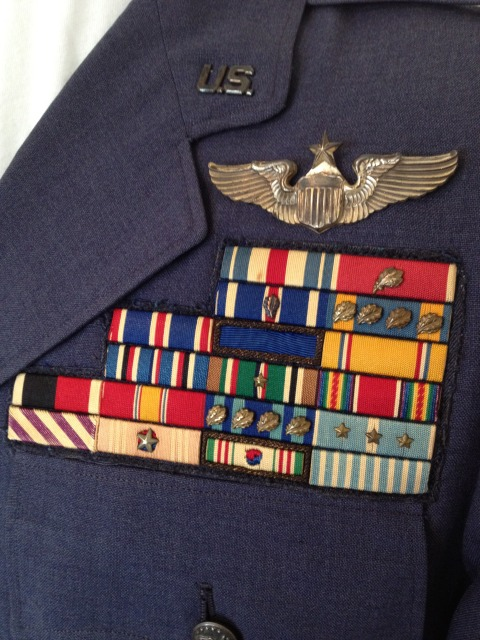
Colonel Baldwin's ribbon rack on his service dress uniform.

Baldwin was awarded the following decorations for his military service.

=== Silver Star citation ===
Silver Star Medal
The President of the United States of America, authorized by Act of Congress, July 9, 1918, takes pleasure in presenting the Silver Star to Colonel Robert P. Baldwin, United States Air Force, for gallantry in action while serving as Pilot of an F-86 Fighter Airplane and Commanding Officer of the 51st Fighter-Interceptor Group, in action on 22 June 1953, in Korea. Colonel Baldwin distinguished himself while leading four (4) F-86 type aircraft on a fighter sweep along the Manchurian Border. He sighted four (4) enemy MIG-15 type aircraft pressing an attack against two (2) friendly aircraft and immediately led his flight into the enemy. After successfully breaking up the enemy attack, Colonel Baldwin rolled down on the trailing MIG and fired a short burst into his left wing and fuselage. Colonel Baldwin continued to score numerous hits as heavy smoke poured from both wings and the enemy aircraft went into a steep dive through the clouds. Colonel Baldwin followed him through the cloud layer and pulled up sharply to avoid hitting the ground. Later reports confirmed the destruction of the MiG. By his personal courage and exceptional flying ability in this action, Colonel Baldwin is credited with destroying his fifth (5th) MIG-15 type aircraft. Throughout his tour, Colonel Baldwin's aggressive spirit and mental alertness have brought great credit upon himself and the United States Air Force.

Action Date: 22-Jun-53
Service: Air Force
Rank: Colonel
Company: Commanding Officer
Regiment: 51st Fighter-Interceptor Group

== See also ==
- List of Korean War flying aces

== Sources ==
- Gurney, Gene (1958), Five Down and Glory: A History of the American Air Ace, New York: G.P. Putnam's Sons, ISBN 0-405-03764-3, Arno Press edition
- Varhola, Michael J. (2000), Fire and Ice: The Korean War, 1950–1953, Mason City, IA: Da Capo Press, ISBN 978-1-882810-44-4
