= Air Defense, Tactical Air Command =

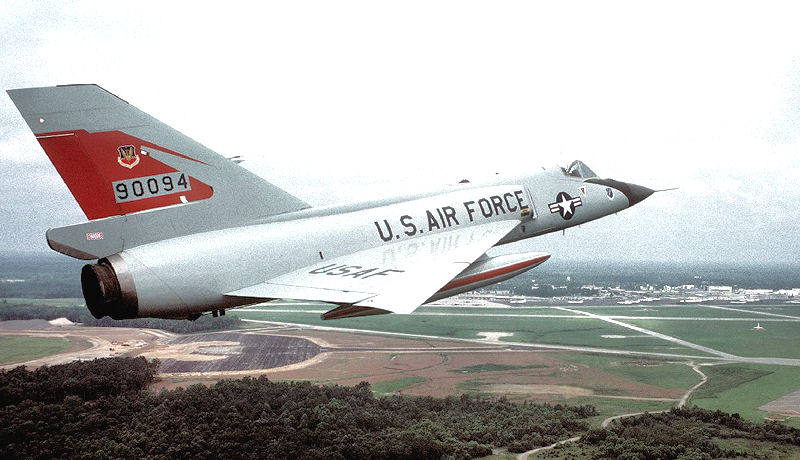
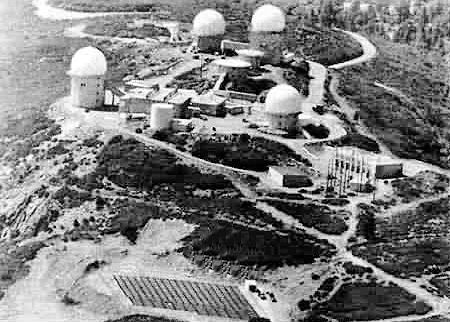
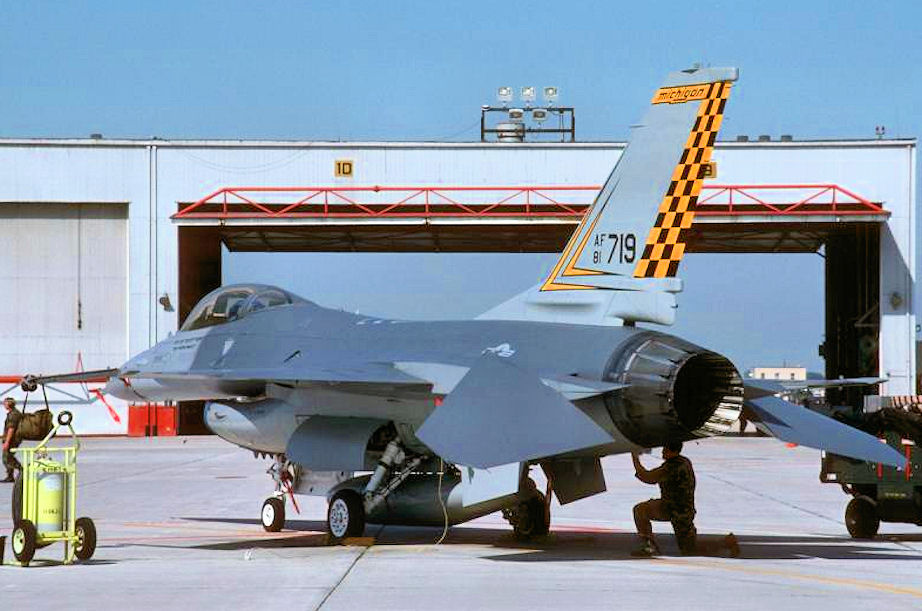
- 87th Fighter-Interceptor Squadron F-106, AF Ser. No. 59-0094, from K.I. Sawyer AFB, Michigan, in flight in the early 1980s. Note the Tactical Air Command emblem on the tail 751st Radar Squadron, Mount Laguna Air Force Station, California, 1980 171st Fighter-Interceptor Squadron, Michigan ANG, F-16A Block 15 Air Defense Fighter, about 1985
- Active: 1 October 1979 – 6 December 1985
- Country: United States
- Branch: United States Air Force
- Part of: Tactical Air Command
- Garrison/HQ: Langley AFB, Virginia

Insignia
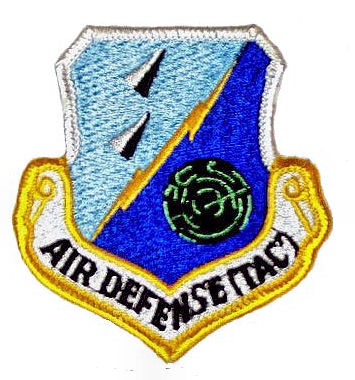
- Emblem of Air Defense, Tactical Air Command (ADTAC)

Air Defense, Tactical Air Command (ADTAC) was a Named Unit of the United States Air Force, and operated at the Numbered Air Force echelon of Tactical Air Command. It was responsible for the air defense of the United States, and was last stationed at Langley Air Force Base, Virginia. It was last assigned to Tactical Air Command, and was inactivated on 6 December 1985.

ADTAC was established when the Aerospace Defense Command (ADCOM) was inactivated as a Major Command on 1 October 1979. Aerospace Defense Command's atmospheric defense resources (interceptors, warning radars, and associated bases and personnel) were subsequently transferred to ADTAC. The command was, essentially, a transition organization between the Aerospace Defense Command, and the transfer of the air defense mission from the USAF to the Air National Guard in 1990.

It consisted of over 25,000 military and civilian personnel performing duty at radar sites, missile warning stations, fighter interceptor bases, satellite tracking centers, and command and control centers throughout the world. The command had the responsibility to provide operationally ready interceptor aircraft and aircrews for air defense alert 24 hours per day, 365 days per year. These assets had to be capable of scrambling to identify and assist or engage unidentified or hostile airborne objects approaching or entering United States airspace without proper approval. These scrambles were initiated from the respective region headquarters based on information derived from radar site data and previously known or expected airborne traffic. During increased states of readiness, these same ADTAC assets would provide additional air defense forces to CINCNORAD to provide early warning information, attack assessment, and air defense of North America. During peacetime operations, the mission of ADTAC was to command, train, manage, and evaluate forces required for the above-mentioned air defense contingencies. In doing so, the tasks of preparing budget proposals, acquiring equipment, and providing support requirements, were essential to providing ready air defense forces.

== Components ==
- Subordinate to the ADTAC headquarters element were six air defense air divisions (20th, 21st, 23d, 24th, 25th and 26th), Air Forces Iceland, the Distant Early Warning Line, and the Air Defense Weapons Center The six air division commanders also functioned as the NORAD region commanders for their particular regions during wartime operations. Each air division had responsibility for a specific area of the country.
- Each air division was commanded from a Semi Automatic Ground Environment (SAGE) blockhouse, which housed the division's command and control center, plus associated air defense radar and computer hardware. There were 80 Long Range Radars (LRRs) and 21 radar squadrons in the SAGE radar site system.
- Subordinate to each air division were assigned fighter interceptor squadrons. The fighter units allocated to ADTAC consisted of seven Air Force and 10 Air National Guard units. The Air Force fighter squadrons were equipped with F-4 Phantom II and F-106 Delta Dart aircraft. The Air National Guard units had the F-101 Voodoo, F-4 Phantom II, and the F-106 Delta Dart.
- The Distant Early Warning Line provided early warning of attack from a system of 31 radar sites stretching from Alaska to Greenland.
- The Air Defense Weapons Center was the primary location for training air defense forces. F-106 and T-33 pilot and instructor pilot training, as well as weapons controller training, was conducted here. Tactics research and development and weapons system evaluation were important aspects of the Weapons Center's mission.
- ADTAC also acquired two Martin EB-57 Canberra electronic faker aircraft units, one Air Force and one Air National Guard, each with the mission of providing electronic countermeasure training. By flying simulated target missions to test radar sites, command and control facilities, as well as interceptor aircrew performance, these units provided additional valuable training for strategic air defense forces.

== Realignments ==
HQ ADTAC remained at Peterson AFB, Colorado to direct the transition into TAC, which was eventually moved to Langley AFB in July 1981. In essence, Tactical Air Command became the old Continental Air Command (ConAC), of which, TAC and Air Defense Command were part of during the postwar years.

In 1979 there were fewer than 100 long-range aircraft detection radars covering the United States, Alaska, Canada, and Iceland, The old SAGE (Semi Automatic Ground Environment) System with its 1950 vintage computers and radar sites, was being replaced by the JSS (Joint Surveillance System) in 1983 using modern technology computer technology and joint-use (Federal Aviation Agency and Air Force) radar sites. The Joint Surveillance System would consist of radars, Regional Operations Control Centers (ROCCs), and communications and support facilities. The ROCCs would be phased in to replace the SAGE blockhouses as command and control centers. The old SAGE system was designed for both peacetime and wartime functions. The JSS/ROCC system was designed primarily for peacetime, or until the tactical situation required transfer of control to an E-3A Airborne Warning and Control System (AWACS) designated for air defense. The six continental U.S. SAGE centers were to be replaced by four ROCCs. Two additional ROCCs were planned, one by the Canadians for the defense of Canada, and one for Alaska. The 552d Airborne Warning and Control Wing, located at Tinker AFB, Oklahoma, was part of Tactical Air Command and supplied E-3A AWACS aircraft for strategic air defense purposes.

Interceptor aircraft transferred to ADTAC during the reorganization consisted of F-101 Voodoo, F-106 Delta Dart, and F-4 Phantom II fighters. The F-101 was the oldest and was possessed by three Air National Guard units, plus the Air Defense Weapons Center at Tyndall AFB. The F-101s at Tyndall were used mainly as simulated target aircraft employing electronic counter measures (ECM) and for towing targets for testing and training. Due to its age and problems in supporting the F-101, it was soon deleted from the inventory. By the fall of 1982, all F-101s, including those at Tyndall, had been retired; and, except for those at Tyndall, had been replaced by the F-4 Phantom II. The F-4 and F-106 remained in the interceptor inventory. The F-4 was possessed by Air National Guard squadrons and the 57th Fighter Interceptor Squadron in Iceland. The F-106 was possessed by Air Force and Air Guard squadrons. Modification of the F-106 through the years had improved its fire control system in an attempt to keep it up-to-date, but did not update its armament except for the addition of a gun. TAC planned the eventual conversion of all the Air Force F-106 squadrons to the F-15 Eagle and F-4 units to the F-16 Fighting Falcon Air Defense Fighter (ADF) variant. The two squadrons of EB-57 Canberra aircraft transferred to ADTAC were retired from the inventory by 1983. These aircraft were previously used for target training missions and electronic countermeasure training.

Both active-duty and Air National Guard squadrons under state control were administratively assigned to TAC though their state ANG control for the air defense mission. On 9 December 1985 these ADTAC Air Division units were placed under the newly activated First Air Force at Langley AFB, VA, which later moved to Tyndall AFB, FL in 1991. This arrangement remained in effect until the last F-106 was retired by the 177th FIG of the New Jersey Air National Guard and all Regular Air Force and ANG F-101 and F-106 units had transitioned to either the F-4, the F-15 or the F-16.

The Air Defense Weapons Center at Tyndall AFB, Florida was reorganized and a new organization was activated, the 325th Fighter Weapons Wing (FWW). The 325th FWW, through its subordinate units, conducted an extensive training program for air defense aircrews and weapons controllers; the USAF Interceptor Weapons School (IWS) trained instructors in all phases of interceptor weapons systems and employment. F-106 training was conducted by the 2d Fighter Interceptor Training Squadron (FITS). This unit was re-designated the 2d Fighter Weapons Squadron (FWS) on 1 February 1982. The 2nd FWS's mission continued to be F-106 training with plans to convert to the F-15 Eagle starting in the fall of 1983. All continental USAF sub-scale and full-scale drone aerial target operations were consolidated in the 82d Tactical Aerial Targets Squadron (TATS). The Weapons Center's drone facilities, proximity to the Gulf of Mexico air-to-air gunnery ranges, and experienced personnel, made it compatible with many of TAC's training programs.

== Transfer to Air National Guard ==
The 20th and 21st Air Divisions were inactivated on 1 March and 23 September 1983 and their assets merged into other Air Divisions. On 6 December 1985 First Air Force was re-activated by TAC and assumed the assets of ADTAC, which was inactivated.

- Air Forces Iceland was transferred to First Air Force on 6 December 1985

== Table of Organization ==
see: Distant Early Warning Line for information on the DEW chain of early warning radar stations in Alaska, Canada, Greenland and Iceland.

- Headquarters, Air Defense, Tactical Air Command

Langley AFB, Virginia

- 20th Air Division/NORAD Region

Fort Lee AFS, Virginia

Interceptor Squadrons:

48th Fighter-Interceptor Squadron (Inactivated 1991), Langley AFB, VA
119th Fighter-Interceptor Squadron, NJ ANG, Atlantic City, NJ
159th Fighter-Interceptor Squadron, FL ANG, Jacksonville, FL

Radar Squadrons:

660th Radar Squadron (Inactivated 1980), MacDill AFB, FL
671st Radar Squadron (Inactivated 1980), NAS Key West, FL
679th Radar Squadron (Inactivated 1981), NAS Jacksonville, FL
701st Radar Squadron (Inactivated 1988), Fort Fisher AFS, NC
770th Radar Squadron (Inactivated 1980), Fort George G. Meade, MD
771st Radar Squadron (Inactivated 1981), Cape Charles AFS, VA
792d Radar Squadron (Inactivated 1980), North Charleston AFS, SC

- 21st Air Division/NORAD Region

Hancock Field, Syracuse, New York

Interceptor Squadrons:

49th Fighter-Interceptor Squadron (Inactivated 1987), Griffiss AFB, NY
101st Fighter-Interceptor Squadron, MA ANG, Otis AFB, MA
134th Defense Systems Evaluation Squadron, VT ANG, Burlington, VT
136th Fighter-Interceptor Squadron, NY ANG, Niagara Falls, NY

Radar Squadrons:

655th Radar Squadron (Inactivated 1979), Watertown AFS, NY
762d Radar Squadron (Inactivated 1984), North Truo AFS, MA
766th Radar Squadron (Inactivated 1980), Carswell AFS, ME
772d Radar Squadron (Inactivated 1984), Gibbsboro AFS, NJ
773d Radar Squadron (Inactivated 1981), Montauk AFS, NY

- 23d Air Division/NORAD Region

Duluth International Airport, Minnesota

Interceptor Squadrons:

87th Fighter-Interceptor Squadron (Inactivated 1985), K.I. Sawyer AFB, MI
171st Fighter-Interceptor Squadron, MI ANG, Selfridge AFB, MI

Radar Squadrons:

665th Radar Squadron (Inactivated 1988), Calumet AFS, MI
753d Radar Squadron (Inactivated 1979), Sault Sainte Marie AFS, MI
754th Radar Squadron (Inactivated 1988), Port Austin AFS, MI
756th Radar Squadron (Inactivated 1980), Finland AFS, MN

- 24th Air Division/NORAD Region

Malmstrom AFB, Montana

Interceptor Squadrons:

5th Fighter-Interceptor Squadron (Inactivated 1988), Minot AFB, ND
17th Defense Systems Evaluation Squadron (Inactivated 1979), Malmstrom AFB
178th Fighter-Interceptor Squadron, ND ANG, Fargo, ND
186th Fighter-Interceptor Squadron, MT ANG, Great Falls, MT

Radar Squadrons:

780th Air Defense Group (Inactivated 1984), Fortuna AFS, ND
785th Radar Squadron (Inactivated 1980), Finley AFS, ND

- 25th Air Division/NORAD Region

McChord AFB, Washington

Interceptor Squadrons:

318th Fighter Interceptor Squadron (Inactivated 1989), McChord AFB, WA
123d Fighter-Interceptor Squadron, OR ANG, Portland, OR

Radar Squadrons:

758th Radar Squadron (Inactivated 1988), Makah AFS, WA
761st Radar Squadron (Inactivated 1980), North Bend AFS, OR
777th Radar Squadron (Inactivated 1981), Klamath AFS, OR

- 26th Air Division/NORAD Region

Luke AFB, Arizona

Interceptor Squadrons:

84th Fighter-Interceptor Squadron (Inactivated 1981), Castle AFB, CA
111th Fighter-Interceptor Squadron, TX ANG, Ellington AFB, TX
194th Fighter-Interceptor Squadron, CA ANG, Fresno, CA

Radar Squadrons:

682d Radar Squadron (Inactivated 1980), Almaden AFS, CA
666th Radar Squadron (Inactivated 1980), Mill Valley AFS, CA
751st Radar Squadron (Inactivated 1981), Mount Laguna AFS, CA
775th Radar Squadron (Inactivated 1980), Cambria AFS, CA
776th Radar Squadron (Inactivated 1980), Port Arena AFS, CA

- Air Defense Weapons Center

USAF Interceptor Weapon School
Tyndall AFB, Florida

- Air Forces Iceland

NAS Keflavik, Iceland

57th Fighter-Interceptor Squadron
667th Aircraft Control and Warning Squadron (Inactivated 1988), Hofn AS
932d Air Control Squadron, Rockville AS
