= 73rd Air Division =

Inactive United States Air Force unit

73d Air Division
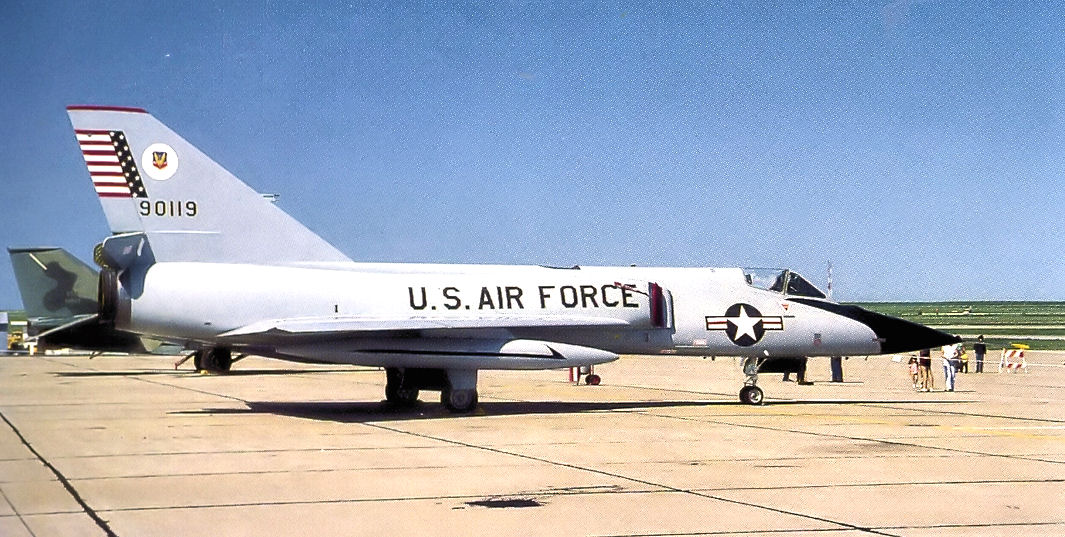
- 73d Air Division Convair F-106A Delta Dart
- Active: 1943–1943; 1943–1946; 1947–1949; 1957–1966
- Country: United States
- Branch: United States Air Force
- Role: Air Defense
- Equipment: see "Aerospace vehicles" section below
- Engagements: Asiatic-Pacific Campaign (1944–1945)

Insignia
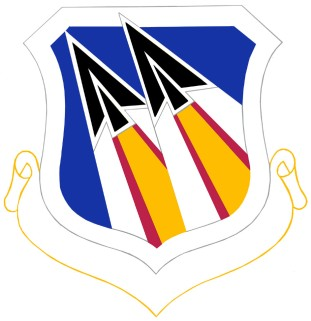
- 73d Air Division emblem (Note: Approved 9 April 1958.)

The 73d Air Division is an inactive United States Air Force unit. Its last assignment was with Air Defense Command at Tyndall Air Force Base, Florida, where it was inactivated on 1 April 1966.

== History ==
=== World War II ===
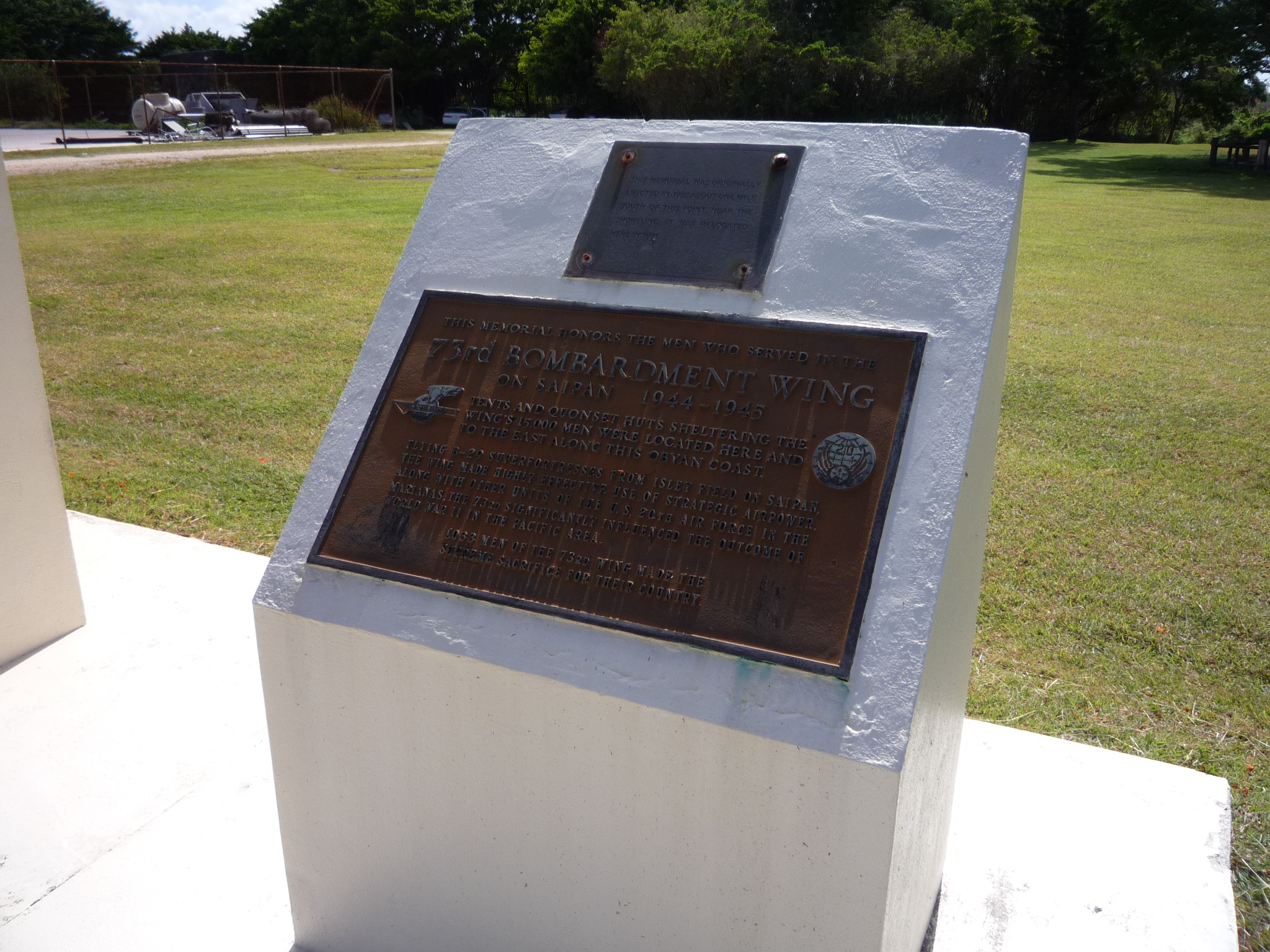
Memorial to the 73rd Bomb Wing near Saipan International Airport.

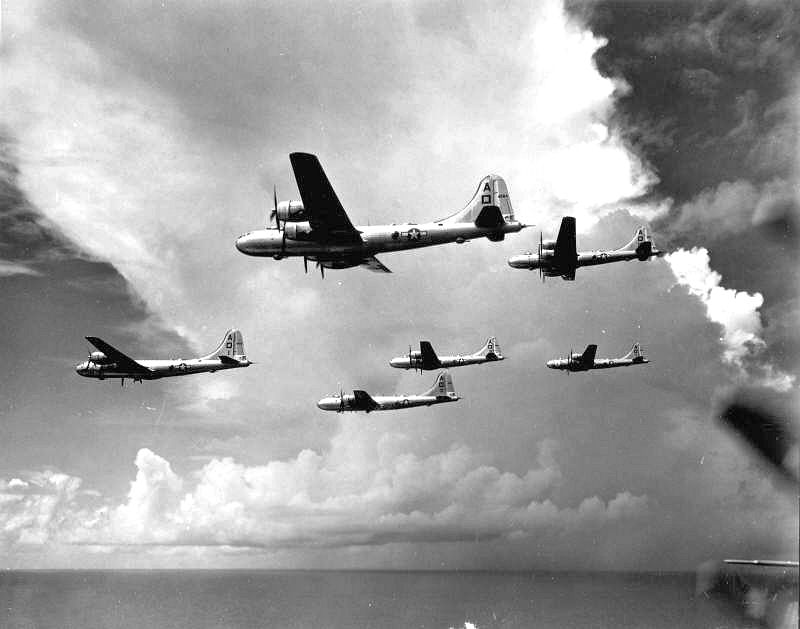
497th Bomb Group B-29 Formation

The 73d Bombardment Wing was activated as part of Second Air Force on 17 February 1943. Its original mission was to process personnel assigned to Boeing B-17 Flying Fortress and Consolidated B-24 Liberator Replacement Training Units (RTU) based in the midwest. It was inactivated on 15 October 1943 with the drawdown of heavy bomber training.

The wing was reactivated and redesignated as the 73d Bombardment Wing (Very Heavy) on 20 November 1943 at Smoky Hill Army Air Field, Kansas. The new Boeing B-29 Superfortress wing was assigned four newly organized groups (the 497th, 498th, 499th and 500th Bombardment Groups), which were training in New Mexico and Arizona with B-17s and B-24s, due to a lack of B-29 aircraft. In April 1944, the groups were brought to several airfields in Kansas (Great Bend Army Air Field, Smoky Hill Army Air Field and Walker Army Air Field) where they were equipped with new B-29s manufactured by Boeing at their Wichita, Kansas plant.

By August the wing's groups had completed their training and their aircraft were readied for deployment. Originally assigned to Twentieth Air Force's XX Bomber Command in India, the wing was instead assigned to the new XXI Bomber Command in the Pacific Theater. The 73d Wing deployed to newly constructed airfields on Saipan in the Northern Mariana Islands. The 73d Bomb Wing was the first B-29 wing to be assigned to the Marianas, and the first B-29 of the 497th Bomb Group arrived at Isely Field, Saipan on 12 October 1944. The 498th arrived shortly after, with the 499th and 500th Bomb Groups arriving in early November. By 22 November, over 100 B-29s were on Saipan. The XXI Bomber Command was assigned the task of destroying the aircraft industry of Japan in a series of high-altitude, daylight precision attacks

In late October and early November 1944, a series of tactical raids were carried out as training exercises for the crews. From Saipan, the groups of the 73d Bomb Wing flew several bombing missions against Truk to gain combat experience. Aware that there was now a new threat, Japanese aircraft based on Iwo Jima staged a low-level raid on Isely Field on 2 November, damaging several B-29s on the ground. Retaliatory strikes were ordered on Iwo Jima on 5 and 11 November.

In November 1944, the groups of the 73rd began bombing Japan, with only moderate success. Poor weather, the lack of precision radar bombing equipment, and tremendous winds encountered at high altitudes over Japan made accuracy difficult. The initial raids against Japan had taken place at high altitudes in order to stay above anti-aircraft fire and the effective altitude of defending fighters. Tactics were changed and high-altitude, daylight attacks be phased out and replaced by low-altitude, high-intensity incendiary raids at nighttime. The aircraft would attack individually, which meant that no assembly over the base at the start of the mission or along the way would be needed.

Consequently, it turned to devastating low altitude incendiary attacks. The Division continued attacking urban areas until the end of the war in August 1945, its subordinate units conducted raids against strategic objectives, bombing aircraft factories, chemical plants, oil refineries, and other targets in Japan. The wing flew its last combat missions on 14 August when hostilities ended. Afterwards, the wing's B 29s carried relief supplies to Allied prisoner of war camps in Japan and Manchuria.

The 73d and its subordinate units demobilized rapidly after V-J Day, and the wing's four bomb groups were all returned to the United States, with their B-29s either being flown to Clark Field for scrapping, or to storage facilities in Texas or Arizona. The 73d Bomb Wing was reassigned to the United States in December 1945, where it was assigned first to Continental Air Force's Fourth Air Force, then to Strategic Air Command (SAC) on 21 March 1946. However demobilization was in full swing and few SAC units were actually equipped and crewed. The 73d wing was inactivated on 31 March.

=== Air Force Reserve ===
In 1947, the 73d Bomb Wing was reactivated with the 338th and 351st Bombardment Groups being assigned to it, both reserve B-29 Superfortress organizations. A third group, the 381st Bombardment Group was added in 1948. However SAC was having enough difficulties keeping its front-line active duty B-29 bomb units in the air to maintain even minimal pilot proficiency in the late 1940s. The wing and its bomb groups were all inactivated in 1949.

=== Air Defense Command ===
The organization was reactivated as part of Air Defense Command (ADC) in 1957 as the 73d Air Division. As part of ADC, it evaluated, upgraded, and determined the proficiency of the Air Defense Command fighter-interceptor and missile squadrons, 1 July 1957 – 1 April 1966. The division developed and tested Air Defense Command tactics, equipment, aircraft, guided missiles, and related equipment and armaments. It also maintained active contact with Army, Navy, and other Air Force commands to assure coordinated military effort in the use of rocket and missile ranges, defense plans, air sea land rescue, and airspace and airways directly concerned with the operations of the Air Defense Command Weapons Center.

The 73d Air Division was inactivated on 1 April 1966.

== Lineage ==
- Constituted as the 5th Heavy Bombardment Processing Headquarters on 9 February 1943.

Activated on 17 February 1943
Redesignated 73d Bombardment Operational Training Wing (Heavy) on 12 August 1943.
Inactivated on 15 October 1943

- Redesignated 73d Bombardment Wing, Very Heavy on 19 November 1943

Activated on 20 November 1943
Redesignated 73d Bombardment Wing, Very Heavy, Special on 13 January 1944
Redesignated 73d Bombardment Wing, Very Heavy on 24 June 1944
Inactivated on 31 May 1946

- Activated in the reserve on 12 June 1947

Redesignated 73d Air Division, Bombardment on 16 April 1948
Inactivated on 27 June 1949

- Redesignated 73d Air Division (Weapons) on 1 April 1957

Activated on 1 July 1957
Redesignated 73d Air Division on 1 March 1963
Discontinued and inactivated on 1 April 1966

=== Assignments ===
- Second Air Force, 12 August 1945 – 15 October 1943
- XX Bomber Command, 20 November 1943
- Second Air Force, 2 June 1944 – 30 July 1944
- Twentieth Air Force, c. 6 August 1944
- XXI Bomber Command, 9 November 1944 – 16 July 1945
- Twentieth Air Force, 16 July 1945
- Fourth Air Force, 7 December 1945
- Third Air Force, 5 January 1946
- Strategic Air Command, 21 March 1946
- Fifteenth Air Force, 31 March 1946 – 31 May 1946
- Tenth Air Force, 1 July 1948 – 27 June 1949
- Air Defense Command, 1 July 1957 – 1 April 1966

=== Components ===
==== Sector ====
- Montgomery Air Defense Sector: 1 October 1964 – 1 April 1966

Gunter Air Force Base, Alabama

==== Wings ====
- 4750th Air Defense Wing: 1 July 1957 – 25 June 1960

Vincent Air Force Base, Arizona

- 4751st Air Defense Wing: 15 January 1958 – 1 October 1959

Eglin Auxiliary Field #9, Florida

- 4756th Air Defense Wing: 1 July 1957 – 1 July 1960
- 4756th Air Defense Wing: 1 September 1962 – 1 April 1966 (Note: Despite having the identical name, this wing was a different unit than the one listed first.)
- 4780th Air Defense Wing: 1 July 1962 – 1 April 1966

Perrin Air Force Base, Texas

==== Groups ====
Operational Groups

- 338th Bombardment Group: 17 October 1947 – 27 June 1949
- 351st Bombardment Group: 17 October 1947 – 4 June 1948

Scott Field (later Scott Air Force Base), Illinois

- 381st Bombardment Group: 4 June 1948 – 27 June 1949

Offutt Air Force Base, Nebraska

- 497th Bombardment Group: 20 November 1943 – 31 March 1946
- 498th Bombardment Group: 20 November 1943 – 31 May 1946
- 499th Bombardment Group: 20 November 1943 – 16 February 1946
- 500th Bombardment Group: 20 November 1943 – 17 January 1946
- 4756th Air Defense Group: 1 July 1960 – 1 September 1962

Support Groups

- 65th Air Service Group
- 91st Air Service Group
- 303d Air Service Group
- 330th Air Service Group
- 4756th Air Base Group: 1 July 1960 – 1 September 1962

=== Stations ===
- Walker Army Air Field, 17 February 1943
- Smoky Hill Army Airfield, Kansas, 30 June – 15 October 1943; 20 November 1943
- Colorado Springs, Colorado, 29 February – 17 July 1944
- Isely Field, Saipan, Mariana Islands, 24 August 1944 – 20 October 1945
- MacDill Field, Florida, 15 January – 31 May 1946.
- Orchard Place Airport, Illinois, 12 June 1947 – 29 June 1949.
- Tyndall Air Force Base, Florida, 1 July 1957 – 1 April 1966

=== Aircraft ===
- Boeing B-29 Superfortress, 1943–1946
- Martin B-57E Canberra, c. 1957 – c. 1960
- North American F-86D Sabre, c. 1955 – c. 1957
- Convair F-102 Delta Dagger, c. 1957 – c. 1966
- Lockheed F-104 Starfighter, c. 1957 – c. 1960
- Lockheed T-33 Shooting Star, c. 1957 – 1966
- McDonnell F-101 Voodoo, c. 1960 – c. 1966
- Convair F-106 Delta Dart, c. 1960 – c. 1966

== See also ==
- List of USAF Aerospace Defense Command General Surveillance Radar Stations
- Aerospace Defense Command Fighter Squadrons
- List of United States Air Force air divisions
