= 4756th Air Defense Group =

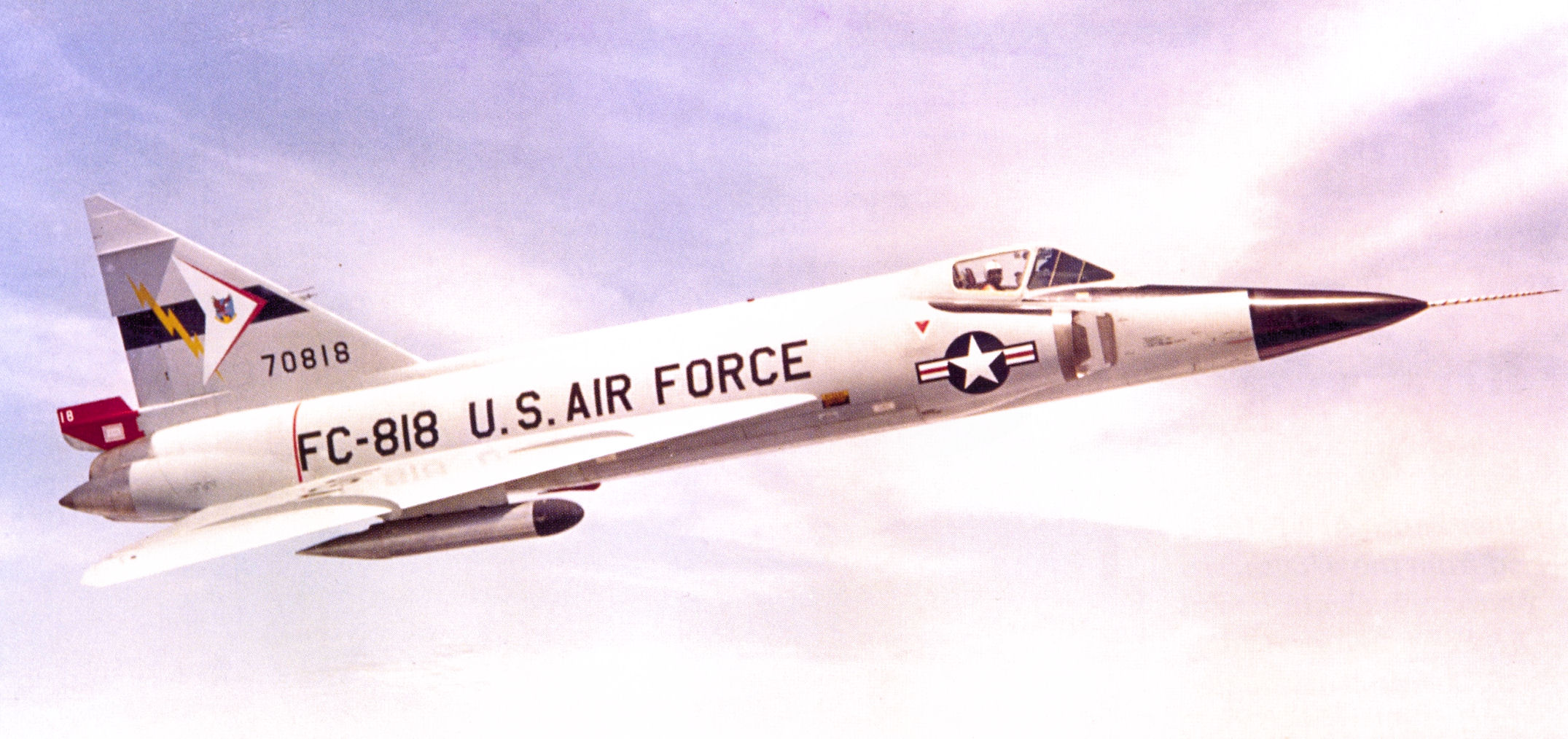
- F-102A of the group's 4756th Combat Crew Training Squadron at Tyndall AFB, Florida
- Active: 1955–1963
- Country: United States
- Branch: United States Air Force
- Type: Air defense
- Role: Interceptor training

Insignia
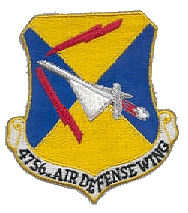
- Patch with 4756th Air Defense Wing emblem

The 4756th Air Defense Group (Weapons) is a discontinued United States Air Force organization. Its last assignment was with the 4756th Air Defense Wing of Air Defense Command (ADC) at Tyndall Air Force Base, Florida, where it was discontinued in 1963.

The group was first activated at Moody Air Force Base, Georgia, but moved to Tyndall when ADC assumed the interceptor aircraft crew training mission from Air Training Command. In 1963, its mission was absorbed directly to its parent wing, which was also located at Tyndall.

== History ==
The 4756th Air Defense Group was organized at Moody Air Force Base, Georgia in February 1955 as a tenant of Air Training Command's 3550th Air Base Group, an element of the 3550th Combat Crew Training Wing, which trained interceptor pilots, in order to improve Air Defense Command's (ADC) rocketry proficiency program. The group was assigned two squadrons, the 4756th Air Defense Squadron (Weapons), which was already stationed at Moody and assigned directly to the 4750th Air Defense Wing, and the 4757th Air Defense Squadron (Interceptor Weapons School), which was organized at Tyndall Air Force Base in 1957.

At Moody, the group trained aircrew and aircraft controllers and evaluated ADC tactical units. The group and the 4756th squadron moved to Tyndall when ADC assumed the crew training mission for ADC's interceptor crews from Air Training Command and Moody became a pilot training base.

In April 1961, the group participated in Operation Southern Tip, deploying six Convair F-102 Delta Dagger aircraft to Homestead Air Force Base, Florida in a two-week test of a contingency plan to augment air defense forces in Southern Florida in face of the potential threat from an unfriendly Cuba. Two of the F-102s were maintained on armed five-minute alert status. However, on 17 April the Bay of Pigs Invasion occurred, and the Joint Chiefs of Staff directed that Southern Tip continue indefinitely. However, the group's contribution to this mission was reduced to three aircraft in mid May because of the impact of the extended deployment on its training and testing mission. The 482d Fighter-Interceptor Squadron then assumed the mission from the group.

On 15 November 1962, the 4756th Air Defense Squadron was redesignated the 4756th Combat Crew Training Squadron. The group was discontinued in 1963 and its personnel, equipment, functions, and subordinate squadrons transferred to 4756th Air Defense Wing.

== Lineage ==
- Designated as: 4756th Air Defense Group (Weapons) and organized on 18 February 1955

Discontinued on 1 January 1963

=== Assignments ===
- 4750th Air Defense Wing, 18 February 1955 – 1 July 1957
- 4756th Air Defense Wing, 1 July 1957 – 1 July 1960
- 73d Air Division, 1 July 1960 – 1 September 1962
- 4756th Air Defense Wing, 1 September 1962 – 1 January 1963

=== Stations ===
- Moody Air Force Base, Georgia, 18 February 1955
- Tyndall Air Force Base, Florida, 1 July 1960 – 1 January 1963

=== Components ===
- 4756th Air Defense Squadron (Weapons) (later 4756th Combat Crew Training Squadron), 18 February 1955 – 1 January 1963
- 4757th Air Defense Squadron (Interceptor Weapons School), 1 July 1957 – 1 January 1963

=== Commanders ===
- Col. Herschel H. Green, July 1956 – April 1957
- Col. K. L. Berry, Jr., 1958–ca. 30 June 1958
- Lt Col. Carl W. Stewart, ca. 1 July 1958 – 1958
- Lt Col. James E. Anderson, 1959
- Col. James H. Hancock, 1960
- Col. R. W. Holmes, 3 August 1962 – unknown
