= 319th Expeditionary Reconnaissance Squadron =

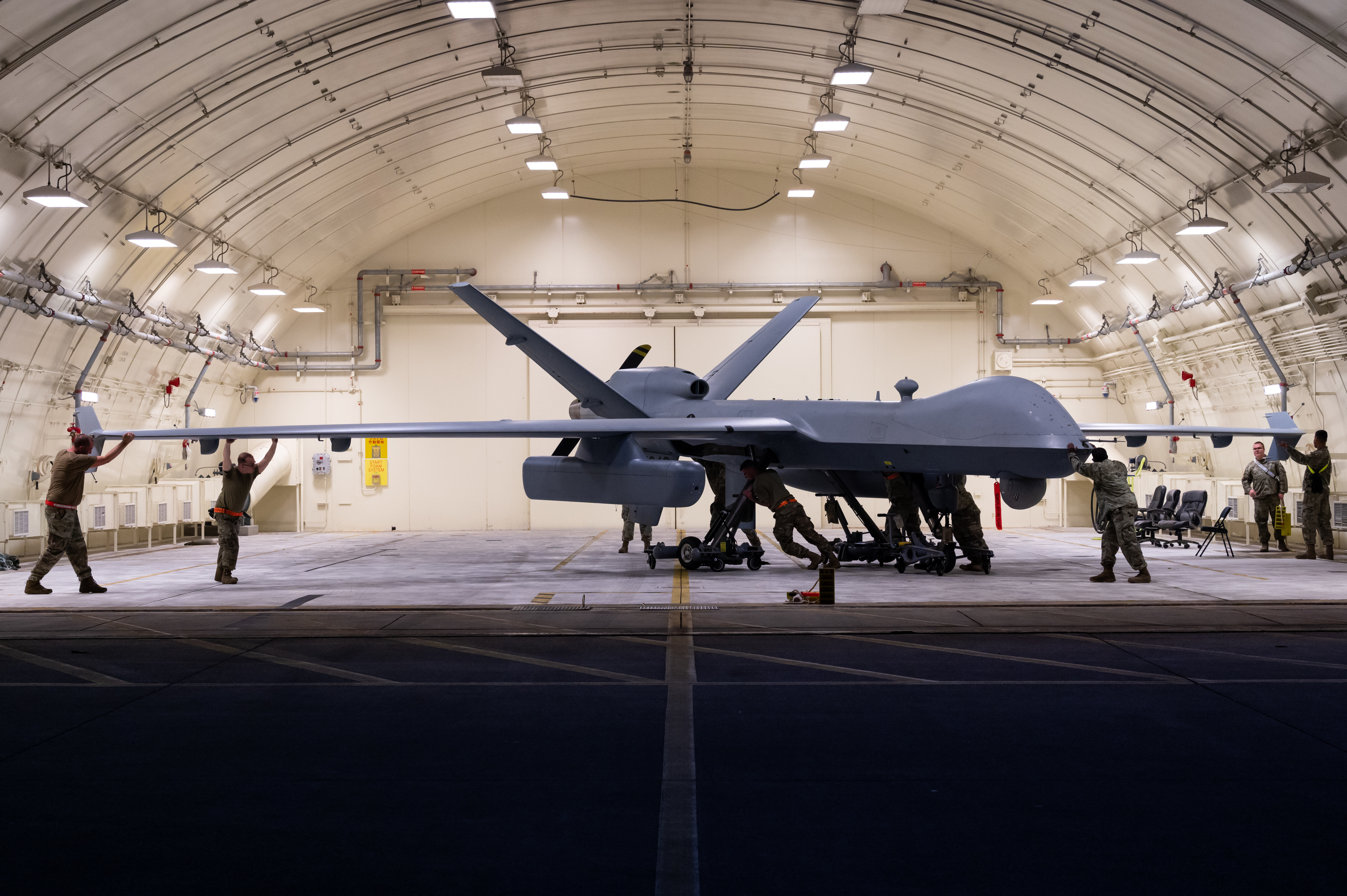
- MQ-9 Reaper of the 319th ERS being pushed into a hardened aircraft shelter at Kadena Air Base
- Active: 1942–1945; 1947–1969; 1971–1972; 1975–1977; 2022–present
- Country: United States
- Branch: United States Air Force
- Role: aerial reconnaissance
- Part of: Pacific Air Forces
- Garrison/HQ: Kadena Air Base
- Motto: We Get Ours at Night
- Engagements: Mediterranean Theater of Operations; Korean War
- Decorations: Distinguished Unit Citation; Republic of Korea Presidential Unit Citation

Commanders
- Current commander: Lt. Col. Alexander Kelly

Insignia
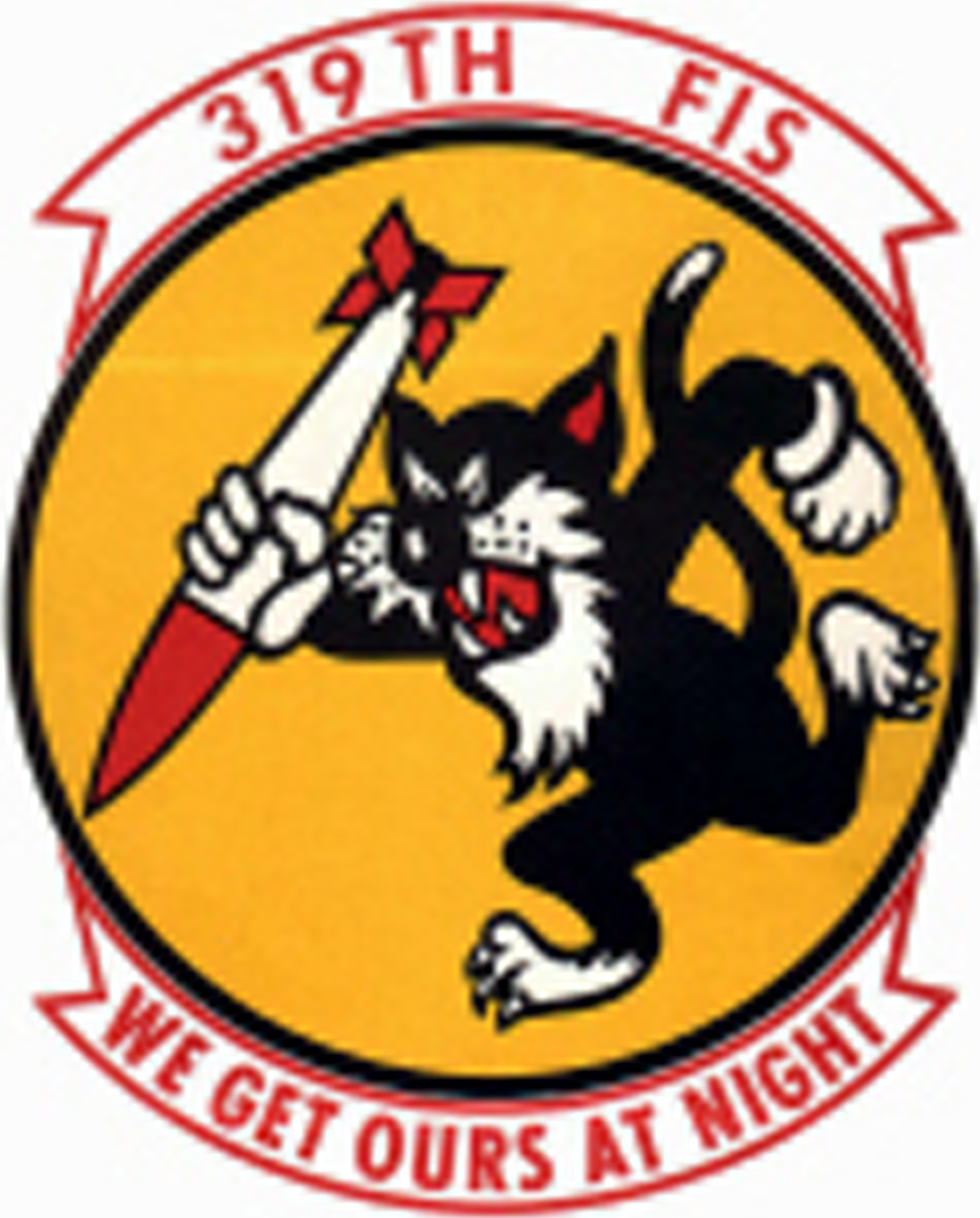
- 319th Fighter-Interceptor Squadron emblem (Note: Approved 28 May 1957.)

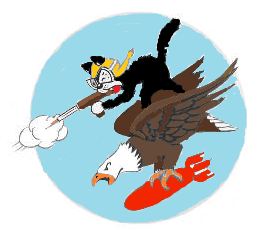
- 319th Fighter Squadron emblem (Note: Approved 5 February 1943.)

Aircraft flown
- Reconnaissance: MQ-9A Reaper

The 319th Expeditionary Reconnaissance Squadron is a provisional United States Air Force unit stationed at Kadena Air Base, Japan, operating General Atomics MQ-9 Reaper unmanned reconnaissance vehicles.

The squadron was first activated as the 319th Fighter Squadron during World War II. After training in the United States, it deployed to North Africa. In combat operations in the Mediterranean Theater of Operations. It was withdrawn from combat from September to December 1943 while it equipped with different aircraft and moved from Africa to Italy. It earned two Distinguished Unit Citations before returning to the United States for inactivation.

The squadron was reactivated in 1947, serving in the air defense role in Panama and the Northwestern United States until the spring of 1952, when it deployed to Korea. In combat operations through 1953, it earned another Distinguished Unit Citation and a Republic of Korea Presidential Unit Citation. It was inactivated in Japan in 1955. It resumed its air defense role later that year, serving as the 319th Fighter-Interceptor Squadron under Air Defense Command until 1969, and briefly from 1971 to 1972. It served as a training unit, the 319th Fighter Interceptor Training Squadron, with the Interceptor Weapons School from 1975 to 1977.

The squadron was converted to provisional status as the 319th Expeditionary Reconnaissance Squadron to provide unmanned reconnaissance in the North Pacific in 2022.

== History ==
=== World War II ===
==== Organization and training ====
The squadron was first organized at Mitchel Field, New York on 3 August 1942 as one of the three original squadrons of the 325th Fighter Group, but moved the same day to Brainard Field, Connecticut. The squadron drew its initial cadre from the 87th Fighter Squadron. It equipped with Curtiss P-40 Warhawks and trained for combat at Brainard Field and Hillsgrove Army Air Field, Rhode Island until late January 1943, when it began to deploy overseas. In addition to training, the squadron flew regular patrols off the New England coast under the control of the Boston Fighter Wing.

On 2 January, the air echelon flew their Warhawks to Norfolk, Virginia, where they were loaded aboard the USS Ranger, a United States Navy aircraft carrier. When the Ranger approached the coast of Africa, their pilots flew their planes to the mainland. The remainder of the air echelon was transported across the Atlantic via the South Atlantic Ferry Route. On 22 January 1943, the ground echelon moved to Camp Kilmer, New Jersey, On 7 February, they boarded the USS Lyon. They arrived at Oran, Algeria two weeks later. On 1 March, the ground and air echelons of the squadron were united.

==== Combat operations ====
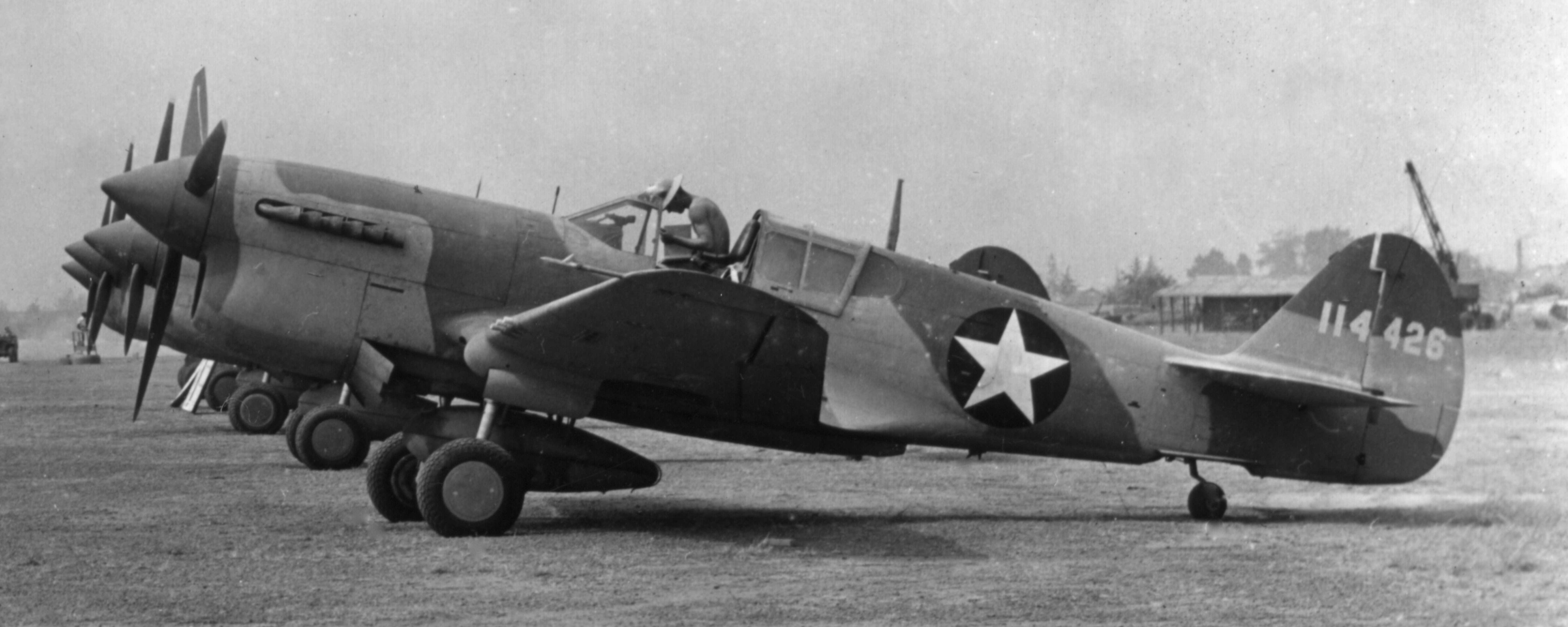
P-40s at Tafaraoui Airfield

The squadron arrived in the Mediterranean Theater of Operations in February and was established at its first combat station, Tafaraoui Airfield, Algeria by 1 March 1943. It flew its first combat mission on 17 April, a strike against Mateur Airfield. It escorted medium bombers and flew strafing missions and flew sweeps over the Mediterranean Sea from bases in Algeria and Tunisia. The squadron participated in the defeat of Axis forces in Tunisia. It participated in the reduction of Pantelleria and in Operation Husky, the invasion and conquest of Sicily. On 22 July, near Cagliari, the squadron destroyed 12 enemy aircraft without any loss. On 30 July, the 325th Group used diversionary tactics to lure a superior number of enemy planes into the air over Sardinia, destroying more than half of them. The squadron was awarded its first Distinguished Unit Citation for this action. On 28 August, Lt Collins became the squadron's first ace. In late September 1943, the squadron was withdrawn from combat to convert to Republic P-47 Thunderbolts and prepare to move to the Italian peninsula. Training on the new aircraft was delayed by heavy intermittent rain at its North African base.

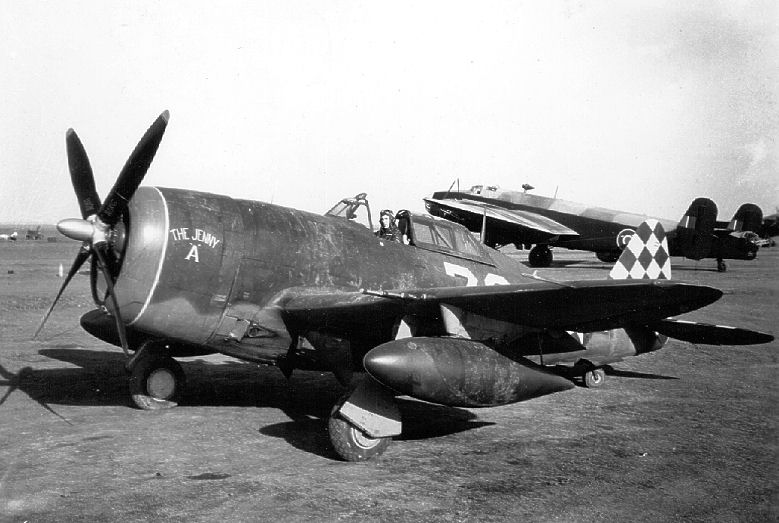
325th Fighter Group P-47

By early December 1943, the squadron began to operate its Thunderbolts from Foggia Airfield, Italy, flying its first mission with the new plane on 14 December, escorting Boeing B-17 Flying Fortresses on attack on Corfu. However, it only operated the P-47 for a short period, converting to North American P-51 Mustangs in March 1944, and moving to Lesina Airfield, Italy on the 29th of the month. However, on 30 January it flew its "T-Bolts" more than 300 miles at very low altitude to make a surprise attack on German interceptors defending airdromes near Villorba. The severe losses it inflicted on the defending forces enabled heavy bombers to attack vital targets in the area without encountering serious opposition. This action resulted in the second award of the Distinguished Unit Citation to the squadron.

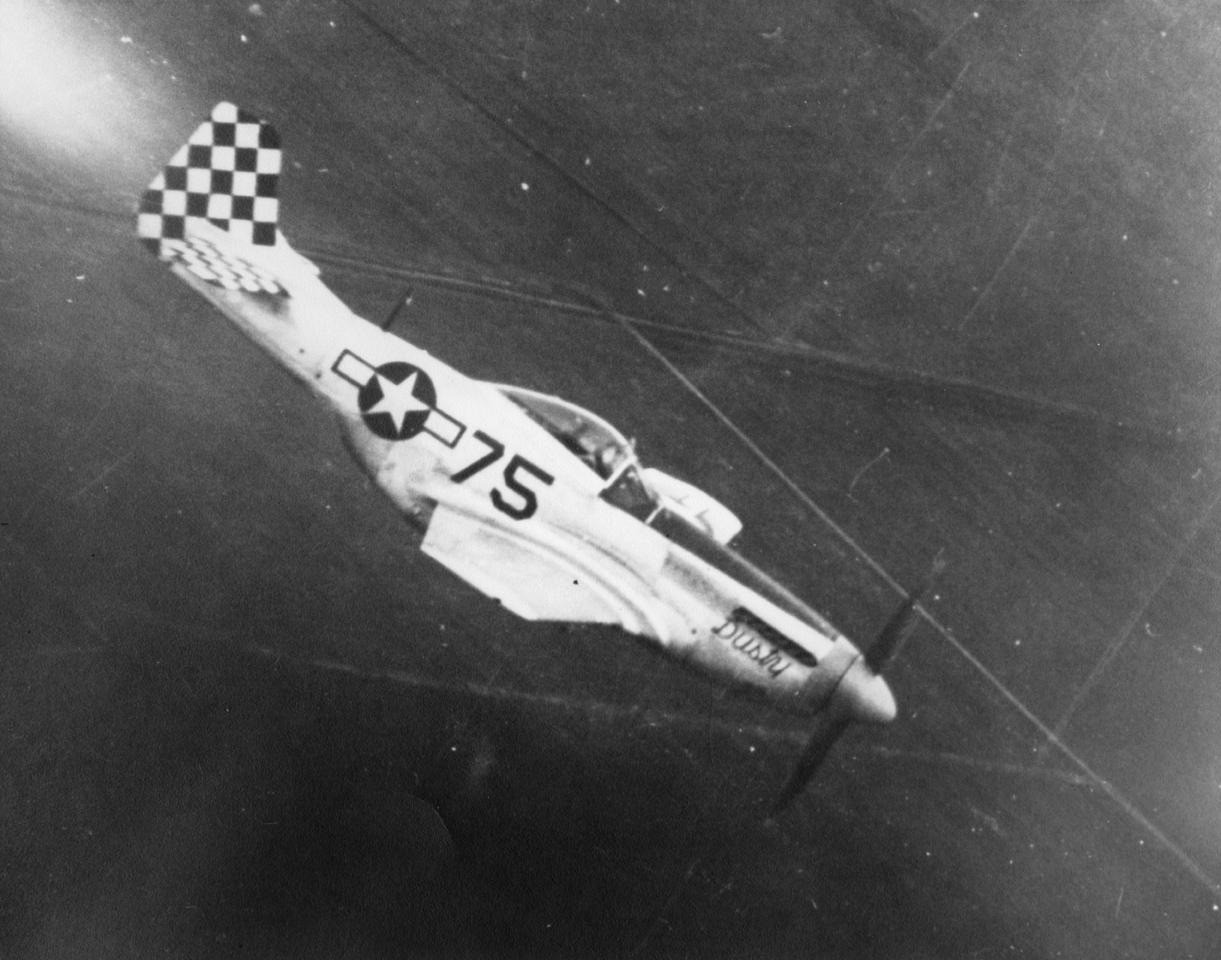
Squadron P-51D Mustang "Dusty"

It escorted the heavy bombers of Fifteenth Air Force on long range missions against the Daimler Benz factory in Berlin, the Messerschmitt factory in Regensburg and oil refineries near Vienna. It also flew escort for attacks on other targets, such as airfields and marshalling yards and lines of communication in Italy, France, Germany, Czechoslovakia, Austria, Hungary, Yugoslavia and Romania. It also strafed trains, vehicles and airfields. On 2 June, the squadron escorted B-17s that bombed a marshalling yard at Debrecen, Hungary, landing at bases in the Soviet Union. Four days later it escorted the bombers on their return flight, attacking the airfield at Galați, Romania. This was the first mission of Operation Frantic, shuttle missions using Soviet bases.

In August 1944, the squadron temporarily deployed to Tarquinia Airfield, from which they provided cover for Douglas C-47 Skytrains carrying paratroopers in Operation Dragoon, the invasion of southern France. The squadron also attacked coastal defenses in preparation for the invasion. Later that year, he increased threat from Messerschmitt Me 262 jet fighters created a requirement to escort reconnaissance aircraft operating over enemy territory. The squadron continued operations until May 1945. The 319th was credited with the destruction of 119 enemy aircraft in air to air combat. After V-E Day, it moved to Vincenzo Airfield, Italy, remaining there until October, when it returned to the United States and was inactivated at Camp Kilmer, New Jersey on 28 October.

=== Air defense operations ===
==== Panama and West Coast operations ====
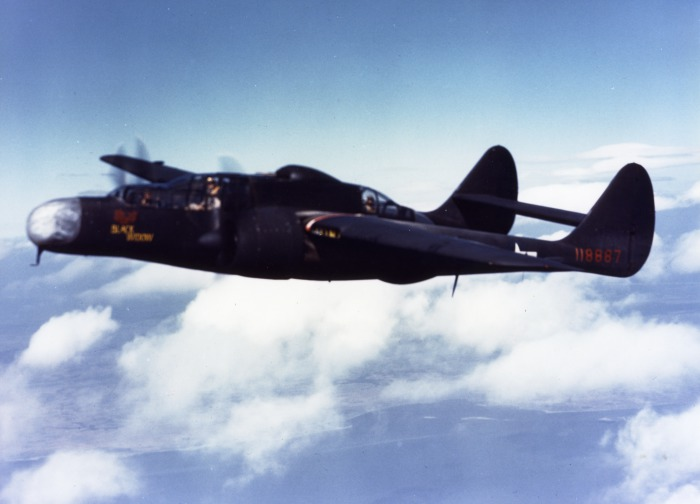
P-61 Black Widow

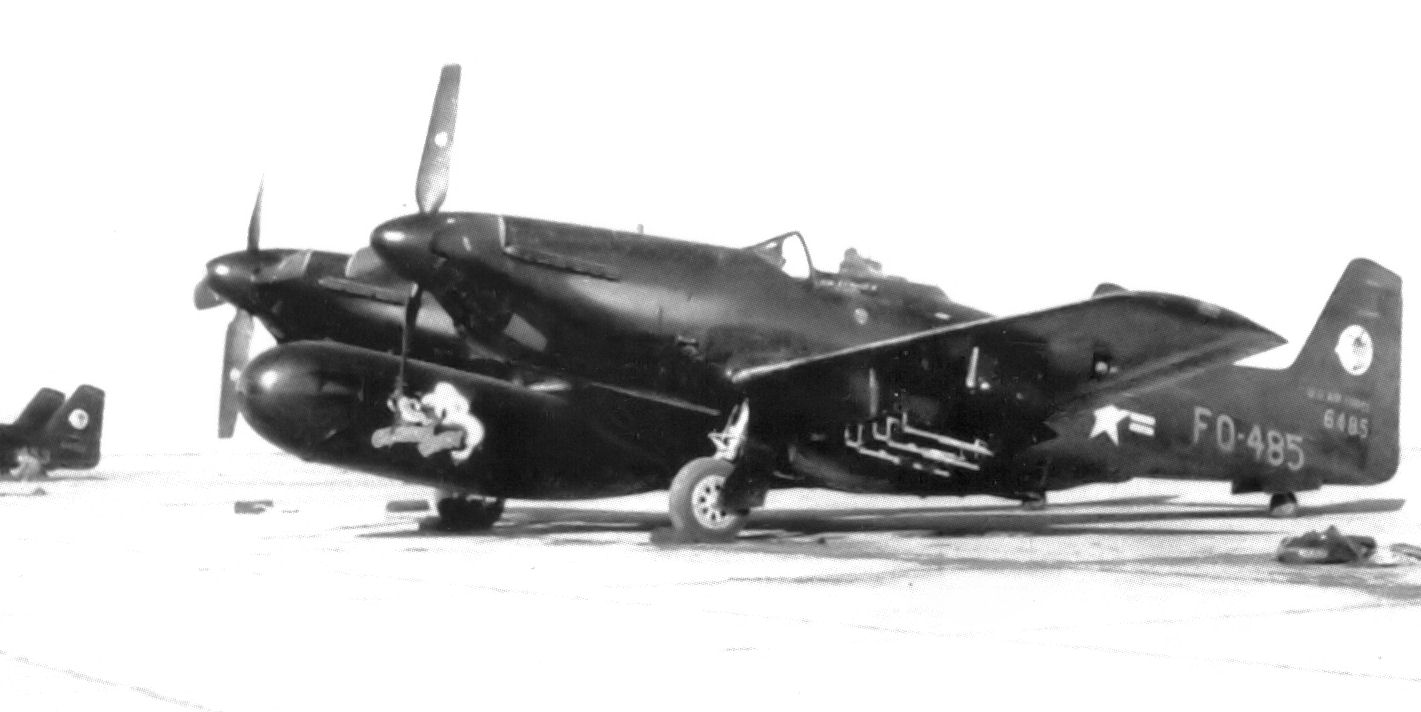
319th Fighter All Weather Squadron F-82F Twin Mustang at Moses Lake AFB (Note: Aircraft is North American F-82F Twin Mustang serial 46-485, taken in October 1949.)

The squadron was reactivated in September 1947 at Rio Hato Air Base, Panama, when it took over the mission of providing air defense for the Panama Canal, along with the personnel, and Northrop P-61 Black Widows of the 414th Night Fighter Squadron, which was inactivated. In December 1947 the Treaty between the United States and Panama permitting American military units to be stationed in the Republic of Panama, was unanimously rejected by the National Assembly of Panama. This required the unit to move to France Field in the Panama Canal Zone. In 1948, the squadron replaced its Black Widows with North American F-82F Twin Mustangs. However, France Air Force Base was scheduled to close in August 1949, and on 29 April 1949, the squadron departed the Canal Zone for the United States.

The squadron arrived at McChord Air Force Base, Washington on 12 May 1949. It was once again assigned to the 325th Group in July, and moved to Moses Lake Air Force Base in September, to provide air defense for the Pacific Northwest, especially the Hanford Nuclear Reservation in Eastern Washington. By June 1951 it had completed equipping with the new Lockheed F-94A Starfire, armed with 20 millimeter cannon. The 325th Group was the first unit in the Air Force to fly the F-94 By December, it was replacing these with F-94Bs, which later also added FFAR rocket pods on the wingtips.

In a major reorganization of Air Defense Command (ADC) (Note: Air Defense Command had been reactivated on 1 December 1950 and assumed Continental Air Command's air defense mission.) responding to ADC's difficulty under the existing wing base organizational structure in deploying fighter squadrons to best advantage. the 325th was inactivated on 6 February 1952 and the 319th was transferred to the recently activated 4703rd Defense Wing.

==== Korean War ====
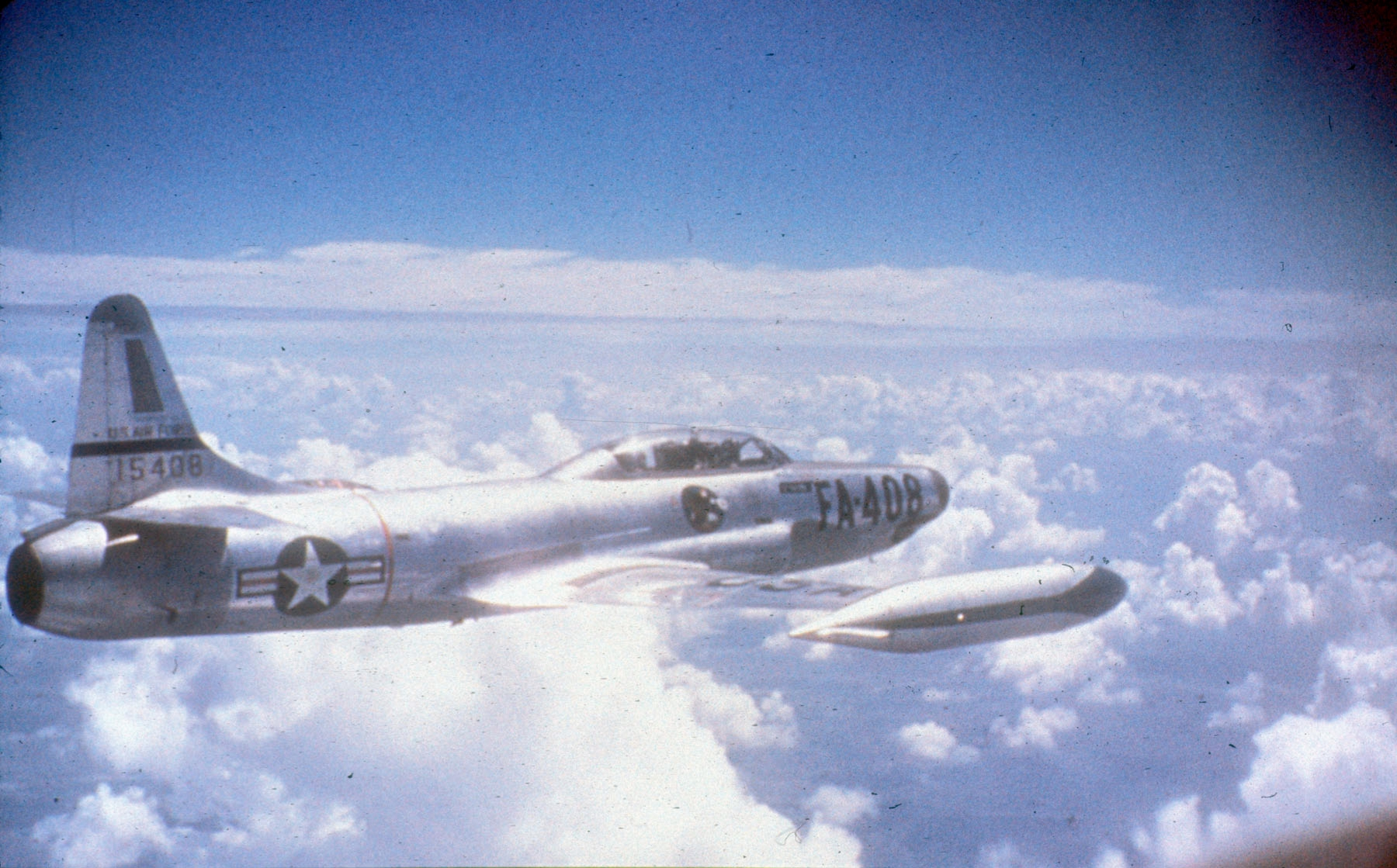
A 319th FIS F-94B over Korea, 1952

As long as nothing more than North Korean hecklers, called "Bedcheck Charlies", tested United Nations air defenses in the Korean War, they seemed adequate. However, in December 1951, Mikoyan-Gurevich MiG-15 jet fighters appeared over Seoul. Fifth Air Force determined a need for additional nighttime all-weather air interceptors in the Seoul area. In response the United States Air Force accelerated the conversion of the 68th Fighter-Interceptor Squadron from F-82s to F-94s and directed ADC to augment Korean Air defenses with the 319th, which left Moses Lake in February and was established at Suwon Air Base, South Korea in March 1952. flying its first combat mission on 22 March. Although the squadron remained assigned to ADC, it was attached to Fifth Air Force or subordinate units for operational control while stationed in the Far East. Squadron strength in Korea remained below authorization, due to shortages in F-94s throughout the Air Force. It only reached full strength in Korea after the end of hostilities.

Until November 1952, Fifth Air Force restricted the use of the Starfires to local air defense under positive control of ground-controlled interception stations in order to prevent the possible compromise of its airborne intercept radar equipment if one of the aircraft were lost over enemy-held territory. During a visit to Korea, Air Force Chief of Staff, General Hoyt Vandenberg was advised of this situation, and personally authorized the 319th's F-94s to fly over North Korea. From November until the Korean Armistice Agreement of 1953, 319th F-94s maintained fighter screens between the Yalu and Chongchon Rivers in North Korea, helping to protect Boeing B-29 Superfortress bombers from enemy interceptors. They also began to fly four to six aircraft about 30 miles in advance of the bombers. On the night of 30 January 1953, the 319th scored its first victory in Korea, an Lavochkin La-9. Victories over enemy jet fighters followed in May and June. In addition, numerous enemy fighters were turned back from the bomber stream by the squadron. The squadron was less effective against "Bedcheck Charlies" whose radar return was lost in ground clutter at low altitudes and operated below the stall speed of the F-94s. On 12 June, the squadron commander, while attempting to intercept a low and slow flying enemy Polikarpov Po-2 aircraft was lost when he apparently collided with his target.

The squadron flew its last Korean missions the night the armistice went into effect, counter air patrols. In August 1954, the squadron was withdrawn to Johnson Air Base, remaining there until leaving for the United States on 18 August 1955.

==== Air defense of the Midwest ====
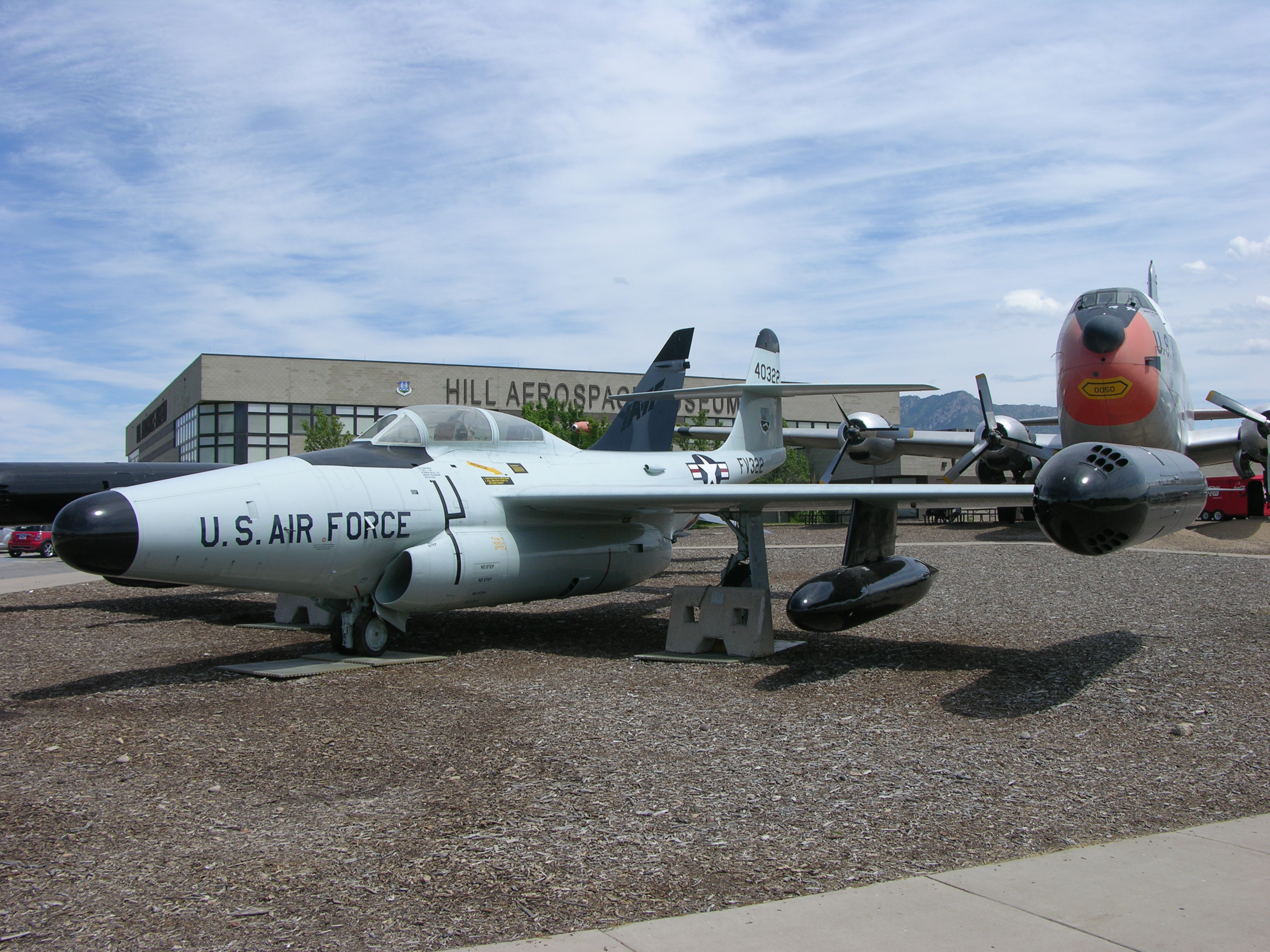
F-89J Scorpion at the Hill AFB Museum

In 1954, the United States Navy transferred Bunker Hill Air Force Base, Indiana to the Air Force. The squadron was established there on 1 November 1955 and equipped with F-94C interceptors. The F-94C was a much improved model of the F-94, (Note: It had originally been considered different enough to be designated the F-97. Knaack, p. 106.) incorporating a more powerful J48 engine, all-rocket armament, aerodynamic modifications and a vastly improved fire control system. In the fall of 1957, the squadron converted to Northrop F-89J Scorpions. The F-89J was a modified F-89D, equipped as the Air Force's first nuclear armed interceptot with two MB-1 Genie rockets and an upgraded fire control system. In February 1960 the 319th converted to supersonic Convair F-106 Delta Darts. On 22 October 1962, before President John F. Kennedy told Americans that missiles were in place in Cuba, the squadron dispersed one third of its force, equipped with nuclear tipped missiles to Hulman Field at the start of the Cuban Missile Crisis.

==== Air defense of Florida ====
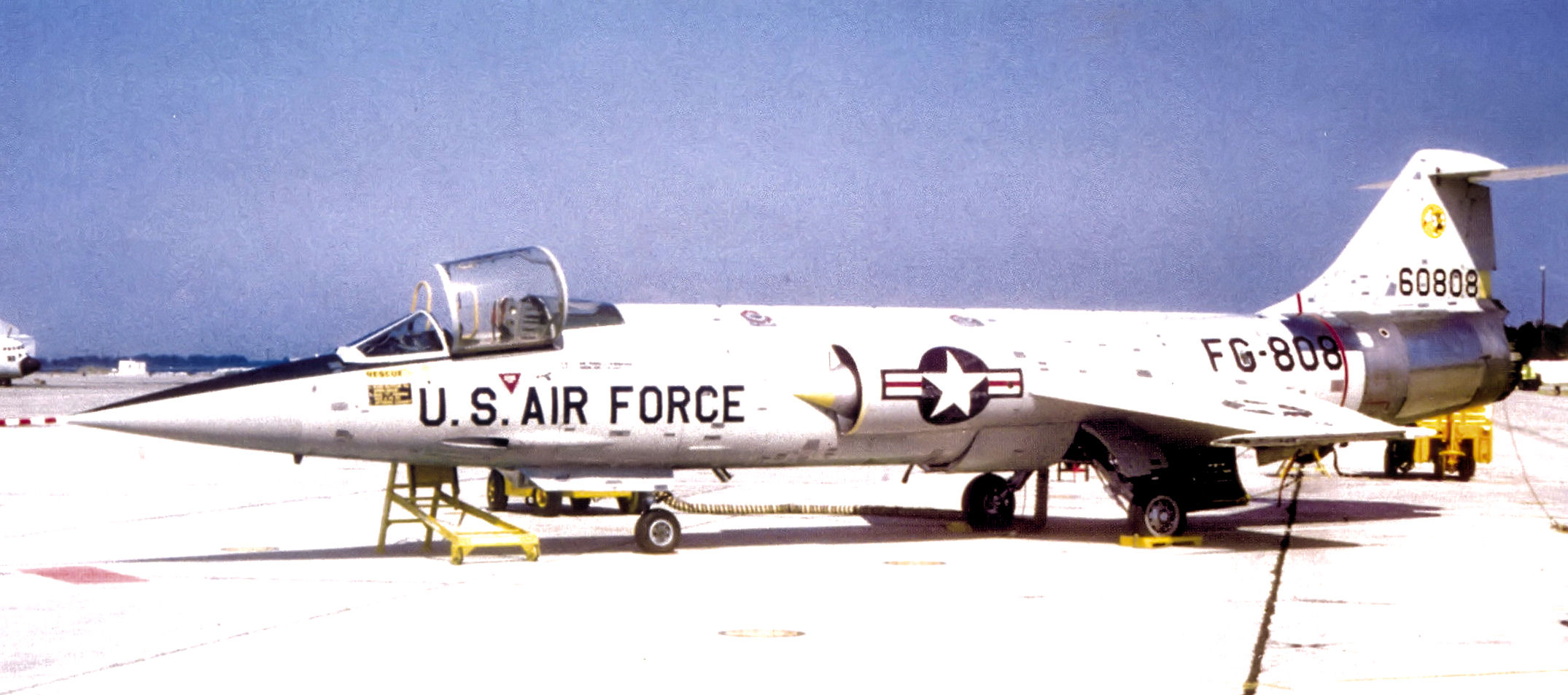
319th F-104A at Patrick AFB (Note: Aircraft is Lockheed F-104A-20-LO Starfighter serial 56-808, taken 15 May 1965.)

ADC decided to make its deployed fighter unit at Homestead Air Force Base permanent and equip it with Lockheed F-104A Starfighters because of the F-104's superior fighter on fighter performance. ADC had released all its F-104s to the Air National Guard in 1960 because its fire control system was not sophisticated enough to make it an all weather interceptor and it was to small have data link installed to operate with the SAGE system. However, the lack of all weather capability was not a factor in south Florida because Cuba lacked a bomber force. The Air Force withdrew the F-104s from the 157th Fighter-Interceptor Squadron, which had been federalized in 1962 for the Berlin Crisis when it was released from active duty and returned to McEntire Air National Guard Base to equip the Homestead squadron.

In March 1963 the 319th moved on paper to Homestead, and on 15 April, it assumed an alert posture with F-104As. These planes replaced a detachment of F-102s from the 325th Fighter-Interceptor Squadron that had been at Homestead since the Cuban missile crisis. In addition, the squadron received the two-seat, dual-control, combat trainer F-104B. The performance of the F-104B was almost identical to that of the F-104A, but the lower internal fuel capacity reduced its effective range considerably. The F-104A was armed with AIM-9 Sidewinder missiles only. In 1964, to improve its capability against the expected threat, the 319th's F-104s began to be equipped with M-61 Vulcan cannons. During the period when the squadron's planes were being modified, the 479th Tactical Fighter Wing deployed F-104Cs, which were already armed with the M-61, to augment the alert force at Homestead.

These ADC F-104As remained in service for several years. From late 1967, 26 aircraft of the 319th were retrofitted with the more powerful J79-GE-19 engine, rated at 17,900 lb. static thrust with afterburner, which was the same type of engine fitted to the F-104S version developed for Italy. The last active duty USAF squadron to operate the F-104, the 319th was inactivated in December 1969.

==== Air defense of the Northwest ====
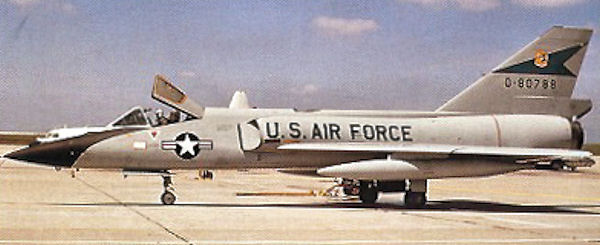
319th Fighter-Interceptor Squadron F-106 Delta Dart at Malmstrom AFB (Note: Aircraft is Convair F-106A Delta Dart serial 58-788, taken in 1971. The plane carries the tail markings of the 71st Fighter-Interceptor Squadron, from which it was transferred in July 1971 with the 319th emblem overlaid on top,)

On 1 July 1971 the 71st Fighter-Interceptor Squadron moved from Malmstrom Air Force Base, Montana to MacDill Air Force Base, where it joined its traditional headquarters as the 71st Tactical Fighter Squadron Squadron. The 319th was reactivated at Malmstrom, taking over the personnel, mission, and aircraft of the 71st. Once again, the squadron flew F-106s. However, this activation was short-lived as on 30 April 1972, the squadron was inactivated as ADC ended its interceptor operations at Malmstrom.

=== Interceptor training ===
The unit was activated again as the 319th Fighter Interceptor Training Squadron at Tyndall Air Force Base, Florida in June 1975. It was part of the Air Defense Weapons Center, training interceptor pilots. A little over two years later the unit was inactivated on 1 November 1977.

=== Aerial reconnaissance ===
The unit was reactivated at the Japan Maritime Self-Defense Force's Kanoya Air Field as the 319th Expeditionary Reconnaissance Squadron in October 2022. Pacific Air Forces is setting up the squadron to fly General Atomics MQ-9 Reaper reconnaissance operations in coordination with the Japanese Ministry of Defense in the Indo-Pacific. The MQ-9s will carry out U.S. surveillance and reconnaissance missions with coordination with the Japanese. On 13 October 2023, the 319th ERS began relocating to Kadena Air Base after the agreement with the Government of Japan to house the squadron at Kanoya for one year expired.

== Lineage ==
- Constituted as the 319th Fighter Squadron on 24 June 1942
- Activated on 3 August 1942

Inactivated on 28 October 1945

- Activated on 1 September 1947

Redesignated 319th Fighter Squadron (All Weather) on 17 June 1948
Redesignated 319th Fighter-All Weather Squadron on 20 January 1950
Redesignated 319th Fighter-Interceptor Squadron on 1 May 1951
Inactivated on 1 December 1969

- Activated on 1 July 1971

Inactivated on 30 April 1972
Redesignated 319th Fighter Interceptor Training Squadron on 6 June 1975

- Activated on 30 June 1975

Inactivated on 30 November 1977
Converted to provisional status and redesignated 319th Expeditionary Reconnaissance Squadron

- Activated on 23 October 2022

=== Assignments ===
- 325th Fighter Group, 3 August 1942 – 28 October 1945
- 6th Fighter Wing, 1 September 1947
- Sixth Air Force (attached to Provisional Composite Group), 1 February 1948
- 6th Fighter Wing, 1 June 1948
- 5620th Group, 26 July 1948
- 5620th Composite Wing, 12 October 1948
- Fourth Air Force, 12 May 1949
- 325th Fighter Group (later 325th Fighter-All Weather Group, 325th Fighter-Interceptor Group), 1 July 1949)
- 4703d Defense Wing, 6 February 1952 (attached to Fifth Air Force after 1 March 1952)
- Western Air Defense Force, 7 April 1952 (attached to Fifth Air Force until 20 February 1954, 8th Fighter-Bomber Wing, until 17 August 1954, 35th Fighter-Interceptor Wing until 1 September 1954, then to Fifth Air Force)
- 4706th Air Defense Wing, 1 October 1955 (attached to Fifth Air Force until c. 18 October 1955)
- 58th Air Division, 1 March 1956
- 30th Air Division, 1 September 1958
- Detroit Air Defense Sector, 1 April 1959
- Chicago Air Defense Sector, 1 July 1960
- Montgomery Air Defense Sector, 1 March 1963 – 1 December 1969
- 24th Air Division, 1 July 1971 – 30 April 1972
- Air Defense Weapons Center, 1 June 1975 – 30 November 1977
- Pacific Air Forces (attached to 374th Airlift Wing), 23 October 22 – present

=== Stations ===
- Mitchel Field, New York, 3 August 1942
- Brainard Field, Connecticut, 3 August 1942
- Hillsgrove Army Air Field, Rhode Island, 6 October 1942 – 23 January 1943
- Tafaraoui Airfield, Algeria, 1 March 1943
- Montesquieu Airfield, Algeria, 9 April 1943
- Souk-el-Khemis Airfield, Tunisia, 4 June 1943
- Mateur Airfield, Tunisia, 19 June 1943
- Soliman Airfield, Tunisia, 4 November 1943
- Foggia Airfield Complex, Italy, c. 9 December 1943
- Celone Airfield (Foggia Airfield #1) 30 December 1943
- Lesina Airfield, Italy, 29 March 1944
- Rimini Airfield, Italy, c. 5 March 1945
- Mondolfo Airfield, Italy, c. 3 April 1945
- Vincenzo Airfield, Italy, July – 9 October 1945
- Camp Kilmer, New Jersey, 26–28 October 1945
- Rio Hato Air Base, Panama, 1 September 1947
- France Field (later France Air Force Base), Panama Canal Zone, 14 January 1948 – 29 April 1949
- McChord Air Force Base, Washington, 12 May 1949
- Moses Lake Air Force Base, Washington, 2 September 1949 – 2 February 1952
- Suwon Air Base (K-13), South Korea, 10 March 1952
- Johnson Air Base, Japan, 17 August 1954 – 18 October 1955
- Bunker Hill Air Force Base, Indiana, 1 November 1955
- Homestead Air Force Base, Florida, 1 March 1963 – 1 December 1969
- Malmstrom Air Force Base, Montana, 1 July 1971 – 30 April 1972
- Tyndall Air Force Base, Florida, 1 June 1975 – 30 November 1977
- Kanoya Air Field, Japan, 23 October 2022 – 13 October 2023
- Kadena Air Base, Japan, 13 October 2023 – present

=== Aircraft ===
- Curtiss P-40 Warhawk, 1942–1943
- Republic P-47 Thunderbolt, 1943–1944
- North American P-51 Mustang, 1944–1945
- Northrop P-61 Black Widow, 1947–1948
- North American F-82F Twin Mustang, 1948–1950
- Lockheed F-94A Starfire, 1950–1952
- Lockheed F-94B Starfire, 1952–1955
- Lockheed F-94C Starfire, 1955–1957
- Northrop F-89J Scorpion, 1957–1960
- Convair F-106A Delta Dart, 1960–1963; 1971–1972
- Lockheed F-104A Starfighter, 1963–1969
- Lockheed F-104B Starfighter, 1963–1969
- General Atomics MQ-9A Reaper 2022-

=== Awards and campaigns ===
Award streamer	Award	Dates	Notes
	Presidential Unit Citation	30 July 1943	Sardinia, 319th Fighter Squadron
	Presidential Unit Citation	30 January 1944	Italy, 319th Fighter Squadron
	Presidential Unit Citation	1 December 1952 – 30 April 1953	Korea, 319th Fighter-Interceptor Squadron
	Air Force Outstanding Unit Award	1 July 1977 – [30 November 1977]	319th Fighter-Interceptor Training Squadron
	Republic of Korea Presidential Unit Citation	23 March 1953 – 27 July 1953	319th Fighter-Interceptor Squadron

Campaign Streamer	Campaign	Dates	Notes
	Air Offensive, Europe	1 March 1943 – 5 June 1944	319th Fighter Squadron
	Air Combat, EAME Theater	1 March 1943 – 11 May 1945	319th Fighter Squadron
	Tunisia	1 March 1943 – 13 May 1943	319th Fighter Squadron
	Sicily	14 May 1943 – 17 August 1943	319th Fighter Squadron
	Naples-Foggia	18 August 1943 – 21 January 1944	319th Fighter Squadron
	Anzio	22 January 1944 – 24 May 1944	319th Fighter Squadron
	Rome-Arno	22 January 1944 – 9 September 1944	319th Fighter Squadron
	Normandy	6 June 1944 – 24 July 1944	319th Fighter Squadron
	Northern France	25 July 1944 – 14 September 1944	319th Fighter Squadron
	Southern France	15 August 1944 – 14 September 1944	319th Fighter Squadron
	North Apennines	10 September 1944 – 4 April 1945	319th Fighter Squadron
	Rhineland	15 September 1944 – 21 March 1945	319th Fighter Squadron
	Central Europe	22 March 1944 – 21 May 1945	319th Fighter Squadron
	Po Valley	3 April 1945 – 8 May 1945	319th Fighter Squadron
	Second Korean Winter	28 November 1951 – 30 April 1952	319th Fighter-Interceptor Squadron
	Korea Summer-Fall 1952	1 May 1952 – 30 November 1952	319th Fighter-Interceptor Squadron
	Third Korean Winter	1 December 1952 – 30 April 1953	319th Fighter-Interceptor Squadron
	Korea Summer-Fall 1953	1 May 1953 – 27 July 1953	319th Fighter-Interceptor Squadron

== See also ==
- USAF units and aircraft of the Korean War
- List of F-86 Sabre units
- F-89 Scorpion units of the United States Air Force
- F-94 Starfire units of the United States Air Force
- List of F-104 Starfighter operators
- List of F-106 Delta Dart units of the United States Air Force
