= Air Defense Weapons Center =

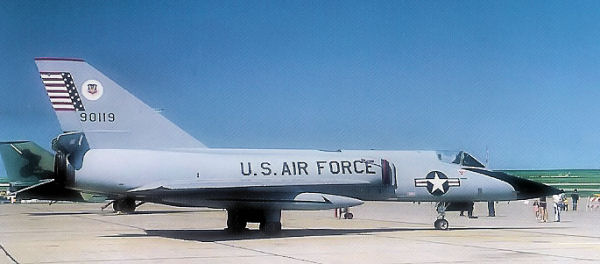
- Convair F-106A Delta Dart of the Air Defense Weapons Center, Tyndall AFB Florida, 1979.
- Active: 31 October 1967-12 September 1991
- Country: United States
- Branch: United States Air Force
- Garrison/HQ: Tyndall AFB, Florida

Commanders
- Notable commanders: Charles A. Horner

Insignia
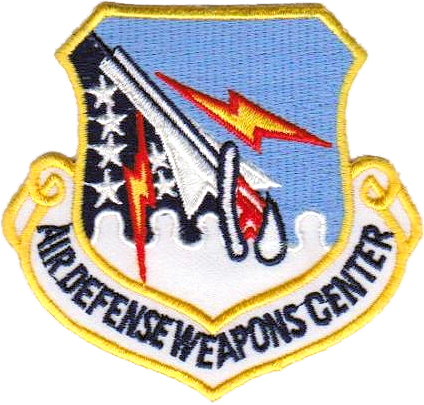
- Emblem of the Air Defense Weapons Center

Aircraft flown
- Electronic warfare: EB-57 Canberra
- Fighter: F-100 Super Sabre; F-4 Phantom II; F-15 Eagle; F-16 Fighting Falcon
- Interceptor: F-106 Delta Dart; F-102 Delta Dagger; F-101 Voodoo
- Trainer: T-38 Talon; T-33 Shooting Star; QF-100 Drone; QF-102 Drone

The Air Defense Weapons Center is an inactive unit of the United States Air Force, last stationed at Tyndall Air Force Base, Florida. It was last assigned to First Air Force, Tactical Air Command, and was inactivated on 12 September 1991

The Air Defense Weapons Center was the primary location for training air defense forces. Interceptor pilot training, as well as weapons controller training, was conducted there. Tactics research and development and weapons system evaluation were important aspects of the Weapons Center's mission. These programs, played an important role in the evaluation and training of air defense forces.

== Overview ==
Established in 1967, the Air Defense Weapons Center was a major training center for fighter-interceptor pilots. It was established after the closure of Vincent Air Force Base, Arizona and its transfer to the U.S. Marine Corps and establishment as Marine Corps Air Station Yuma. Air Defense Command, later redesignated Aerospace Defense Command, conducted gunnery training, air-to-air missile training and radar interceptor training at the school. It was a huge operation, maintaining large numbers of various interceptor aircraft, trainers, and drones for aerial targets.

With the inactivation of Aerospace Defense Command in 1979, the Center reorganized on 1 July 1981, relieving the Commander of the day-to-day management of operations, aircraft maintenance, and test efforts. This reorganization did not change the mission of the Weapons Center, though it did change how it operated.

A new organization was activated, the 325th Fighter Weapons Wing (FWW). The 325th FWW, through its subordinate units, conducted an extensive training program for air defense aircrews and weapons controllers; the USAF Interceptor Weapons School (IWS) trained instructors in all phases of interceptor weapons systems and employment. The Center continued its work in developing, validating, and testing air defense doctrine, tactics, and procedures, as well as development and standardization of fighter weapons techniques and training methods.

Previously, F-106 training was conducted by the 2d Fighter Interceptor Training Squadron (FITS). This unit was re-designated the 2d Fighter Weapons Squadron (FWS) on 1 February 1982. The 2d FWS's mission continued to be F-106 training with plans to convert to the F-15 starting in the fall of 1983.

The 95th Fighter Interceptor Training Squadron, also a part of the Weapons Center, provided T-33 qualification and upgrade training as well as support for 2d FWS aircrew training, weapons controller training, and target support for air defense exercises. Additionally, all continental USAF sub-scale and full-scale drone aerial target operations were consolidated in the 82d Tactical Aerial Targets Squadron (TATS).

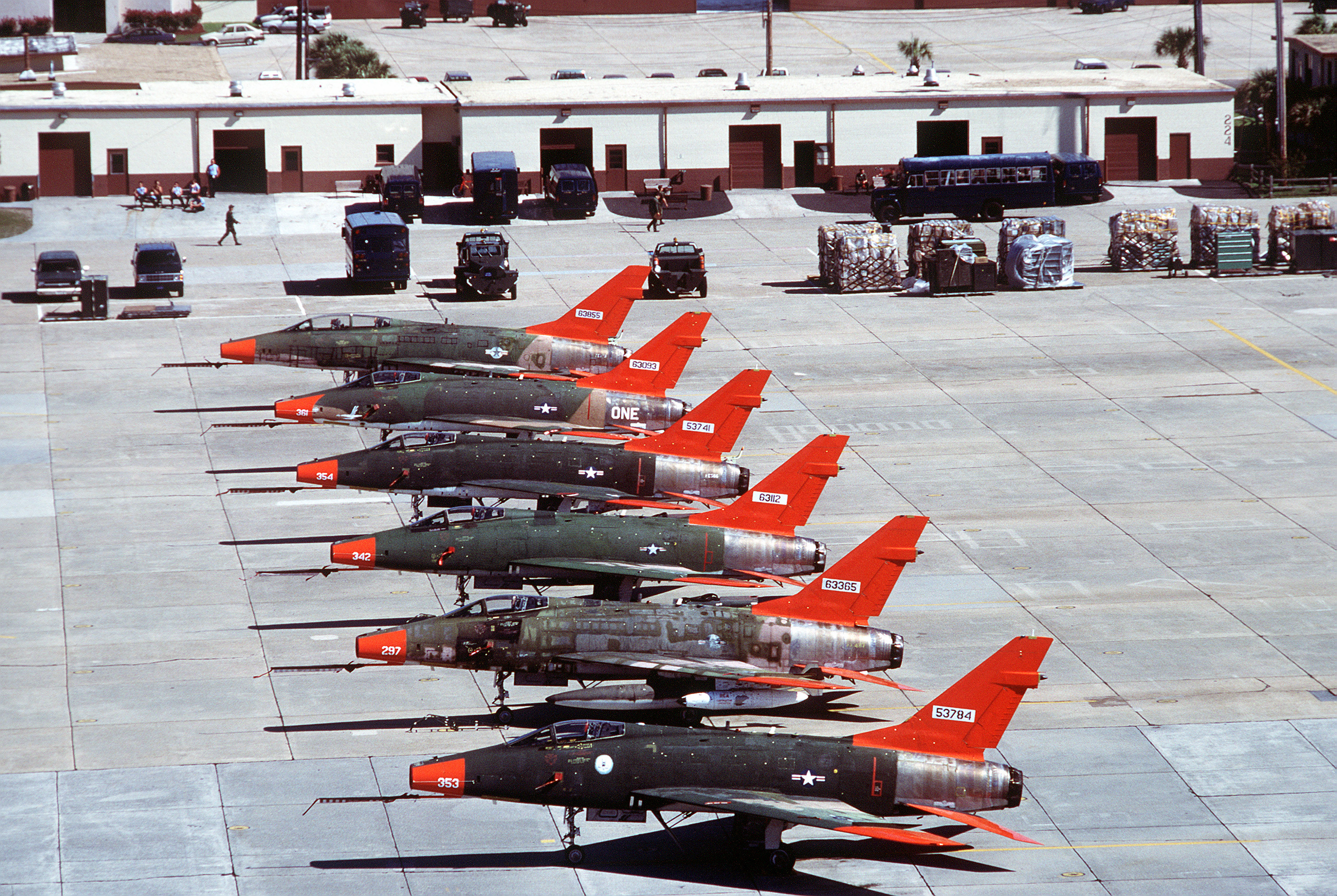
North American QF-100 Super Sabre target drones on the flight line Tyndall Air Force Base, Florida, on 25 April 1990

Training programs conducted by the Center included Copper Flag and Checkered Flag. Copper Flag was the equivalent of TAC's Red Flag, and was held at the ADWC. The first Copper Flag exercise was held in April 1982. It provided aircrew, weapons controller, and command and control training against enemy tactics and capabilities in scenarios covering the full range of attack and defense options. Checkered Flag exercises provided aircrew and ground personnel training in operating from a deployed location. ADTAC forces study and execute carefully developed plans related to deploying to a specific staging base, and operating from that base throughout all aspects of their mission.

Brigadier General Charles A. Horner, the USAF Air Defense Weapons Center commander, flew in the 325th Tactical Training Wing's first F-15 Eagle on 7 December 1983. The center was inactivated on 12 September 1991. First Air Force held a change of command and was officially relocated from Langley AFB, Virginia, to Tyndall AFB, Florida. On 1 October the 325th Tactical Training Wing was re-designated as the 325th Fighter Wing, when it implemented the objective wing organization. Today, the 325th Fighter Wing remains at Tyndall AFB providing air dominance training for F-22 Raptor pilots.

== Lineage ==
- Established as the Air Defense Weapons Center activated and organized on 31 October 1967
- Redesignated United States Air Force Air Defense Weapons Center on 1 March 1981

Inactivated on 12 September 1991

=== Assignments ===
- Air Defense Command (later Aerospace Defense Command), 31 October 1967
- Air Defense, Tactical Air Command, 1 October 1979
- First Air Force, 6 December 1985 – 12 September 1991

=== Components ===
- 325th Fighter Weapons Wing, 1 July 1981 – 15 October 1983
- 2d Fighter-Interceptor Training Squadron, 1 September 1974 - 12 September 1991
- 62d Fighter-Interceptor Training Squadron, 1 September 1974 - 30 June 1975
- 95th Fighter-Interceptor Training Squadron, 1 September 1974 - 12 September 1991
- 319th Fighter Interceptor Training Squadron, 1 June 1975 – 30 November 1977
- 82d Aerial Targets Squadron, 1 July 1981 - 12 September 1991

=== Stations ===
- Tyndall Air Force Base, Florida, 31 October 1967 – 12 September 1991
