= 3920th Strategic Wing =

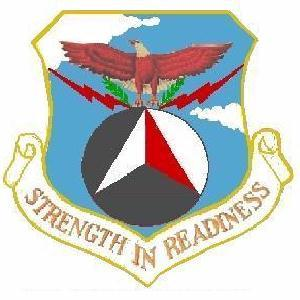
- Wing emblem
- Active: 1952-1965
- Country: United States
- Branch: United States Air Force
- Role: Support for deployed strategic units
- Motto: Strength in Readiness

The 3920th Strategic Wing is an inactive United States Air Force unit, discontinued on 31 March 1965. The wing was a non-flying ground service support element for the 7th Air Division of Strategic Air Command (SAC), based at RAF Brize Norton, Oxfordshire, in the United Kingdom. It was established on 1 December 1952 as the 3920th Air Base Group. When activated, the wing assumed the resources (manpower, equipment, and facilities) of the 7503d Air Support Wing, which had been established on 25 May 1951. Throughout its existence it was controlled by SAC and served as the host for deployed SAC bombardment, strategic reconnaissance, and air refueling units.

== Strategic Air Command Support ==
The group, which was upgraded to a wing in 1964, provided host station support functions primarily for SAC Boeing B-47 Stratojet and Boeing KC-97 Stratofreighter elements deployed to RAF Brize Norton during deployments, including Operation Reflex deployments, from United States bases. It was organized when Strategic Air Command (SAC) assumed responsibility to support its deployed elements from United States Air Forces Europe in 1952 and was responsible for managing the Brize Norton Task Force, Provisional. Special weapons support was provided by the 4th Aviation Field Depot Squadron (later 4th Aviation Depot Squadron) from 1951 to 1956 and by the 2nd Aviation Depot Squadron (later 2nd Munitions Maintenance Squadron) after 1956. These squadrons were assigned to the 7th Air Division, but attached to the 3920th.

On 1 July 1960 an RB-47 deployed from the 55th Strategic Reconnaissance Wing at Forbes Air Force Base, Kansas was shot down by the Soviet Air Defence Forces while operating from Brize Norton. The 3920th was discontinued in 1965 when SAC reassigned the remaining assets of unit to the Detachment 1, 98th Strategic Wing at RAF Upper Heyford and returned control of Brize Norton to the Royal Air Force.

== Lineage ==
- Designated as the 3920th Air Base Group and organized on 1 November 1952
- Redesignated 3920th Combat Support Group on 1 January 1959
- Redesignated 3920th Strategic Wing on 1 February 1964
- Discontinued on 31 March 1965

=== Assignment ===
- 7th Air Division, 1 November 1952 – 31 March 1965

=== Station ===
- RAF Brize Norton, 1 November 1952 – 31 March 1965

=== Components ===
- 3920th Air Police Squadron (later 3920th Combat Defense Squadron), 1 November 1952 – 1 January 1959
- 3920th Field Maintenance Squadron (later 3920th Consolidated Aircraft Maintenance Squadron), 1 November 1952 – 31 March 1965
- 3920th Food Service Squadron, 1 November 1952 – 1 January 1959
- 3920th Installations Squadron (later 3920th Civil Engineering Squadron), 1 November 1952 – 31 March 1965
- 3920th Medical Squadron later 3920th USAF Infirmary, 3920th USAF Dispensary, 1 November 1952 – 1 January 1959
- 3920th Motor Vehicle Squadron (later 3920th Transportation Squadron), 1 November 1952 – 1 January 1959
- 3920th Operations Squadron, 1 November 1952 – 31 March 1965
- 3920th Supply Squadron, 1 November 1952 – 1 January 1959
- 3920th Air Base Squadron (later 3920th Combat Support Squadron), 1961 - 31 March 1965

== See also ==
- List of MAJCOM wings of the United States Air Force
