= Wayne W. Lambert =

United States Air Force general

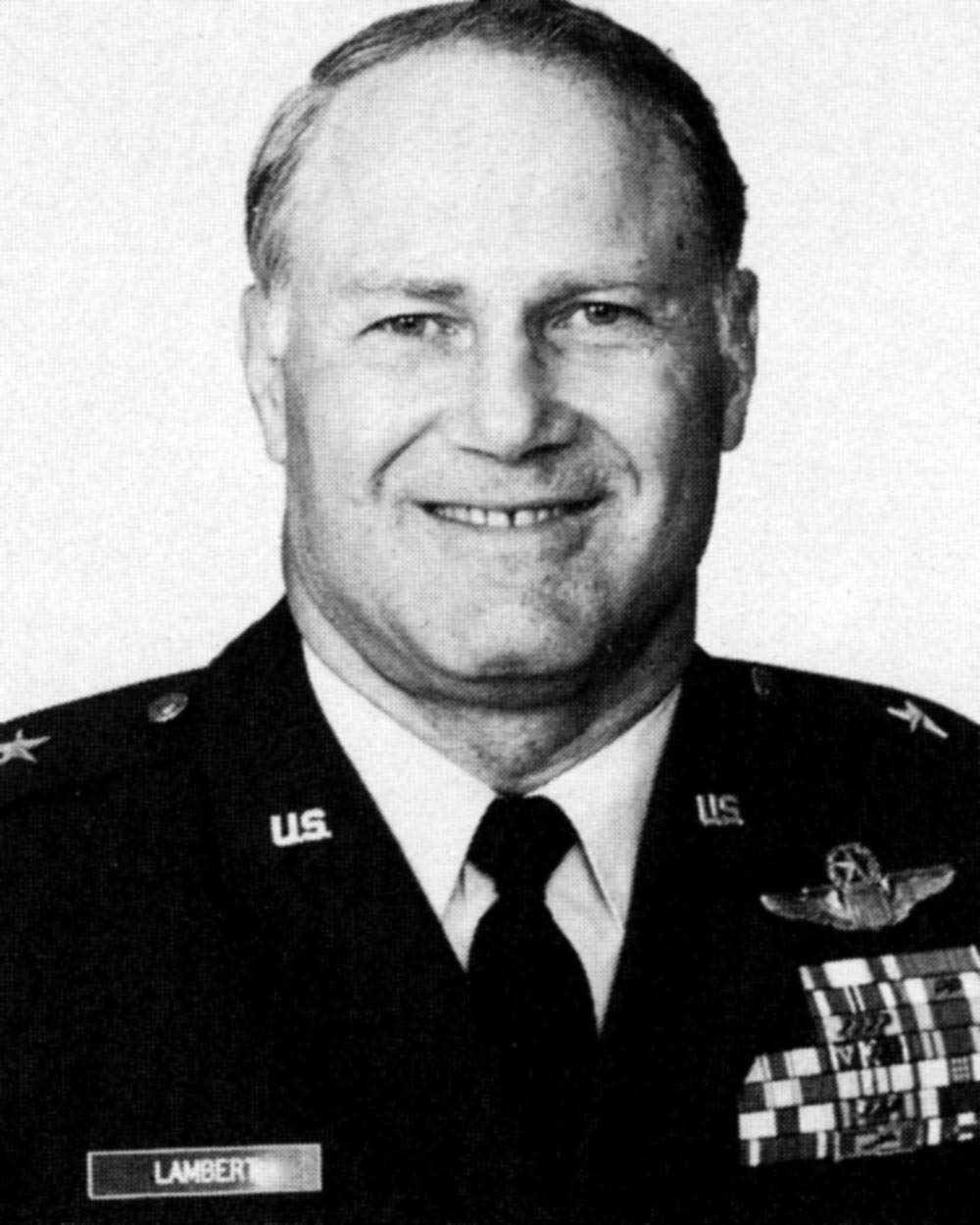
- Born: January 3, 1936 (age 90); Bainbridge, Georgia
- Military career
- Allegiance: United States
- Branch: United States Air Force
- Service years: 1959–1989
- Rank: Brigadier general
- Commands: 7th Air Division
- Conflicts: Vietnam War
- Awards: Air Force Distinguished Service Medal; Legion of Merit; Distinguished Flying Cross; Air Medal (10)

Wayne Winston Lambert (born January 3, 1936) is a former Air Force Brigadier General (United States). He attended the United States Military Academy at West Point, New York, after already having served a year in the US Army. Lambert graduated from the academy in 1959 with a B.S. degree in military science and was commissioned a 2nd lieutenant in the USAF that same year. He trained as a bomber pilot, receiving his Aviator badge in 1960. He has logged over 5,800 flying hours with the US Air Force. A seasoned combat veteran, Lambert flew over 225 combat missions in South East Asia as a B-52 crew member. He was awarded the Distinguished Flying Cross and received 10 awards of the Air Medal for his service during the Vietnamese War. After serving in a succession of lesser command positions, Lambert was promoted to the rank of brigadier general in 1983, assuming command of the former Strategic Air Command's 7th Air Division, headquartered then at Ramstein Air Base in West Germany, and overseeing SAC operations throughout the European theater. The brigadier general retired from the US Air Force in 1989.

Born in Bainbridge, Georgia, Lambert graduated from Climax High School in 1953 and attended Sullivan Preparatory School in Washington, D.C. before enlisting in the Army. He also holds an MBA from Chapman College ('76). Lambert completed courses at the Air Command and Staff College and the Industrial College of the Armed Forces in 1973 and the Army War College in 1977. His son Wayne W. Lambert Jr. is a 1984 graduate of West Point who served as an Army field artillery officer.

In retirement, Lambert publicly supported U.S. presidential candidate Mitt Romney and U.S. vice presidential candidate Paul Ryan in the 2012 general election.
