= 3918th Strategic Wing =

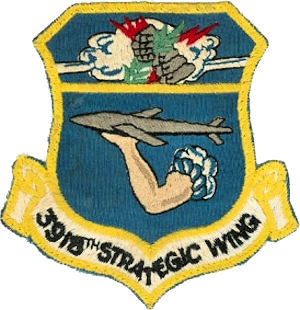
- Emblem of the 3918th Strategic Wing
- Active: 1964–1965
- Country: United States
- Branch: United States Air Force
- Type: MAJCOM organization
- Role: Support for deployed nuclear units
- Part of: 7th Air Division
- Garrison/HQ: RAF Upper Heyford, Oxfordshire

Commanders
- Notable commanders: Maj Gen Timothy J. Dacey, Jr.

The 3918th Strategic Wing (3918th SW) is an inactive United States Air Force unit, discontinued on 31 March 1965.

The 3918th SW was a ground service support element for the Strategic Air Command 7th Air Division (AD), stationed at RAF Upper Heyford, Oxfordshire, in the United Kingdom. It was upgraded to wing status on 1 February 1964 and discontinued on 31 March 1965. Throughout most of its existence it was controlled by Strategic Air Command, under the 7th Air Division (AD) and stationed at RAF Upper Heyford.

The wing provided host station support functions primarily for SAC B/RB-36 Peacemaker, B-47 Stratojet, B-52 Stratofortess, & KC-97 Tanker Wing and Support Elements deployed to Upper Heyford during Operation Reflex deployments from United States bases. In addition to its assigned units, the 1st Aviation Field Depot Squadron (later 1st Aviation Depot Squadron) and the 11th Aviation Depot Squadron (later 11th Munitions Maintenance Squadron), which were assigned to 7th AD and attached to the wing and were responsible for the control of nuclear weapons ("special weapons") at Upper Heyford.

It was inactivated in 1965 and replaced by USAFE's 7514th Combat Support Group (CSG) as the host base operating unit when SAC turned control over Upper Heyford to the United States Air Forces in Europe. Detachment 1, 98th Strategic Wing assumed the SAC mission.

== Lineage ==
- Designated as the 7509th Air Base Squadron and organized on 7 July 1950
- Redesignated as 7509th Air Base Group on 25 May 1951
- Transferred from USAFE to SAC on 1 January 1952 and redesignated 3918th Air Base Group
- Redesignated 3918th Combat Support Group on 1 May 1959
- Redesignated 3918th Strategic Wing on 1 May 1964
- Discontinued on 31 March 1965

=== Assignments ===
- 3d Air Division, 7 July 1950
- Third Air Force, 1 May 1951
- Seventh Air Division, 1 January 1952 – 31 March 1965

=== Station ===
- RAF Upper Heyford 7 July 1950 – 31 March 1965

=== Components ===
- 3918th Air Base Squadron (later 3918th Support Squadron), 1 January 1959 – 31 March 1965
- 3918th Combat Defense Squadron, 1 July 1962 – 31 March 1965
- 3918th Field Maintenance Squadron (later 3918th Consolidated Aircraft Maintenance Squadron), 15 October 1955 – 31 March 1965
- 7509th Air Police Squadron (later 3918th Air Police Squadron), 25 May 1951 – 1 January 1959
- 7509th Food Service Squadron (later 3918th Food Service Squadron), 25 May 1951 – 1 January 1959
- 7509th Installations Squadron (later 3918th Installations Squadron, 3918th Civil Engineering Squadron), 25 May 1951 – 31 March 1965
- 7509th Medical Squadron (later 3918th Medical Squadron, 3918th USAF Infirmary, 3918th USAF Dispensary), 25 May 1951 – 31 Mar 1965
- 7509th Motor Vehicle Squadron (later 3918th Motor Vehicle Squadron, 3918th Transportation Squadron), 25 May 1951 – 31 Mar 1965
- 7509th Operations Squadron (later 3918th Operations Squadron), 25 May 1951 – 31 Mar 1965
- 7509th Supply Squadron (later 3918th Supply Squadron), 25 May 1951 – 31 Mar 1965

== See also ==
- List of MAJCOM wings of the United States Air Force
