= 7th Air Division (United States) =

- Active: 1944-1948; 1951-1965; 1978–1992
- Country: United States
- Branch: United States Air Force
- Role: Command of strike forces
- Equipment: see #Aircraft section below
- Decorations: Air Force Outstanding Unit Award

Commanders
- Notable commanders: Lt Gen Archie J. Old; Gen John P. McConnell; Brig Gen Wayne W. Lambert

Insignia
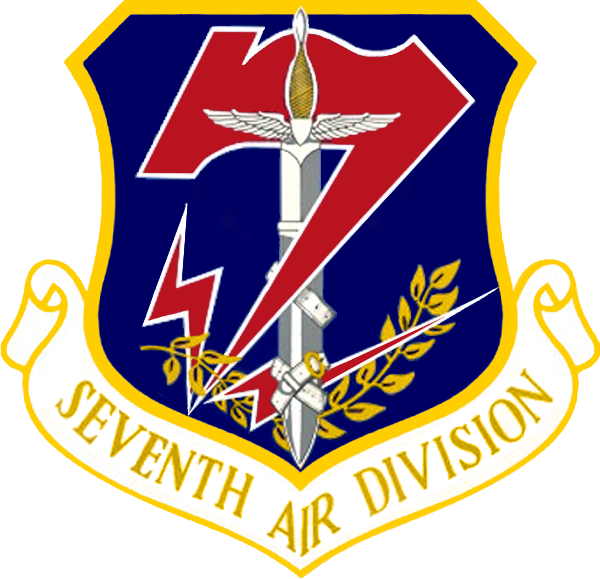
- 7th Air Division emblem (Note: Approved 16 September 1954. Description: Blue within a narrow yellow border, a vertical white sword partially sheathed, point down, the hilt in the shape of wings, the handle diagonally striped blue and yellow the sword interlaced with a red seven terminating in a pointed foot between two smaller red flashes, all three outlined in white; interlaced with the flashes and behind the sword a spray of yellow laurel leaves.)

The 7th Air Division served the United States Air Force between early 1944 and early 1992, earning an Air Force Outstanding Unit Award and a service streamer along the way.

== History ==
=== Hawaii ===
As the 7th Fighter Wing, the division provided air defense of the Hawaiian Islands from 21 April 1944, assigned to VII Fighter Command, and then Army Air Forces, Pacific Ocean Areas. 15th Fighter Group and 21st Fighter Group came under the command of the wing at different times in 1944.

On 15 December 1947 the wing was redesignated the 7 Air Division, but then inactivated on 1 May 1948. It was organized again on the same day, but then discontinued on 3 September 1948.

=== Strategic Air Command rotation to England ===
Strategic Air Command (SAC) formed two air divisions in early 1951. The 7th Air Division was formed for its bases in England, while the 5th Air Division was and activated at Offutt Air Force Base, Nebraska, where Maj Gen Archie J. Old, Jr. formed its cadre before it moved overseas to control SAC units in Morocco. The 7th, led by Brig Gen Paul T. Cullen, was the first to deploy, leaving for England in March, but the Douglas C-124 Globemaster II aircraft carrying General Cullen and his staff ditched in the Atlantic, leaving no survivors. General Old hastily flew to England, where he took command of the 7th Division until Maj Gen John P. McConnell could arrive. Once a new commander was appointed in May, General Old and his staff left for Morocco.

The division controlled deployed bombardment and reconnaissance forces between 1951 and 1965. During the 1950s, SAC's presence in England grew, with nine bases being constructed for the use of SAC bombers, and another six throughout the United Kingdom for support of SAC activities. In 1953, shortly after the death of Stalin, the first Boeing B-47 Stratojets, from the 306th Bombardment Wing, arrived in England for 90 days duty, beginning what would be known as Reflex operations in the United Kingdom.

On 26 July 1956, a Boeing B-47 Stratojet under the division's operational control was practicing touch-and-go landings at RAF Lakenheath crashed into a nuclear weapons storage facility causing damage to several weapons stored at the site.

It participated in alerts, exercises, operational readiness inspections, evaluations, and intensive training programs to provide an advanced combat ready force. It also assumed responsibility for air base construction and improvement, which included building complexes to accommodate bombers, fighters, and special functions such as communications, weapons storage, aircraft parts, and navigational aids.

In September 1957, B-47s in Morocco were put on ground alert, armed, fueled and ready to take off upon notice. This posture was expanded to the bases under the 7th Air Division's command in early 1958. For the remainder of the division's existence, this status, known as Reflex Action (usually shortened to just Reflex), would be the normal status for the Stratojets rotating through England. The number of 7th Air Division bases used for Reflex reached a peak of nine in early 1959.

The development of Intermediate Range Ballistic Missiles by the Soviet Union made forward bases for SAC medium range bombers increasingly vulnerable. After 1958, when the 100th Bombardment Wing departed RAF Brize Norton, SAC bombardment wings no longer rotated as entire units, although six bombers continued on alert at each of the division's bomber bases. The number of B-47 wings capable of sending aircraft to Reflex operations at the division's bases began to decline after 1958. The replacement of the medium bomber by the heavy bomber and the intercontinental ballistic missile in the SAC inventory continued into the early 1960s and this removed the need for SAC bases in England, leading to the inactivation of the division in June 1965.

=== Strategic Air Command in Europe ===
From 1978, the division was activated in Europe to provide command and control for SAC units assigned to USAFE, primarily air refueling and reconnaissance organizations, but also ground support units such as the 3920th Strategic Wing. It assured that assigned units trained to conduct strategic warfare according to the Emergency War Order. It also assured that assigned units could conduct strategic reconnaissance and air refueling and function as the nucleus of a SAC advanced echelon in event of contingency operations.

=== 7th Air Division in Desert Shield and Desert Storm ===
Source: Gulf War Air Power Survey Vol V., 21–25.

- 801st Air Refueling Wing (Provisional)

Headquarters: Morón Air Base, Spain 37°10′29″N 05°36′57″W

Squadron	Aircraft type	Notes
801st Air Refueling Squadron (P)	KC-135 Stratotanker	Deployed from 2d Bombardment Wing, Barksdale AFB, Louisiana (15 Aircraft) August 1990–March 1991

- 801st Bombardment Wing (Provisional)

Headquarters: Morón Air Base, Spain
The 801st BW (P) consisted of 28 B-52G Stratofortresses and was formed around a nucleus provided by the 2d Bombardment Wing at Barksdale AFB, Louisiana and drew aircraft from the crews of the 524th BS/379th BW, Wurtsmith AFB, Michigan; the 668th BS/416th BW at Griffiss AFB, New York and from 69th BS/42d BW at Loring AFB, Maine. One B-52G (52-6503) was sent from the 340th BS/97th BW at Eaker AFB, Arkansas.

Squadron	Aircraft type	Notes
801st Bombardment Squadron (P)	B-52G Stratofortress	Deployed from 2d BW (7 Aircraft); 69th BS/42d BW (2 Aircraft); 668th BS/416th BW (8 Aircraft) January–March 1991
802d Bombardment Squadron (P)	B-52G Stratofortress	Deployed from 524th BS/379th BW (8 Aircraft); 340th BS/97th BW (1 Aircraft); 524th BS/379th BW (8 Aircraft) January–March 1991

- 802d Air Refueling Wing (Provisional)

Headquarters: Lajes Field, Azores, Portugal 38°45′42″N 027°05′26″W

Squadron	Aircraft type	Notes
802d Air Refueling Squadron (P)	KC-135 Stratotanker; KC-10 Extender	Composed of flights (August 1990-March 1991) from: 97th Bombardment Wing, Eaker AFB, Arkansas (KC-135); 2d Bombardment Wing, Barksdale AFB, Louisiana (KC-135) (KC-10); 92d Bombardment Wing, Fairchild AFB, Washington (KC-135); 7th Bombardment Wing, Carswell AFB, Texas (KC-135)

- 804th Air Refueling Wing (Provisional)

Headquarters: Incirlik Air Base, Turkey 37°00′07″N 035°25′33″E

Squadron	Aircraft type	Notes
804th Air Refueling Squadron (P)	KC-135 Stratotanker	August 1990-March 1991

- 806th Bombardment Wing (Provisional)

Headquarters: RAF Fairford, England 51°40′56″N 001°47′24″W
The 806th BW (P) was formed around a cadre of air and ground crews provided by the 97th Bombardment Wing, Eaker AFB, Arkansas. It consisted of a total of 11 B-52G Stratofortresses, also being drawn from the 668th BS/416th BW at Griffiss AFB, New York; 596th BS/2d BW, Barksdale AFB, Louisiana, and the 328th BS/93d BW at Castle AFB, California.

Squadron	Aircraft type	Notes
806th Bombardment Squadron	B-52G Stratofortress	97th BW (6 Aircraft); 596th BS/2d BW (2 Aircraft); 668th BS/416th BW (2 Aircraft); 328th BS/93d BW (1 Aircraft) January–March 1991

- 807th Air Refueling Wing (Provisional)

Headquarters: Incirlik Air Base, Turkey

Squadron	Aircraft type	Notes
807th Air Refueling Squadron (P)	KC-135 Stratotanker	August 1990–March 1991

- 810th Air Refueling Wing (Provisional)

Headquarters: Incirlik Air Base, Turkey

Squadron	Aircraft Type	Notes
810th Air Refueling Squadron (P)	KC-135 Stratotanker	August 1990-March 1991

- 4300th Bombardment Wing (Provisional)

Headquarters: Diego Garcia, British Indian Ocean Territory [BIOT] 7°18′48″S 72°24′40″E
The lead unit for the 4300th BW (P) was the 69th Bomb Squadron/42d BW from Loring AFB, Maine. Aircraft were also drawn from the 328th BS/93d BW at Castle AFB, California. Six aircraft were transferred to Jeddah, Saudi Arabia, on 17 January 1991 and they were replaced by six B-52Gs from the 1500th SW (P) at Andersen AFB, Guam.

Squadron	Aircraft type	Notes
4300th Bombardment Squadron (P)	B-52G Stratofortress	Composed of 69th BS/42d BW (16 Aircraft); 328th BS/93d BW (16 Aircraft)

== Lineage ==
- Established as the 7 Fighter Wing on 31 March 1944

Activated on 21 April 1944
Redesignated 7 Air Division on 15 December 1947
Inactivated on 1 May 1948

- Organized on 1 May 1948

Discontinued on 3 September 1948

- Activated on 20 March 1951

Inactivated on 16 June 1952

- Organized on 16 June 1952

Discontinued on 30 June 1965

- Activated on 1 July 1978

Inactivated on 1 February 1992

=== Assignments ===
- Seventh Air Force, 21 April 1944 (attached to VII Fighter Command after 24 April 1944)
- Army Air Forces, Pacific Ocean Area, 15 August 1944
- Provisional Army Air Forces, Middle Pacific, attached 1 July 1945 and assigned, 22 November 1945
- Seventh Air Force (later Pacific Air Command), 1 January 1946 – 1 May 1948
- Pacific Air Command, 1 May – 3 September 1948
- Strategic Air Command, 20 March 1951 – 16 June 1952; 16 June 1952 – 30 June 1965; 1 July 1978
- Strategic Air Command, 16 June 1952 – 30 June 1965
- Strategic Air Command, 1 July 1978
- Eighth Air Force, 31 January 1982 – 1 February 1992

=== Components ===
Wings

- 17th Reconnaissance Wing: 1 October 1982 – 30 June 1991
- 81st Fighter Wing: 1 May – 3 September 1948
- 306th Strategic Wing: 1 July 1978 – 1 February 1992
- 706th Strategic Missile Wing: 20 February 1958 – 1 April 1960 (not operational)
- Hickam (later, 6502) Composite Wing: 1 May – 3 September 1948
- 3918th Strategic Wing: See 3918th Air Base Group
- 3920th Strategic Wing: See 3920th Air Base Group

Groups

- 11th Strategic Group: 15 November 1978 – 7 August 1990
- 15th Fighter Group: attached 1 August 1944 – 5 February 1945; attached 30 November 1945 – 1 March 1946; assigned 22 April – 15 October 1946
- 21st Fighter Group: assigned 3 July – 10 November 1944, attached 10 November 1944 – 9 February 1945
- 30th Bombardment Group: 15 August 1945 – 1 March 1946 (not operational 15 February – 1 March 1946)
- 81st Fighter Group: 15 October 1946 – 1 May 1948
- 508th Fighter Group: attached 6 January – 25 November 1945
- 3909th Air Base Group, 16 June 1952 – 15 August 1955
- 3910th Air Base Group (later 3910th Combat Squpport Group), 16 May 1951 – 1 October 1959
- 3911th Air Base Group, 16 May 1951 – c. 1 June 1952
- 3912 Combat Support Group, 1 January 1959 – c. 1 September 1959
- 3913 Combat Support Group, 1 January 1959 – 1 September 1959
- 3914 Combat Support Group, 1 January 1959 – c. 1 September 1959
- 3917th Air Base Group, 16 May 1951 – c. 30 Jun 1954
- 3918th Air Base Group (later 3918th Combat Support Group, 3918th Strategic Wing), 16 June 1952 – 31 March 1965
- 3919th Air Base Group, 16 June 1952 – c. 1 October 1955
- 3920th Air Base Group (later 3920th Combat Support Group, 3920th Strategic Wing), 1 November 1952 – 31 March 1965
- 3928th Air Base Group, June 1954 – 1 August 1958
- 3931th Air Base Group, 17 April 1954 – c. 30 June 1955

Squadrons

- 1st Aviation Field Depot Squadron (later 1st Aviation Depot Squadron): 19 May 1951 – 1 May 1958
- 2nd Aviation Field Depot Squadron (later 1st Aviation Depot Squadron): 19 May 1951 – 30 April 1965
- 4th Aviation Field Depot Squadron (later 1st Aviation Depot Squadron): July 1951 – 1 July 1960
- 6th Night Fighter Squadron: attached 27 September – 11 December 1944; assigned 12 May 1945 – 1 March 1946; assigned 22 April – 31 May 1946
- 11th Aviation Depot Squadron: 1 December 1958 – 30 April 1965
- 19th Surveillance Squadron: 1 December 1979 – 1 May 1983
- 41st Photographic Reconnaissance Squadron: 18 April – 13 June 1945
- 43d Reconnaissance Squadron: attached 20 September 1945 – 22 February 1946 (further attached to 30 Bombardment Group for same period)
- 99th Aviation Depot Squadron (later 99th Munitions Maintenance Squadron): 23 May 1958 – 20 December 1963
- 305th Fighter Control Squadron, 15 August 1944 – 14 July 1945
- 548th Night Fighter Squadron: 16 September – 20 October 1944
- 549th Night Fighter Squadron: 20 October – 1 November 1944

=== Stations ===
- Fort Shafter, Hawaii, 21 April 1944
- Wheeler Field (later Wheeler Army Air Base, Wheeler Air Force Base), Hawaii, 18 November 1946 – 1 May 1948
- Hickam Air Force Base, Hawaii, 1 May 1948 – 3 September 1948
- RAF South Ruislip, England, 20 March 1951 – 16 June 1952; 16 June 1952
- U.S. Air Base High Wycombe (later, High Wycombe Air Station), England, 1 July 1958 – 30 June 1965
- Ramstein Air Base, Germany, 1 July 1978 – 1 February 1992

=== Aircraft ===
- Douglas A-24 Banshee: 1944
- Douglas RA-24 Banshee: 1944–1945
- Consolidated B-24 Liberator: 1944–1945, 1945–1946
- Consolidated F-7 Liberator: 1945–1946
- North American B-25 Mitchell: 1944–1945
- North American TB-25 Mitchell: 1945
- Martin B-26 Marauder: 1944–1945
- Lockheed P-38 Lightning: 1944–1945
- Lockheed F-5 Lightning: 1945
- Bell P-39 Airacobra: 1944
- Curtiss P-40 Warhawk: 1944
- Republic P-47 Thunderbolt (later F-47): 1944–1945, 1948
- North American P-51 Mustang: 1944–1946, 1946–1947
- Northrop P-61 Black Widow 1944–1946
- Douglas P-70 Havoc: 1944
- UC-7 [sic]: 1944–1945
- Douglas A-26 Invader (later B-26): 1945–1946, 1948
- Boeing B-17 Flying Fortress: 1945–1946
- Boeing TB-17 Flying Fortress: 1945–1946
- Boeing ERB-17 Flying Fortreaa: 1946
- Boeing SB-17 Flying Fortress: 1948.
- CQ-3 Expeditor: 1945
- Stinson L-5 Sentinel: 1945–1946
- Culver PQ-14 Cadet: 1945–1946
- Curtiss C-46 Commando: 1948
- Douglas C-54 Skymaster: 1948
- Stinson L-5 Sentinel: 1948;
- Boeing B-29 Superfortress: 1951–1953
- Boeing KB-29 Superfortress: 1951–1953
- Boeing RB-29 Superfortress: 1951–1952
- Boeing ERB-29 Superfortress: 1955–1956
- North American B-45 Tornado: 1951–1952;
- North American RB-45 Tornado: 1951–1952;
- Boeing B-50 Superfortress: 1952–1956
- Boeing RB-50 Superfortress: 1952–1956
- Republic F-84 Thunderjet: 1951, 1953, 1955
- Convair B-36 Peacemaker: 1952–1956
- Convair RB-36 Peacemaker: 1951–1954
- Douglas C-47 Skytrain: 1952–1953;
- Boeing B-47 Stratojet: 1953–1965;
- Boeing RB-47 Stratojet: 1954, 1956–1965;
- Boeing KC-97 Stratofreighter: 1953–1958, 1962–1964
- Martin RB-57 Canberra: 1959
- Lockheed U-2: 1962
- Convair B-58 Hustler: 1964

After activation on 1 July 1978, the division controlled aircraft such as the: KC-135 Stratotanker, B-52 Stratofortress, RC-135V/W Rivet Joint, SR-71 Blackbird, and U-2 Dragon Lady.

== See also ==
- List of United States Air Force air divisions
