= RAF Upper Heyford =

Royal Air Force station

RAF Upper Heyford
- Upper Heyford, Oxfordshire in England
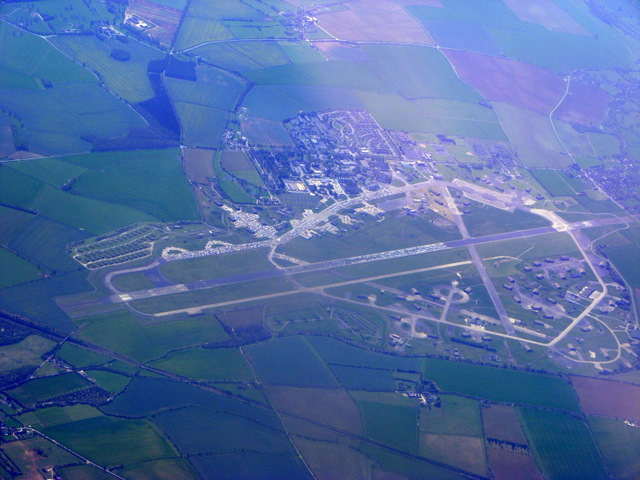

Site information
- Type: RAF flying station (US Visiting Forces)
- Code: UH
- Owner: Ministry of Defence
- Operator: Royal Air Force (1918–1919); Royal Air Force (1927–1950); United States Air Force (1950–1994)
- Controlled by: RAF Bomber Command * No. 6 (T) Group RAF * No. 92 (OTU) Group RAF
- Condition: Closed

Location
- Location in Oxfordshire RAF Upper Heyford (the United Kingdom)
- Coordinates: 51°56′13″N 001°15′12″W
- Grid reference: SP515260

Site history
- Built: 1918
- Built by: John Laing & Son Ltd
- In use: 1918–1919; October 1927–1994
- Fate: Site sold, several buildings in various civilian uses and other areas redeveloped for housing.; Several areas and buildings given scheduled or listed status.
- Battles/wars: European theatre of World War II; Cold War

Airfield information
- Identifiers: IATA: UHF, ICAO: EGUA, WMO: 03655
- Elevation: 132 metres (433 ft) AMSL
Runways
Direction	Length and surface
09/27	2,530 metres (8,301 ft) Asphalt

Royal Air Force Upper Heyford or more simply RAF Upper Heyford is a former Royal Air Force station located 5 miles (8 km) north-west of Bicester near the village of Upper Heyford, Oxfordshire, England. In the Second World War the airfield was used by RAF Bomber Command. During the Cold War, Upper Heyford was one of the former RAF bases chosen to house the United States Air Force Strategic Air Command (SAC) nuclear-capable bombers on 90-day TDY (Temporary Duty) deployments until 1959, SAC Operation Reflex deployments from 1959 until 1965, from 1966 United States Air Forces in Europe (USAFE) tactical reconnaissance aircraft, and from 1970 General Dynamics F-111 Aardvark strike aircraft.

== Royal Air Force ==
Work on clearing the site began on 1 June 1918 when a detachment of the Canadian Forestry Corps arrived after completing similar work at RAF Hooton Park, near Ellesmere Port. The station was opened in July 1918 by the Royal Air Force. In November the Canadian Air Force was formed at Upper Heyford, by renumbering two RAF squadrons and posting in Canadian pilots and observers, and groundcrew trained at RAF Halton. After the British government cut funding for the squadrons in June 1919, the Canadian government decided that a permanent peacetime air force was not needed and so both squadrons ceased operations. Consequently by mid-1920 the aerodrome had closed, and the land returned to the owners, New College, Oxford, to lease out for agricultural use.

In 1923 there were concerns over the French occupation of the Rhineland after Germany had defaulted on the payment of war reparations. Upper Heyford was one of the sites chosen for a new strategic bomber force capable of attacking targets in France. Upper Heyford was intended to be the blueprint for the other bases. Land for the new airfield and technical site was purchased in 1924, and for the domestic site in 1925. Rising costs and delays mean that the first aircraft (the Oxford University Air Squadron) did not arrive until October 1927. In January 1928 No. 99 Squadron RAF arrived from RAF Bircham Newton with their Handley Page Hyderabad bombers. These were replaced, firstly by Handley Page Hinaidi, and later by Handley Page Heyford bombers. In November 1934 the Heyfords of No. 99 squadron departed RAF Upper Heyford.

In October 1931 No. 18 Squadron RAF was reformed at RAF Upper Heyford, equipped with Hawker Hart light bombers. On 5 September 1932 they were joined by No. 57 Squadron RAF also with Hawker Harts. Both squadrons later received Hawker Hind biplane bombers, before joining No.2 Group on 1 January 1939, and re-equipping with Bristol Blenheim I monoplane twin-engined bombers in March 1938/May 1939.

At the outbreak of the Second World War, both Bristol Blenheim squadrons were deployed to France with the B.E.F., but on their return after the fall of France they were relocated to other bases.

The rearmament of Germany in the 1930s led to a change in primary role for Upper Heyford, as German targets were beyond the range of RAF bombers then in service. As a result, Upper Heyford became a base to train newly formed squadrons or for squadrons re-equipping with new aircraft types. Upper Heyford trained bomber crews on Handley Page Hampdens and Vickers Wellingtons, supported by Avro Ansons, switching to de Havilland Mosquitos in 1945.

No. 1 Parachute Training School RAF arrived from RAF Ringway (Manchester Airport) in March 1946, expanding later to include glider training, and moving to RAF Abingdon in 1950. The airfield was used by many units of the Royal Air Force (RAF), mainly as a training facility between 1918 and 1950.

The following units have also been stationed at RAF Upper Heyford at some point (note that units moved out, from March to December 1942, while new runways were laid):

- No. 1 Parachute Training School RAF - 28 March 1946 to 3 December 1947 became No. 1 Parachute and Glider Training School - 3 December 1947 - 10 June 1950
- No. 5 Group Pool RAF - 23 September 1939 - 8 April 1940 became No. 16 Operational Training Unit RAF (night bomber training) - 8 April 1940 to 1 January 1945
- No. 1473 (Special Duties) Flight RAF - 10 July 1942 - 1 December 1942
- No. 1505 (Beam Approach Training) Flight RAF - 20 December 1942 - 3 February 1943
- Detachment of No. 1523 (Beam Approach Training) Flight RAF during January 1942
- No. 2738 Squadron RAF Regiment (airfield defence ground force) - 1942 to TBD
- No. 1655 (Mosquito) Training Unit RAF 30 to 31 December 1944 became (new) No. 16 Operational Training Unit RAF - 1 January 1945 to 1 March 1946
- Experimental Section, Navigation Synthetic Training Development Unit RAF - 1941
- Long Range Development Unit RAF - 1 January 1938 to 23 January 1939
- Transport Command Parachute Servicing Unit RAF - 1 September 1950 - November 1950
- Oxford UAS - 10 January 1928 - 3 November 1932

Squadrons;

- No. 2 Squadron Canadian Air Force (1918-20)
- No. 7 Squadron RAF
- No. 10 Squadron RAF
- No. 33 Squadron RAF
- No. 34 Squadron RAF
- No. 40 Squadron RAF
- No. 58 Squadron RAF
- No. 76 Squadron RAF
- No. 81 Squadron RAF
- No. 89 Squadron RAF
- No. 94 Squadron RAF
- No. 99 Squadron RAF
- No. 105 Squadron RAF
- No. 108 Squadron RAF
- No. 109 Squadron RAF
- No. 113 Squadron RAF
- No. 122 Squadron RAF
- No. 123 Squadron RAF
- No. 157 Squadron RAF
- No. 158 Squadron RAF
- No. 215 Squadron RAF
- No. 218 Squadron RAF
- No. 226 Squadron RAF
- No. 233 Squadron RAF

== United States Air Force use ==
=== 7509th Air Base Group / 3918th Strategic Wing ===
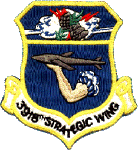

In response to what was perceived as a growing worldwide threat, Strategic Air Command decided to house a strong force of American bomber aircraft in England. It was decided to convert four airfields in and around Oxfordshire to serve as their regular stations. Upper Heyford was one of those selected, the others being RAF Brize Norton, RAF Fairford and RAF Greenham Common.

On 26 June 1950, men of the 801st Engineer Aviation Battalion started work on extending the runway and constructing new hardstands for SAC's larger bombers such as Convair B-36 Peacemaker and Boeing B-50 Superfortress. Days later on 7 July 1950, the first group of United States Air Force personnel arrived to form the 7509th Air Base Squadron, who would act as the host organisation to support the TDY aircraft and personnel detached from their home airfields in the United States of America.

Upper Heyford was formally handed over to the USAF Third Air Force on 15 May 1951, and in January 1952 they relinquished control of the station and turned it over to Strategic Air Command. Over a period of years the 7509th ABS was redesignated a number of times, eventually becoming the 3918th Combat Support Group, until it was inactivated in 1965 when SAC turned control over Upper Heyford to the United States Air Forces in Europe.

=== TDY rotational deployments ===
The first SAC aircraft to be based at Upper Heyford were the 15 Boeing B-50Ds of the 328th Bombardment Squadron, which arrived in December 1951, whilst the other three-squadrons of the 93rd Bombardment Wing were deployed to RAF Lakenheath.

Visiting TDY rotational units at Upper Heyford included: 93rd Bomb Wing, 97th Air Refueling Squadron, 509th Air Refueling Squadron, 301st Bomb Wing, 8th Air Sea Rescue Squadron, 2nd Bomb Wing, 5th Bomb Wing Detachment, and the 22nd Bomb Wing.

By September 1952, Upper Heyford was ready to handle a full complement of 45 aircraft and when the 2nd Bombardment Wing arrived it deployed all three of its bombardment squadrons here with their B-50s. SAC Squadrons and Wings continued to be deployed to the base throughout the 1950s and 60's.

One of the most notable events of 1954 was the arrival of the first of the truly massive Convair RB-36 Peacemakers, a small number of which flew in for a brief stay in June and July by the 5th Strategic Reconnaissance Wing.

Occasional visits by the huge Boeing B-52 Stratofortress commenced at the end of 1960 and became more and more frequent over the next five years. Meanwhile, following nuclear tests behind the 'Iron Curtain' in the summer of 1962, a detachment of Lockheed U-2 reconnaissance aircraft operated from Upper Heyford in August to carry out air sampling and analysis at very high altitudes in order to determine the characteristics of latest Soviet weapons. A third new aircraft type, the Convair B-58 Hustler, was occasionally seen.

Detachment 1, 98th Strategic Wing, supported visiting Boeing KC-135 Stratotanker from the Spanish Tanker Task Force at Torrejon AB Spain and Boeing RC-135 of the 55th Strategic Reconnaissance Wing and 6th Strategic Wing. The 6985th Electronic Security Squadron also maintained a detachment at Upper Heyford, supporting Communications Intelligence Specialists flying on the RC-135s.

In 1964, it was decided that regular detachments of SAC bomber aircraft to England would cease altogether, with the last Operation Reflex alert at Upper Heyford on 1 January 1965. The USAF maintained their presence at RAF Upper Heyford, but RAF Brize Norton, RAF Fairford and RAF Greenham Common were returned to RAF control,

=== 66th Tactical Reconnaissance Wing (1966-70) ===
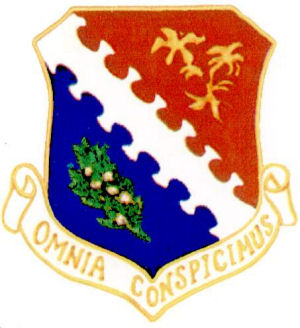

On 7 March 1966, French President Charles De Gaulle announced that France would withdraw from NATO's integrated military structure. The United States was informed that it must remove its military forces from France by 1 April 1967.

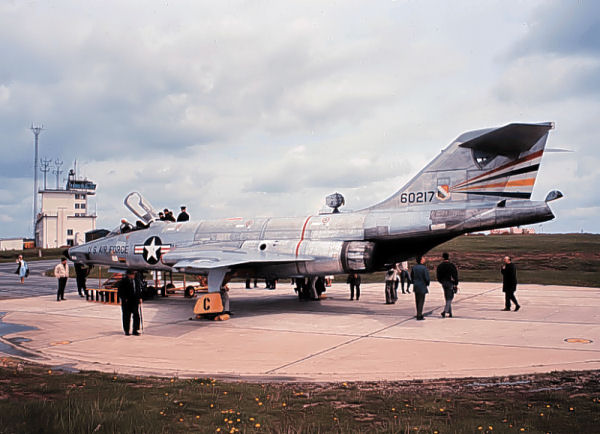
McDonnell RF-101C 56-0217 of the 66th Tactical Reconnaissance Wing, Laon-Couvron AB, France, 1959. These RF-101 aircraft received camouflage after transfer to RAF Upper Heyford

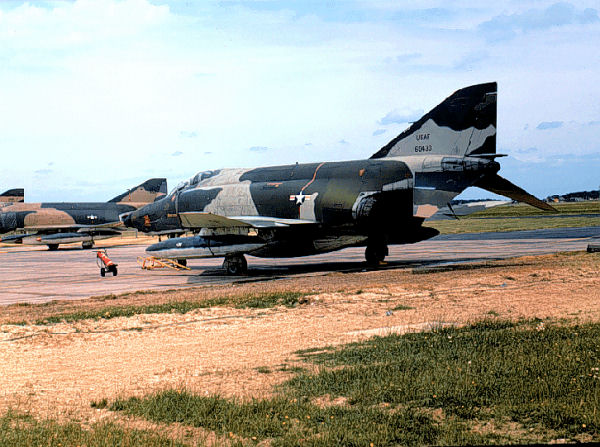
Newly arrived RF-4Cs of the 66th Tactical Recon Wing - September 1969.

Upper Heyford was now to serve as the new and urgently needed base for the McDonnell RF-101 Voodoos of the 66th Tactical Reconnaissance Wing which had been stationed at Laon-Couvron Air Base, France. The 66th TRW was composed of the 17th Tactical Reconnaissance Squadron and 18th Tactical Reconnaissance Squadron who arrived at RAF Upper Heyford with 36 RF-101C Voodoo on 11 September 1966.

The Base Flight (66th Field Maintenance Squadron) also maintained a small number of Douglas C-54 Skymaster, Douglas C-47 Skytrain, and Convair VT-29 Samaritan.

On 27 March 1969, the first two McDonnell Douglas RF-4C Phantom II flew into Upper Heyford. and the 66th became a mixed reconnaissance force. The RF-101C's were assigned to the 18th TRS and were limited to the daylight role. The RF-4C's were assigned to the 17th TRS and were capable of an all weather day and night operation, along with greater range.

The Phantoms were at Upper Heyford for less than a year, as in January 1970 the inactivation of the 66th TRW commenced. The 17th TRS took their newly acquired RF-4Cs to the 86th TFW at Zweibrücken Air Base in Germany, and the 18th TRS (flying RF-101C) joined the 363rd TRW at Shaw Air Force Base, South Carolina. This made space available for the arriving 20th Tactical Fighter Wing.

=== 20th Tactical Fighter Wing (1970-1993) ===
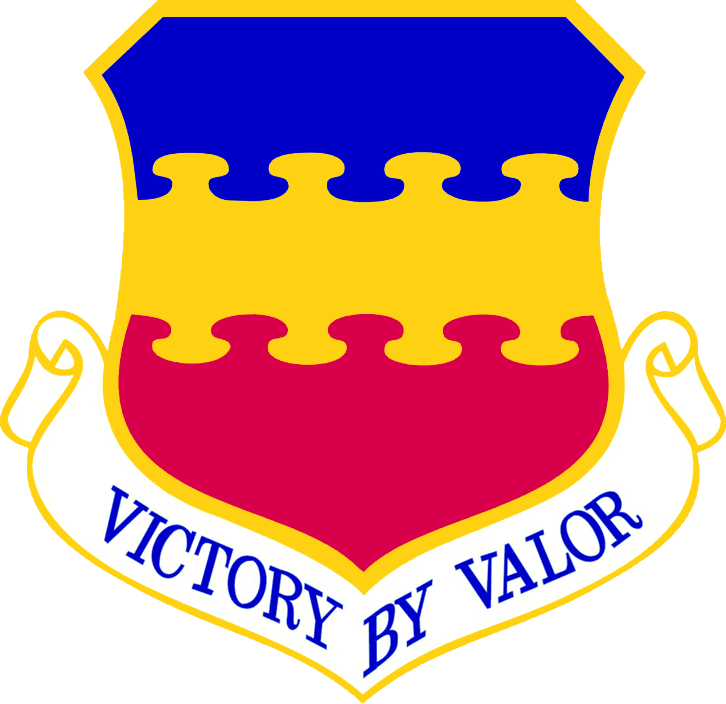

Headquarters, 20th Tactical Fighter Wing relocated from RAF Wethersfield to RAF Upper Heyford on 1 June 1970.

Shortly after arriving at Upper Heyford, the 20th TFW began converting to a new aircraft - the General Dynamics F-111E Aardvark (unofficially). On 12 September 1970 the first two F-111Es arrived at RAF Upper Heyford. The last of the 20th's North American F-100 Super Sabres that it brought from Wethersfield were transferred to the Air National Guard on 12 February 1971. In November 1971, the wing's F-111s were declared operationally ready.

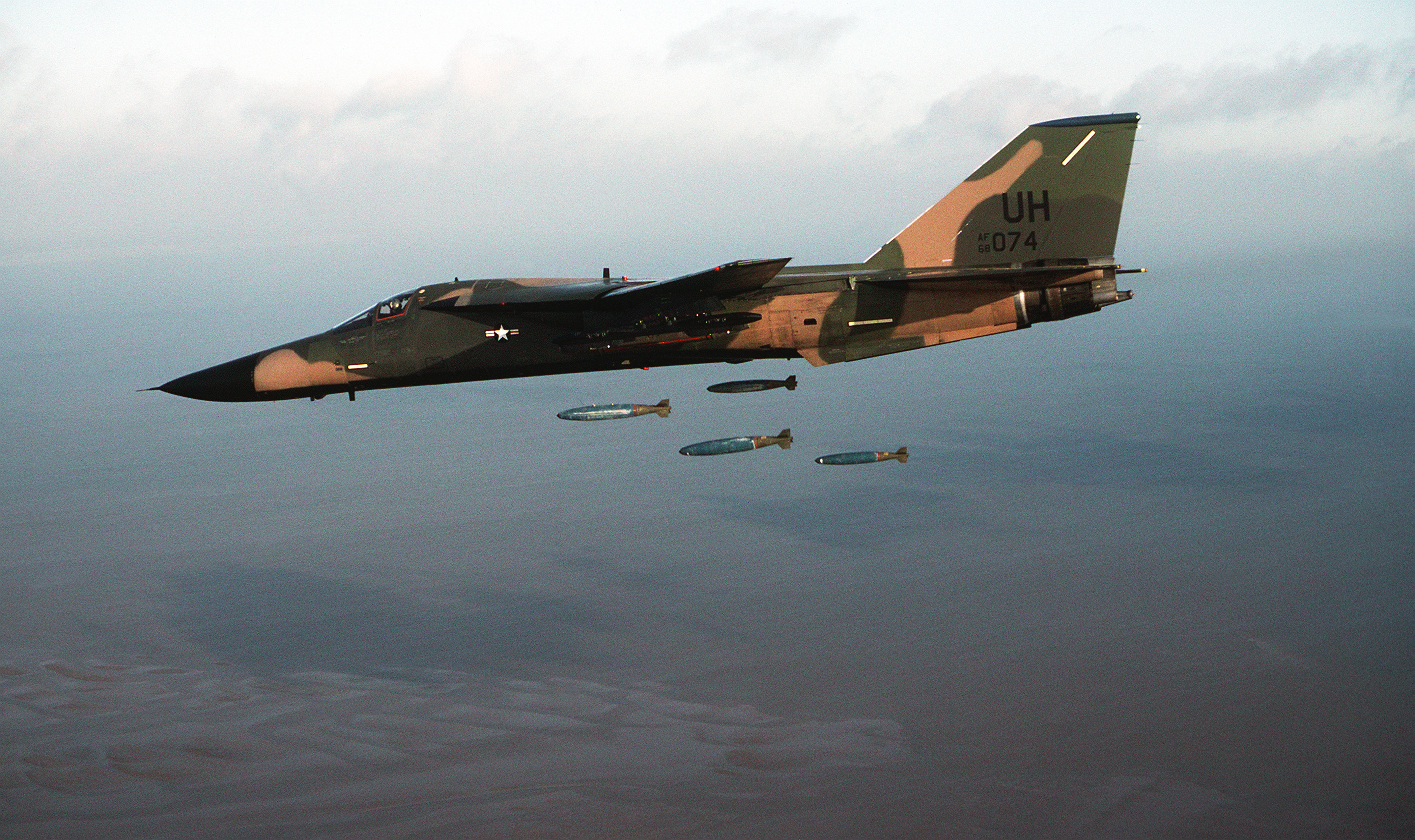
General Dynamics F-111E serial 68-0074 of the 20th Tactical Fighter Wing, RAF Upper Heyford, dropping four bombs on a target range.

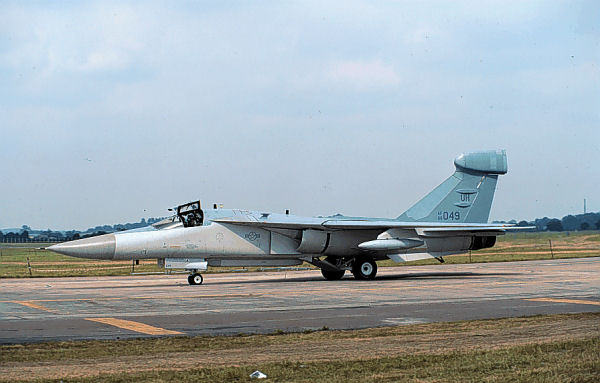
General Dynamics F/EF-111A serial 66-0049 42nd Electronic Countermeasure squadron - 20th Tactical Fighter Wing.

The 20th TFW participated in F-111 NATO and US unilateral operations Shabaz, Display Determination, Cold Fire, Ocean Safari, Datex, Priory, Reforger, Dawn Patrol, Highwood, Hammer, Open Gate (1982 at Ovar Air Base, Portugal) and others from January 1972 to October 1993.

Upper Heyford gained a fourth flying squadron on 1 July 1983, with the activation of the 42nd Electronic Combat Squadron. In February 1984, the first Grumman (General Dynamics) EF-111A Ravens of that squadron arrived.

Parental responsibility over the 42nd by the 20th TFW was short-lived, however, and on 1 June 1985, operational control of the squadron shifted to the 66th Electronic Combat Wing at Sembach Air Base, Germany.

==== Anti-nuclear protests ====
In spring 1982, as tensions between the West and the USSR rose, 12 activists set a peace camp outside the air base. In May 1983 Christian CND organised Peace Pentecost attended by around 2,000 people. In June 1983 there were larger protests culminating when 4,000 people converged as part of a campaign to prevent the expansion of the base. During a blockade, 752 people were arrested.

==== Operation El Dorado Canyon ====
In March 1986, the 66th Electronic Combat Wing detached the 42nd ECS to the 20th TFW to take part in El Dorado Canyon, the raid on Libya.

On 14 April 1986, 5 EF-111As and 20 F-111Es took off from RAF Upper Heyford as part of the attack force. They were used as an airborne reserve for the F-111Fs of the 48th TFW, RAF Lakenheath. Three EF-111s (two were spares and turned back) formed up with the 48th's F-111Fs and provided electronic defense during the attack on Tripoli.

==== Operation Desert Storm ====
On 25 January 1991, during the Gulf War, the wing was once again up to four flying squadrons when the 42nd Electronic Combat Squadron was reassigned to the 20th from the 66th Electronic Combat Wing.

On 17 January 1991, 20th TFW aircraft launched combat missions from both Turkey and Saudi Arabia and continued flying combat missions until the cease fire. The F-111Es flying from Turkey flew night missions throughout the war, using terrain-following radar (TFR) to penetrate the dense anti-aircraft artillery (AAA) environment at altitudes around 200 feet (61 m) for the first few nights.

Crews who flew those first few terrifying nights said that the illumination from the AAA was so bright that they didn't need the TFR to avoid the ground. After the missile threat was suppressed, crews flew their attacks at altitudes around 20,000 feet (6,096 m), above the range of most Iraqi AAA systems.

During the war, the F-111Es attacked a range of targets, including power plants, petroleum refineries, airfields, nuclear-biological-chemical processing and storage facilities, and electronics sites throughout northern Iraq,

When Desert Storm ended, the wing had deployed 458 personnel, flown 1,798 combat sorties without a loss, and dropped 4,714 tons of ordnance.

=== Post Cold War era ===
With the end of the Cold War, the 20th TFW was deemed no longer necessary in the United Kingdom, and the USAF presence at RAF Upper Heyford was gradually phased down.

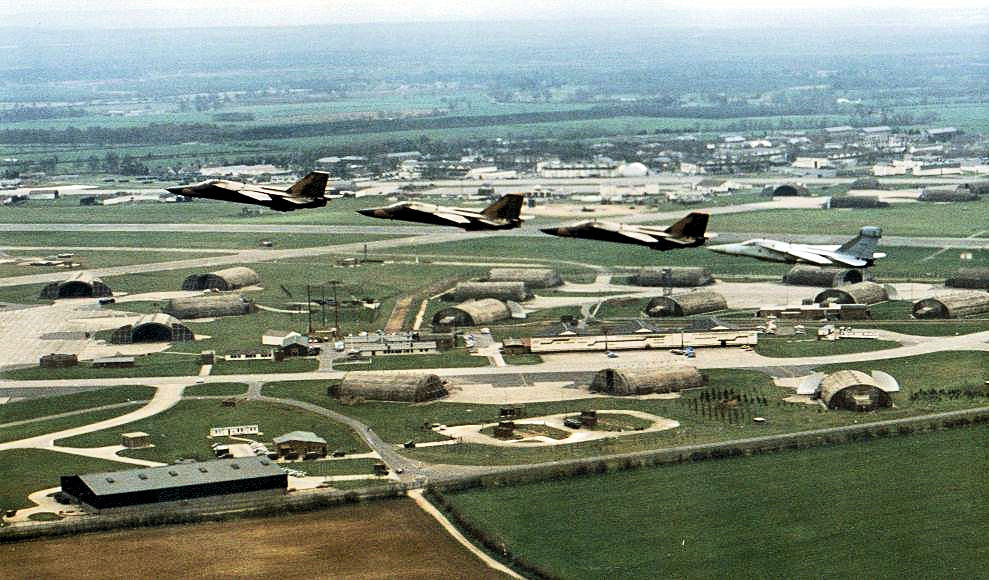
Three F-111Es followed by an EF-111A Raven, representing each of the 20th TFW squadrons, overfly RAF Upper Heyford on their final departure from the base in 1993.

The 20th Tactical Fighter Wing, along with the associated 55th, 77th, and 79th Tactical Fighter Squadrons were officially re-designated the 20th Fighter Wing and 55th, 77th and 79th Fighter Squadrons on 1 October 1991.

On 19 October 1993, aircraft 67-120 went to the Imperial War Museum in Duxford where it is now on display. It retains the 55th Fighter Squadron, 20th Fighter Wing markings it carried when stationed at RAF Upper Heyford. It flew 19 Desert Storm missions and flew into Duxford on 19 October 1993.

The last of the wing's three F-111E aircraft departed from Upper Heyford on 7 December 1993. The flagship of the 55th Fighter Squadron, aircraft 68-055 Heartbreaker, departed first. It went to Robins AFB, Georgia, where it is now on display. The next aircraft, 68-061 The Last Roll of Me Dice, departed for the Aerospace Maintenance and Regeneration Center at Davis Monthan AFB Arizona, in the USA. Finally aircraft 68-020 The Chief, flew to Hill AFB, Utah, where it is now on display at the Hill Aerospace Museum in the USA.

== Closure ==
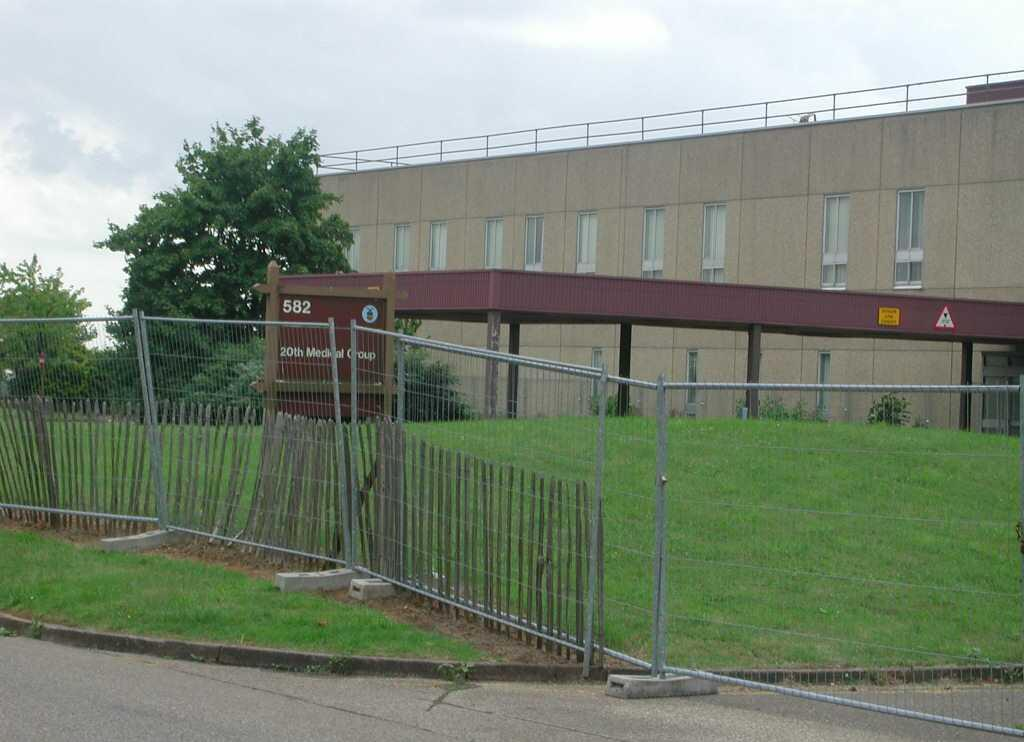
The hospital at Upper Heyford was closed and fenced off in 2001.

On 15 December 1993 the flight line at RAF Upper Heyford was closed. On 1 January 1994 the 20th Fighter Wing at RAF Upper Heyford was transferred without personnel or equipment to Shaw AFB, South Carolina, United States, where it inherited the personnel and General Dynamics F-16 Fighting Falcons of the inactivated 363rd Fighter Wing.

At that time RAF Upper Heyford came under the 620th US Air Base Wing until 30 September 1994, when the U.S. Air Force returned the airfield to the British Ministry of Defence.

The runways are now home to a variety of wildlife including the scarce lowland calcareous grassland and bird species such as peregrine falcon, Eurasian skylark and common buzzard. Some of the buildings are used as an automotive storage compound for new and used vehicles. Other functions include police driving activities such as training. There is a boat builders called Kingsground Narrowboats located at building 103, this building is the oldest on the airfield and used to be the fire department originally, outside the boat-building workshop there are still parking spaces road marked as "FD". The majority of the residential buildings are now let out as rented accommodation and some of the shops and services have been re-opened to service the community.

There are however many buildings which are still boarded up and it is currently unclear what the future of those will be. It seems that many of the buildings such as the hospital have been targeted by vandals who have smashed glass and walls in as well as internal fittings. Graffiti has also occurred, as well as the whole hospital suffering from damage from leaking rainwater that has subsequently caused extensive mould, damp floors and a flooded cellar. The building, however has now been secured as it is rumoured to be sold. The disused buildings have also become popular with local urban explorers.

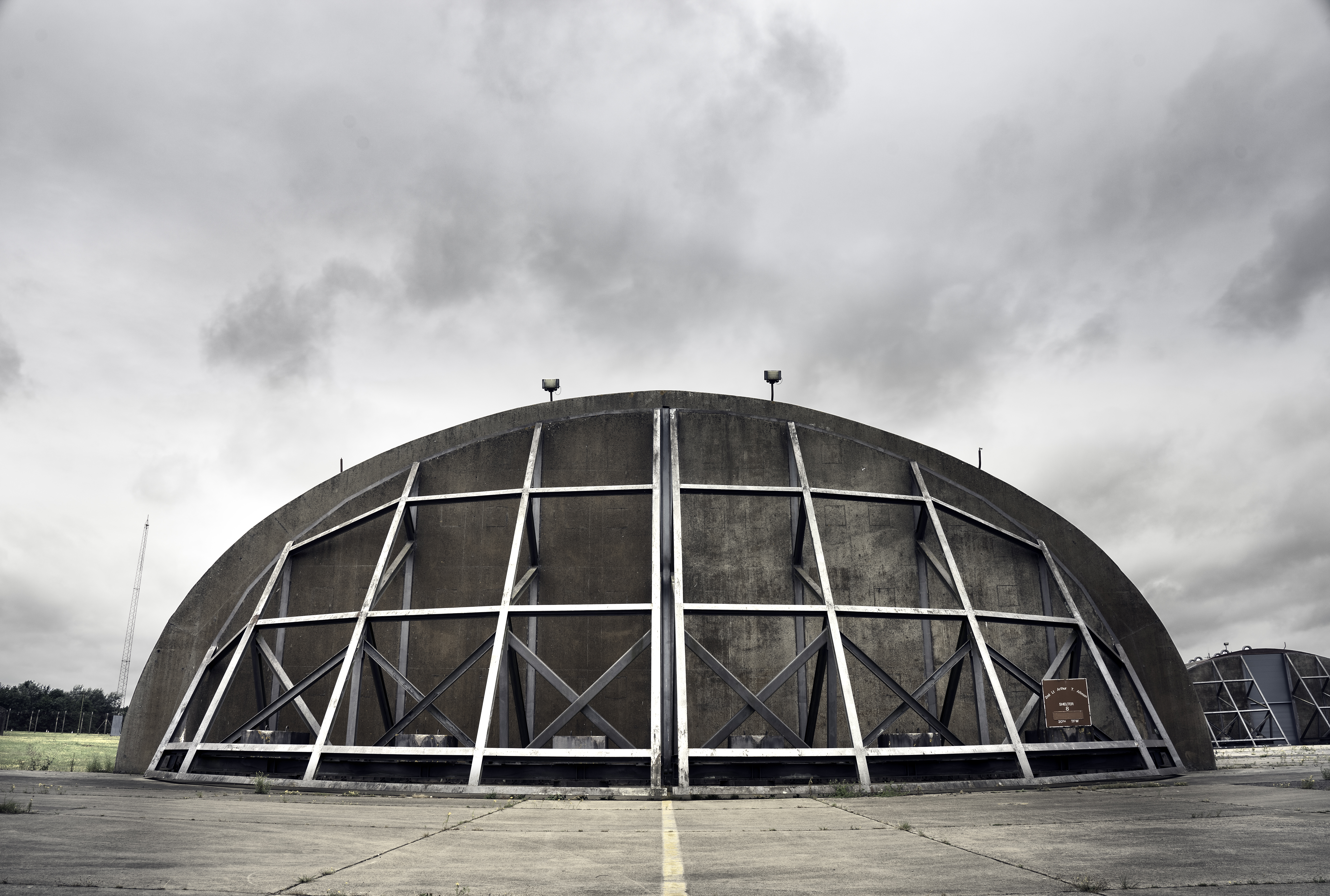
One of the hardened aircraft shelters at RAF Upper Heyford

Several of the hardened aircraft shelters were placed on the English Heritage list of scheduled monuments in 2010. A bid was made in 2011 for the site to receive World Heritage Site status but it did not make the UK shortlist.

In May 2012, the residential section was leased to First And Only Airsoft for a short period of use as an airsoft site. This lease ended in January 2013.

In April 2020, Oxfordshire County Council confirmed reports that several of the hangars had been temporary converted into mortuaries as a contingency during the COVID-19 pandemic.

== Dorchester Group ownership ==
In 2009 Dorchester Group acquired Heyford Park from previous owners The North Oxfordshire Consortium, with plans to redevelop the former airfield into more than 1000 new homes alongside a new employment hub.

In 2013 construction work commenced for the first new homes and Heyford Park Free School opened. The school is an all-through school for children aged 3–19 and is located in the refurbished Officer’s Mess and Specialisms Campus (the former USAF gym).

In 2018 Dorchester Group submitted a new Masterplan application to Cherwell District Council to create 1600 additional homes as well as an employment hub for creative industries.

In 2019 the newly refurbished Heritage Centre was opened by Dorchester Group displaying a range of items from the site’s history and running guided tours of the airfield, including giving access into some of the historic buildings.

As of July 2020, there were c.2,000 residents living at Heyford Park. In September 2024, Dorchester Living announced a scheme for a new town of 6,000 homes on the site, together with employment and leisure opportunities.

== See also ==
- List of former Royal Air Force stations
- United States Air Forces in Europe
- United States Air Force in the United Kingdom
- Strategic Air Command in the United Kingdom
