= Strategic Air Command wings =

The United States Air Force's Strategic Air Command maintained many different types of wing in its forty-six years of history.

- See:List of ANG wings assigned to Strategic Air Command
- See:List of USAF Bomb Wings and Wings assigned to Strategic Air Command
- See:List of USAF Fighter Wings assigned to Strategic Air Command
- See:List of USAF Provisional Wings assigned to Strategic Air Command
- See:List of USAF Reconnaissance wings assigned to Strategic Air Command
- See:List of USAF Strategic Wings assigned to the Strategic Air Command

== See also ==
- List of Wings of the United States Air Force
- List of MAJCOM Wings of the United States Air Force
