= List of USAF Provisional Wings assigned to Strategic Air Command =

Provisional Wings were United States Air Force Strategic Air Command wings that were established on paper to allow other Wings to provide support, both aircraft and personnel, at temporary locations outside the continental United States for periods of time such as during the Gulf War.

Provisional wings were created to provide air support to whatever operation was going on at the time. Real wings in the continental United States ('stateside') would supply aircraft and individuals to the provisional wing on a Temporary Duty (TDY) basis, with the aircraft and personnel returned to their home unit after the TDY period was over.

The United States Air Force's Provisional Wings included several Strategic Wings created to support Strategic Air Command operations during the Gulf War of 1990–91.

== Practice during Vietnam War ==
During the Vietnam War, starting in 1965, SAC would deploy over two complete Bombardment Wings including Bombardment Squadrons, Air Refueling Squadrons, including the Maintenance & Support Squadrons and their personnel to Andersen AFB, Guam (B-52 Bomber and a few supporting tanker aircraft), Kadena AB, Okinawa, (B-52 Bomber & the Primary Tanker Aircraft Base) & Kung Kuan (Later renamed:) / Ching Chuan Kang Air Base, Taiwan (A forward base for Tanker Operations) leaving a small caretaker force at the home base. The deployments were called Arc Light deployments.

The first units deployed flew B-52F models that could carry 27 internal 500 lb bombs and 24 external 500 or 750 lb bombs for a total of 51 bombs, These were later replaced with the B-52D as they completed the Conventional Stores and weapons release modifications referred to as the "Big Belly" Modification. The "Big Belly aircraft were modified that 3 Internal Conventional Weapons Racks could be carried & released, increasing the weapons capability of 108 internal & external 500 lb bombs, depending on the targets requirements a mixture of 750 & 500 lb bombs were also carried, but there were too many configurations to list. The mission was considered so important that the wing on Guam at the time had to be manned 110% aircraft and personnel. Since no stateside wing was ever manned to 100% of its personnel, SAC HQ drew upon other stateside wings to send their personnel to augment the wing on Guam. A third B-52 base was added in 1966 at U-Tapao Royal Thai Naval Airfield, Thailand, using rotational aircraft and aircrews from Andersen AFB and Kadena AB. B-52's were withdrawn from Kadena in Sep 1970; and Andersen AFB reduced B-52 Operations to Maintenance and Alert Operations. The B-52D force were moved PCS to U-Tapao and the crew force was now shared by all Stateside B-52 Units (B-52G/H crews were required to attend a B-52D crew Replacement Training Course at Castle AFB, while en route to Thailand. This was standard operations until Jan 1972 when Linebacker I began and Guam became active in B-52 Combat Operations.

When the primary wing on Guam came home, another wing was sent, with the second wing deploying about 14 days later, and because they were not at 100% some personnel might be tapped to augment that wing for another 179 days Temporary Duty. The 179 days was critical because any stay on excess of 179 days was considered a Permanent Change of Station. This policy at times was waivered with the approval of the Secretary of Defence mostly in 1972 with the requirement the PCS assignment would not be issued.

B-52F Wings Deployed

2nd Bombardment Wing (H) Barksdale AFB, LA.(Deployed under Project "Air Mail" B52 Deployed Alert Force); Feb 65 – Apr 65.

320th Bombardment Wing (H) Mather AFB, CA. Feb 65 – Jul 65; Dec 65 – Mar 66

7th Bombardment Wing (H) Carswell AFB, TX. 13 Apr 65 – 1 Dec 65

454th Bombardment Wing (H) Columbus AFB, MS. 16 Nov 65 – 31 Mar 66

The First Combat Mission was flown on 18 Jun 65 by the 7th & 320th BW's

B-52D Wings Deployed 22nd Bombardment Wing (H) March AFB, CA. 10 Mar 67 – 1 Oct 67

28th Bombardment Wing (H) Ellsworth AFB, SD. 15 Jan 68 – 19 Jul 68

70th Bombardment Wing (H) Clinton – Sherman AFB, OK. 1 Feb 68 – Sep 68

91st Bombardment Wing (H) Glasgow AFB, MT. 11 Sep 66 – 31 Mar 67

92nd Bombardment Wing (H) Fairchild AFB, WA. Mar 68 – Sep 68; Mar 69 – Sep 69

96th Bombardment Wing (H) Dyess AFB, TX. 22 Jun 70 – 19 Sep 70

99th Bombardment Wing (H) Westover AFB, MA.1 Oct 67 – 1 Apr 68; 22 Sep 68 – 21 Mar 69; 15 Mar 70 – 22 Jun 70.

306th Bombardment Wing (H) McCoy AFB, FL. 6 Sep 66 – Apr 67; Sep 68 – Apr 69; Oct 69 – Apr 70

454th Bombardment Wing (H) Columbus AFB, MS. 27 Jun 67 – 23 Dec 67; 28 Jun 68 – 20 Dec 68

461st Bombardment Wing (H) Amarillo AFB, TX. 17 Jan 67 – 4 Jul 67

484th Bombardment Wing (H) Turner AFB, GA. 1 Apr 66 – 29 Sep 68

509th Bombardment Wing (H) Pease AFB, NH. 1 Apr 68 – 1 Oct 68

== Strategic Wing, Provisional,72 ==
- Established: 1 June 1972.
- Equipment 100 B-52G's
- At: Andersen AFB, Guam.
- Assigned to the Air Division, Provisional,57
- Assigned Squadrons
- Bombardment Squadron, Provisional, 64
- Bombardment Squadron, Provisional, 65
- Bombardment Squadron, Provisional,329
- Bombardment Squadron, Provisional,486
- Discontinued on: 15 November 1973.

Established as the Strategic Wing, Provisional,72 on 1 June 1972 at Andersen AFB, Guam. The SW, P 72 flew 8,010 sorties over Cambodia and flew the last U.S. sorties of the Vietnam War on 15 August 1973.

== Consolidated Aircraft Maintenance Wing, Provisional,303 ==
- Established: 1 June 1972.
- Maintain all Guam Based B-52D/B52G and all Transit/Alert KC-135 Aircraft
- At: Andersen AFB, Guam.
- Assigned to the Air Division, Provisional,57
- Assigned Squadrons
- 3rd Munitions Maintenance Squadron (Until: 1 Oct 1972)
- 2nd Avionics Maintenance Squadron
- 43rd Avionics Maintenance Squadron
- 43rd Field Maintenance Squadron
- 43rd Munitions Maintenance Squadron (After: 1 Oct 1972)
- 43rd Organizational Maintenance Squadron
- Discontinued on: 15 November 1973.

== Strategic Wing, Provisional,310 ==
- Established: 1 June 1972.
- Equipment All Thailand Based "Young Tiger" KC-135A Aircraft
- At: Andersen AFB, Guam.
- Assigned to the Air Division, Provisional,17
- Assigned Squadrons
- Air Refueling Squadron, Provisional, 901 (U-Tapao)
- Air Refueling Squadron, Provisional, 902 (U-Tapao)
- Air Refueling Squadron, Provisional, 4101 (Takhli)
- Air Refueling Squadron, Provisional, 4103 (Don Maung / Bangkok IAP)
- Air Refueling Squadron, Provisional, 4104 (Korat)
- Discontinued on: 1 Jul 1974.

== Consolidated Aircraft Maintenance Wing, Provisional,340 ==
The wing was Established on 1 June 1972, and maintained all U-Tapao RTAFB Based B-52D/ KC-135 Aircraft It was assigned to the Air Division, Provisional, 17.

- Assigned Squadrons:
  - 307th Avionics Maintenance Squadron
  - 307th Field Maintenance Squadron
  - 307th Munitions Maintenance Squadron
  - 307th Organizational Maintenance Squadron

It was discontinued on: 1 Jul 1974. Reference:

== 801st Air Refueling Wing (P) Provisional ==
- Date: 19 December 1990
- At: Moron AB, Spain
  - Equipment: KC-135s
  - From 2nd Bomb Wing, Barksdale AFB, LA

== 801st Bomb Wing (P) Provisional ==
- Date: 16 January 1991
- At: Moron AB, Spain
  - Equipment: B-52Gs (6)
  - From: 2nd Bomb Wing, Barksdale AFB, LA
- Date: 17 January 1991
  - Equipment: B-52Gs (3)
  - From: 416th Bomb Wing, Griffiss AFB, NY
- Date 19 January 1991
  - Equipment: B-52Gs (10)
  - From: 379th Bomb Wing, Wurtsmith AFB, MI

== 806th Bomb Wing (P) Provisional ==
- Date: 5 February 1991
- At: RAF Fairford, England (Attached to 7th Air Division).
  - Equipment: B-52Gs
  - From: 2d Bomb Wing, Barksdale AFB, LA, 379th Bomb Wing, Wurtsmith AFB, MI, 416th Bomb Wing, Griffiss AFB, NY, 97th Bomb Wing, Eaker AFB, AR

42 MMS, Loring AFB, Maine

== 802nd Air Refueling Wing (P) Provisional ==
- Date: 19 December 1990
- At: Lajes AB, Lisbon, Portugal (Attached to 7th Air Division).
  - Equipment: KC-135s (from 97 BW Eaker AFB, 2 BW Barksdale AFB, 92 BW Fairchild AFB, 7 BW Carlswell AFB), KC-10s (from 2 BW Barksdale AFB)

== 804th Air Refueling Wing (P) Provisional ==
- Date: 21 December 1990
- At: Incirlik, Turkey (Attached to 7th Air Division).
  - Equipment: KC-135s

== 1500th Strategic Wing (P) Provisional ==
- Date: 1 October 1990
- At: Anderson AFB, Guam
  - Equipment: B-52Gs

== 1700th Strategic Wing (P) Provisional ==
- Date: 11 August 1990
- At: Riyadh, Saudi Arabia
  - Equipment: RC-135s (4), TR-1s, U-2.
  - From: 55th Strategic Reconnaissance Wing, Offutt AFB, NE
  - From: 9th Strategic Reconnaissance Wing, Beale AFB, Ca.
  - JIPC: Joint Intelligence Production Complex
- Date: 12 August 1990
  - Equipment: B-52Gs (7)
  - From: 69th Bomb Squadron, 42nd Bomb Wing, Loring AFB, ME

== 1701st Strategic Wing (P) Provisional ==
- Date: 14 August 1990
- At: Jeddah, Saudi Arabia
  - Equipment: KC-135s, KC-10s & B-52s.
  - From: See 1708th Bomb Wing (Provisional) and 1709th Air Refueling Wing (Provisional).

== 1701st Air Refueling Wing (P) Provisional ==
- Date: 11 August 1990
- At: Jeddah, Saudi Arabia
  - Equipment: KC-135Es (16)
  - From: 117th Air Refueling Squadron, 190th Air Refueling Group, Forbes ANGB, KS, 452 Air Refueling Wing March AFB CA
- Date:6 September 1990
  - Equipment: KC-135Rs(2)
  - From: 19th Air Refueling Wing, Robbins AFB, GA.
- Date: 24 September 1990
  - Equipment:: KC-10As (2)
  - From: 68th Air Refueling Wing, Seymour Johnson AFB, NC
- Date: 12 October 1990
  - From: 157th Air Refueling Wing, Pease AFB, NH.
  - Equipment: KC-135E (1)
- Date: 31 December 1990
  - Equipment: KC-135Es (3)
  - From: 68th Air Refueling Wing, Seymour Johnson AFB, NC.
- Date: 1 January 1991
  - Equipment: KC-135Es (3)
  - From: 145th Air Refueling Squadron, 160th Air Refueling Group, Rickenbacker ANGB, OH.
- Date: 3 January 1991
  - Equipment: KC-135Es (10)
  - From: 108th Air Refueling Squadron, 126th Air Refueling Wing, O’Hare ANGB, IL.
  - Equipment: KC-135Es (10),
  - From: 117th Air Refueling Squadron, 190th Air Refueling Group, Forbes ANGB, KS.
  - Equipment: KC-135Es (8)
  - From: 171st Air Refueling Wing, Pittsburgh ANGB, PA.
  - Equipment: KC135Es (3)
  - From: 134th Air Refueling Group, McGhee Tyson ANGB, TN
- Date: 4 January 1991
  - Equipment: KC-135Es (3)
  - From: 145th Air Refueling Squadron, 160th Air Refueling Group, Rickenbacker ANGB, OH

Date: 5 January 1991

  - Equipment KC-135Es (2)
  - From: 336th Air Refueling Squadron, 452nd Air Refueling Wing, March AFB, CA., (Aircraft Only)
  - Equipment: KC-135Es (4)
  - From: 72nd Air Refueling Squadron,434th Air Refueling Wing, Grissom AFB, IN.
- Date: 6 January 1991
  - Equipment: KC-135Es (4)
  - From: 336th Air Refueling Squadron, 452nd Air Refueling Wing, March AFB, CA., (Aircraft Only)
- Date:13 January 1991
  - Equipment: KC-10As (8)
  - From: 68th Air Refueling Wing, Seymour Johnson AFB, NC
- Date:15 January 1991
  - Equipment:KC-10As (3)
  - From:22nd Air Refueling Wing, March AFB, CA.
- Date: 16 January 1991
  - Equipment: KC-135Es (4)
  - From: 101st Air Refueling Wing, Bangor ANGB, ME
  - Equipment: B-52Gs (6)
  - From: Anderson AFB, Guam

== 1702nd Air Refueling Wing (P) Provisional ==
- Date: 28 Aug 1990
- At: Seeb, Oman.
  - Equipment: KC-135Rs(1).
  - From: 41st Air Refueling Squadron, 416th Bomb Wing, Griffiss AFB, NY
  - Equipment: KC-135R(1)
  - From: 301st Air Refueling Squadron, 301st Air Refueling Wing, Malstrom AFB, MT.
- Date: 29 Aug 1990
  - Equipment: KC-135Rs(3)
  - From: 905th Air Refueling Squadron, 319th Bomb Wing. Grand Forks AFB, ND.
- Date: Aug 1990 (specific date needs confirmed)
  - Equipment: KC-10A(6)
  - From: 2nd Air Refueling Squadron, 2nd Bomb Wing, Barksdale AFB, LA.
- Date: 23 September 1990

== 1703rd Air Refueling Wing (P) Provisional ==
- Date: 13 August 1990
- At: King Khalid, Saudi Arabia
  - Equipment: KC-135Rs (10)
  - From: 306th and 11th Air Refueling Squadrons, 340th Air Refueling Wing, Altus AFB, OK
  - Equipment: B-52Gs (7)
  - From: 69th Bomb Squadron, 42nd Bomb Wing, Loring AFB, ME.
  - Equipment:KC-135Rs (10)
  - From: 305th and 70th Air Refueling Squadrons, 305th Air Refueling Wing, Grissom AFB, IN.
- Date: 14 October 1990
  - Equipment: KC-135Qs (3)
  - From: 380th Bomb Wing, Plattsburgh AFB, NY
- Date: 21 October 1990
  - Equipment: KC-135As (3)
  - From:310th and 380th Air Refueling Squadrons, 380th Bomb Wing, Plattsburgh AFB, NY (Now Closed)
  - Equipment: KC-135As (3)
  - From: 379th Air Refueling Squadron, 379th Bomb Wing, Wurtsmith AFB, MI.
  - Equipment: KC-135As (3)
  - From: 410th Air Refueling Squadron, 410th Bomb Wing, K. I. Sawyer AFB, MI
- Date: 28 October 1990
  - Equipment: KC-135As (3)
  - From: 410th Air Refueling Squadron, 410th Bomb Wing, K. I. Sawyer AFB, MI.
- Date 27 December 1990
  - Equipment: KC-135As(3)
  - From:905th Air Rerfueling Squadron, 319th Bomb Wing, Grand Forks AFB, ND.
  - Deployed Forward from 1706 Air Refueling Wing
- Date 31 December 1990
  - Equipment: KC-135As (UNK) and KC-135Rs (UNK)
  - From: 28th Air Rerfueling Squadron, 28th Bomb Wing, Ellsworth AFB, SD.
- Date January–February 1991
  - Equipment: EC-135s (UNK)
  - From: 4th Air Command and Control Squadron, 28th Bomb Wing, Ellsworth AFB, SD.

== 1706th Air Refueling Wing (P) Provisional ==
- Date: 28 September 1990
- At: Cario West, Egypt
  - Equipment: KC-155Rs(3)
  - From:905th Air Rerfueling Squadron, 319th Bomb Wing, Grand Forks AFB, ND.
- Date:9 October 1990
  - Equipment:KC-135R
  - From:9th Strategic Reconnaissance Wing, Beale AFB< CA.
- Date: 30 December 1990
  - Equipment: KC-135Es (10)
  - From: 126th Air Refueling Squadron, 128th Air Refueling Group, Gen. Mitchell ANGB, WI
- Date: 31 December 1990
  - Equipment: KC-135Es (5)
  - From: 116th Air Refueling Squadron, 141st Air Refueling Wing, Fairchild AFB, WA

== 1708th Bomb Wing (P) Provisional ==
- Date: 14 August 1990
- At: Jeddah, Saudi Arabia
  - Equipment: B-52Gs(18)
  - From: 524th Bomb Squadron, 379th Bomb Wing, Wurtsmith AFB, MI; 69th and 328th Bomb Squadrons, 42nd Bomb Wing, Loring AFB, ME.
- Date: 21 December 1990
  - Equipment: B-52Gs
  - From: 379th Bomb Wing, Wurtsmith AFB, MI; 2nd Bomb Wing, Barksdale AFB, LA; 42nd Bomb Wing, Loring AFB, ME; 93rd Bomb Wing, Castle AFB, CA; 416th Bomb Wing, Griffiss AFB, NY

== 1709th Air Refueling Wing (P) Provisional ==
- Date: 19 December 1990
- At: Jeddah, Saudi Arabia
  - Equipment: KC-135s (100) and KC-10s (30)

== 1712th Air Refueling Wing (P) Provisional ==
- Date: 19 December 1990
- At: Abu Dhabi, United Arab Emirates
  - Equipment: KC'-135Es

== 1713th Air Refueling Wing (Provisional) ==
The wing was formed on 19 December 1990 at Dubai, United Arab Emirates. It was equipped with KC-135Es. The aircraft and crew were provided by the 134th Air Refueling Wing, McGee Tyson ANGB, TN; 171st Air Refueling Wing, Pittsburgh ANG Base, PA; & 121st Air Refueling Wing, Rickenbacker ANG Base, Columbus, OH. It was commanded by Colonel Frederick H. Forster of the 134th ARW.

== Bombardment Wing (Provisional), 4133 ==
- Activated on: 1 February 1966.
- At: Andersen AFB, Guam.
- Assigned: 3rd Air Division
- Assigned to: Strategic Air Command, (attached to 3rd Air Division from 1 February 1966 to 1 April 1970.
- Equipment: ARC LIGHT Deployed B-52s.
- Inactivated on: 1 July 1970.

== 4300th Bomb Wing (P) (Provisional) ==
- Date: 13 August 1990
- At: Diego Garcia, Indian Ocean
- Equipment: B-52Gs (22)
- From: 42nd Bomb Wing, Loring AFB, ME, 92nd Bomb Wing, Fairchild AFB WA,93rd Bomb Wing Castle AFB CA, 416th Bomb Wing, Griffis AFB, Rome, NY, and 7th Bomb Wing, Carswell AFB, Ft. Worth, TX.

== See also ==
- List of MAJCOM Wings of the United States Air Force
