= List of USAF Reconnaissance wings assigned to Strategic Air Command =

This is a list of United States Air Force Strategic Reconnaissance Wings assigned to Strategic Air Command (SAC) from 1946 to 1992 when SAC was disestablished. At the bottom of the list is a gallery of images of example mission equipment used by these Wings.

Note: Due to the United States Air Force common practice of redesignating units, bases and equipment, links that you will find in this list may take you to an article with different headings than you might expect. If you continue to read through that article, you will find the subject linked from.

Reconnaissance Wings Assigned to Strategic Air Command
Strategic Reconnaissance Wing Designation	Activated or Redesignated	Base Assigned	Mission Equipment	Redesignated or Inactivated	New Designation
5th SRW	Constituted (1 Jul 1949)	Mountain Home AFB (1 Jul 1949); Fairfield-Suisun AFB (Nov 1949)	RB-17G; F-2; F-9; F-13; RB-29; RB-36D	Oct 1955	Redesignated as 5th Bomb Wing
6th SRW	Redesignated (25 Mar 1967); as 6th Strategic Wing: Redesignated (1 Apr 1988); as 6th SRW	Eilson AFB (1965)	KC-135; RC-135; TC-135	1 Sep 1992	(Inactivated)
9th SRW	Redesignated (25 Jun 1966); as 9th SRW: Redesignated (1 Sep 1991); as 9th Wing: Redesignated (1 Oct 1993); as 9th Strategic Wing	Beale AFB (25 Jun 1966)	SR-71; U-2; TR-1; KC-135; T-38; MC-12		(Still Operational)
26th SRW	Constituted (9 May 1952); Activated (28 May 1952)	Lockbourne AFB	RB-47; KC-97	1 Jul 1958	(Inactivated)
28th SRW	Redesignated (1 Apr 1950); as 28th SRW: Redesignated (16 Jul 1950); as 28th SRW, Heavy	Rapid City AFB	RB-29; RB-36D; GRB-36D	1 Oct 1955	Redesignated as 28th Bomb Wing, Heavy
55th SRW	Redesignated (27 Oct 1950); as 55th SRW, Medium: Activated (1 Nov 1950); Redesignated (1 Sep 1991); as 55th Wing	Ramey AFB (1 Nov 1950); Forbes AFB (5 Oct 1952); Offutt AFB (16 Aug 1966)	RB-29; RB-50; RB-47E; KC-97; E-4A; E-4B; C-135; EC-135; KC-135; RC-135; NKC-135; OC-135; TC-135; WC-135; EC-130; T-38; SM-65		(Still Operational)
68th SRW, Medium	Constituted (4 Oct 1951); Activated (10 Oct 1951)	Lake Charles AFB (Oct 10, 1951)	RB-29; KC-97	16 Jun 1952	Redesignated as 68th Bomb Wing, Medium
70th SRW	Established (23 Mar 1953); Activated (14 Jan 1955)	Lockbourne AFB (23 Mar 1953); Little Rock AFB (19 Oct 1955)	RB-47E; KC-97	25 Oct 1961	(Inactivated)
71st SRW, Fighter	Redesignated (4 Nov 1954); as 71st SRW, Fighter: Activated (24 Jan 1955)	Larson AFB	GRB-36; RF-84K (GRF-84); RF-84F	1 Jul 1957	(Inactivated)
72d SRW, Heavy	Constituted (4 Jun 1952); Activated (16 Jun 1952)	Ramey AFB	RB-36	1 Oct 1955	Redesignated as 72d Bomb Wing, Heavy
90th SRW, Medium	Redesignated (16 Jun 1952) as 90th SRW, Medium	Forbes AFB	RB-29; RB-47; KB-29; KC-97	20 Jun 1960	(Inactivated)
91st SRW	Constituted (11 Oct 1948); Activated (10 Nov 1948); Redesignated (6 Jul 1950); as 91st SRW, Medium	McGuire AFB (11 Oct 1948); Barksdale AFB (1 Oct 1949); Lockbourne AFB (11 Sep 1951)	RB-29J; KB-29; KC-97; RB-45C; YRB-47; B-17G; B-50; RB-47E	8 Nov 1957	(Inactivated)
99th SRW, Heavy	Activated (1 Jan 1953)	Fairchild AFB (1 Jan 1953)	RB-36; GRB-36D	1 Oct 1955	Redesignated as 99th Bomb Wing, Heavy
100th SRW	Redesignated (25 Jun 1966) as 100th SRW	Davis-Monthan AFB	U-2; BQM-34; WB-57	30 Sep 1976	Redesignated as 100th Air Refueling Wing, Heavy
4080th SRW	Designated (1 May 1956); as 4080th SRW, Light: Redesignated (15 Jun 1960); as 4080th Strategic Wing	Turner AFB (1 May 1956)	U-2; RB-57D	25 Jun 1966	(Discontinued)
4200th SRW	Constituted (Dec 1964); Activated (1 Jan 1965)	Beale AFB (1 Jan 1965)	T-38; SR-71	25 Jun 1966	(Discontinued)

== Mission Equipment ==
The following gallery shows one example of each type of aircraft used by these reconnaissance wings as Mission Equipment.

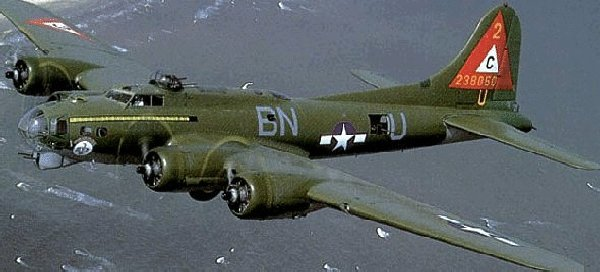
B-17G

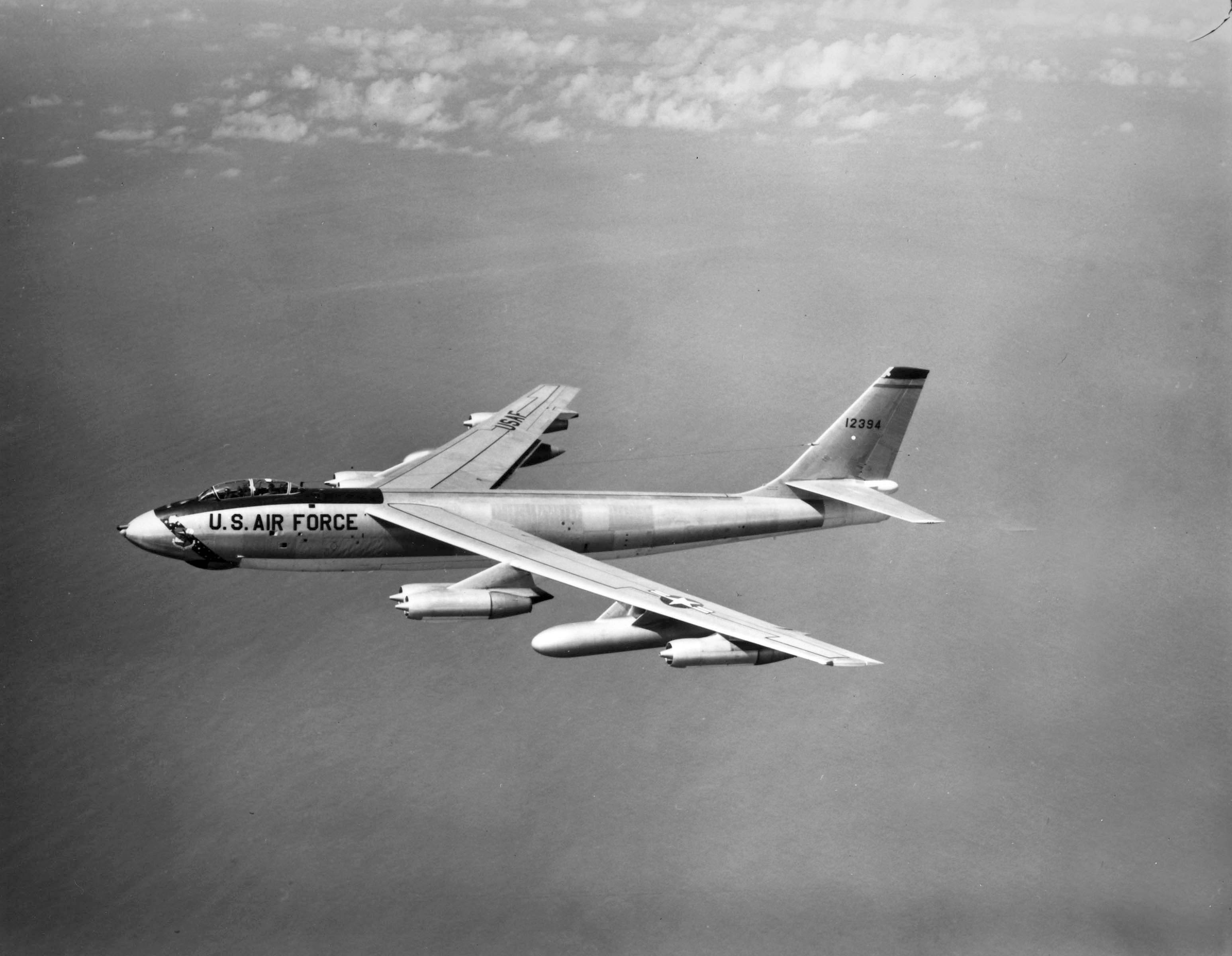
B-47

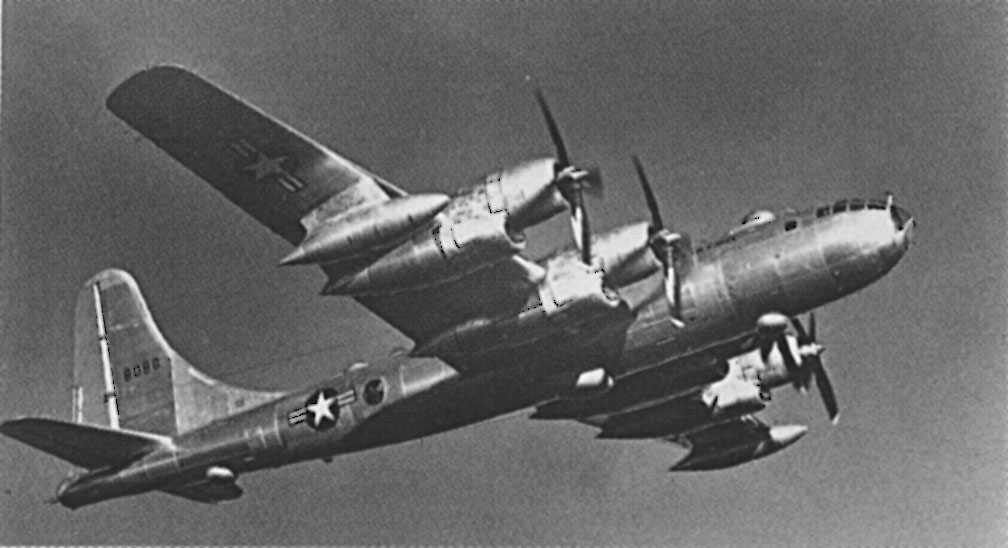
B-50

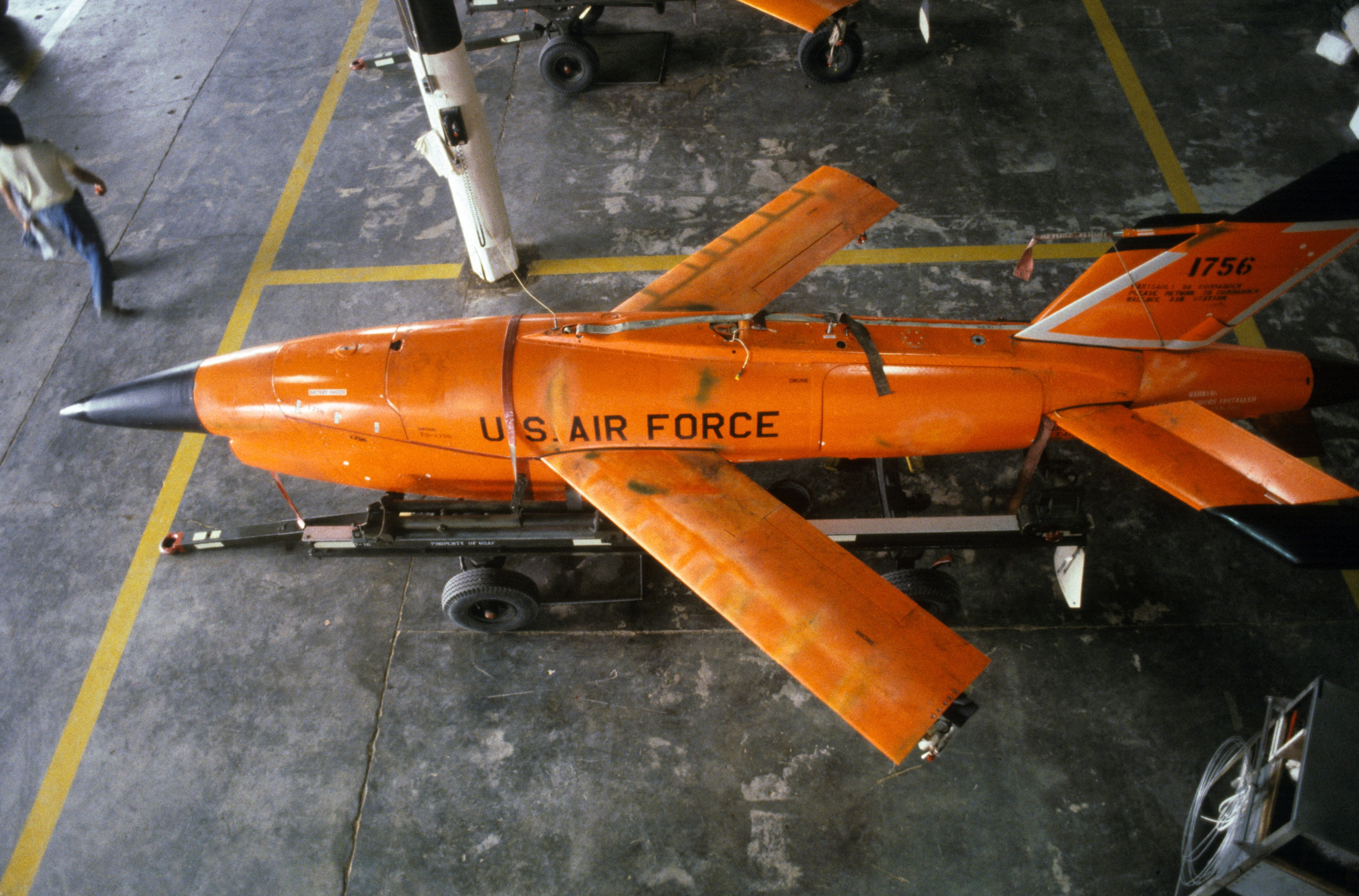
BQM-34

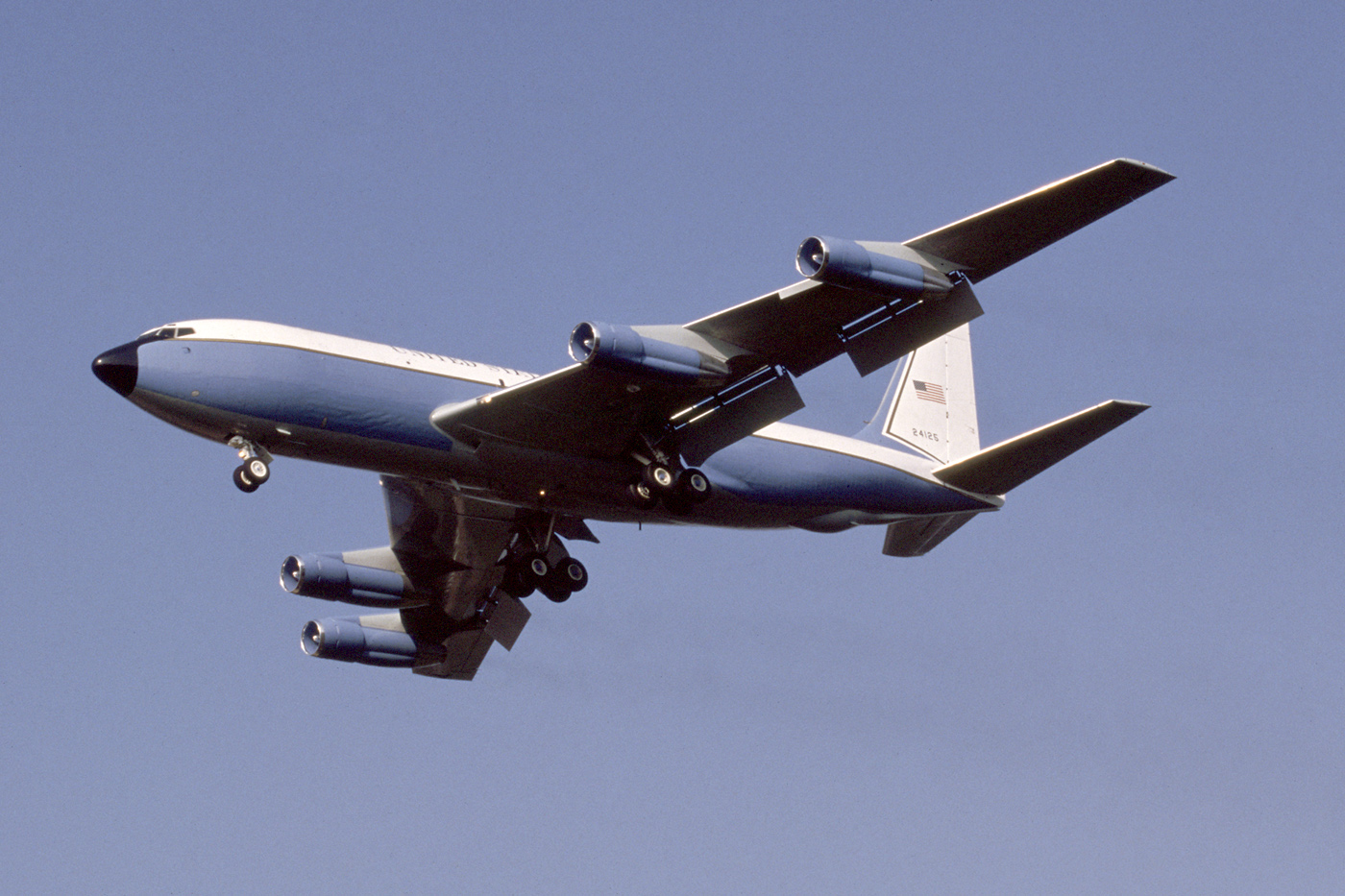
C-135

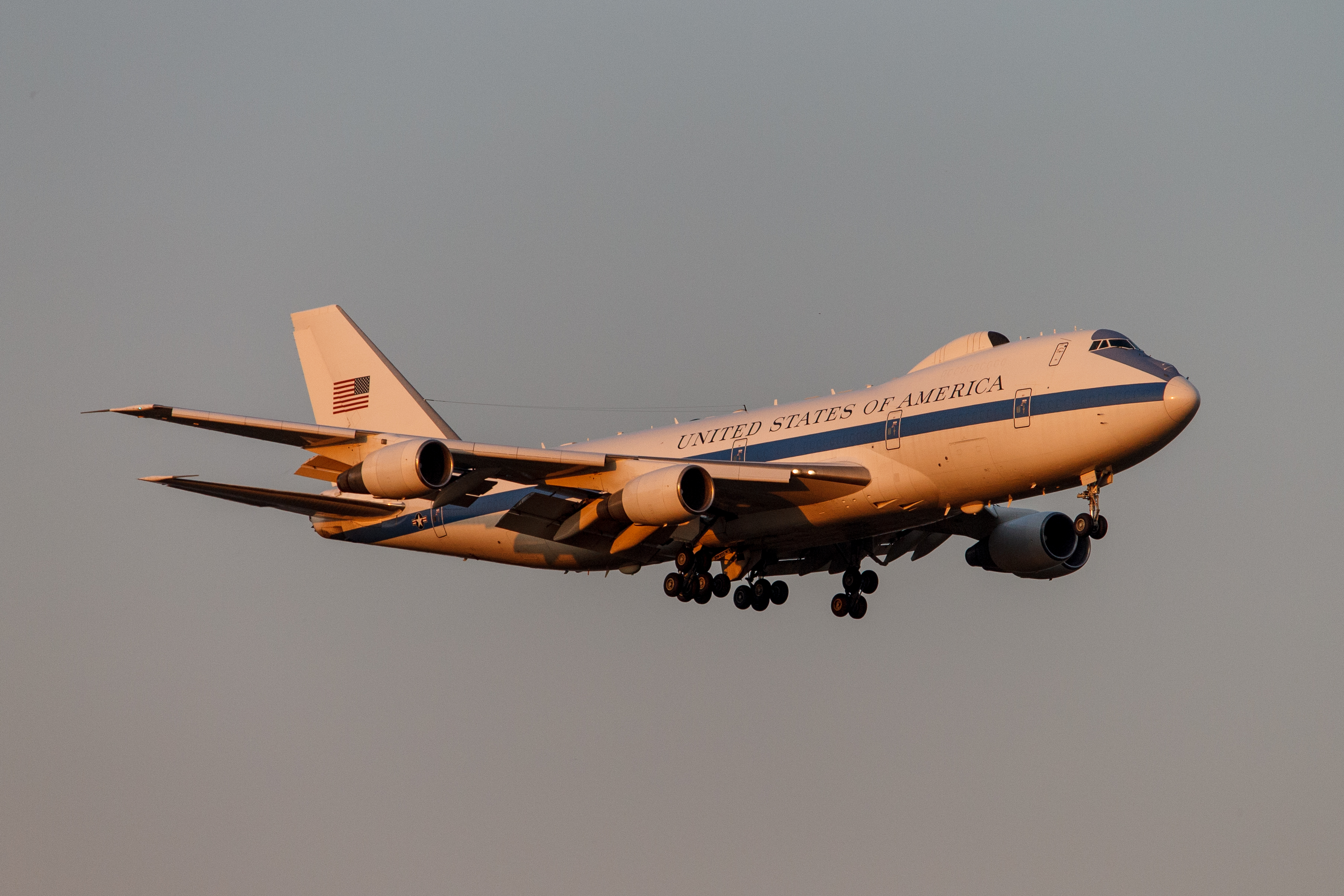
E-4

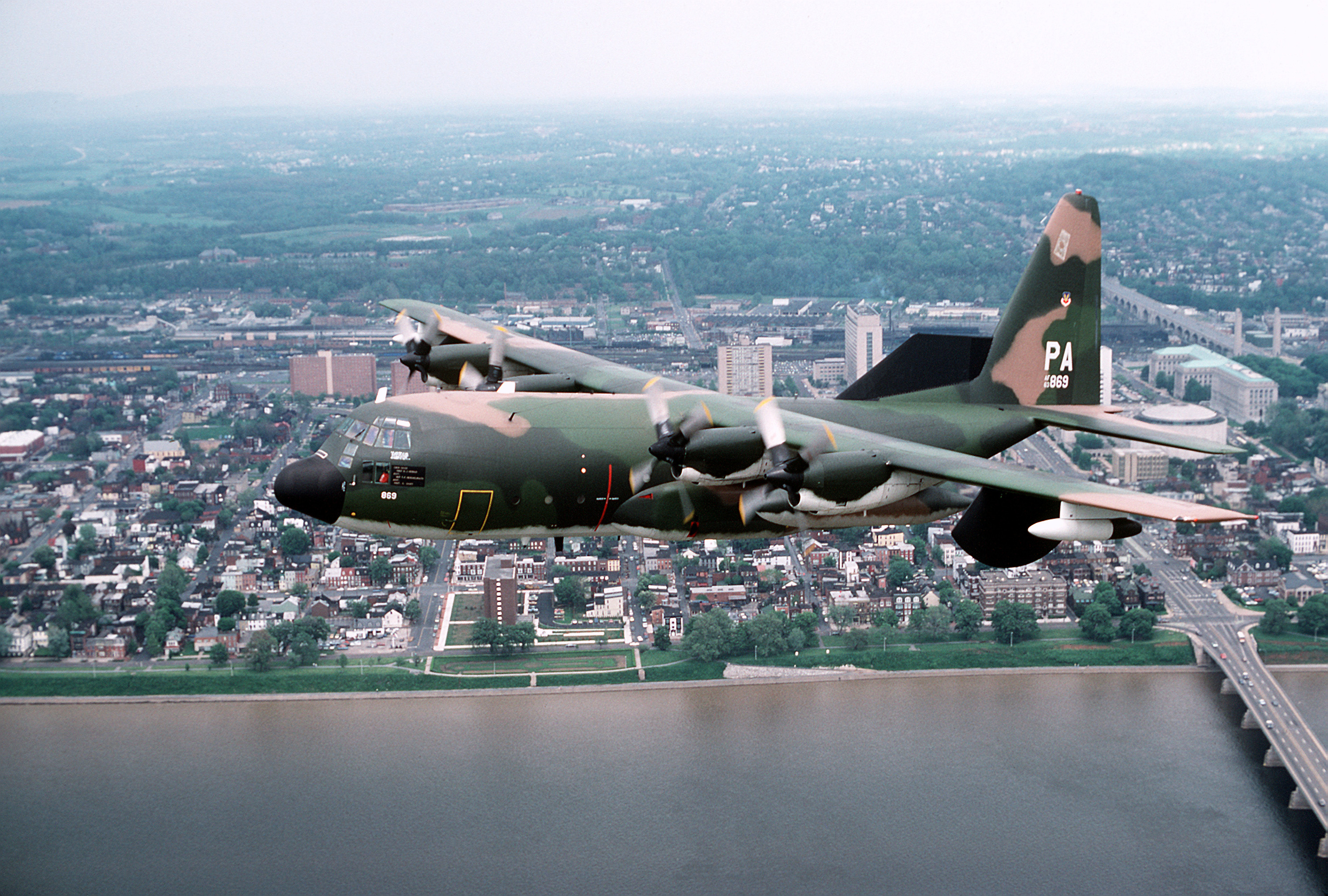
EC-130E

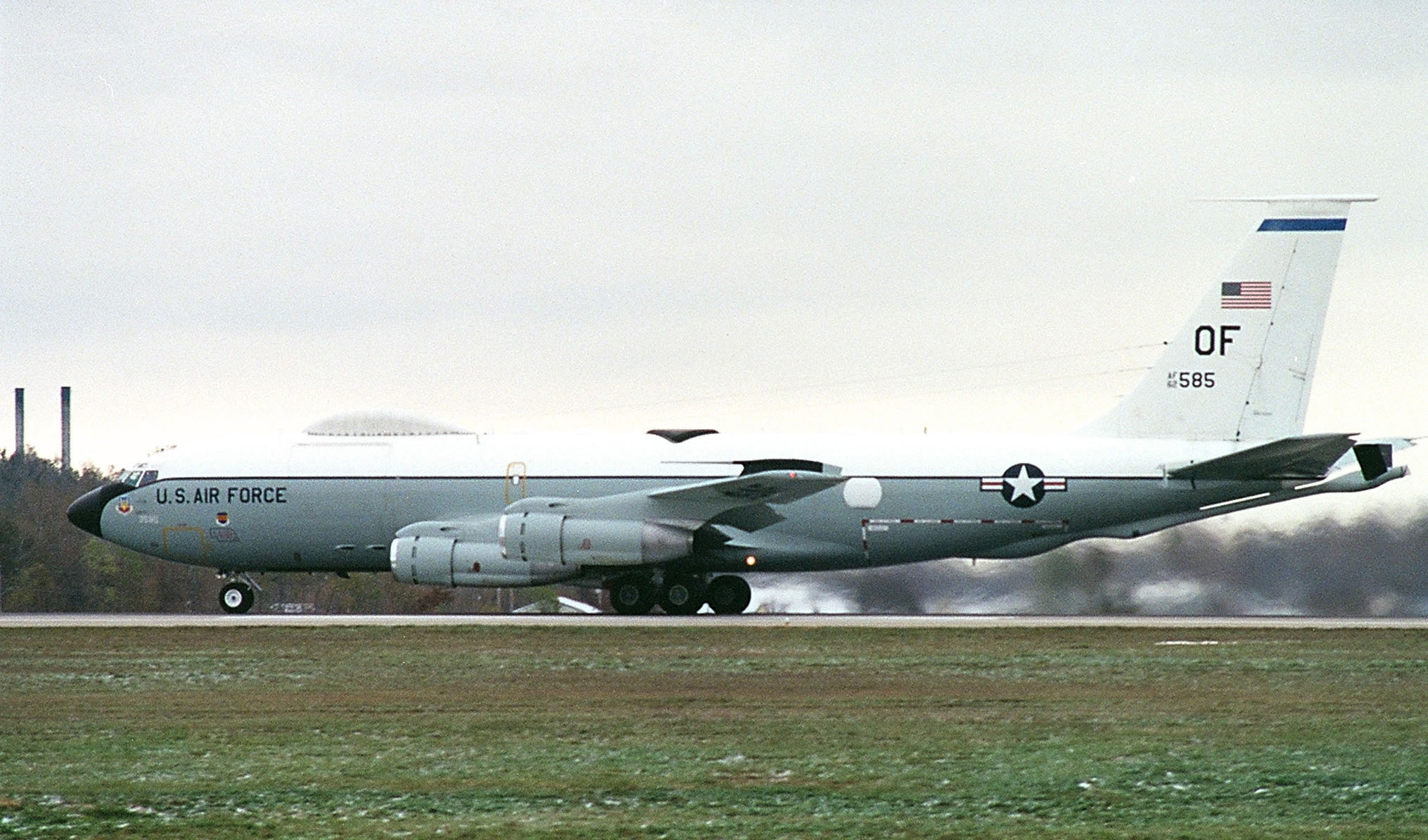
EC-135

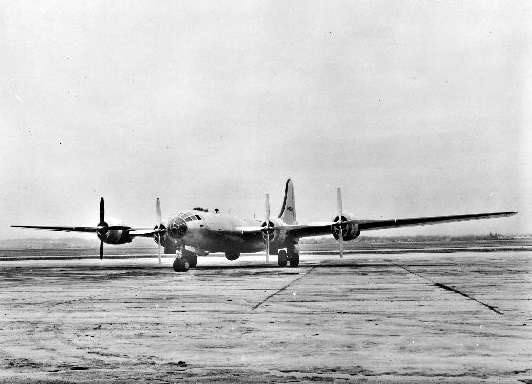
F-13

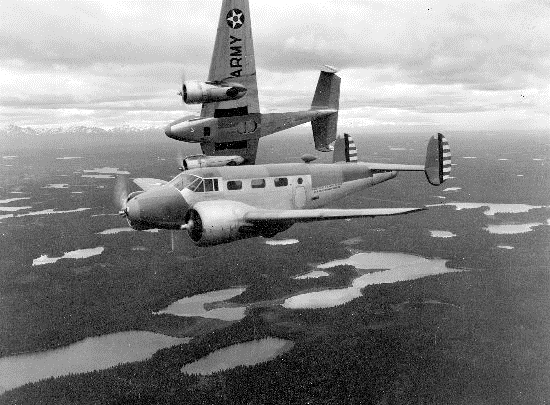
F-2

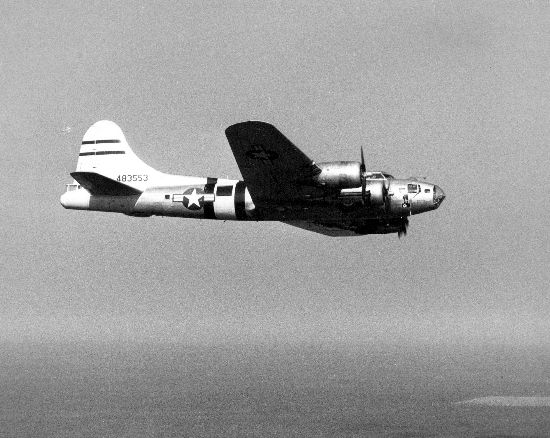
F-9

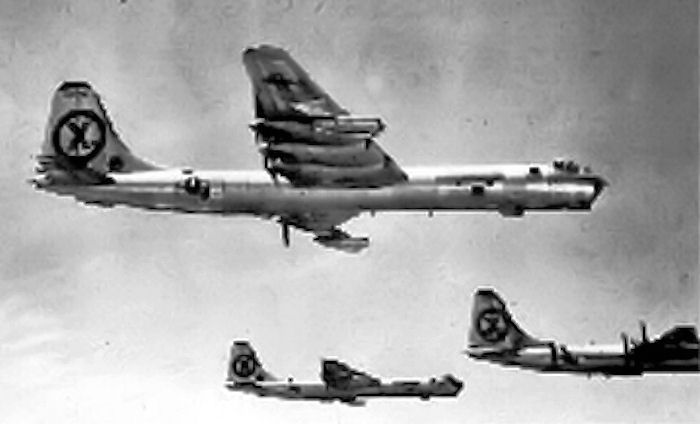
RB-36

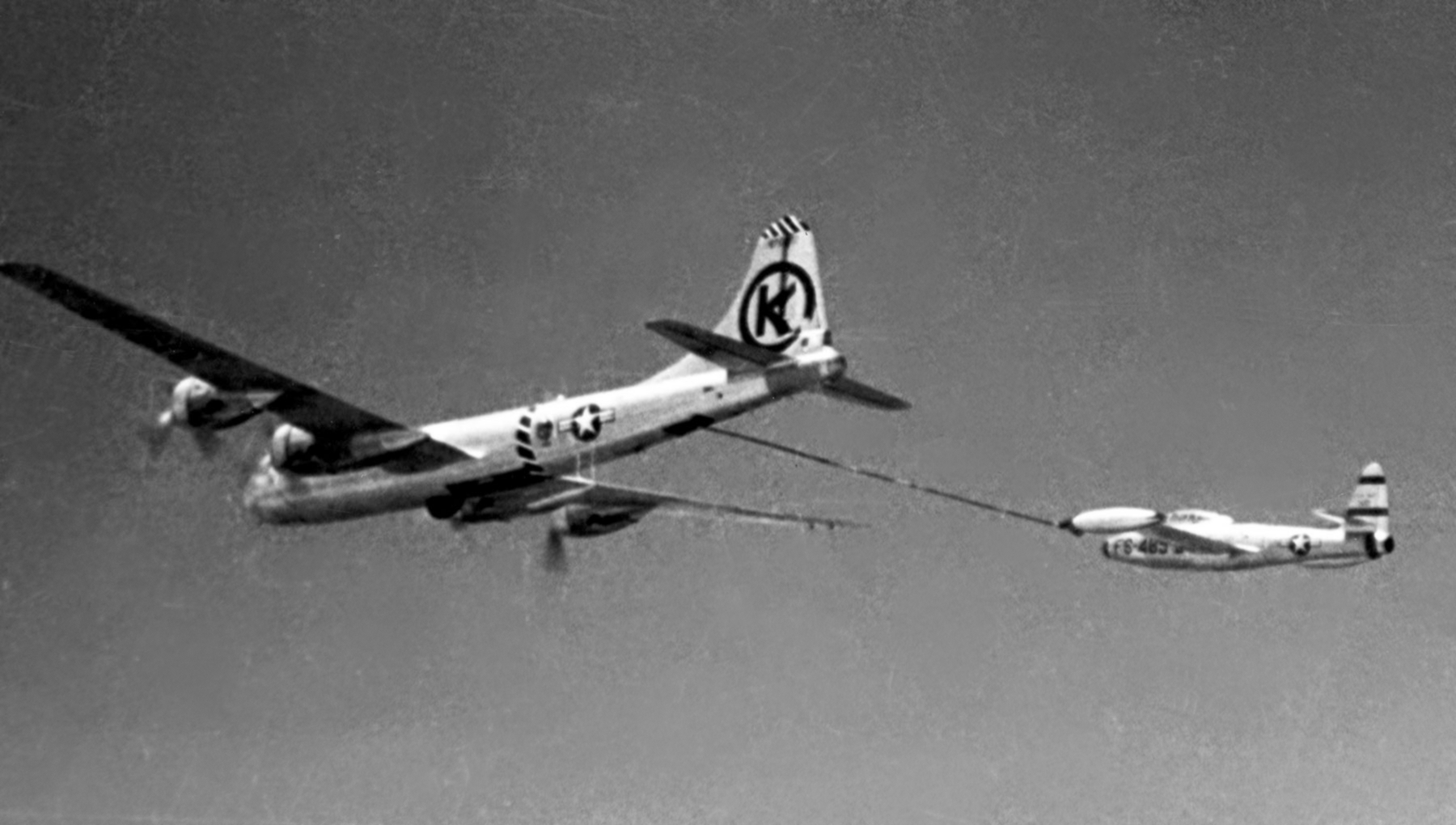
KB-29

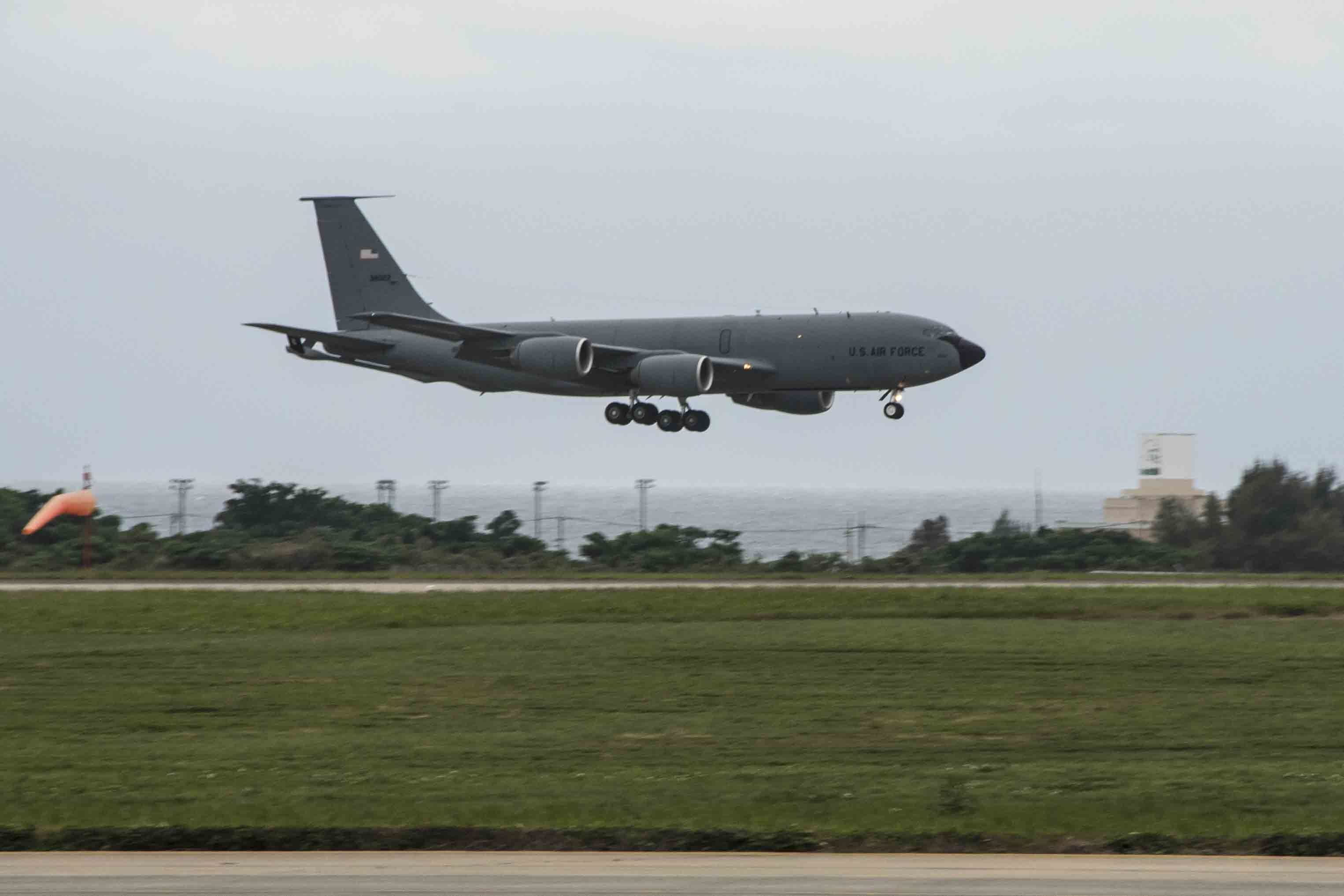
KC-135

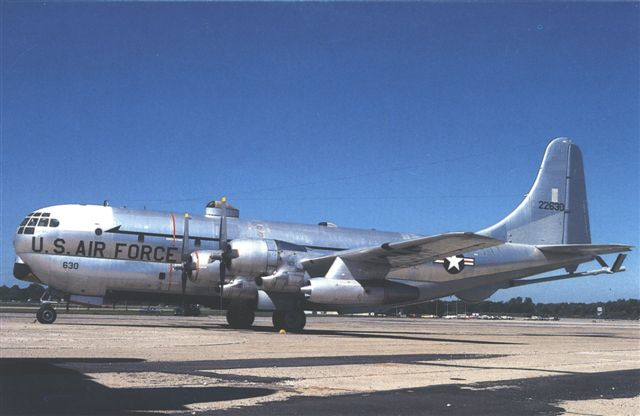
KC-97

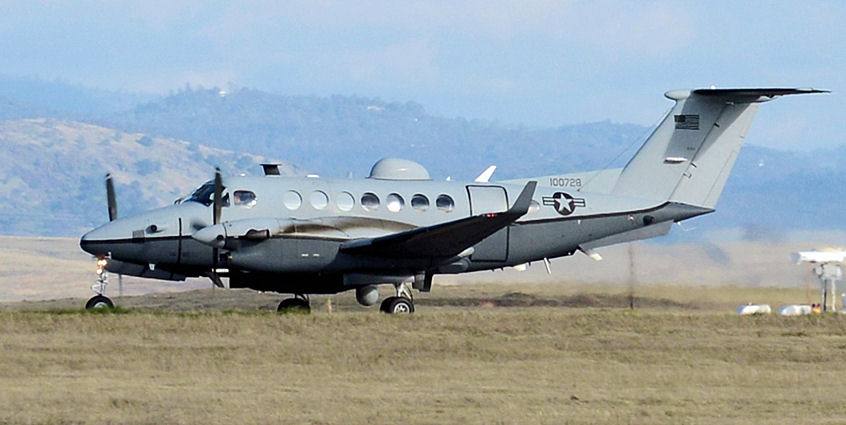
MC-12

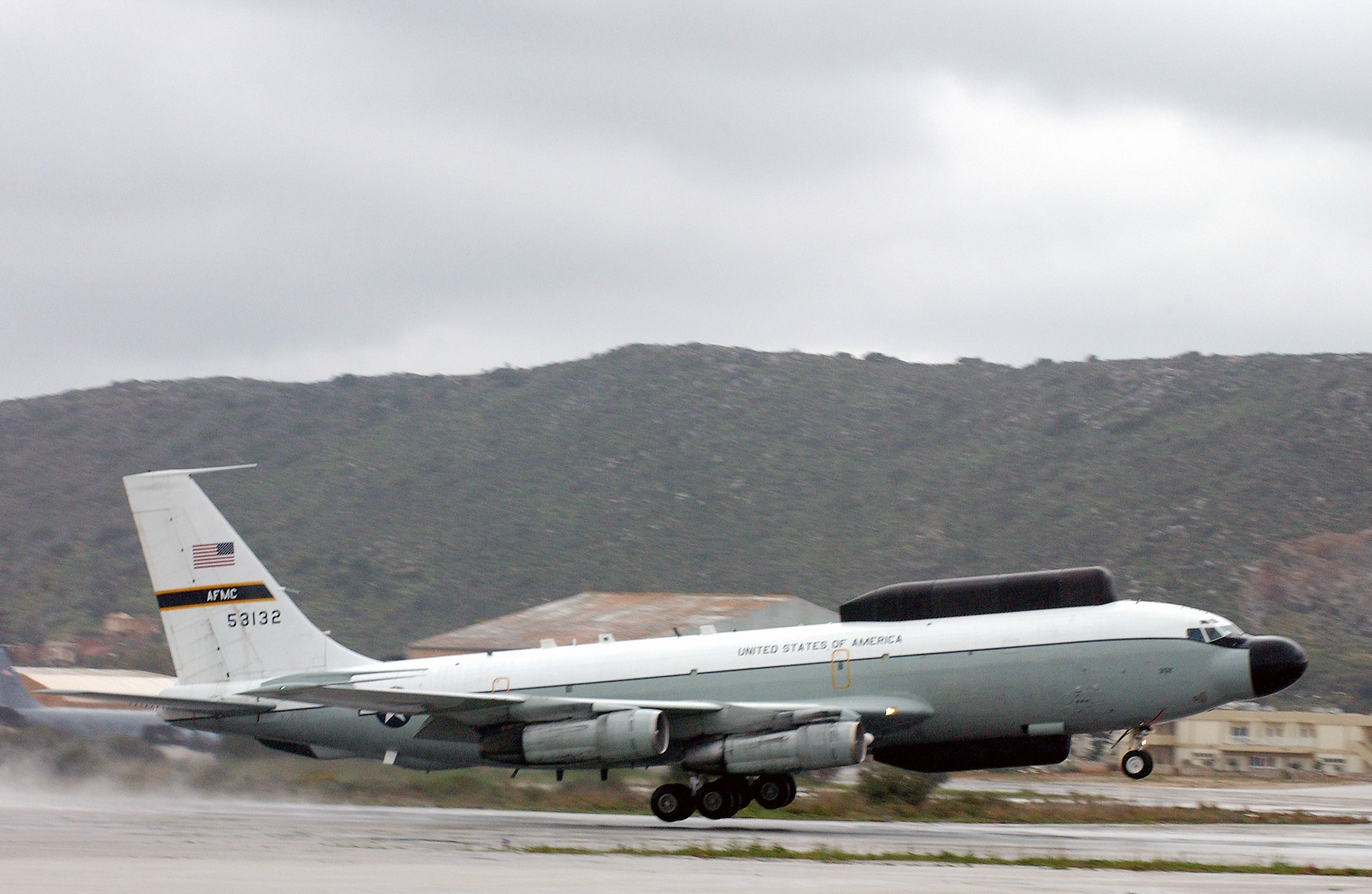
NKC-135

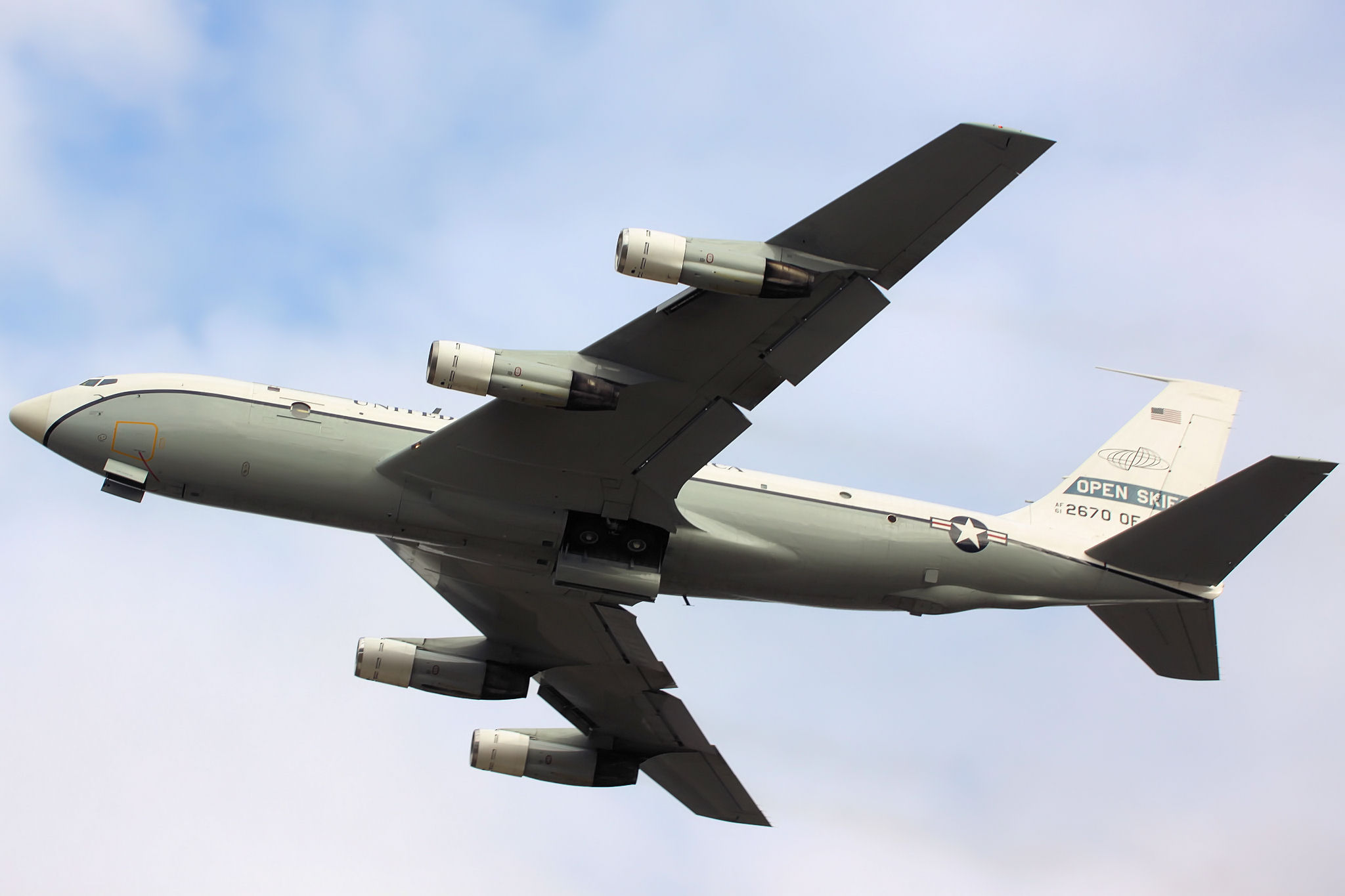
OC-135

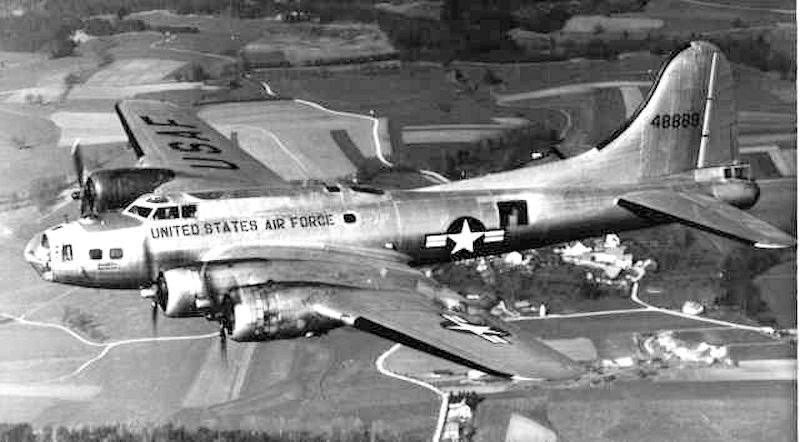
RB-17G (same as B-17 above)

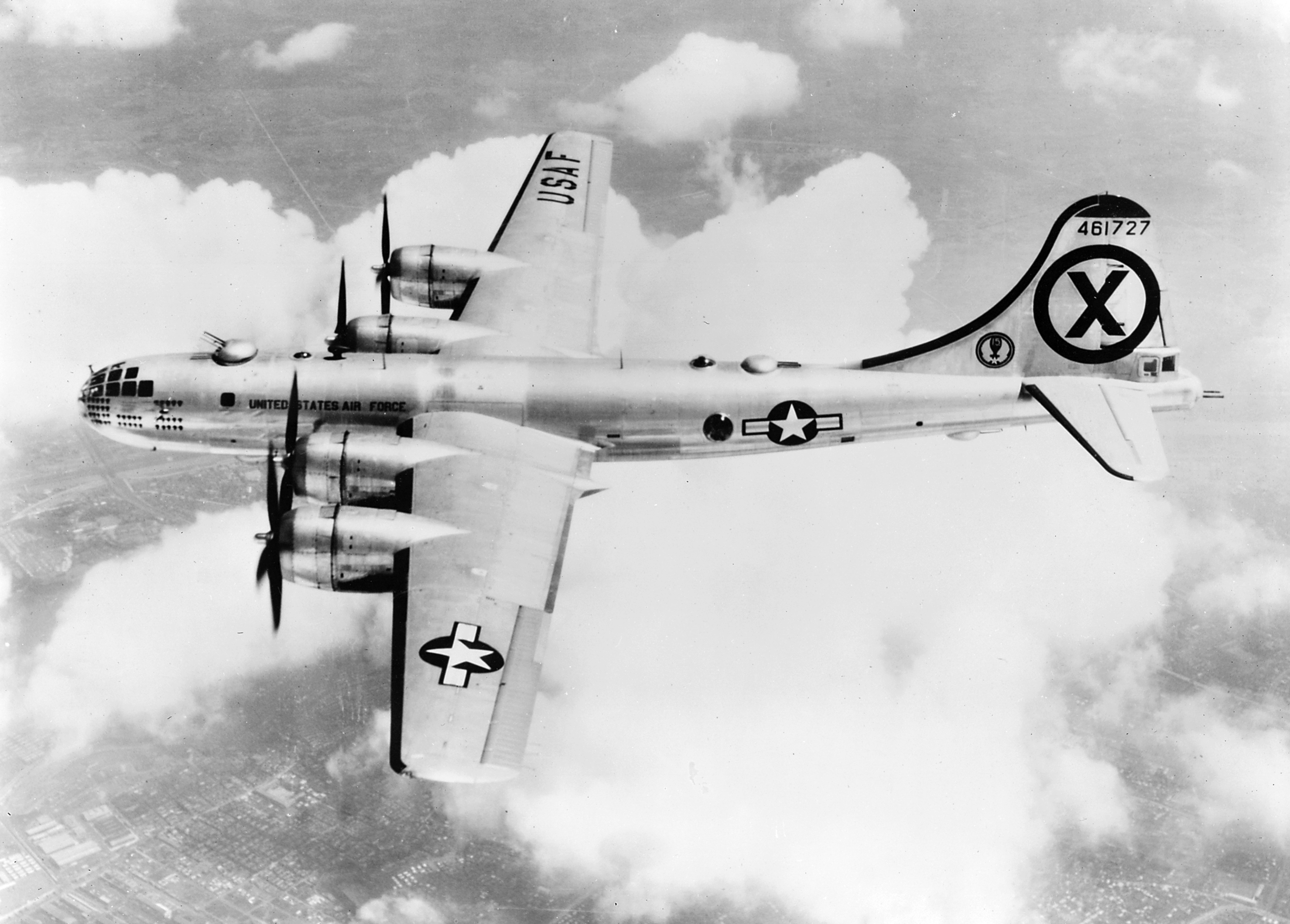
RB-29

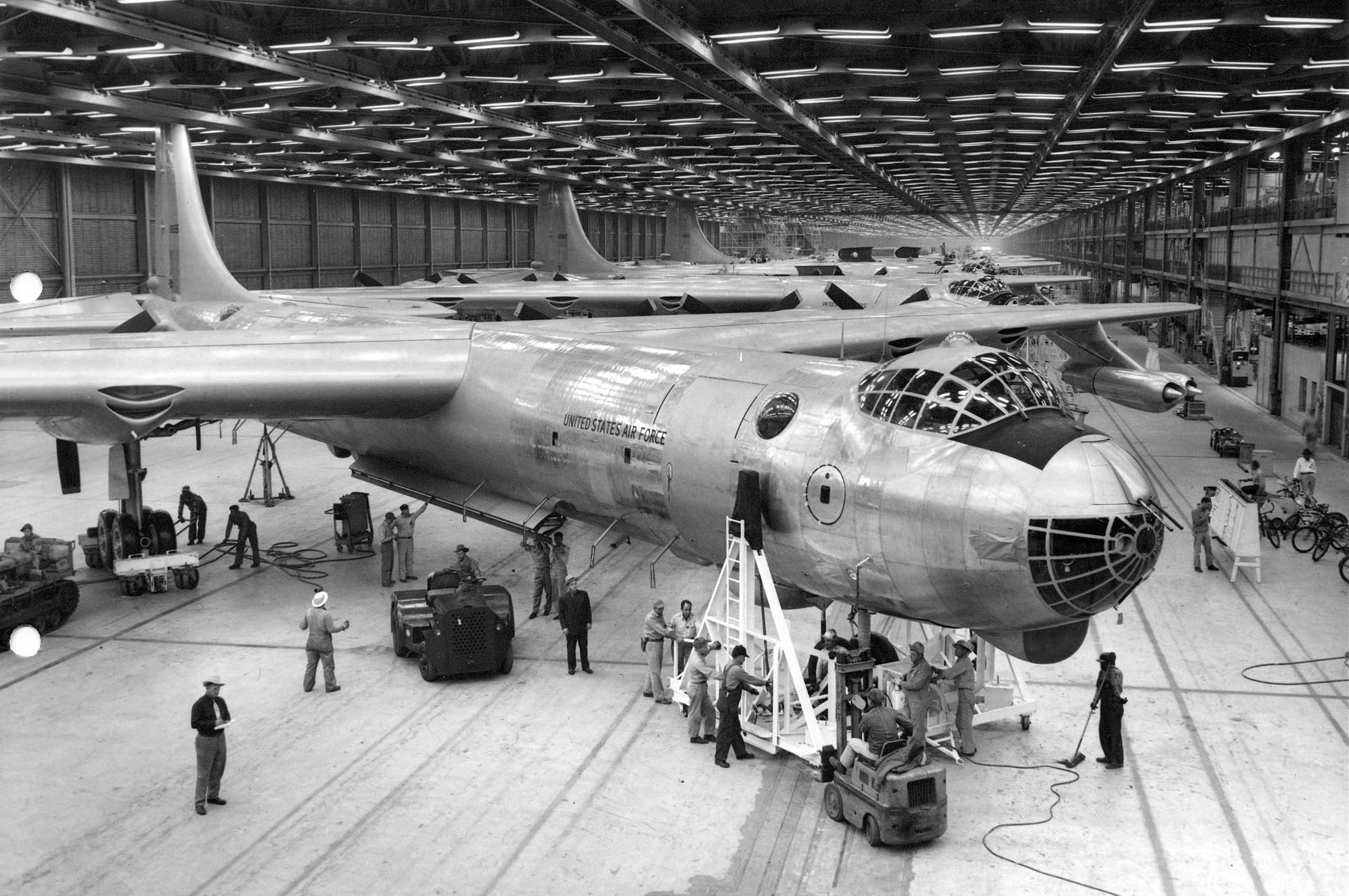
RB-36D

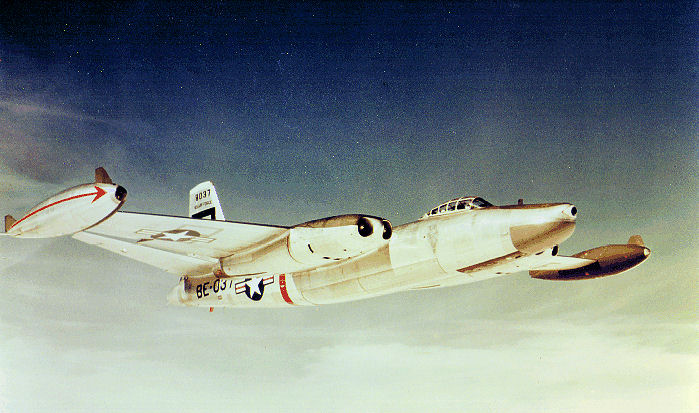
RB-45C

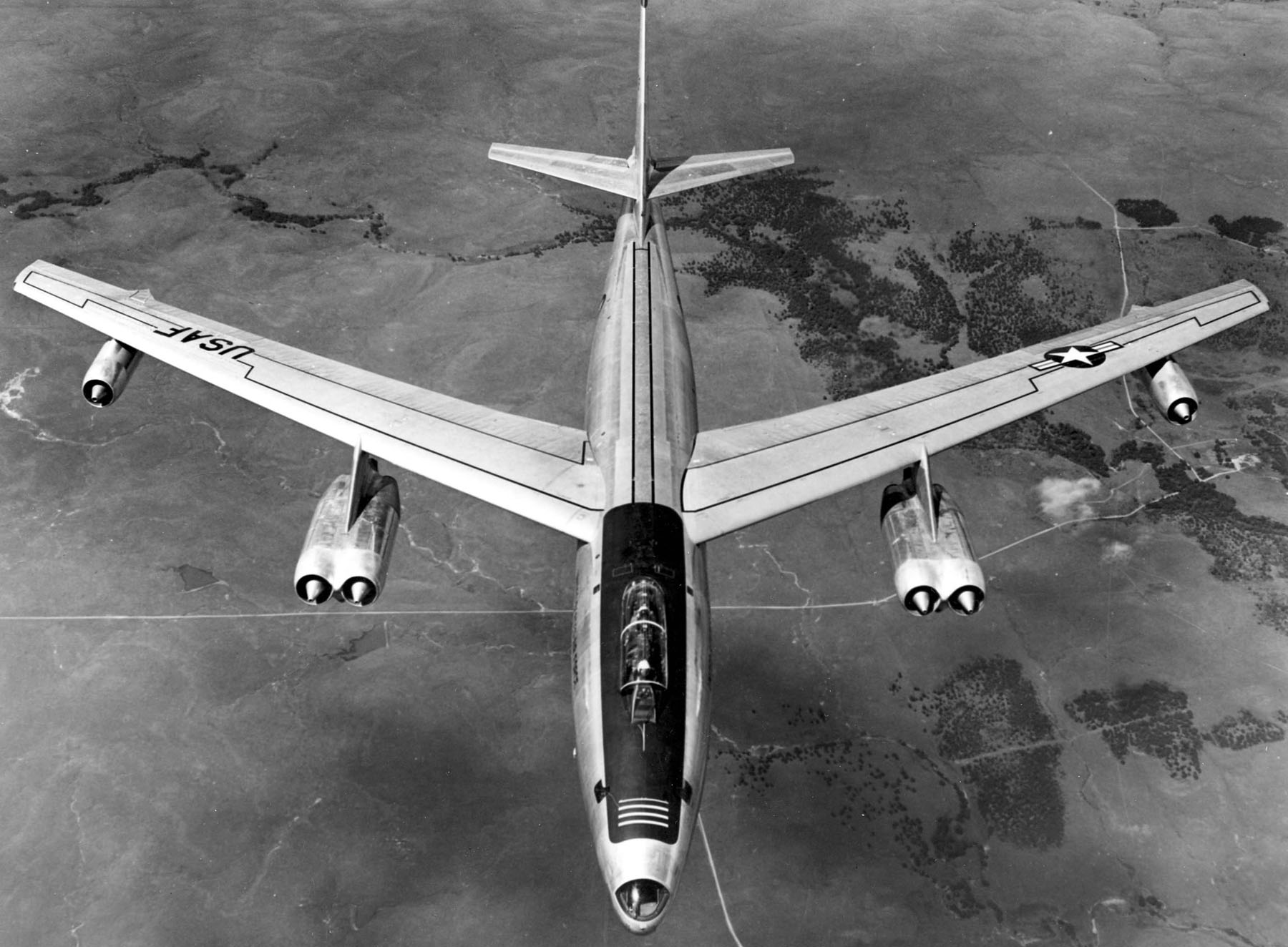
RB-47E (Same as B-47 above)

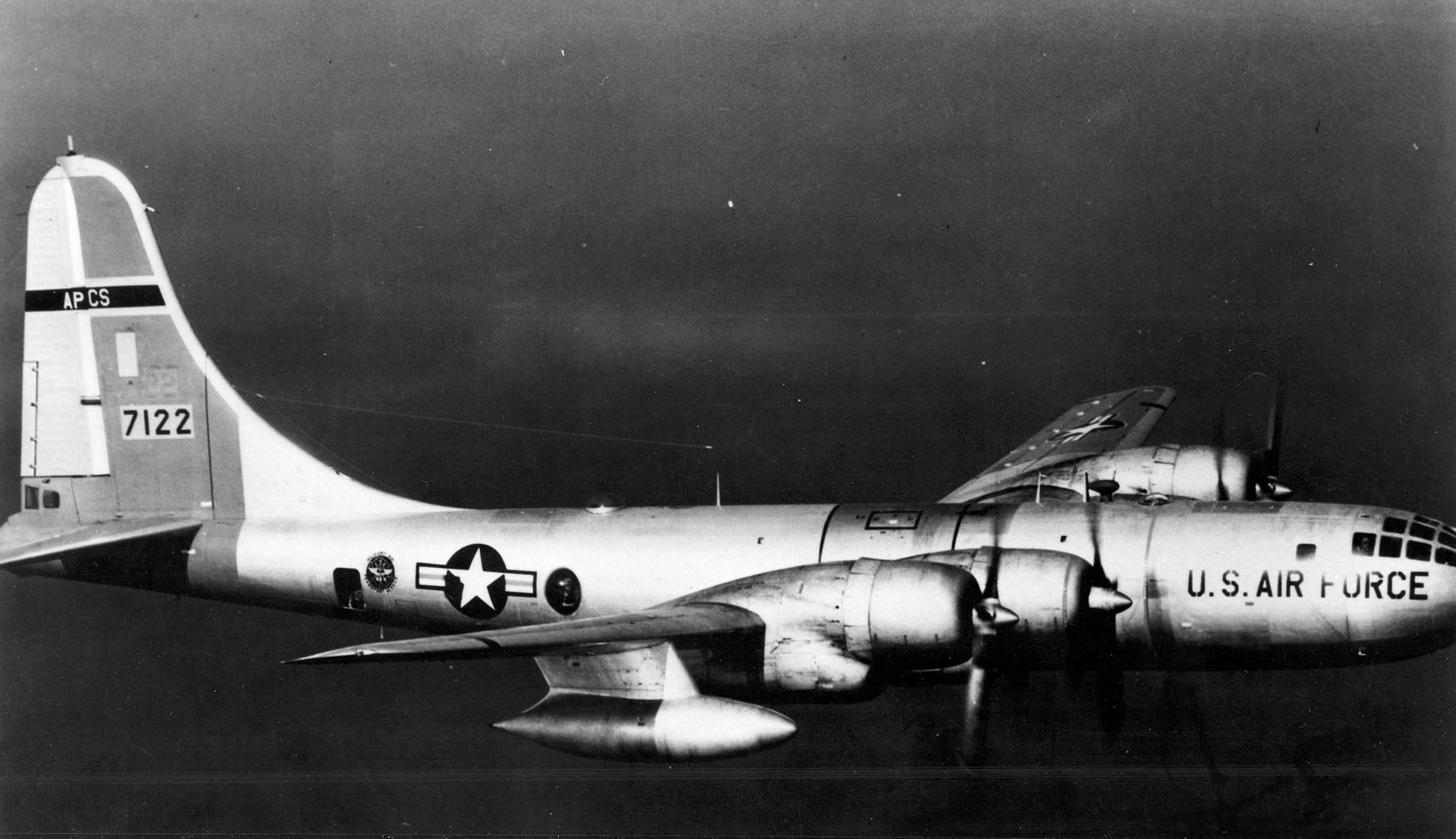
RB-50 (Same as B-50 above)

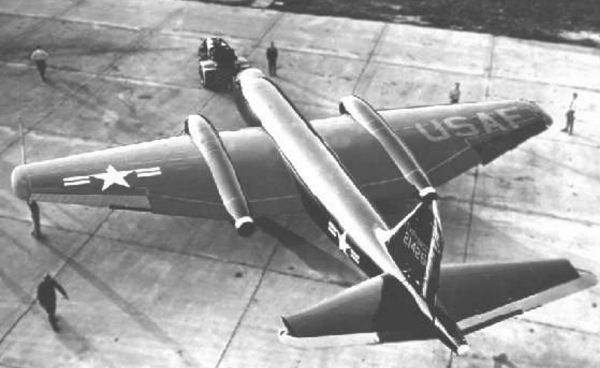
RB-57D

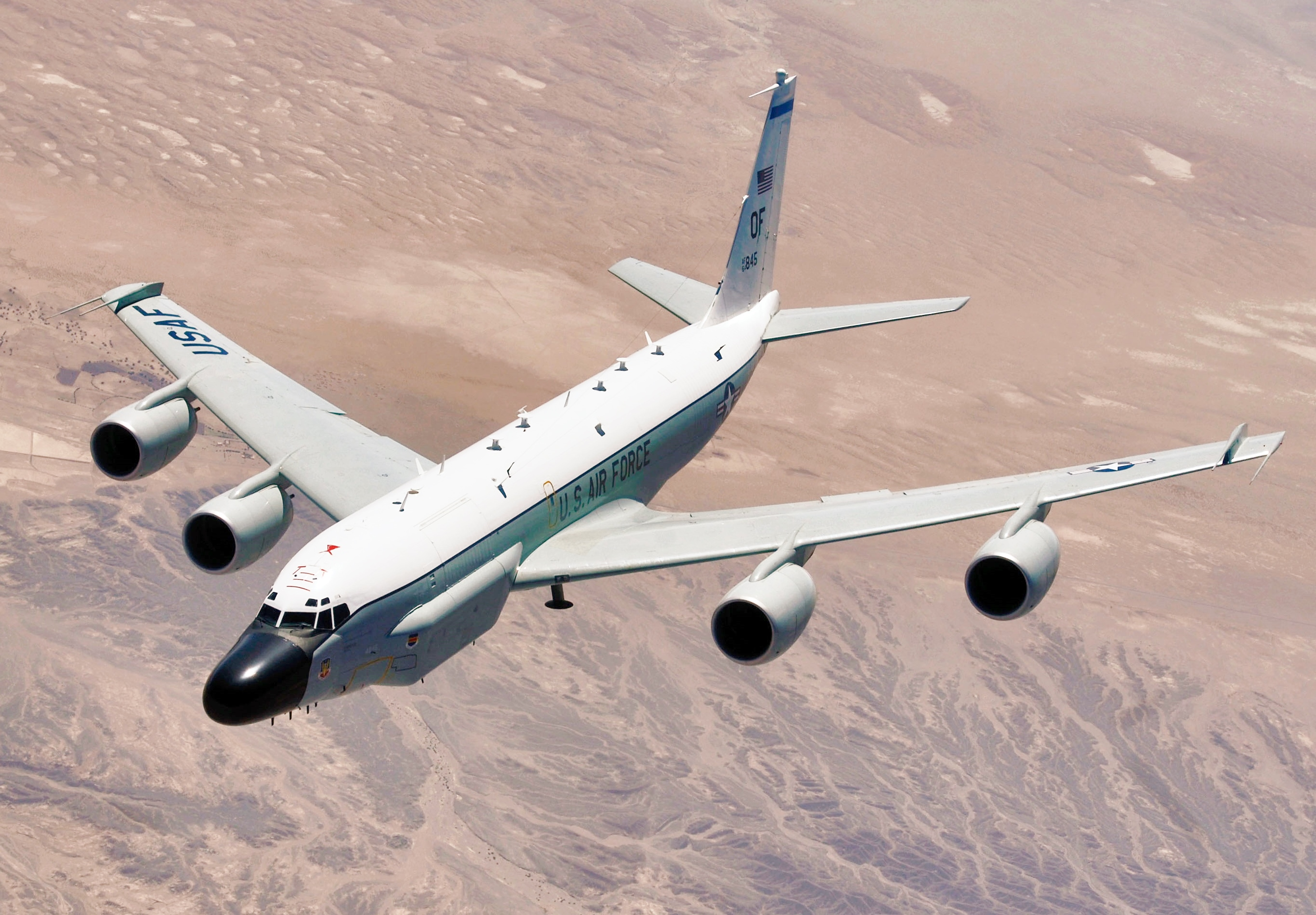
RC-135

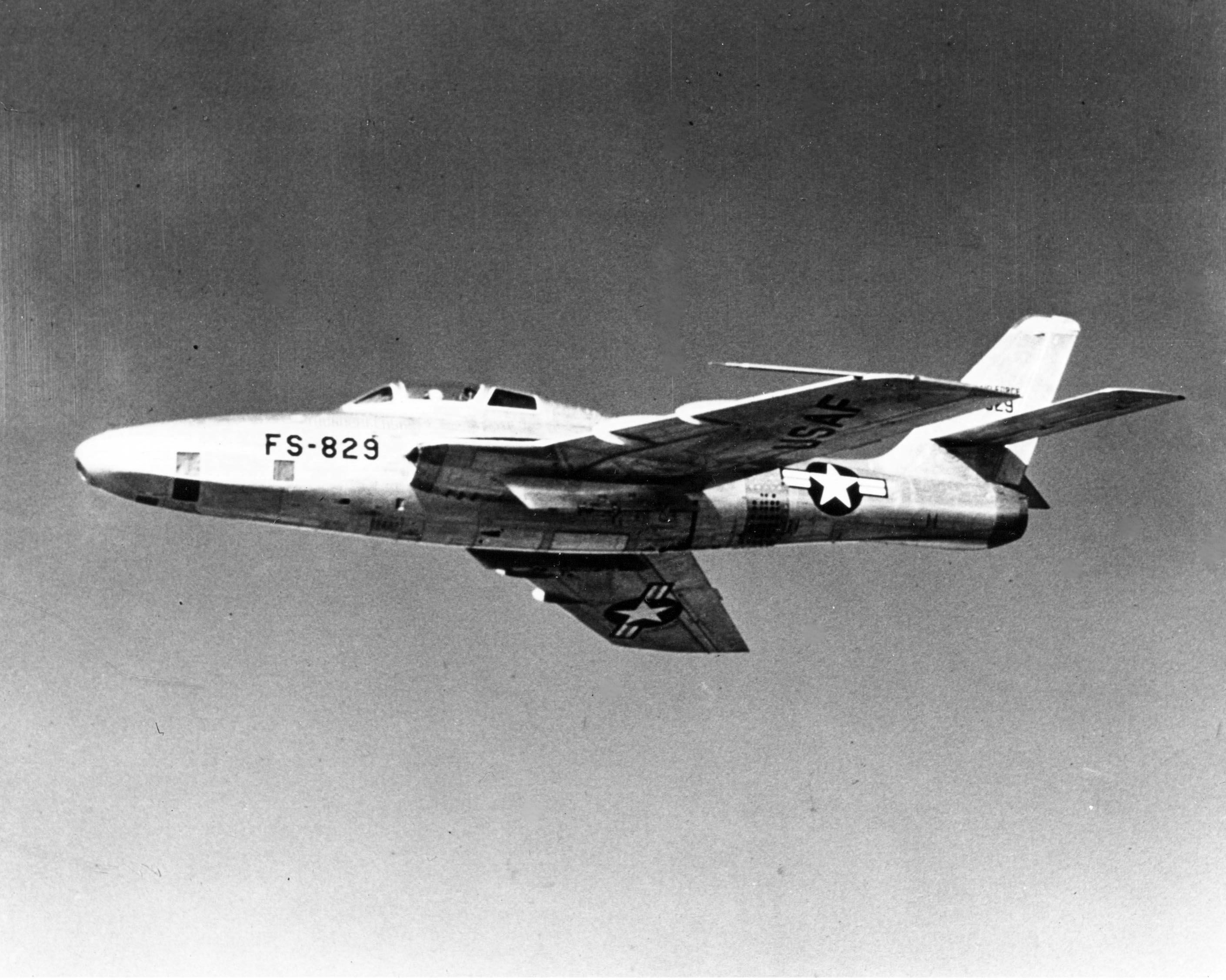
RF-84F

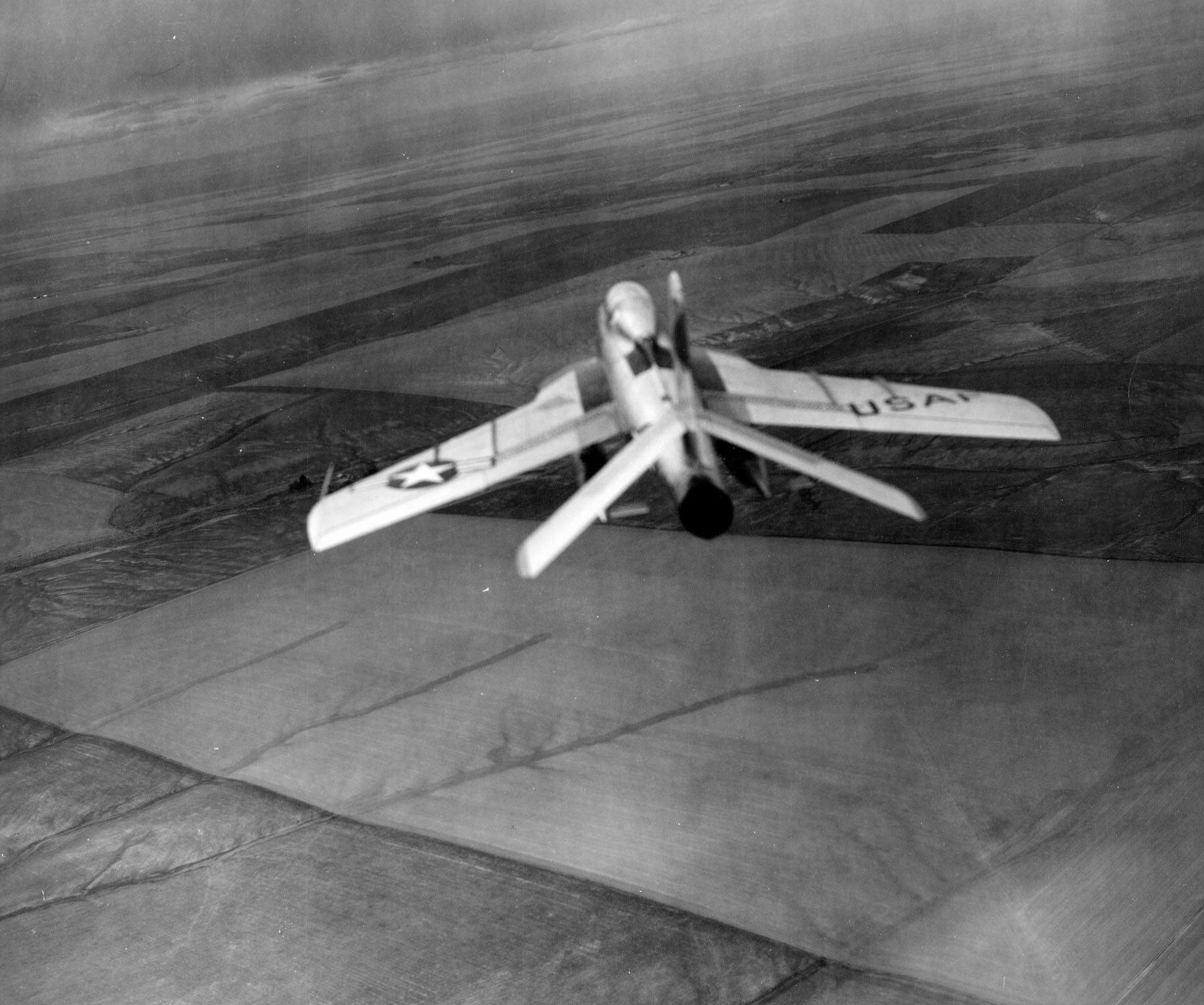
RF-84K Thunderflash (FICON)

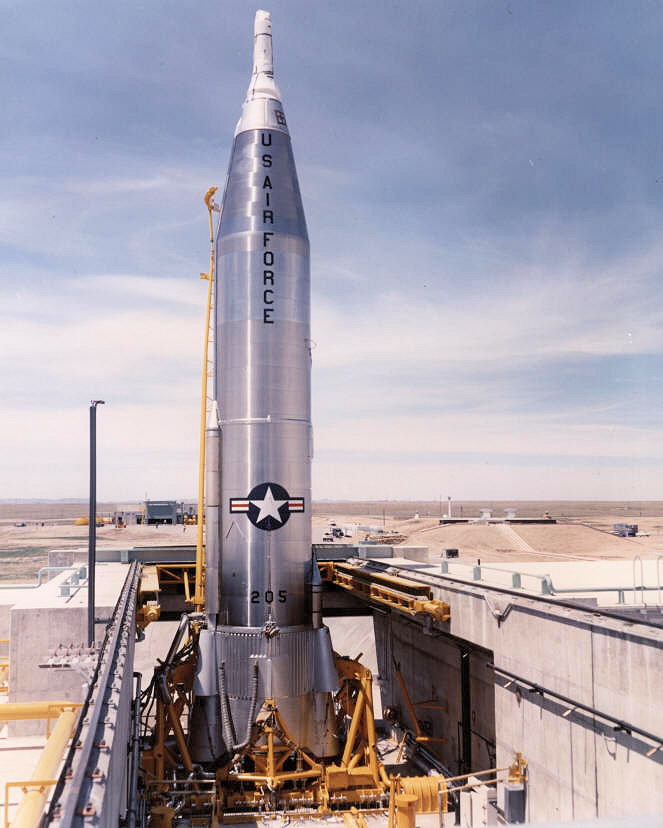
SM-65

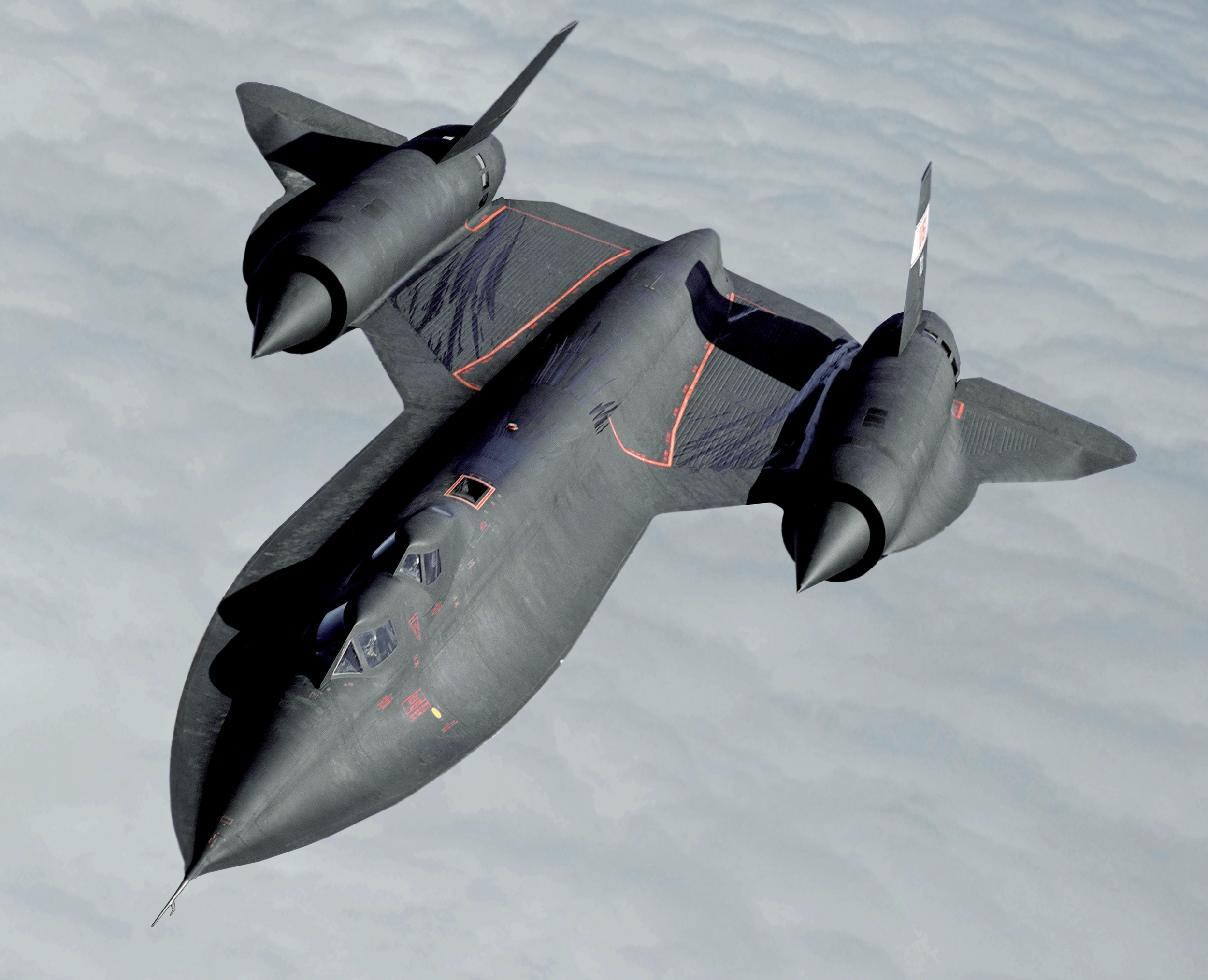
SR-71

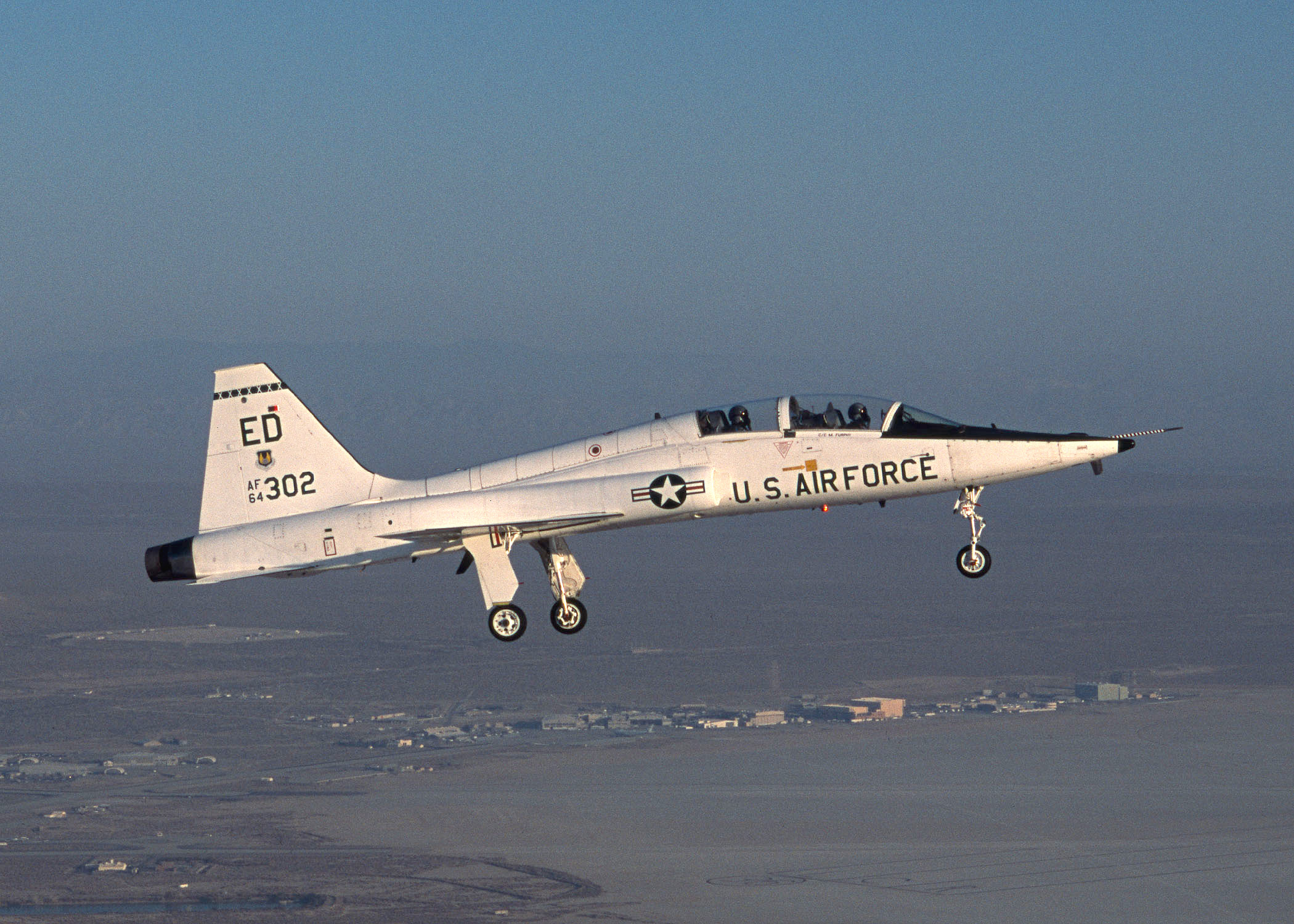
T-38

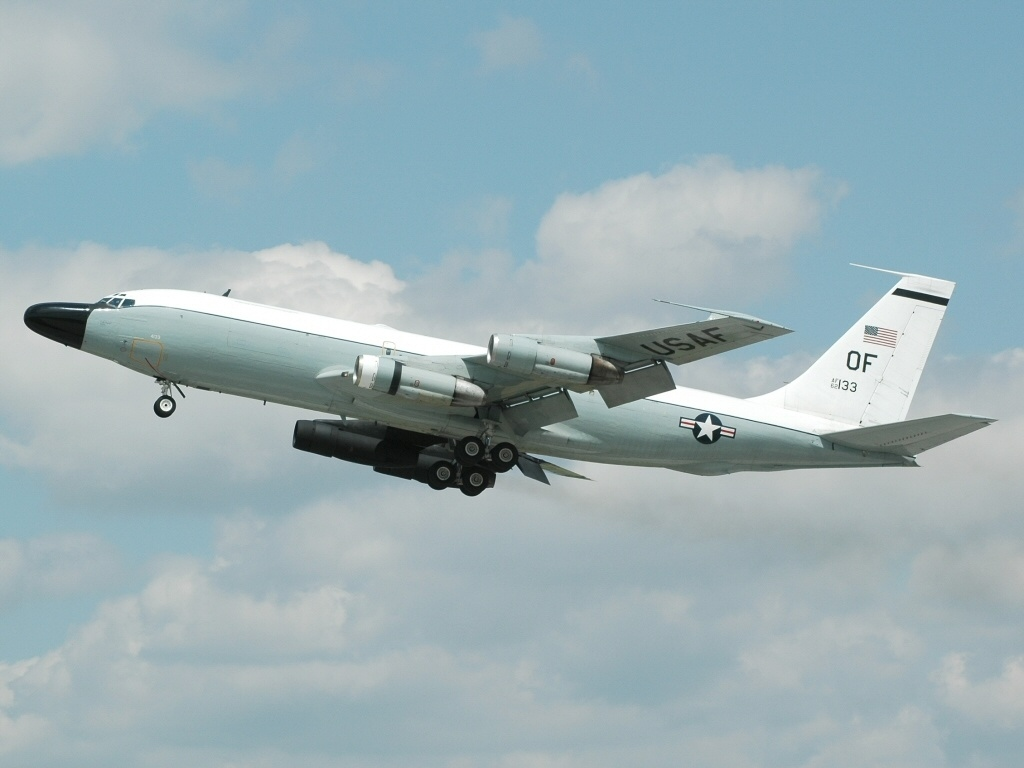
TC-135

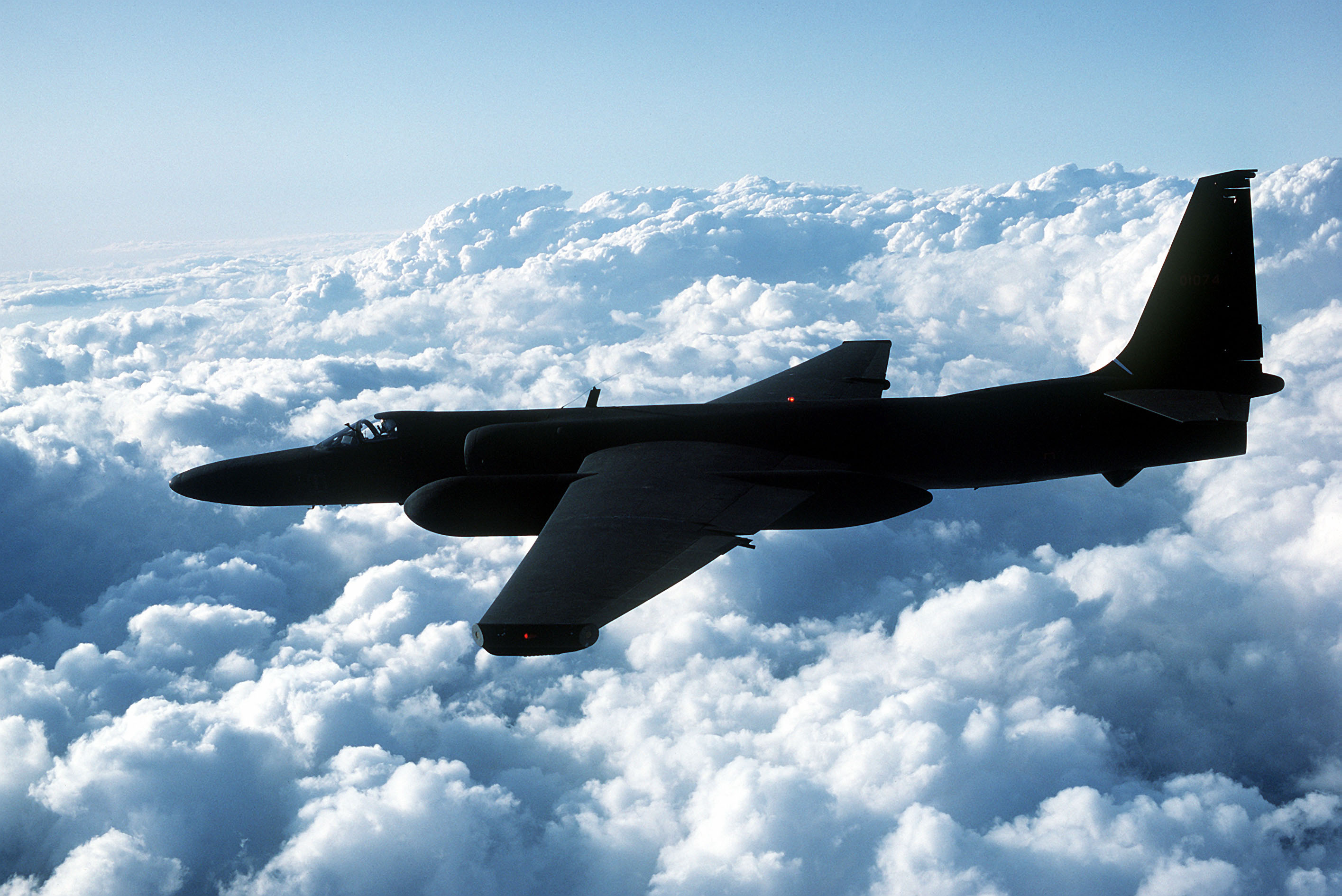
U-2

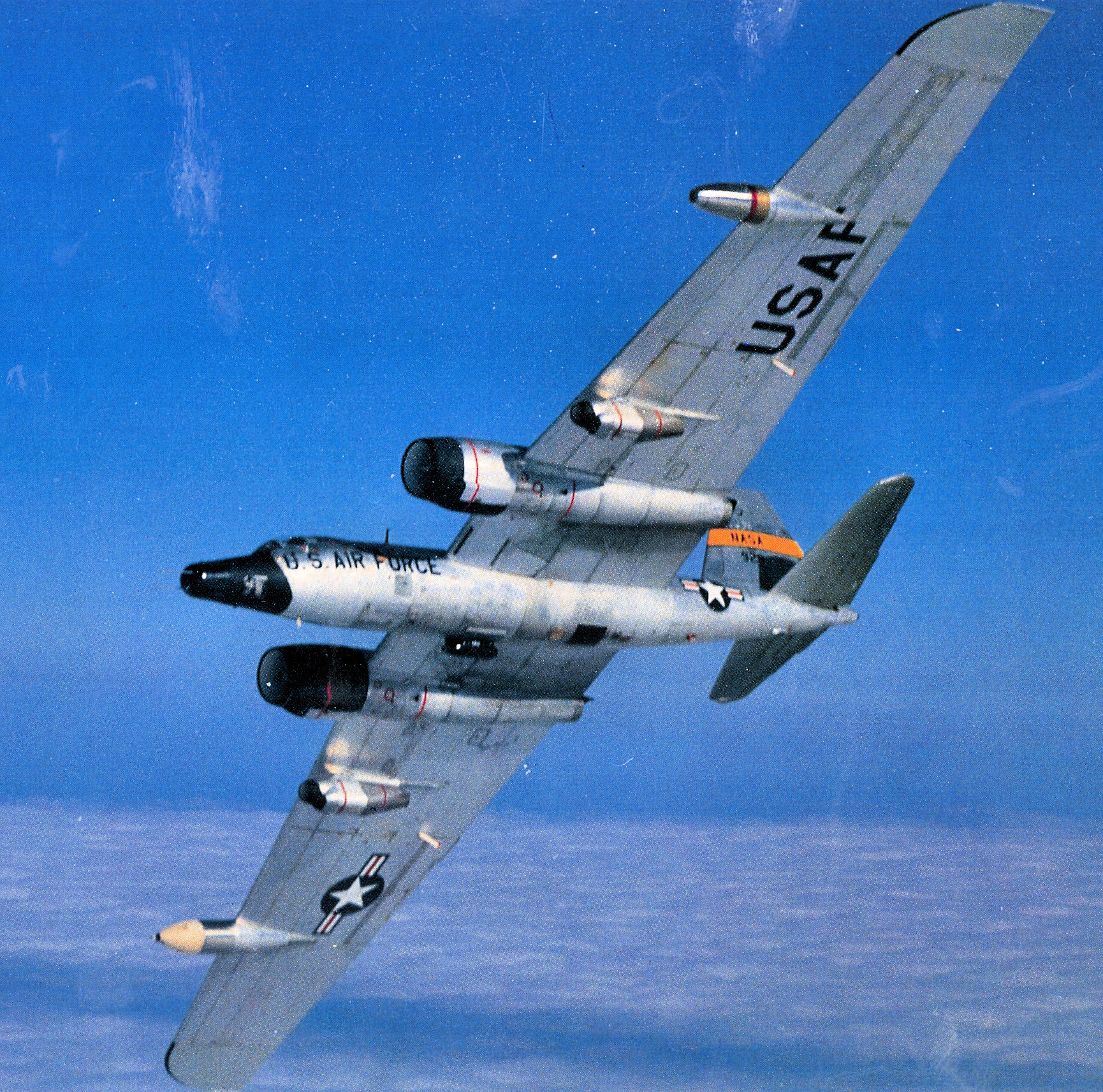
WB-57

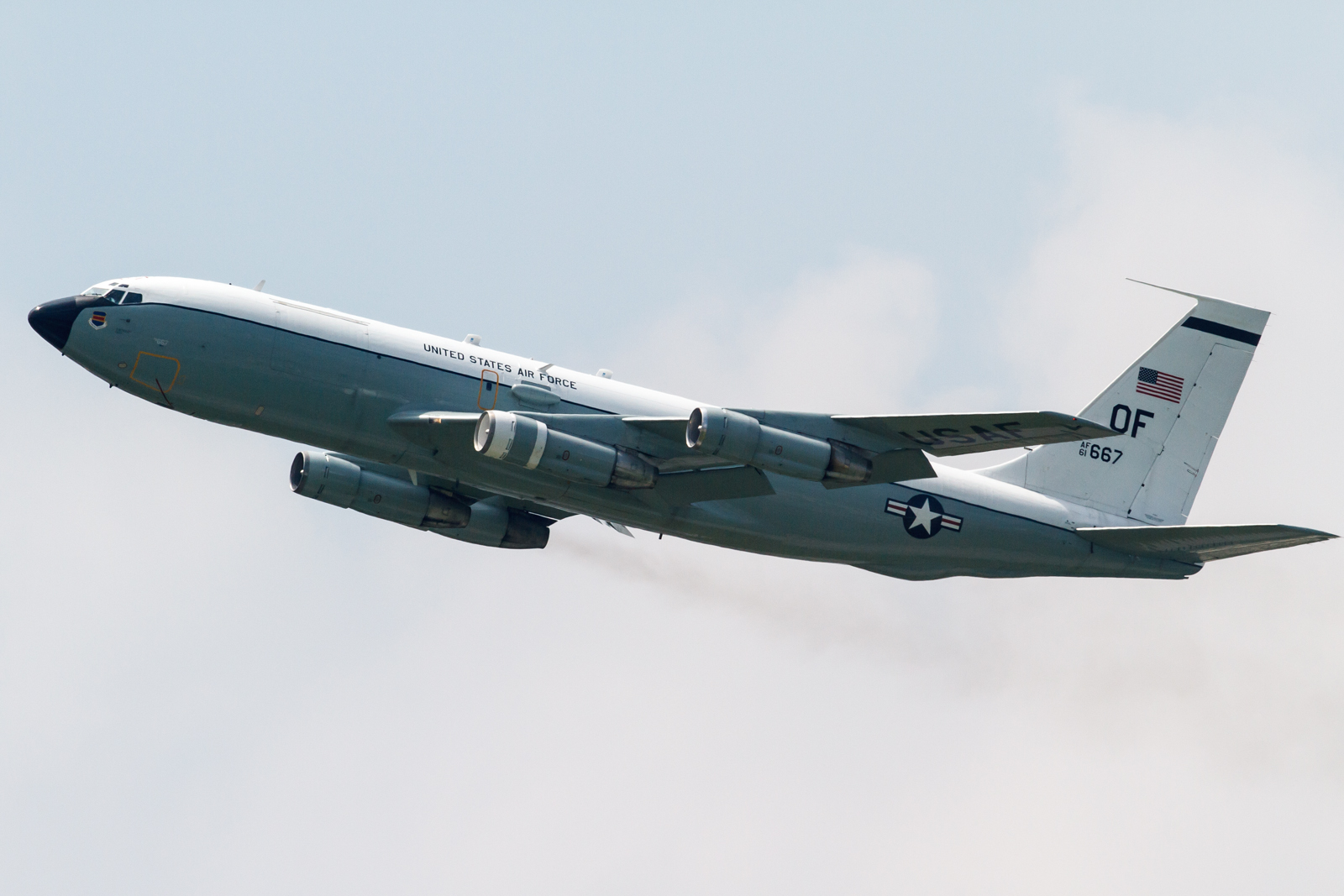
WC-135
