= List of United States Air Force strategic wings =

During the tremendous U.S. Air Force Strategic Air Command (SAC) expansion of the early and mid-fifties, bases become overcrowded, with some of them supporting as many as 90 B-47s and 40 KC-97s. The first B-52 wings were also extremely large – composed of 45 bombers and 15 or 20 KC-135s, all situated on one base. As the Soviet missile threat became more pronounced and warning time became less, SAC bases presented increasingly attractive targets. It was necessary to break up these large concentrations of aircraft and scatter them throughout more bases. Several KC-97 squadrons were separated from their parent B-47 wings and relocated to northern bases. The B-47 dispersal program was a long range one and would be affected primarily through the phase out of wings in the late fifties and early sixties.

With the B-52 force, which was still growing, dispersal became an active program in 1958. Basically the B-52 dispersal program called for larger B-52 wings already in existence to be broken up into three equal-sized wings of 15 aircraft each, with two of them being relocated, normally to bases of other commands. In essence, each dispersed B-52 squadron became a strategic wing. This principle would also be followed in organizing and equipping the remained of the B-52 force. Headquarters USAF established the entire force at 42 squadrons in 1958. Ideally, each B-52 wing would have an air refueling squadron of 10 or 15 aircraft.

By the end of 1958, SAC had activated 14 strategic wings, but only three had aircraft assigned. The others were in various stages of development, with some having only a headquarters and one officer and one airman authorized".

== Redesignation to AFCON status ==
When the B-52 dispersal began in the fifties, the new units created to support this program were named strategic wings and given four-digit designations, for example, the 4137th Strategic Wing. Under the USAF organization and lineage system, these four-digit units fell into the MAJCOM (major air command controlled) category and their lineage (histories, awards, and battle honors) ended with their discontinuance and could never be revived. In sharp contrast, AFCON (Headquarters USAF controlled) units, which were readily distinguished by having one, two or three digit designations, could go through a series of inactivations and activations and still retain their lineage.

Headquarters SAC was well aware of the historical significance of records and accomplishments of the strategic wings and the need to perpetuate this lineage as well as the lineage of many illustrious unit that were no longer active.

In order to retain the lineage of the combat units and to perpetuate the lineage of many currently inactive units with illustrious World War II records, Headquarters SAC received authority from Headquarters USAF to discontinue its strategic wings that were equipped with combat aircraft and to activated AFCON units, most of which were inactive at the time.

The reorganization process, which extended from 1 January through 1 September, was applied to 22 B-52 strategic wings, three air-refueling wings, and the 4321st Strategic Wing at Offutt Air Force Base, Nebraska. These units were discontinued and two and three-digit AFCON units were activated. In most cases, the bombardment squadron that had been assigned to the strategic wings were inactivated and bombardment squadrons that had previously been assigned to the newly activated wings were activated. While these actions were almost tantamount to redesignation, they were not official redesignation. Therefore, the records, awards and achievements of the strategic wing could not be inherited by the bomb wings".

=== 6th Strategic Wing ===
- Redesignated on: 25 March 1967.
- At: Eielson AFB, AK.
- Assigned to: Fifteenth Air Force, 18th Strategic Aerospace Division.
- Equipment: KC-135A/Q's, RC-135D's, RC-135E, & RC135S's.
- Reassigned to: Fifteenth Air Force, 12th Strategic Aerospace Division on 2 July 1968.
- Reassigned to: Fifteenth Air Force, 14th Strategic Aerospace Division on 30 June 1971.
- Reassigned to: Fifteenth Air Force, 47th Air Division on 1 October 1976.
- Reassigned to: Fifteenth Air Force, 14th Air Division on 1 October 1985.
- Changed equipment in: 1985 to KC-135s, RC-135s, TC-135s.
- Redesignated as: 6th Strategic Reconnaissance Wing on 1 April 1988.
  - Detachment 1 Designated on 25 March 1967.
  - Located at: Shemya Air Force Base

=== 43d Strategic Wing ===
- Redesignated on: 4 February 1970.
- Activated on: 1 April 1970.
- At: Andersen AFB, Guam.
- Assigned to: Eighth Air Force. (Attached to the Air Division, Provisional, 57 from 1 June 1972 to 1 November 1973).
- Equipment: B-52s, KC-135s
- Reassigned to: Strategic Air Command, 3rd Air Division on 1 January 1975.
- Reassigned to: Fifteenth Air Force, 3rd Air Division on 31 January 1982.
- Redesignated on: 4 November 1986 as 43rd Bombardment Wing.

It activated again in Apr 1970, replacing the 3960 Strategic Wing at Andersen AFB, Guam. On 1 July 1970, the 43d also assumed tasks formerly handled by the Bombardment Wing, Provisional, 4133, including a combat mission. Employed attached aircraft and aircrews of other Strategic Air Command units to participate in "Arc Light" combat missions in Southeast Asia from 1 July to mid-Aug 1970, and again from Feb 1972 to Aug 1973. Following the end of combat operations, provided routing training and ground alert with B-52 and KC-135 aircraft, the latter provided by other Strategic Air Command units on loan. During 1975, provided logistical and medical support to thousands of Vietnamese refugees evacuated from their homeland and located temporarily at Guam awaiting resettlement in the United States. Trained to remain proficient in strategic and conventional warfare capabilities. Beginning in 1974, controlled TDY tankers and crews participating in the Pacific (formerly Andersen) Tanker Task Force that supported Strategic Air Command operations in the western Pacific. In Jul 1986, activated the 65 Strategic Squadron to control the TDY air refueling forces.

=== Strategic Wing, Provisional, 72 ===
- Established: Late 1972
- At: Andersen AFB, Guam
- Discontinued: 15 November 1973

Activated on paper on 16 June 1952, but not operational until it absorbed the residual resources of the 55th Strategic Reconnaissance Wing in October 1952. Designated as the 72nd Strategic Reconnaissance Wing at Ramey AFB, PR. Conducted global strategic reconnaissance, Mar. 1953–1955, with RB-36 Peacemaker aircraft, gradually shifting to a bombardment-training mission beginning in 1954. Redesignated as the 72nd Bombardment Wing (Heavy)in 1955 Converted to B-52Gs and added refueling to its global mission in 1958. It was inactivated on 30 June 1971. Established as the Strategic Wing (Provisional), 72 in late 1972 at Andersen AFB, Guam, with approximately 100 B-52Gs. The Strategic Wing (Provisional), 72 flew 8,010 sorties over South Vietnam, North Vietnam, and Cambodia and flew the last sorties of the Vietnam War on 15 August 1973. The wing lost 6 B-52Gs (one aircraft lost skirting around a typhoon en route to target, and five shot down over Hanoi during combat operations in December 1972.

=== 95th Strategic Wing ===
- Activated on: 2 October 1966.
- At: Goose AB, Canada.
- Assigned to: Strategic Air Command.
- Equipment: KC-135s (attached).
- Reassigned to: Eighth Air Force, 45th Air Division on 2 October 1966.
- Reassigned to: Second Air Force, 45th Air Division on 31 March 1970.
- Reassigned to: Eighth Air Force, 45th Air Division on 1 January 1975.
- Inactivated on: 30 September 1976.

=== 98th Strategic Wing ===
- Activated on: 25 June 1966.
- At: Torrejon AB, Spain.
- Assigned to: Strategic Air Command.
- Equipment: KC-135s (attached)/ Spanish Tanker Task Force.
- Inactivated on: 31 December 1976.
- Detachment 1
  - Activated on: 25 June 1966.
  - Located at: RAF Upper Heyford, UK
  - Relocated to: RAF Mildenhall, UK 1 April 1970
  - Equipment: RC-135s KC-135s
  - Inactivated on: 31 December 1976.

=== 306th Strategic Wing ===
- Redesignated on: 14 August 1976.
- At: Ramstein AB, Germany.
- Assigned to: Strategic Air Command.
- Equipment: KC-135s, RC-135s.
- Moved to: RAF Mildenhall, UK in 1978.
- Reassigned to: Strategic Air Command, 7th Air Division on 1 July 1978.
- Reassigned to: Eighth Air Force, 7th Air Division on 1 January 1982.
- Inactivated on: 1 March 1992.

=== 307th Strategic Wing ===
- Redesignated on: 21 January 1970
- Activated on: 1 April 1970.
- At: U-Tapao, Thailand.
- Assigned to: Eighth Air Force. (Attached to Air Division, Provisional, 17 from 1 June 1972 to 31 December 1974).
- Equipment: B-52Ds, KC-135A's.
- Changed equipment in: 1973 to B-52s.
- Changed equipment in: 1974 to B-52s, KC-135s.
- Changed equipment in: 1975 to B-52s, KC-135s,
- Reassigned on: Strategic Air Command, 3rd Air Division on 1 January 1975.
- Inactivated on: 30 September 1975.

=== Strategic Wing, Provisional, 310 ===
- Established: 1 June 1972
- At: U-Tapao RTNAF, Thailand.
- Attached to: Air Division, Provisional, 17
- Equipment: KC-135A's (Young Tiger Tanker Task Force)
- Assigned Squadron's: Air Refueling Squadron, Provisional, 901
- Air Refueling Squadron, Provisional, 902
- Discontinued on: 1 July 1974

=== 376th Strategic Wing (1970–1991) ===
- Replaced 4252nd Strategic Wing
- Established: 1 April 1970
- At: Kadena AB, Okinawa (Island returned to Japan on 15 April 1972)
- Assigned to: Eighth Air Force 1 April 1970
- 3rd Air Division 1 January 1975*Equipment: B-52D's (to Mid 1970) KC-135A/Q's RC-135's
- Assigned Squadron's: 909th Air Refueling Squadron
- 82nd Strategic Reconnaissance Squadron
- Inactivated: O/A 1991

=== 3918th Strategic Wing ===
- Activated on: 1 February 1964.
- At: RAF Upper Heyford, England
- Assigned to: Strategic Air Command, 7th Air Division.
- Inactivated on: 31 March 1965.

=== 3920th Strategic Wing ===
- Activated on: 1 February 1964.
- At: RAF Brize Norton, England
- Assigned to: Strategic Air Command, 7th Air Division.
- Inactivated on: 31 March 1965.

=== 3960th Strategic Wing ===
- Redesignated on: 1 November 1965.
- At: Andersen AFB, Guam.
- Assigned to: Strategic Air Command, 3rd Air Division.
- Inactivated on: 1 April 1970.

Resources absorbed by 43rd Strategic Wing in 1970.

=== 3970th Strategic Wing ===
- Activated on: 1 February 1964
- At: Torrejon AB, Spain.
- Assigned to: Sixteenth Air Force, 65th Air Division.
- Reassigned to: Strategic Air Command on 15 April 1966.
- Inactivated on: 25 June 1966.

Replaced by 98th Strategic Wing in 1966

=== 3973d Strategic Wing ===
- Activated on: 1 February 1964.
- At: Moron AB, Spain.
- Assigned to: Sixteenth Air Force, 65TH Air Division..
- Reassigned to: USAFE on 15 April 1966.

=== 4026th Strategic Wing ===
- Activated on: 1 August 1958.
- At: Wurtsmith AFB, MI.
- Equipment: KC-135's. (B-52H's were delivered to the 379th BW Spring/Summer 1961)
- Assigned to: Eighth Air Force.
- Reassigned to: Second Air Force on 1 January 1959.
- Reassigned to: Second Air Force, 40th Air Division on 1 July 1959.
- Inactivated on: 9 January 1961

Replaced by 379th Bombardment Wing in 1961.

=== 4038th Strategic Wing ===
- Activated on: 1 August 1958.
- At: Dow AFB, ME.
- Equipment: B-52G's KC-135's.
- Assigned to: Eighth Air Force.
- Reassigned to: Eighth Air Force, 820th Air Division on 1 January 1959
- Reassigned to: Eighth Air Force, 6th Air Division on 1 April 1961.
- Inactivated on: 1 February 1963

Replaced by 397th Bombardment Wing in 1963.

=== 4039th Strategic Wing ===
- Activated on: 8 August 1958.
- At: Griffiss AFB, NY.
- Assigned to: Eighth Air Force.
- Equipment: B-52s.
- Reassigned to: Eighth Air Force. 820th Air Division on 5 January 1959
- Reassigned to: Eighth Air Force, 6th Air Division on 1 April 1961.
- Inactivated on: 1 February 1963.

Resources absorbed by 416th Bombardment Wing in 1963.

=== 4042d Strategic Wing ===
- Activated on: 1 August 1958.
- At: K. I. Sawyer AFB, MI.
- Assigned to: Eighth Air Force.
- Equipment: B-52s.
- Reassigned to: Second Air Force on 9 January 1959.
- Reassigned to: Second Air Force, 40th Air Division on 1 July 1959.
- Inactivated on: 1 February 1963.

Replaced by 410th Bombardment Wing in 1963.

=== 4043d Strategic Wing ===
- Activated on: 1 April 1959.
- At: Wright-Patterson AFB, OH.
- Assigned to: Second Air Force.
- Equipment: B-52s.
- Reassigned to: Second Air Force, 40th Air Division on 1 July 1959.
- Inactivated on: 1 February 1963.

Resources absorbed by 17th Bombardment Wing in 1959.

=== 4047th Strategic Wing ===
- Activated on: 1 July 1961
- At McCoy AFB, FL.
- Assigned to: Eighth Air Force, 823rd Air Division.
- Equipment: B-52s.
- Inactivated on: 1 April 1963.

Aircraft and crews reassigned to the 306th Bombardment Wing 1 April 1963 from the 99th Bombardment Wing / 347th Bombardment Squadron at Westover AFB Massachusetts.

=== 4062nd Strategic Wing (Missile) ===
- Activated on: 1 December 1960.
- At: Hill AFB, UT.
- Assigned to: Fifteenth Air Force, 22nd Air Division.
- Equipment: Minuteman I (RAILROAD BASED UNIT).
- Inactivated on: 20 February 1962.

The Unit Never Became OPERATIONAL

=== 4080th Strategic Wing ===
- Redesignated on: 15 June 1960.
- At: Laughlin AFB, TX.
- Reassigned to Second Air Force.
- Moved to: Davis Monthan AFB, AZ on 1 July 1963.
- Equipment: CH-3, AQM-34, U-2, DC-130.
- Reassigned to: Fifteenth Air Force, 12th Strategic Aerospace Division on 12 July 1963.
- Inactivated on: 25 June 1966 and resources absorbed by the 100th Strategic Reconnaissance Wing.

=== 4081st Strategic Wing ===
- Activated on: 1 April 1957.
- At: Ernest Harmon AFB, Newfoundland.
- Assigned to: Eighth Air Force.
- Equipment: KC-97's.
- Reassigned to: Eighth Air Force, 45th Air Division on 1 January 1959.
- Inactivated on: 25 June 1966.

=== 4082d Strategic Wing ===
- Activated on: 1 April 1957.
- At: Goose AB, Newfoundland.
- Assigned to: Eighth Air Force.
- Equipment: B-52s.
- Reassigned to: Eighth Air Force, 45th Air Division on 1 January 1959.
- Inactivated on: 2 October 1966.

=== 4083d Strategic Wing ===
- Activated on: 1 April 1957.
- At: Thule AB, Greenland.
- Assigned to: Eighth Air Force.
- Inactivated on: 1 July 1959.

=== 4123d Strategic Wing "Strength through Unity" ===
+Activated on: 10 December 1957.

- At: Carswell AFB, TX.
- Assigned to: Second Air Force, 19th Air Division.
- Equipment: B-52s KC-135A's.
- Moved to: Clinton – Sherman AFB, OK, on 1 March 1959.
- Reassigned to: Second Air Force, 816th Air Division on 1 March 1959.
- Reassigned to: Second Air Force, 816th Strategic Aerospace Division on 1 April 1962.
- Inactivated on: 1 February 1963.

Replaced by 70th Strategic Reconnaissance Wing (redesignated 70th Bombardment Wing on Activation at Clinton-Sherman AFB) in 1963.

=== 4126th Strategic Wing ===
- Activated on: 3 February 1959
- At: Beale AFB, CA.
- Assigned to: Fifteenth Air Force, 14th Air Division.
- Equipment: B-52s, KC-135's.
- Changed equipment in: 1961 to B-52s, KC-135's, Titan Is.
- Reassigned to: Fifteenth Air Force, 14th Strategic Aerospace Division on 1 March 1962.
- Inactivated on: 1 February 1963.

Replaced by 456th Strategic Aerospace Wing in 1962.

=== 4128th Strategic Wing ===
- Activated on: 5 January 1959.
- At: Amarillo AFB, TX.
- Assigned to: Fifteenth Air Force, 47th Air Division.
- Equipment: B-52s, KC-135's.
- Reassigned to: Fifteenth Air Force, 810th Air Division on 1 July 1959.
- Reassigned to: Fifteenth Air Force, 810th Strategic Aerospace Division on 1 November 1962
- Inactivated on: 1 February 1963.

Resources absorbed by 461st Bombardment Wing in 1963.

=== 4130th Strategic Wing ===
- Activated on: 1 October 1958.
- At: Bergstrom AFB, TX.
- Assigned to: Second Air Force, 19th Air Division.
- Equipment: B-52s and KC-135s.
- Reassigned to: Second Air Force, 4th Air Division on 1 July 1963.
- Inactivated on: 1 September 1963.

Resources absorbed by 340th Bombardment Wing in 1963.

=== 4133d Strategic Wing ===
- Activated on: 1 September 1958.
- At: Grand Forks AFB, ND.
- Assigned to: Fifteenth Air Force.
- Equipment: B-52s KC-135A's.
- Reassigned to: Fifteenth Air Force, 821st Air Division on 1 January 1959.
- Reassigned to: Fifteenth Air Force, 821st Strategic Air Division on 1 February 1962.
- Reassigned to: Fifteenth Air Force, 810th Air Division on 1 July 1962.
- Inactivated on: 1 February 1963.

Replaced by 319th Bombardment Wing in 1963.

=== 4134th Strategic Wing ===
- Activated on: 1 May 1958.
- At: Mather AFB, CA.
- Assigned to: Fifteenth Air Force, 14th Air Division
- Equipment: B-52s KC-135A's.
- Inactivated on: 1 February 1963.

Replaced by 320th Bombardment Wing in 1963.

=== 4135th Strategic Wing ===
- Activated on: 1 December 1958.
- At: Eglin AFB, FL.
- Assigned to: Second Air Force.
- Equipment: B-52s.
- Reassigned to: Eighth Air Force, 822nd Air Division on 1 January 1959.
- Inactivated on: 1 February 1963.

Replaced by 39th Bombardment Wing in 1963.

=== 4136th Strategic Wing ===
- Activated on: 1 September 1958.
- At: Minot AFB, ND.
- Assigned to: Fifteenth Air Force.
- Equipment: B-52s.
- Reassigned to: Fifteenth Air Force, 821st Air Division on 1 January 1959.
- Reassigned to: Fifteenth Air Force, 810th Air Division on 1 July 1962.
- Reassigned to: Fifteenth Air Force, 810th Strategic Aerospace Division on 1 November 1962.
- Inactivated on: 1 February 1963.

Replaced by 450th Bombardment Wing in 1963.

=== 4137th Strategic Wing ===
- Activated on: 1 July 1959.
- At: Robins AFB, GA.
- Assigned to: Eighth Air Force, 822nd Air Division.
- Equipment: B-52s KC-135A's.
- Inactivated on: 1 February 1963.

Replaced by 465th Bombardment Wing in 1963.

=== 4138th Strategic Wing ===
- Activated on: 1 January 1959.
- At: Turner AFB, GA.
- Assigned to: Eighth Air Force, 822nd Air Division.
- Equipment: B-52s KC-135A's.
- Inactivated on: 1 February 1963.

Replaced by the 484th Bombardment Wing.

=== 4141st Strategic Wing "Peace Through Power" ===
- Activated on: 1 September 1958.
- At: Glasgow AFB, MT.
- Assigned to: Fifteenth Air Force.
- Equipment: B-52s KC-135A's.
- Reassigned to: Fifteenth Air Force, 821st Air Division on 1 July 1959.
- Reassigned to: Fifteenth Air Force, 821st Strategic Aerospace Division on 15 February 1962.
- Reassigned to: Fifteenth Air Force, 810th Air Division on 1 July 1962.
- Reassigned to: Fifteenth Air Force, 810th Strategic Aerospace Division on 1 April 1962.
- Inactivated on: 1 February 1963.

Replaced by the 91st Bombardment Wing.

=== 4157th Strategic Wing ===
- Activated on: 1 July 1962.
- At: Eielson AFB, AK
- Assigned to: Fifteenth Air Force.
- Equipment: B-47's, B-52s, KC-97's, KC-135A's, RC-135E, RC-135S (with J-57 Engines), RC-135D's.
- Reassigned to: Fifteenth Air Force, 18th Strategic Aerospace Division on 1 July 1965.
- Inactivated on: 25 March 1967.
  - Detachment 1
  - Located at: Shemya Air Force Base

Resources absorbed by 6th Strategic Wing on 25 March 1967.

=== 4158th Strategic Wing ===
- Activated on: 1 November 1963.
- At: Elmendorf AFB, AK
- Assigned to: Fifteenth Air Force.
- Equipment: B-47's, KC-97's.
- Reassigned in: Fifteenth Air Force, 18th Strategic Aerospace Division on 1 July 1965.
- Inactivated on: 25 June 1966.

=== 4170th Strategic Wing ===
- Activated on: 1 July 1959.
- At: Larson AFB, WA.
- Assigned to: Fifteenth Air Force, 18th Air Division.
- Equipment: B-52s, KC-135A's, Titan I's.
- Inactivated on: 1 February 1963.

Replaced by the 462nd Strategic Aerospace Wing.

=== 4228th Strategic Wing ===
- Activated on: 1 July 1958.
- At: Columbus AFB, MS.
- Assigned to: Second Air Force, 4th Air Division.
- Equipment: B-52s, KC-135A's.
- Inactivated on: 1 February 1963.

Replaced by the 454th Bombardment Wing.

=== 4238th Strategic Wing ===
- Activated on: 1 March 1958
- At: Barksdale AFB, LA.
- Assigned to: Second Air Force, 4th Air Division.
- Equipment: B-52s, KC-135A's.
- Inactivated on: 1 April 1963

Replaced by 2nd Bombardment Wing in 1963.

=== 4239th Strategic Wing "First Always" ===
- Activated on: 1 July 1956.
- At: Kincheloe AFB, MI.
- Assigned to: Second Air Force, 40th Air Division
- Equipment: B-52s, KC-135A's.
- Inactivated on: 1 February 1963.

Replaced by 449th Bombardment Wing in 1963.

=== 4241st Strategic Wing ===
- Activated on: 1 October 1958.
- At: Seymour Johnson AFB, NC.
- Assigned to: Second Air Force.
- Equipment: B-52s, KC-135A's.
- Reassigned to: Eighth Air Force, 822nd Air Division on 1 January 1959.
- Inactivated on: 15 April 1963.

Resources absorbed by 68th Bombardment Wing in 1963.

=== 4245th Strategic Wing ===
- Activated on: 5 January 1959.
- At: Sheppard AFB, TX.
- Assigned to: Second Air Force, 816th Air Division.
- Reassigned to: Second Air Force, 816th Strategic Aerospace Division on 1 April 1962.
- Equipment: B-52s, KC-135A's.
- Inactivated on: 1 February 1963.

Resources absorbed by 494th Bombardment Wing in 1963.

=== 4252d Strategic Wing ===
- Activated on: 12 January 1965.
- At: Kadena AFB, Okinawa.
- Assigned to: Strategic Air Command, 3rd Air Division.
- Equipment: B-52s, KC-135A's.
- Inactivated on: 31 March 1970.

Resources absorbed by 376th Strategic Wing in 1970.

=== 4258th Strategic Wing ===
- Activated on: 2 June 1966.
- At: U-Tapao, Thailand.
- Assigned to: Strategic Air Command.
- Equipment: B-52, KC-135s.
- Inactivated on: 31 March 1970.

Replaced by the 307th Strategic Wing in 1970

=== 4320th Strategic Wing (Missile) ===
- Organized on: 1 February 1958.
- At: Francis E. Warren AFB, WY.
- Assigned to: Strategic Air Command, 1st Missile Division.
- Discontinued on: 12 February 1958.
- Replaced Strategic Missile Wing (Provisional) of Air Research and Development Command. Replaced by 706th Strategic Missile Wing

=== 4321st Strategic Wing ===
- Activated on: 1 October 1959.
- At: Offutt AFB, NE.
- Assigned to: Second Air Force, 17th Air Division.
- Reassigned to: Second Air Force, 818th Strategic Aerospace Division on 15 August 1962
- Inactivated on: 1 January 1963

Replaced by 385th Strategic Aerospace Wing on 15 November 1962.

== See also ==
- Strategic Air Command wings
