= List of MAJCOM wings of the United States Air Force =

Seal of the Department of the Air Force

This is a list of major air command (MAJCOM) wings of the United States Air Force (USAF), a designation system in use from the summer of 1948 to the mid-1990s. From 1948 to 1991 MAJCOMs had the authority to form wings using manpower authorizations under their control. Each MAJCOM or other organization reporting directly to the USAF was assigned a block of four digit numbers to use for units it organized. The system terminated in 1991 when the USAF assumed control of all units except for provisional ones.

While the majority of the wings on the list were support units, combat commands could (and did) create combat units on their own as shown below.

== Background ==
=== Army Air Force Base Units ===
In 1944, the Army Air Forces (AAF) faced a problem with its units in the United States. At the time, most AAF units were involved with training and preparing individuals and units for deployment to combat theaters or with meeting the logistics requirements of overseas units. Standard military units, based on relatively inflexible tables of organization, were proving to be poorly adapted to this mission. Accordingly, the AAF adopted a more functional system in which each base was organized into a separate numbered unit. Under this system, each command reporting to the AAF was given a bulk allotment of manpower and then received the flexibility to form units to carry out its mission by "customizing" the units on each station. AAF commands then organized their manpower into numbered "AAF Base Units." To prevent duplication, commands were allotted blocks of numbers to use when organizing their units, ranging from 100-199 for First Air Force to 4000-4999 for Air Technical Service Command. When the United States Air Force (USAF) became a separate service, the AAF Base Units became AF Base Units.

=== Wing Base Organization ===
In August 1947, the AAF began a service test of the wing base organization model. This test was limited to combat wings, and unified the combat group and all support elements on a base under a single wing, which carried the same number as the combat group. The test proved the wing base plan to the satisfaction of the new USAF and was implemented in all combat commands in the summer of 1948. The success of the plan also led to its implementation in support commands and the support units of combat commands as well. Beginning in the late spring of 1948 AF Base Units were replaced by wings, groups, and squadrons. By July 1948 Headquarters, USAF began to allot blocks of numbers to its major subordinate formations, the Major Commands (MAJCOMs), in the same way that it had allotted blocks for AF Base Units. Because the new units controlled by MAJCOMs would be wings, groups, and squadrons, just like those controlled by Headquarters, USAF, the allotted blocks began at 1100, and numbers below 1000 were reserved for USAF use. Numbers originally ranged from 1100-1199 for Bolling Field Command to 4900-4999 (Note: This may be a typo in Ravenstein, because overseas commands used numbers between 5000 and 7599 as early as July 1948 as shown in Fletcher, page 151.) for Special Weapons Command. Eventually, the numbers were expanded as high as 9999 for Continental Air Command reserve units. (Note: The highest numbered unit was the 9999th Air Reserve Squadron, which was composed of members of the United States Senate and House of Representatives who were also members of the Air Force Reserve.)

== MAJCOM wings ==
The term used by USAF to denote wings (and other units) controlled by MAJCOMs varied during the first decade the system was used. Originally, they were called Table of Distribution (T/D) Units. (Note: This term contrasted them with Table of Organization Units controlled by Hq, USAF.) Later they were referred to as Designated Units. (Note: This term contrasted them with Constituted Units controlled by Hq, USAF.) From the late 1950s the accepted term was MAJCON (from Major Command Controlled) Units, while units controlled by Hq USAF were called AFCON (Air Force Controlled) Units. All provisional units were MAJCON units. Although Headquarters, USAF occasionally authorized MAJCOMs to number provisional wings outside the blocks of numbers allotted to the commands, only four digit provisional wings are included in this list. Provisional wings numbered outside the four digit system, such as the Strategic Wing, Provisional 72d at Andersen AFB during the Vietnam War or the Bombardment Wing, Provisional, 806th at RAF Fairford during Operation Desert Storm are not included in the list.

Under the USAF organization and lineage system MAJCON units' lineages (histories, awards, and battle honors) ended when the units were discontinued and could never be revived. USAF considered MAJCON wings "temporary", though many stayed in existence for a very long time. (Note: e.g. The 88th Air Base Wing (the 2750th Air Base Wing when it was a MAJCON wing) has been active continuously since 1944.) Some MAJCON wings appear to have been revived, but even when they have the same number and name, USAF regards them as two entirely separate units, as shown in the two entries for the 1500th Air Base Wing in the list.

Although USAF policy during this era stated MAJCON units could not be reactivated, when the MAJCON system was being ended in 1991–1992, numerous MAJCON units were converted to AFCON units and assigned two or three digit numbers. Also, since 1991, discontinued MAJCON units have been reestablished and "consolidated" (merged) with AFCON units. Other former MAJCON units have been revived as AFCON units.

== Conversion of MAJCON Wings to AFCON Wings ==
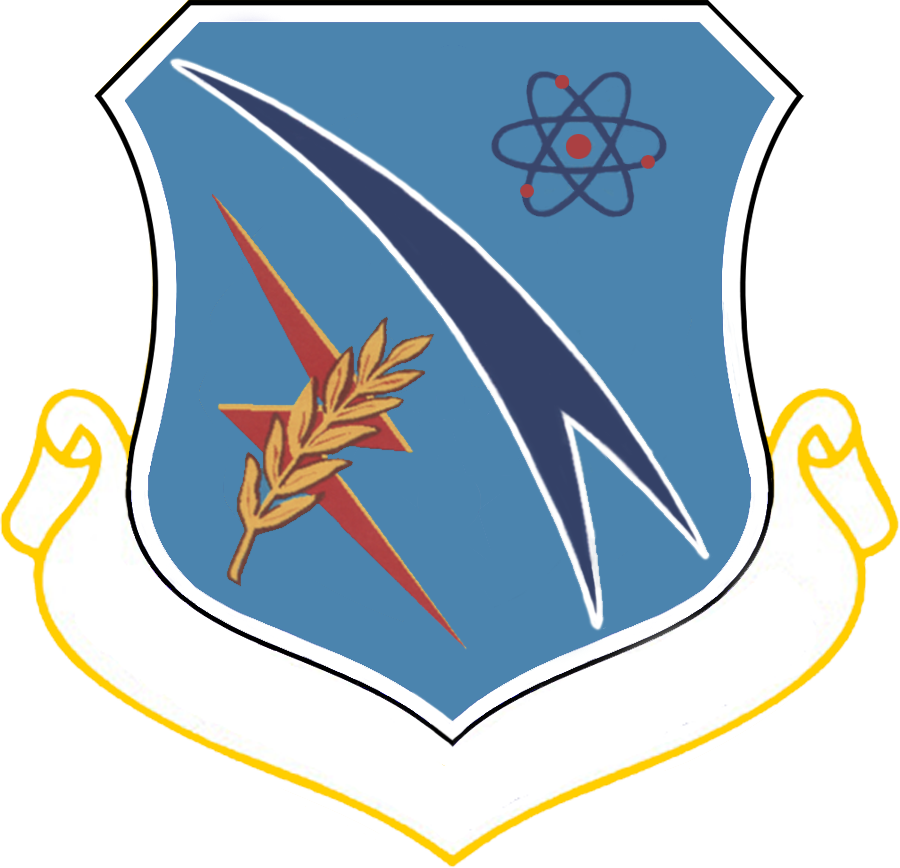
Emblem of the 4126th Strategic Wing adopted by the 456th Strategic Aerospace Wing

During the period covered by this list, there were several occasions when Major Commands received approval from the Department of the Air Force to replace MAJCON Wings under their control with AFCON Wings. One reason for these changes was to retain the lineage of existing combat units or to revive and perpetuate the lineage of inactive units with illustrious combat records. In 1963 SAC discontinued its Air Refueling Wings and Strategic Wings equipped with combat aircraft and replaced them with AFCON units. ADC had acted similarly in 1955 with Project Arrow, which was designed to bring back on the active list fighter units which had compiled memorable records in the two world wars, although Project Arrow involved groups and squadrons, not wings.

On occasion, Hq, USAF provided that an AFCON Wing replacing a MAJCON Wing inherited the honors, but not the history, of the wing being replaced. For example, when the 320th Bombardment Wing and the 456th Strategic Aerospace Wing replaced the 4134th Strategic Wing and the 4126th Strategic Wing in 1963, they inherited honors (not lineage) from the MAJCON wings they replaced. This inheritance occurred because SAC was aware of the historical significance of the accomplishments of the Strategic Wings and the need to perpetuate this lineage as well as the lineage of illustrious units that were no longer active. In practice, this inheritance of honors has been limited to the adoption of emblems. While the 320th decided to use the emblem approved for it earlier, the 456th chose to replace the emblem approved for it when it was a troop carrier wing with the emblem of the 4126th.

=== FEAF Tactical Support Wings ===
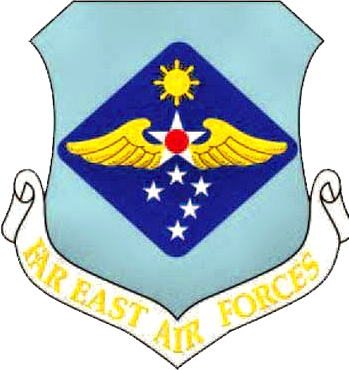
Far East Air Forces emblem

In July 1950, USAF planners did not foresee that the Korean War would be of long duration. Consequently, when it came time for Far East Air Forces to deploy tactical units to Korea, it retained its permanent wings in Japan since they were heavily committed to the air defense of Japan. However, by the following month, it became apparent that the Air Base Squadrons originally deployed to Korea to support tactical units did not have sufficient personnel and equipment. Therefore, five Tactical Support Wings were organized for operational control of the tactical groups in Korea. This proved a temporary expedient, and at the start of December 1950 the permanent wings were deployed to Korea to control their tactical groups already located there, replacing the existing Tactical Support Wings.

=== SAC Strategic and Air Refueling Wings ===
Strategic Air Command emblem

When the Boeing B-52 Stratofortress dispersal program began in the late 1950s, the new SAC units created to support this program were MAJCON Strategic Wings and given four-digit designations. Although these wings were MAJCON units, typically each included a Bombardment Squadron, an Air Refueling Squadron, and a Munitions Maintenance Squadron, all of which were AFCON units. Some also included an AFCON Strategic Missile Squadron. (Note: For example, the 4126th Strategic Wing included the 31st Bombardment Squadron, 63d Munitions Maintenance Squadron, 851st Strategic Missile Squadron, and 903d Air Refueling Squadron in addition to MAJCON support units.) SAC also used the strategic wing concept for the command of forward-deployed (Operation Reflex) Boeing B-47 Stratojet and Boeing KC-97 Stratofreighter units. SAC also had several MAJCON air refueling wings whose flying squadrons were AFCON units.

The reorganization process, which took place between January and September 1963, applied to 22 B-52 Strategic Wings, three Air Refueling Wings, and the 4321st Strategic Wing at Offutt Air Force Base, Nebraska, which had a strategic missile squadron assigned. "These units were discontinued and two and three-digit AFCON units were activated. In most cases, the bombardment squadron[s] that had been assigned to the strategic wings were inactivated and bombardment squadrons that had previously been assigned to the newly-activated wings were activated. While these actions were almost tantamount to redesignation, they were not official redesignations." Overseas strategic wings, which had AFCON units attached for operational control, but not assigned, did not convert to AFCON wings until 1966. (Note: e.g. the 95th Strategic Wing replaced the 4082d Strategic Wing. Ravenstein, Combat Wings, p. 134.)

=== MATS Air Transport Wings ===
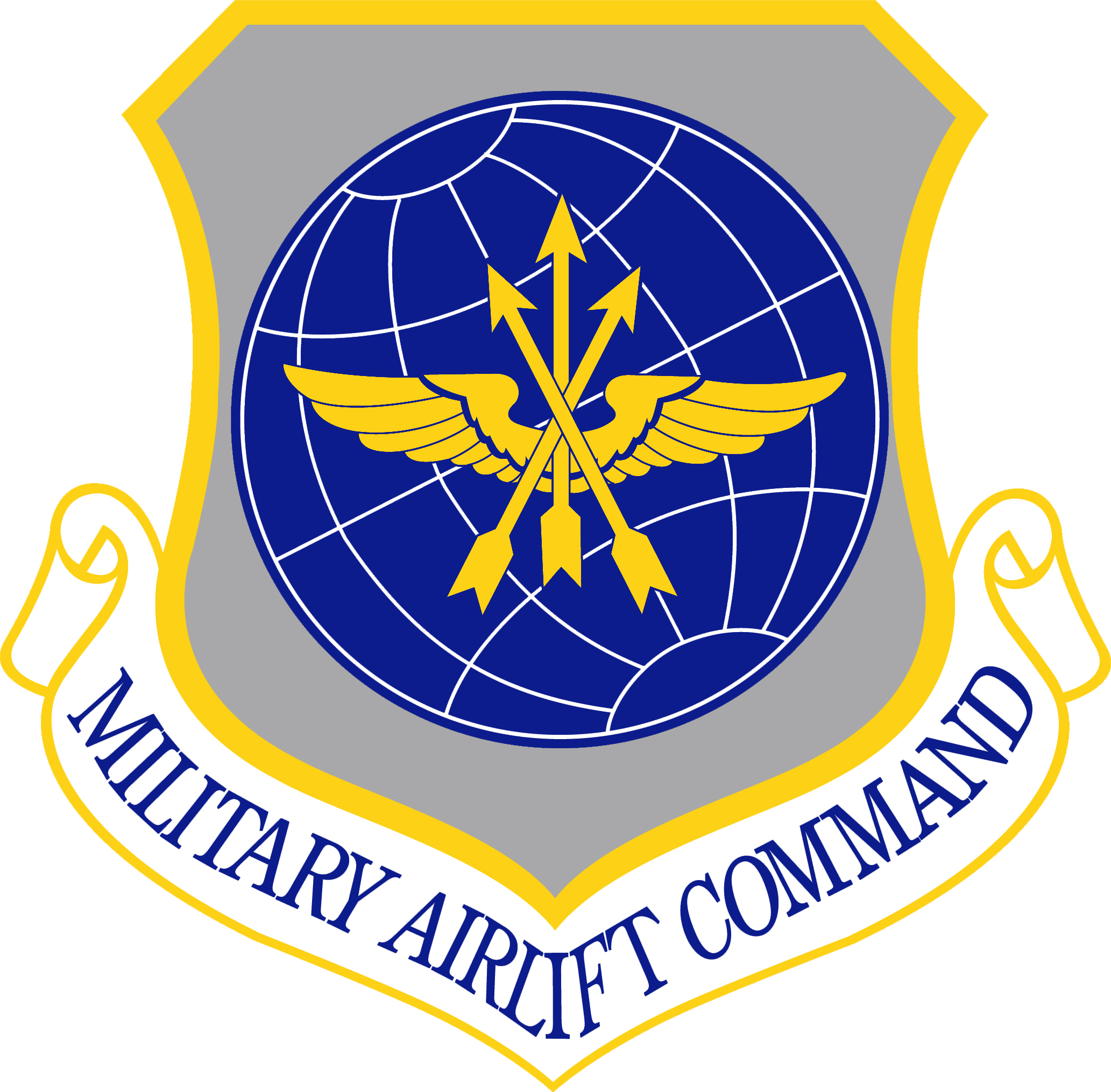
Military Airlift Command emblem

When the MAJCON system was established in 1948 strategic airlift and tactical airlift were treated differently. Tactical airlift (called troop carrier) units operated within a theater of operations and were considered AFCON combat units. Strategic airlift (called air transport) units operated mostly outside theaters of operations and were considered support units. As support units, they were MAJCON units. All air transport wings were assigned to Military Air Transport Service (MATS) and numbered within the block of 1250 to 1750. In 1952, however, MATS MAJCON air transport squadrons were replaced by AFCON Squadrons. (Note: e.g. The 3d Air Transport Squadron replaced the 1258th Air Transport Squadron."Factsheet 3 Airlift Squadron". Air Force Historical Research Agency. 2 January 2008. Archived from the original on 6 January 2011.) By being MAJCON wings with AFCON squadrons assigned, MATS air transport wings resembled SAC strategic wings. In January 1966, MATS was replaced by Military Airlift Command and its seven existing MAJCON Air Transport Wings were replaced by AFCON Military Airlift Wings. (Note: e.g. The 436th Military Airlift Wing replaced the 1607th Air Transport Wing and adopted its emblem, Ravenstein, pp. 232-233.)

=== Flying Training Wings ===
Tactical Air Command emblem

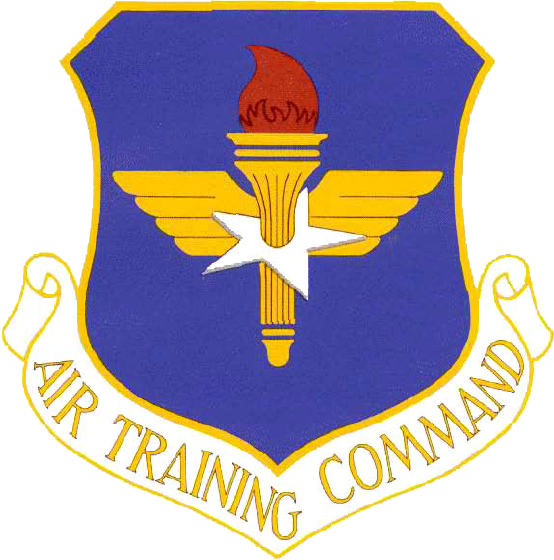
Air Training Command emblem

The Air Force considered all training units support units. Although they were assigned the mission of advanced training, combat crew training wings operated the same kinds of aircraft as combat wings and retained a capability to augment combat forces. SAC's 93d Bombardment Wing and MAC's 443d Military Airlift Wing were AFCON units conducting the same crew training mission for bombardment, air refueling, and airlift. In October 1969, Tactical Air Command (TAC) joined them and replaced its MAJCON combat crew training wings for fighter and reconnaissance aircraft with AFCON fighter training wings. (Note: Reconnaissance training was already under the aegis of the 363d Tactical Reconnaissance Wing, whose subordinate training squadrons were involved in the MAJCON to AFCON conversion.)

The final conversion of MAJCON to AFCON wings occurred between 1972 and 1973. The remaining MAJCON flying training units in the Air Force were assigned to Air Training Command (ATC). ATC followed TAC's example and replaced its MAJCON pilot training wings and navigator training wing with AFCON flying training wings.

== End of the MAJCOM system ==
During the Gulf War of 1990-91 MAJCON wings, such as the 7440th Composite Wing (Provisional) at Incirlik Air Base, Turkey, and the 801st Bomb Wing (Provisional) (Note: During both the Viet Nam War and Desert Storm, SAC obtained permission to number some of its MAJCON provisional units with three digits) at Morón Air Base, Spain served alongside AFCON wings. The MAJCON system was in existence up until 30 April 1991, when all units became AFCON units. A number of MAJCOM wings were converted to AFCON status while retaining their four digit designation or redesignated with one to three digits.

"At the same time, the Air Force withdrew the authorization for major commands to create MAJCON organizations. Those four digit organizations active on 30 April 1991, changed to organizations under the direct control of Headquarters USAF for organizational actions, eliminating all MAJCON organizations. Among the former MAJCON organizations were about twenty active four-digit wings. Within a few years, however all those wings were inactivated, consolidated with, or replaced by lower numbered wings." An example is the 4404th Wing in Saudi Arabia, which was only replaced by a three-digit AFCON wing, the 363d Air Expeditionary Wing, on 1 December 1998.

Four digit wings are still permitted if they are provisional organizations, although the wing number is based on the unit's area of responsibility, not the command it is assigned to. However, most USAF provisional units are now expeditionary units. Although expeditionary wings are activated as needed by MAJCOMs, their numbers are controlled by Hq, USAF and their lineage and honors can be inherited.

== List of MAJCOM Wings ==
Wing	Location	MAJCOM	Organized	Discontinued /Moved	Remarks	Ref
1001st Air Base Wing; 1001st Composite Wing	Andrews AFB, MD	HQC	1 Oct 1957; 1 Jul 1968	1 Jul 1968; 1 Jul 1969	Was 1401st ABW. Replaced by 1st Composite Wing.	
Medical Services Wing, Provisional, 1010th	Andrews AFB, MD	HQC	15 Oct 1962	Unknown		
1020th USAF Special Activities Wing	Bolling AFB, DC; Fort Myer, VA	HQC	26 May 1949; 30 Jul 1949	30 Jul 1949 c. 30 Jun 1963	Mission Absorbed by 1100th ABW.	
1050th Air Base Wing	Andrews AFB, MD	HQC	1 Apr 1949	26 Aug 1952	Redesignated 1401st ABW.	
1090th USAF Special Reporting Wing	Sandia Base, NM	USAF	c. May 1951	c. 2 Nov 1964	Was USAF Special Reporting Agency.	
1100th Air Base Wing	Bolling AFB, DC	HQC	16 Mar 1949	30 Sep 1977	Replaced by 1100th ABG.	
1100th Air Base Wing	Bolling AFB, DC	MAC	15 Dec 1980	1 Oct 1985	Transferred to Air Force District of Washington as 1100th ABG.	
1140th USAF Special Reporting Wing	Sandia Base, NM	USAFSRA	c. 28 Aug 1948	Unknown	Redesignated 1100th USAF Special Reporting Group.	
1254th Air Transport Wing	Washington Natl Apt, VA; Andrews AFB. MD	MATS	1 Dec 1960 10 Jul 1961	10 Jul 1961 8 Jan 1966	Was 1254th Air Transport Group. Replaced by 89th Military Airlift Wing	
1300th Air Base Wing	Great Falls AFB, MT	MATS	1 May 1953	1 Feb 1954	Replaced 1701st ABG. Replaced by 407th ABG.	
1370th Photographic Mapping Wing	Turner AFB, GA; Forbes AFB, KS	MATS	1 Jan 1960; May 1967	May 1967; Oct 1968	Was 1370th Photo Mapping Group. Replaced by Aerospace Cartographic and Geodetic Service.	
1400th Air Base Wing	Scott AFB, IL	MATS	8 Sep 1968	1 Jun 1973	Replaced 375th ABG. Replaced by 375th ABG.	
1401st Air Base Wing	Andrews AFB, MD	MATS	26 Aug 1952	1 Oct 57	Was 1050th ABW. Redesignated 1001st ABW.	
1405th Air Base Wing	Scott AFB, IL	MATS	1 Oct 1957	12 Jan 1966	Was 3310th Technical Training Wing. Replaced by 375th ABG.	
1500th Air Base Wing	Hickam AFB, HI	MATS	13 Jun 1949	20 Jul 1949	Redesignated 1506th ABW.	
1500th Air Transport Wing; 1500th Air Base Wing	Hickam AFB, HI	MATS	1 Jun 1949; 27 May 1952	27 May 1952; 15 Oct 1954	Transferred to FEAF as 6486th ABW.	
Strategic Wing, Provisional, 1500th	Andersen AFB, Guam	SAC	21 Sep 1990	c. 11 Dec 1990		
1501st Air Transport Wing	Travis AFB, CA	MATS	1 Oct 1948; 1 Jul 1952	1 Jan 1950; 8 Jan 1966	Was 530th Air Transport Wing. 1704th Air Transport Wing 1950–1952. Replaced by 60th Military Airlift Wing	
1502d Air Transport Wing	Hickam AFB, HI	MATS	1 Jul 1955	8 Jan 1966	Replaced by 61st Military Airlift Wing.	
1503d Air Transport Wing	Haneda Airport, Japan; Tachikawa AB, Japan	MATS	1 Oct 1948; 15 Jul 1957	15 Jul 1957; 22 Jun 1964	Was 540th Air Transport Wing. Replaced by 1503d Air Transport Group.	
1506th Air Base Wing	Hickam AFB, HI	MATS	20 Jul 1949	2 Aug 1949	Was 1500th Air Base Wing	
1550th Aircrew Training and Test Wing; 1550th Combat Crew Training Wing	Hill AFB, UT; Kirtland AFB, NM	MAC	1 Apr 1971; 15 Mar 1976	15 Mar 1976; 1 Oct 1991	Redesignated 1985. Consolidated with 92d Combat Bombardment Wing as 542d Crew Training Wing	
1600th Air Transport Wing; 1600th Air Base Wing	Westover AFB, MA	MATS	1 Oct 1948 1 Jul 1953	1 Jul 1953 1 Apr 1955	Was 520th Air Transport Wing. Support units transferred to 4050th ABG when base transferred to SAC.	
1602d Air Transport Wing	Wiesbaden AB; Fürstenfeldbruck AB; Chateauroux AS	MATS	1 Oct 1948 c. 25 Jun 1953; 1956	c. 25 Jun 1953; 1956; 1 Jul 1964	Was 525th Air Transport Wing. Units transferred to 322d Air Division.	
1603d Air Transport Wing	Wheelus Field, Libya	MATS	16 Oct 1951	1 Jan 1953	Was 1603d ABG. Transferred to USAFE and redesignated 7272 ABW.	
1604th Air Base Wing	Kindley AFB, Bermuda	MATS	c. 1 Jul 1955	1 Nov 1964	Was 1604th ABG. Redesignated 1604th Air Base Group.	
1605th Air Base Wing	Lajes Field, Azores	MATS	1 Feb 1953; 1 Jan 1975	1 Nov 1967; 1 Jan 1982	Was 1605th ABG. 1605th ABG, Nov 1967-Jan 1975. Replaced by 1605th ABG.	
1605th Military Airlift Support Wing	Lajes Field, Azores	MAC	1 Jan 1982	27 Jan 1992	Replaced 1605th Air Base Wing. Redesignated 65th Support Wing	
1606th Air Base Wing	Kirtland AFB, NM	MAC	1 Jul 1977	1 Oct 1991	Was 4900th Air Base Wing. Consolidated with 542d Air Service Group as 542d Support Group.	
1607th Air Transport Wing	Dover AFB, DE	MATS	1 Jan 1954	8 Jan 1966	Replaced by 436th Military Airlift Wing	
1608th Air Transport Wing	Charleston AFB, SC	MATS	1 Mar 1955	8 Jan 1966	Replaced by 437th Military Airlift Wing.	
1611th Air Transport Wing	McGuire AFB, NJ	MATS	1 May 1954	8 Jan 1966	Support units replaced 568th Air Defense Group. Replaced by 438th Military Airlift Wing	
Tactical Airlift Wing, Provisional, 1620th	Bateen Airport, UAE	MAC	c. 16 Aug 1990	c. 31 Mar 1991	Operation Desert Storm.	
Tactical Airlift Wing, Provisional, 1630th	Al Ain IAP, UAE	MAC	1 Nov 1990	c. 11 Apr 1991	Operation Desert Storm. Replaced 435th Tactical Airlift Wing, Deployed.	
1640th Air Base Wing	Ramey AFB, Puerto Rico	MAC	1 Jul 1971	31 Jul 1973	Replaced 72d Air Base Group. Base closed.	
Tactical Airlift Wing, Provisional, 1640th	Marsirah AB, Oman	MAC	c. 1 Dec 1990	c. 12 Apr 1991	Operation Desert Storm.	
Tactical Airlift Wing, Provisional, 1650th	Al Dhafra AB, UAE	MATS	c. 9 Oct 1990	c. 7 Apr 1991	Operation Desert Storm.	
Tactical Airlift Wing, Provisional, 1660th	RAFO Thumrait, Oman	MATS	c. 26 Dec 1990	c. 5 May 1991	Operation Desert Storm. Replaced 317th Tactical Airlift Wing, Deployed(?).	
Air Refueling Wing, Provisional, 1700th	Taif AB, Saudi Arabia	MAC	1990	c. 31 Mar 1991	Operation Desert Storm	
1700th Air Transport Wing	Kelly AFB, TX	MATS	1 Oct 1948	18 Dec 1957	Discontinued.	
1701st Air Transport Wing	Great Falls AFB, MT	MATS	1 Oct 1948	1 May 1953	Was 517th Air Transport Wing. Support units transferred to 1300th ABW.	
Air Refueling Wing, Provisional, 1702d	Seeb AB, Oman	MAC	21 Sep 1990	c. 8 Mar 1991	Operation Desert Storm.	
Air Refueling Wing, Provisional, 1703d	King Khalid IAP, Saudi Arabia	MAC	1990	c. 10 Mar 1991	Operation Desert Storm.	
1704th Air Transport Wing	Travis AFB, CA	MATS	24 Aug 1950	1 Jul 1952	Was 1501st Air Transport Wing. Redesignated 1501st Air Transport Wing	
1705th Air Transport Wing	McChord AFB, WA	MATS	1 Jan 1950	1 Jul 1952	Operational units transferred to Continental Division, MATS	
Air Refueling Wing, Provisional, 1706th	Cairo West Apt, Egypt	MAC	1990	c. 24 May 1991	Operation Desert Storm.	
1707 Air Base Wing; 1707th Air Transport Wing (Training)	Palm Beach AFB, FL; Tinker AFB, OK	MATS	1 Sep 1951; 1 Jun 1959	1 Jun 1959; 8 Jan 1966	Redesignated 1 May 1954. Replaced by 443d Military Airlift Wing	
Air Refueling Wing, Provisional, 1707th	Masirah AB, Oman	MAC	1990	1991	Operation Desert Storm.	
1708th Ferrying Wing	Kelly AFB, TX	MATS	20 Octr 1955	1 Mar 1958	Was 1708th Ferrying Group. Discontinued.	
Air Refueling Wing, Provisional, 1709th	King Abdulaziz Apt, Saudi Arabia	MAC	1990	c. 14 Mar 1991	Operation Desert Storm.	
Air Refueling Wing, Provisional, 1711th	King Khalid IAP, Saudi Arabia	MAC	1990	Mar 1991	Operation Desert Storm.	
Air Refueling Wing, Provisional, 1712th	Al Minhad AB, UAE	MAC	c. 20 Dec 1990	c. 14 Mar 1991	Operation Desert Storm.	
Air Refueling Wing, Provisional, 1713th	Dubai IAP, UAE	MAC	1990	Mar 1991	Operation Desert Storm.	
1776th Air Base Wing	Andrews AFB, MD	MAC	15 Dec 1980	12 Jul 1991	Replaced 76th Air Base Group. Replaced by 89th Support Group	
1800th AACS Wing	Langley AFB, VA; Tinker AFB, OK	MATS	1 Oct 1948; 10 Mar 49	10 Mar 49; 1 Nov 1957	Was 1st AACS Wing. Redesignated Continental AACS Area	
1800th Information Systems Wing; 1800th Communications Wing	Fort Myer, VA; The Pentagon, VA	AFCC	1 Feb 1986; 8 Jul 1989	8 Jul 1989 c. 1992	Redesignated 1 Nov 1986.	
1804th AACS Wing	Elmendorf AFB, AK	MATS	1 Oct 1953	1 Nov 1957	Was 1804th AACS Group. Redesignated Alaskan AACS Region.	
1805th AACS Wing	Pepperell AFB, Canada	MATS	1 Oct 1953	1 Nov 1957	Was 1805th AACS Group. Redesignated North Atlantic AACS Region.	
1807th AACS Wing	Wiesbaden Mil Post; Fürstenfeldbruck AB; Bitburg AB, Germany	MATS	1 Oct 1948; 26 Jun 1953; 15 Nov 55	26 Jun 1953; 15 Nov 55; 1 Nov 1957	Was 5th AACS Wing. Redesignated Europe Africa Middle East AACS Area.	
1808th AACS Wing	Tokyo; Fuchu AS, Japan; Wheeler AFB, HI	MATS	1 Oct 1948; 15 May 1956; 19 Jan 1957	15 May 1956; 19 Jan 1957; 1 Novr 1957	Was 7th AACS Wing. Redesignated Pacific AACS Area.	
1840th Air Base Wing	Richards-Gebaur AFB, MO	AFCS	1 Jul 1970	1 Oct 1977	Replaced 4676th ABG when base transferred from ADC. Transferred to MAC as 1607th ABG.	
1931st Information Systems Wing; 1931st Communications Wing	Elmendorf AFB, AK	AFCC	1 Jul 1984; 1 Nov 1986	1 Nov 1986; 1 Oct 1990	Was 1931st Communications Group. Redesignated 1931st Communications Group.	
1989th Information Systems Wing; 1989th Communications Wing	Torrejon AB, Spain	AFCC	4 Jan 1985; 1 Nov 1986	1 Nov 1986; 16 Aug 1989	Discontinued.	
2005th Information Systems Wing; 2005th Communications Wing	Sembach AB, Germany	AFCC	4 Jan 1985; 1 Nov 1986	1 Nov 1986 c. 31 Mar 1993	Was 2005th Information Systems Group. Redesignated 601st Communications Group.	
2043d Air Weather Wing	Tokyo, Japan	MATS	1 Oct 1948	1 Jan 1949	Was 43d Weather Wing. Redesignated 2143d Air Weather Wing.	
2058th Air Weather Wing	Wiesbaden AB, Germany; Fürstenfeldbruck AB, Germany	MATS	12 Oct 1951; 25 Jun 1953	25 Jun 1953; 8 Feb 1954	Was 2105th Air Weather Group. Replaced by 2d Weather Wing.	
2059th Air Weather Wing	Tinker AFB, OK	MATS	1 Oct 1948	1 Jun 1952	Was 59th Weather Wing. Discontinued.	
2143d Air Weather Wing	Tokyo, Japan	MATS	1 Jan 1949	8 Feb 1954	Was 2043d Air Weather Wing. Replaced by 1st Weather Wing.	
2147th Information Systems Wing; 2147th Communications Wing	RAF Mildenhall, UK	AFCC	4 Jan 1985; 1 Nov 1986	1 Nov 1986 c. 1 Feb 1992	Was 2147th Information Systems Group. Redesignated 100th Communications Group.	
2349th Air Base Wing	Parks AFB, CA	CONAC	1 Jan 1957	c. 1 Jan 1958	Was 3275 Basic Military Training Wing. Redesignated 2349 ABG.	
2477th Air Reserve Training Wing	Vancouver Barracks, WA	CONAC	c. 1 Jul 1958	1 September 1960	Replaced by 2477th Air Force Reserve Sector.	
2478th Air Reserve Training Wing	Long Beach IAP, CA	CONAC	c. 5 May 1958	1 September 1960	Replaced by 2478th Air Force Reserve Sector.	
2479th Air Reserve Training Wing	Fort Miley, CA	CONAC	c. 8 May 1958	1 Sep 1960	Replaced by 2479th Air Force Reserve Sector.	
2480th Air Reserve Training Wing	Detroit, MI; O'Hare IAP, IL	CONAC	14 May 1958 c. 1 Jul 1959	c. 1 Jul 1959; 1 Sep 1960	Replaced by 2480th Air Force Reserve Sector.	
2481st Air Reserve Training Wing	Minneapolis-St Paul IAP, MN	CONAC	Unknown	1 September 1960	Replaced by 2481st Air Force Reserve Sector.	
Air Reserve Training Wing, Provisional, 2482d	Denver, CO	CONAC	14 May 1958	8 Jul 1958	Replaced by 2482d Air Reserve Training Wing.	
2482d Air Reserve Training Wing	Denver, CO	CONAC	c. 8 Jul 1958	1 Sep 1960	Replaced by 2482d Air Force Reserve Sector.	
Air Reserve Training Wing, Provisional, 2483d	Saint Louis, MO	CONAC	c 8 May 1958	8 Jul 1959	Replaced by 2383d Air Reserve Training Wing.	
2483d Air Reserve Training Wing	Saint Louis, MO; Scott AFB, IL	CONAC	8 Jul 1958; Fall 1958	Fall 1958; 1 Sep 1960	Replaced by 2483d Air Force Reserve Sector.	
Air Reserve Training Wing, Provisional, 2484th	Hensley Field, TX	CONAC	c. 8 May 1958	8 Jul 1959	Replaced by 2384th Air Reserve Training Wing.	
2484th Air Reserve Training Wing	Hensley Field, TX	CONAC	8 Jul 1958	1 Sep 1960	Replaced by 2484th Air Force Reserve Sector.	
Air Reserve Training Wing, Provisional, 2485th	Ellington AFB, TX	CONAC	c. 8 May 1958	8 Jul 1959	Replaced by 2385th Air Reserve Training Wing.	
2485th Air Reserve Training Wing	Ellington AFB, TX	CONAC	8 Jul 1958	1 Sep 1960	Replaced by 2485th Air Force Reserve Sector.	
Air Reserve Training Wing, Provisional, 2490th	Mitchel AFB, NY	CONAC	8 May 1958	8 Jul 1959	Replaced by 2390th Air Reserve Training Wing.	
2490th Air Reserve Training Wing	Mitchel AFB, NY	CONAC	8 Jul 1958	1 Sep 1960	Replaced by 2490th Air Force Reserve Sector.	
2491st Air Reserve Training Wing	Grenier Field, NH	CONAC	c. 1 Jul 1958	1 Sep 1960	Replaced by 2491st Air Force Reserve Sector.	
2492d Air Reserve Training Wing	Greater Pittsburgh IAP, PA	CONAC	1 Jul 1958	1 Sep 1960	Replaced by 2492d Air Force Reserve Sector.	
2493d Air Reserve Training Wing	Andrews AFB, MD	CONAC	1 Jul 1958	1 Jul 1960	Replaced by 2493d Air Force Reserve Sector.	
2494th Air Reserve Training Wing	Clinton County AFB, OH	CONAC	1 Jul 1958	1 Sep 1960	Replaced by 2494th Air Force Reserve Sector.	
2495th Air Reserve Training Wing	Atlanta, GA	CONAC	1 Jul 1958	1 Sep 1960	Replaced by 2495th Air Force Reserve Sector.	
2496th Air Reserve Training Wing	Tampa, FL	CONAC	1 Jul 1958	1 Sep 1960	Replaced by 2496th Air Force Reserve Sector.	
2500th Air Base Wing	Mitchel AFB, NY	CONAC	1 Jun 1952	25 Jun 1961	Was 2500 ABG. 2500 ABG Mar 1958-Jul 1959. Base closed.	
2705 Air Munitions Wing	Hill AFB, UT	AFLC	8 Jan 1960	1 Nov 1969	Discontinued.	
2710th Air Base Wing	Tachikawa AB, Japan	AMC	c. 1 Jul 1957	1 Jan 1961	Replaced 375 ABG when base transferred from PACAF. Replaced by 6100 ABW.	
2750th Air Base Wing	Wright-Patterson AFB, OH	AMC/AFLC	28 Aug 1948	1 Oct 1992	Was 4000th AF Base Unit (Air Base). Redesignated 645th Air Base Wing	
2751st Experimental Wing	Griffiss AFB, NY	AMC	c. 20 Sep 1949	12 Jun 1951	Was 2751st Air Force Base.	
2754th Experimental Wing	Holloman AFB, NM	AMC	20 Sep 1949	c. 30 Jun 1951	Was 2754th Air Force Base. Transferred to ARDC as 6540th Missile Test Wing.	
2758th Experimental Wing	Kirtland AFB, NM	AMC	c. 1948	c. 1949	Was 2758th Air Force Base. Transferred to SWC as 4901st Special Weapons Wing.	
2759th Experimental Wing	Edwards AFB, CA	AMC	c. 20 May 1949	25 Jun 1951	Was 2759th Air Force Base. Replaced by AF Test Center	
2842d Transportation Control Wing	McClellan AFB, CA	AMC	26 Feb 1952	1 Jun 1953	Discontinued.	
2845th Air Depot Wing	Griffiss AFB, NY	AMC	28 Jul 1952	3 Jan 1955	Was 2905th Specialized Depot Group. Discontinued along with Rome Air Depot	
2848th Air Base Wing	Norton AFB, CA	AMC, AFLC	1 May 1953	8 Jul 1964	Replaced 2950th ABW. Redesignated 2848th ABG.	
2849th Air Base Wing	Hill AFB, UT	AMC, AFLC	1 May 1953	8 Jul 1964	Replaced 25th ABG. Redesignated 2849th ABG.	
2850th Air Base Wing	Brookley AFB, AL	AMC, AFLC	1 May 1953	c. 8 Jul 1964	Redesignated 2850th ABG.	
2851st Air Base Wing	Kelly AFB, TX	AMC, AFLC	1 Aug 1953	16 Oct 1964	Replaced 3048th ABG. Redesignated 2851st ABG,	
2852d Air Base Wing	McClellan AFB, CA	AMC, AFLC	1 Aug 1953	16 Oct 1964	Replaced 3083d Air Base Gp. Redesignated 2852d Air Base Group	
2853d Air Base Wing	Robins AFB, GA	AMC, AFLC	1 Aug 1953	16 Oct 1964	Redesignated 2853d ABG.	
2854th Air Base Wing	Tinker AFB, OK	AMC, AFLC	1 Aug 1953	16 Oct 1964	Redesignated 2854th ABG.	
2855th Air Base Wing	Olmsted AFB, PA	AMC, AFLC	c. 1 Aug 1953	c. 16 Oct 1964	Redesignated 2855th ABG.	
2856th Air Base Wing	Griffiss AFB, NY	AMC, AFLC	16 Feb 1958	1 Jul 1970	Replaced by 416th CSG when base transferred to SAC.	
2899th Depot Training Wing	Kelly AFB, TX	AMC	11 Feb 1952	4 Apr 55	Replaced 2949th Depot Training Wing.	
2900th Air Depot Wing (Mobile)	Kelly AFB, TX	AMC	16 Aug 1954	1 Mar 1956	Discontinued.	
2940th Depot Training Wing	Kelly AFB, TX	AMC	16 Mar 1951	11 Feb 1952	Replaced by 2899th Depot Training Wing.	
2941st Depot Training Wing	Brookley AFB, AL	AMC	15 Mar 1951	19 Nov 1952	Discontinued.	
2942d Depot Training Wing	McClellan AFB, CA	AMC	16 Mar 1951	3 Jan 1955	Discontinued.	
2943d Depot Training Wing	Robins AFB, GA	AMC	15 Mar 1951	19 Nov 1952	Discontinued.	
2944th Depot Training Wing	Tinker AFB, OK	AMC	15 Mar 1951	19 Nov 1952	Discontinued.	
2949th Depot Training Wing	Hill AFB, UT	AMC	12 Oct 1951	27 Nov 1952	Discontinued.	
2950th Depot Training Wing	Norton AFB, CA	AMC	7 Nov 1951	19 Nov 1952	Discontinued.	
3079th Aviation Depot Wing	Wright-Patterson AFB, OH	AMC	6 Feb 1955	1 Jul 1962	Flying units transferred to 39th Logistics Support Group. Special weapons storage units transferred to SAC or Air Materiel Areas.	
3090th Air Depot Wing	Wright-Patterson AFB, OH	AMC	5 Dec 1953	1 Jun 1954	Unknown.	
3090th Support Wing	Madrid, Spain	AMC	c. 1 Jan 1955	1 Jan 1957	Transferred to USAFE as 7602d Support Wing.	(Note: This source erroneously uses the unit's post-July 1957 number for its pre-January 1957 number.)
3130th Air Base Wing	Chateauroux AS, France	AMC	c. 1 Jan 1956	c. 1958	Replaced 7373d Air Depot Wing when base transferred from USAFE. Redesignated 3130th ABG.	
3153d Air Base Wing	Nouasseur AB, Morocco	AMC	1 Mar 1954	c. 1 Jul 1958	Replaced 7280th Air Depot Wing when base transferred from USAFE. Redesignated 3922d ABG when base transferred to SAC.	
3200th Maintenance Wing; 3200th Test Wing (Maintenance)	Eglin AFB, FL	APGC	1 Jul 1953; 1 Oct 1954	1 Oct 1954; 24 Oct 1955	Replaced by 3241st Test Group.	
3200th Proof Test Wing	Eglin AFB, FL	APGC	1 Apr 1951	1 Jul 1952	Functions split among 3200th Maintenance Wing, 3202d Installations Wing and 3206th Support Wing.	
3200th Support Wing	Eglin AFB, FL	AFSC	10 Jun 88	1 Oct 1992	Replaced 3201st ABG. Redesignated 646th Air Base Wing	
3201st Air Base Wing	Eglin AFB, FL	APGC, AFSC	1 Apr 1951	16 Sep 1964	Replaced by 3201 ABG	
3202d Installations Wing	Eglin AFB, FL	APGC	1 Jul 1953	1 Aug 1955	Redesignated 3201st Installations Group	
3206th Support Wing; 3206th Test Wing	Eglin AFB, FL	APGC	1 Jul 1953 c. 1 Oct 1954	c. 1 Oct 1954; 1 Aug 1957	Redesignated 3206th Test Group	
3245th Air Base Wing	L G Hanscom Field, MA	ARDC, AFSC	1 Apr 1960	1 Jul 1964	Replaced 6520th ABG. Redesignated 3245th ABG.	
3246th Test Wing	Eglin AFB, FL	AFSC	1 Jul 1970	1 Oct 1992	Replaced by 46th Test Wing	
3250th Technical Training Wing	Lackland AFB, TX	ATC	1 Apr 1977	1 Jan 1978	Discontinued.	
3250th Technical Training Wing	Lackland AFB, TX	ATC	1 Nov 1979	1 Feb 1992	Redesignated 3250th TTG.	
3275th AF Indoctrination Wing; 3275th Basic Military Training Wing	Parks AFB, CA	ATC	16 Aug 1951; 6 Jan 1953	6 Jan 1953; 1 Jan 1957	Transferred to CONAC as 2349 ABW.	
3300th Technical Training Wing	Keesler AFB, MS	ATC	1 Apr 1977	1 Jan 1978	Discontinued.	
3300th Technical Training Wing	Keesler AFB, MS	ATC	1 Oct 1979	1 Feb 1992	Redesignated 3300th Technical Training Group.	
3310th Technical Training Wing	Scott AFB, IL	ATC	28 Aug 1948	1 Oct 1957	Replaced 3505th AF Base Unit. Redesignated 1405th ABW when base transferred to MATS.	
3320th Technical Training Wing	Amarillo AFB, TX	ATC	12 Mar 1951	1 Jan 1959	Redesignated Amarillo Technical Training Center.	
3330th Technical Training Wing	Chanute AFB, IL	ATC	1 Apr 1977	1 Jan 1978	Discontinued.	
3330th Technical Training Wing	Chanute AFB, IL	ATC	1 Nov 1979	c. 30 Sep 1993	Base closed.	
3345th Technical Training Wing	Chanute AFB, IL	ATC	26 Aug 1948	1 Jan 1959	Replaced 3502d AF Base Unit. Redesignated Chanute Technical Training Center,	(Note: Mueller usually gives 26 August 1948 as the organization dater for Air Training Command wings that replaced base units. Manning gives 28 August, which is consistent with the date other support commands implemented the wing/base plan.)
3380th Technical Training Wing	Keesler AFB, MS	ATC	26 Aug 1948	1 Jan 1959	Replaced 3704th AF Base Unit. Redesignated Keesler Technical Training Center.	
3400th Technical Training Wing	Lowry AFB, CO	ATC	1 Apr 1977	1 Jan 1978	Discontinued.	
3400th Technical Training Wing	Lowry AFB, CO	ATC	1 Nov 1979	c. 1 Feb 1992	Discontinued.	
3415th Technical Training Wing	Lowry AFB, CO	ATC	26 Aug 1948	1 Jan 1959	Replaced 3705th AF Base Unit. Redesignated Lowry Technical Training Center	
3450th Technical Training Wing	Francis E. Warren AFB, WY	ATC	26 Aug 1948	1 Feb 1958	Replaced 463d AF Base Unit. Support units replaced by SAC 389th ABG.	
3480th Technical Training Wing	Goodfellow AFB, TX	ATC	1 Jul 1978	1 Feb 1992	Redesignated 3480th TTG, now 17th Training Group	
3499th Training Aids Wing	Chanute AFB, IL	ATC	1 Oct 1949	14 Jul 1951	Discontinued.	
3499th Mobile Training Wing	Chanute AFB, IL	ATC	4 Nov 1952	30 Jun 1957	Was 3499th Mobile Training Group. Discontinued.	
3499th Field Training Wing	Chanute AFB, IL	ATC	30 Jun 1957	1 Sep 1959	Replaced 3499th Mobile Training Wing. Discontinued.	
3500th Pilot Training Wing	Barksdale AFB, LA; Reese AFB, TX	ATC	26 Aug 1948; 14 Oct 1949	14 Oct 1949; 1 Oct 1972	Replaced 2621 AF Base Unit. Replaced by 64th Flying Training Wing.	
3500th Recruiting Wing	Wright-Patterson AFB, OH	ATC	10 Apr 1954	8 Jul 1959	Was 3500th Personnel Processing Group at Waco AFB, TX. Replaced by USAF Recruiting Service.	
3505th Pilot Training Wing	Greenville AFB, MS	ATC	1 Feb 1953	1 Dec 1960	Replaced by 3505th Technical Training Group	
3510th Flying Training Wing	Randolph AFB, TX	ATC	26 Aug 1948	1 May 1972	Replaced 2532 AF Base Unit. Also 3510th Basic Flying Training Wg, Pilot Training Wg, CCTW. Replaced by 12th Flying Training Wing	
3520th Combat Crew Training Wing; 3520th Flying Training Wing; 3520th Combat Crew Training Wing	McConnell AFB, KS	ATC	1 Jun 1951; 11 Jun 1952; 25 Sep 1954	11 Jun 1952; 25 Sep 1954; 1 Jul 1958	Transferred to SAC as 4347th CCTW.	
3525th Pilot Training Wing; 3525th Combat Crew Training Wing	Williams AFB, AZ	ATC	28 Aug 1948; 1 Jan 1956	1 Jan 1956; 1 Jul 1958	Replaced 3010 AF Base Unit. Transferred to TAC as 4530 CCTW.	
3525th Pilot Training Wing	Williams AFB, AZ	ATC	1 Oct 1960	1 Feb 1973	Was 4530th CCTW Replaced by 82d Flying Training Wing	
3530th Pilot Training Wing	Bryan AFB, TX	ATC	1 Jul 1951	25 Oct 1958	Base closed	
3535th Bombardment Training Wing; 3535th Observer Training Wing; 3535th Aircraft Observer Training Wing; 3535th Navigator Training Wing	Mather AFB, CA	ATC	28 Aug 1948; 27 Jun 1952; 10 Sep 1954; 15 Sep 1956	27 Jun 1952; 10 Sep 1954; 15 Sep 1956; 1 Apr 1973	Replaced 2622d AF Base Unit. Replaced by 323d Flying Training Wing.	
3540th Combat Crew Training Wing; 3540th Flying Training Wing	Pinecastle AFB, FL	ATC	10 Jan 1951; 27 Jun 1952	27 Jun 1952; 1 Jan 1954	Transferred to SAC as 4042d Flying Training Wing.	
3545th Pilot Training Wing	Goodfellow AFB, TX	ATC	28 Aug 1948	1 Oct 1958	Replaced 2533d AF Base Unit. Replaced by 6940th ABW when base transferred to USAFSS	
3550th Training Wg; 3550th Flying Training Wg; 3350th Combat Crew Training Wg; 3550th Flying Training Wg; 3550th Pilot Training Wing	Moody AFB, GA	ATC	1 Sep 1951; 11 Jun 1952; Sep 1954; 15 Aug 1958; 5 Jan 1961	11 Jun 1952; Sep 1954; 15 Aug 1958; 5 Jan 1961; 1 Dec 1973	Replaced by 38th Flying Training Wing.	
3555th Pilot Training Wing; 3555th Flying Training Wg; 3555th Combat Crew Training Wg; 3555th Flying Training Wg	Perrin AFB, TX	ATC	28 Aug 1948; 15 Jun 1952; Sep 1954; 15 Aug 1958	15 Jun 1952; Sep 1954; 15 Aug 1958; 1 Jul 1962	Replaced by 4780th Air Defense Wing.	
3560th Pilot Training Wing	Webb AFB, TX	ATC	1 Oct 1951	1 Dec 1972	Replaced by 78th Flying Training Wing.	
3565th Pilot Training Wg; 3565th Observer Training Wg; 3565 Aircraft Observer Training Wg; 3565th Navigator Training Wing	James Connally AFB, TX	ATC	28 Aug 1948; 27 Jun 1952; Sep 1954; 15 Sep 1956	2 Jun 1952; Sep 1954; 15 Sep 1956; 1 Jan 1966	Base transferred to TAC.	
3575th Pilot Training Wing	Vance AFB, OK	ATC	28 Aug 1948	1 Nov 1972	Replaced 2518 AF Base Unit. Replaced by 71st Flying Training Wing.	
3580th Pilot Training Wing	Foster AFB, TX	ATC	1 May 1952	1 Jul 1954	Support units to 450th Fighter-Bomber Wing.	
3585th Pilot Training Wing	San Marcos AFB, TX	ATC	25 Aug 1948	Mar 1949	Base closed	
3585th Flying Training Wing	Edward Gary AFB, TX	ATC	1 Feb 1951	14 Feb 56	Base reopened, closed	
3595th Pilot Training Wing; 3595th Training Wing (Combat Crew); 3595th Flying Training Wing; 3595th Combat Crew Training Wing	Nellis AFB, NV	ATC	22 Dec 1948; Jul 1950; 11 Jun 1952; Sep 1954	Jul 1950; 11 Jun 1952; Sep 1954; 1 Jul 1958	Transferred to TAC as 4520th CCTW.	
3600th Flying Training Wing; 3600th Combat Crew Training Wing	Luke AFB, AZ	ATC	1 Nov 1952; Sep 1954	Sep 1954; 1 Jul 1958	Replaced 127th Pilot Training Wing. (Note: The 127th Wing was a Michigan Air National Guard unit that had been mobilized for the Korean War.) Transferred to TAC as 4510th CCTW.	
3605th Navigator Training Wing; 3605th Observer Training Wing; 3605th Aircraft Observer Training Wing; 3605th Navigator Training Wing	Ellington AFB, TX	ATC	c. 15 Apr 1949; 27 Jun 1952; Sep 1954; 15 Nov 1956	27 Jun 1952; Sep 1954; 15 Nov 1956; Apr 1958	Base transferred to Continental Air Command, support units to 2578 ABG	
3610th Observer Training Wing; 3610th Aircraft Observer Training Wing; 3610th Navigator Training Wing	Harlingen AFB, TX	ATC	1 Apr 1952; Sep 1954; 15 Nov 1956	Sep 1954; 15 Nov 1956; 1 Jul 1962	Base reopened to base closed	
3615th Pilot Training Wing; 3615th Flying Training Wing; 3615th Pilot Training Wing	Craig AFB, AL	ATC	1 Sep 1950; Sep 1954; 1960	Sep 1954; 19600; 1 Jul 1972	Was 3840th Air University Wing. Replaced by 29th Flying Training Wing.	
3625th Training Wing; 3625th Flying Training Wing; 3625th Combat Crew Training Wing	Tyndall AFB, FL	ATC	1 Sep 1950; 11 Jun 1952; Sep 1954	11 Jun 1952; Sep 1954; 1 Jul 1957	Was 3820th Air University Wing. Replaced by 4756th Air Defense Wing.	
3630th Flying Training Wing	Sheppard AFB, TX	ATC	10 Dec 1965	1 Jan 1973	Replaced by 80th Flying Training Wing.	
3635th Combat Crew Training Wing; 3635th Flying Training Wing	Stead AFB, NV	ATC	1 Sep 1954; 15 Jul 1958	15 Jul 1958; 15 Jun 1966	Transferred from SAC, was 3904th Composite Wing. Base closed.	
3636th Combat Crew Training Wing	Fairchild AFB, WA	ATC	1 Apr 1971	28 Jan 1992	Was 3636th CCTG. Consolidated with 336th Bombardment Group as 336th Crew Training Group.	
3640th Pilot Training Wing	Laredo AFB, TX	ATC	1 Apr 1952	1 Aug 1972	Replaced by 38th Flying Training Wing.	
3645th Pilot Training Wing; 3645th Flying Training Wing; 3645th Combat Crew Training Wing; 3645th Pilot Training Wing	Laughlin AFB, TX	ATC	1 May 1952; 1 Oct 1952; Sep 1954; 1 Jan 1956	1 Oct 1952; Sep 1954; 1 Jan 1956; 1 Apr 1957	Base reopened. Replaced by 4080th Strategic Reconnaissance Wing.	
3645th Pilot Training Wing	Laughlin AFB, TX	ATC	16 Oct 1961	15 Feb 1962	Replaced 4080th Strategic Reconnaissance Wing. Redesignated 3636th Pilot Training Wing.	
3646th Pilot Training Wing	Laughlin AFB, TX	ATC	15 Feb 1962	1 Aug 1972	Was 3645th Pilot Training Wing. Replaced by 47th Flying Training Wing.	
3650th AF Indoctrination Wing; 3650th Military Training Wing	Sampson AFB, NY	ATC	1 Dec 1950; 6 Jan 1953	6 Jan 1953 c. 30 Jun 1956	Former Navy training base reopened. Base transferred to Air Materiel Command for closing.	
3650th Pilot Training Wing	Columbus AFB, MS	ATC	1 Jul 1969	1 Aug 1972	Replaced 454th Bombardment Wing. Replaced by 14th Flying Training Wing.	
3700th AF Indoctrination Wing; 3700th Military Training Wing	Lackland AFB, TX	ATC	28 Oct 1949; 6 Jan 1953	6 Jan 1953; 1 Jan 1959	Was Indoctrination Division, ATC. Redesignated Lackland Military Training Center.	
3700th Basic Training Wing	Lackland AFB, TX	ATC	26 Aug 1948	22 Apr 1949	Discontinued.	
3700th Technical Training Wing	Sheppard AFB, TX	ATC	1 Apr 1977	1 Jan 1978	Discontinued.	
3700th Technical Training Wing	Sheppard AFB, TX	ATC	1 Nov 1979	1 Feb 1992	Redesignated 3700th Technical Training Group	
3750th Basic Training Wing; 3750th Technical Training Wing	Sheppard AFB, TX	ATC	28 Aug 1948; 1 Apr 1949	1 Apr 1949; 1 Jan 1959	Replace 370 AF Base Unit. Redesignated Sheppard Technical Training Center.	(Note: Mueller indicates the April 1949 action was a redesignation. Manning says the basic training wing was discontinued and the technical training wing was newly organized.)
3785th Field Training Wing	Sheppard AFB, TX	ATC	1 Jul 1984	1 Feb 1992	Was 3785th Field Training Group. Redesignated 396th Field Training Group	
3790th Medical Service Training Wing	Sheppard AFB, TX	ATC	1 Apr 1988	1 Feb 1992	Replaced School of Health Care Sciences. Redesignated 3790th Medical Service Training Group	
3800th Air University Wing; 3800th Air Base Wing	Maxwell AFB, AL	AU, ATC	28 Jul 1948; 1 Sep 1954; 21 Jul 1983	1 Sep 1954; 2 Jan 1979; 1 Oct 1992	Replaced 502d Air University Wing; 3800 ABG, Jan 1979-Jul 1983. Consolidated with 502d Air University Wing as 502d Air Base Wing.	
3820th Air University Wing	Tyndall AFB, FL	AU	28 Jul 1948	1 Sep 1950	Replaced 500th AU Wing. Transferred to ATC as 3625th Training Wing.	
3840th Air University Wing	Craig AFB, FL	AU	28 Jul 198	1 Sep 1950	Replaced 501st AU Wing. Transferred to ATC as 3615th Pilot Training Wing.	
3902d Air Base Wing	Offutt AFB, NE	SAC	16 Aug 1949	1 Mar 1986	Replaced 3902 ABG. Replaced by 55th CSG	
3904th Composite Wing	Camp Carson, CO; Stead AFB, NV	SAC	21 Oct 1950; 1 Sep 1951	1 Sep 1951; 1 Sep 1954	Replaced 3904 Training Squadron, Transferred to ATC as 3635th Combat Crew Training Wing.	
3918th Strategic Wing	RAF Upper Heyford, UK	SAC	1 May 1964	31 Mar 1965	Was 3918 CSG. Support units transferred to 7514 CSG.	
3920th Strategic Wing	RAF Brize Norton, UK	SAC	1 Jul 1957	31 Mar 1965	Discontinued.	
3960th Air Base Wing; 3960th Strategic Wing	Andersen AFB, Guam	SAC	1 Apr 1955; 1 Nov 1963; 1 Apr 1965	1 Jul 1956; 1 Aug 1964; 1 Apr 1970	3960th ABG Jul 1956-Jul 1959. 3960th CSG, Jul 1959-Nov 1963, Aug 64-Apr 1965. Replaced by 43d Strategic Wing.	
3970th Strategic Wing	Torrejon AB, Spain	SAC	1 Feb 1964	25 Jun 1966	98th Strategic Wing	
3973d Strategic Wing	Moron AB, Spain	SAC	1 Feb 1964	l Apr 1966	Was 3973d CSG. Replaced by 7473d CSG when base transferred to USAFE.	
3977th Support Wing	Madrid, Spain	SAC	1957	1 Apr 1958	Was 7602d Support Wing. Redesignated 3977th Support Group.	
4008th Consolidated Aircraft Maintenance Wing	Barksdale AFB, LA	SAC	1 Jul 1975	30 Jun 1977	Discontinued.	
4026th Strategic Wing	Wurtsmith AFB, MI	SAC	1 Aug 1958	9 Jan 1961	Replaced by 379th Bombardment Wing.	
4038th Strategic Wing	Dow AFB, ME	SAC	1 Aug 1958	1 Feb 1963	Nonoperational until Feb 61. Replaced by 397th Bombardment Wing.	
4039th Strategic Wing	Griffiss AFB, NY	SAC	1 Aug 1958	1 Feb 1963	Replaced by 416th Bombardment Wing.	
4042d Strategic Wing	K.I. Sawyer AFB, MI	SAC	1 Aug 1958	1 Feb 1963	Replaced by 410th Bombardment Wing	
4043d Strategic Wing	Wright-Patterson AFB, OH	SAC	1 Aug 1958	1 Feb 1963	Replaced by 17th Bombardment Wing.	
4045th Air Refueling Wing	Selfridge AFB, MI	SAC	1 Jul 1959	1 Jan 1963	Replaced by 500th Air Refueling Wing.	
4047th Strategic Wing	McCoy AFB, FL	SAC	1 Jul 1961	1 Apr 1963	Replaced by 306th Bombardment Wing.	
4050th Air Refueling Wing	Westover AFB, MA	SAC	1 Apr 1955	1 Jan 1963	Replaced by 499th Air Refueling Wing.	
4060th Air Refueling Wing	Dow AFB, ME	SAC	8 Mar 1955	1 Feb 1960	Discontinued. Support units transferred to 4038th Strategic Wing.	
4061st Air Refueling Wing	Malmstrom AFB, MT	SAC	1 Jul 1957	15 Jul 1961	Discontinued. Support units transferred to 341st Strategic Missile Wing.	
4062d Strategic Missile Wing (Minuteman)	Hill AFB, UT	SAC	1 Dec 1960	20 Feb 1962	Discontinued.	
4070th Support Wing	March AFB, CA	SAC	20 Dec 1955	15 Jun 1957	Discontinued.	
4080th Strategic Reconnaissance Wing, Light; 4080th Strategic Wing	Turner AFB, GA; Laughlin AFB, TX; Davis–Monthan AFB, AZ	SAC	1 May 1956; 1 Apr 1957; 1 Jul 1963	1 Apr 1957; 1 Jul 1963; 25 Jun 1966	Redesignated 15 Jun 1960. Replaced by 100th Strategic Reconnaissance Wing.	
4081st Strategic Wing	Ernest Harmon AFB, Canada	SAC	1 Apr 1957	25 Jun 1966	Replaced 6605th ABW when base transferred from NEAC. Replaced by 4081st Air Base Squadron.	
4082d Strategic Wing	RCAF Goose Bay, Canada	SAC	1 Jun 1963	2 Oct 1966	Replaced 6606 ABW. Replaced by 95th Strategic Wing.	
4083d Air Base Wing	Thule AB, Greenland	SAC	1 Jul 1949	1 Jul 1960	Was 4083d ABG. Replaced by 4683d ABG when base transferred to ADC.	
4083d Strategic Wing	Thule AB, Greenland	SAC	1 Apr 1957	1 Jul 1959	Discontinued. Replaced by 4683d Air Defense Wing.	
4090th Air Refueling Wing	Clinton County AFB, OH	SAC	1 Aug 1958	1 Jul 1960	Discontinued. Base transferred to AF Reserve before wing received aircraft.	
4108th Air Refueling Wing	Plattsburgh AFB, NY	SAC	1 Jan 1961	1 Jan 1963	Replaced by 497th Air Refueling Wing.	
4123d Strategic Wing	Carswell AFB, TX; Clinton-Sherman AFB, OK	SAC	10 Dec 1957; 25 Feb 1959	25 Feb 1959; 1 Feb 1963	Relocated after completion of construction. Replaced by 70th Bombardment Wing.	
4126th Strategic Wing	Beale AFB, CA	SAC	8 Feb 1959	1 Feb 1963	Replaced by 456th Strategic Aerospace Wing.	
4128th Strategic Wing	Amarillo AFB, TX	SAC	5 Jan 1959	1 Feb 1963	Replaced by 461st Bombardment Wing.	
4130th Strategic Wing	Bergstrom AFB, TX	SAC	1 Oct 1958	1 Sep 1963	Replaced by 340th Bombardment Wing.	
4133d Strategic Wing	Grand Forks AFB, ND	SAC	1 Sep 1958	1 Feb 1963	Replaced by 319th Bombardment Wing.	
Bombardment Wing, Provisional, 4133d	Andersen AFB, Guam	SAC	1 Feb 1966	1 Jul 1970	Operational headquarters for B-52 units deployed for Operation Arc Light	
4134th Strategic Wing	Mather AFB, CA	SAC	1 May 1958	1 Feb 1963	Replaced by 320th Bombardment Wing.	
4135th Strategic Wing	Eglin AFB, FL	SAC	1 Dec 1958	1 Feb 1963	Replaced by 39th Bombardment Wing.	
4136th Strategic Wing	Minot AFB, ND	SAC	1 Sep 1958	1 Feb 1963	Replaced by 450th Bombardment Wing.	
4137th Strategic Wing	Robins AFB, GA	SAC	1 Jul 1959	1 Feb 1963	Replaced by 465th Bombardment Wing.	
4138th Strategic Wing	Turner AFB. GA	SAC	1 Jan 1959	1 Feb 1963	Replaced by 484th Bombardment Wing.	
4141st Strategic Wing	Glasgow AFB, MT	SAC	1 Sep 1958	1 Feb 1963	Replaced by 91st Bombardment Wing.	
4157th Strategic Wing	Eielson AFB, AK	SAC	c. 1 Nov 1963	25 Mar 1967	Was 4157th CSG. Replaced by 6th Strategic Aerospace Wing.	
4158th Strategic Wing	Elmendorf AFB, AK	SAC	1 Nov 1963	25 Jun 1966	Was 4158th CSG. Discontinued.	
4170th Strategic Wing	Larson AFB, WA	SAC	1 Jul 1959	1 Feb 1963	Replaced by 462d Strategic Aerospace Wing.	
4190th Wing (Provisional)	Aviano AB, Italy	USAFE	11 Mar 1996	1 Jul 1997	Replaced 7490th Wing (P). Replaced by 16th Air Expeditionary Wing.	
4200th Strategic Reconnaissance Wing	Beale AFB, CA	SAC	1 Apr 1965	25 Jun 1966	Replaced by 9th Strategic Reconnaissance Wing.	
4228th Strategic Wing	Columbus AFB, MS	SAC	1 Jul 1958	1 Feb 1963	Replaced by 454th Bombardment Wing.	
4238th Strategic Wing	Barksdale AFB, LA	SAC	15 Mar 1958	1 Apr 1963	Replaced by 2d Bombardment Wing.	
4239th Strategic Wing	Kincheloe AFB, MI	SAC	1 Jul 1959	1 Feb 1963	Replaced by 449th Bombardment Wing.	
4240d Flying Training Wing	Pinecastle AFB, FL	SAC	1 Jan 1954	25 May 1954	Was 3540 Flying Training Wing. Replaced by 321st Bombardment Wing.	
4241st Strategic Wing	Seymour Johnson AFB, NC	SAC	1 Oct 58	15 Apr 1963	Replaced by 68th Bombardment Wing.	
4245th Strategic Wing	Sheppard AFB, TX	SAC	5 Jan 1959	1 Feb 1963	Replaced by 494th Bombardment Wing.	
4252d Strategic Wing	Kadena AB, Okinawa	SAC	8 Jan 1965	1 Apr 1970	Replaced by 376th Strategic Wing	
4258th Strategic Wing	U-Tapao AB, Thailand	SAC	2 Jun 1966	31 Mar 1970	Replaced by 307th Strategic Wing.	
Bombardment Wing, Provisional, 4300th	Diego Garcia, BIOT	SAC	17 Jan 1991	c. 28 Feb 1991	Operational headquarters for B-52s deployed for Operation Desert Storm.	
4320th Strategic Wing (Missile)	F. E. Warren AFB, WY	SAC	1 Feb 1958	12 Feb 1958	Replaced Strategic Missile Wing, Provisional. Replaced by 706th Strategic Missile Wing, Atlas	
4321st Strategic Wing	Offutt AFB, NE	SAC	1 Oct 1959	1 Jan 1963	Replaced by 385th Strategic Missile Wing.	
4347th Combat Crew Training Wing	McConnell AFB, KS	SAC	1 Jul 1958	15 Jun 1963	Was 3520th CCTW. Discontinued	
4392d Aerospace Support Wing	Vandenberg AFB, CA	SAC	21 Jul 1961	c. 19 Nov 1991	4392 Aerospace Support Group Dec 61-Jul 87. Consolidated with 30th ABG as 30th Support Group	
4397th Air Refueling Wing (Training)	Randolph AFB, TX	SAC	1 Jul 1958	15 Jun 1963	Discontinued. Support units transferred to 388th CSG.	
4403rd Tactical Fighter Wing	England AFB	TAC	15 Sep 1970	1 Jul 1972	Replaced by 23rd TFW.	
4404th Tactical Fighter Wing, Provisional; 4404th Composite Wing, Provisional	Al Kharj, Saudi Arabia; King Abdul Azziz AB, Saudi Arabia	AFCENT	13 Mar 1991; 17 Jun 1991	17 Jun 1991; 1 Jun 1992	Operation Southern Watch Replaced by 4404th Wing, P.	
4404th Wing, Provisional	King Abdul Azziz AB, Saudi Arabia; Prince Sultan AB, Saudi Arabia	AFCENT	1 Jun 1993 c. 26 Jun 1996	c. 26 Jun 1996; 1 Oct 1998	Operation Southern Watch Replaced by 363d Air Expeditionary Wing.	
Operations Support Wing, Provisional 4409th	King Khalid IAP, Saudi Arabia	AFCENT	c. Oct 1990	c. Mar 1991	Operation Desert Storm.	
4410th Combat Crew Training Wing	Hurlburt Field, FL; England AFB, LA	TAC	1 Dec 1965; 15 Jul 1969	15 Jul 1969; 15 September 1970	Redesignated 4410th Special Operations Training Group.	(Note: In 1969, the 4410th moved to England AFB and replaced the 1st Special Operations Wing, while the 1st moved to Hurlburt and replaced the 4410th.)
Operations Support Wing, Provisional, 4410th	King Khalid Mil City, Saudi Arabia	AFCENT	10 Jan 1991	c. 20 Apr 1991	Operation Desert Storm.	
Troop Carrier Wing, Provisional 4413th	Sewart AFB, TN	TAC	1 Dec 1965	1 Jul 1966	Replaced by 64th Tactical Airlift Wing.	
4430th Air Base Wing	Langley AFB, VA	TAC	12 Feb 1952	20 Apr 53	Replaced 47th ABG, Replaced by 405 ABG	
4453rd Combat Crew Training Wing	MacDill AFB, FL; Davis–Monthan AFB	TAC	1 Apr 1964; 1 Jul 1964	1 Jul 1964; 30 Sep 1971	Was 4453d CCTG. Replaced by 355th TFW	
Tactical Fighter Wing, Provisional, 4474th	Nellis AFB, NV	TAC	1 Mar 1977	6 Aug 1977	Discontinued.	
Tactical Training Wing, Provisional, 4479th	Holloman AFB, NM	TAC	28 Oct 1976	1 Jan 1977	Replaced by 479th Tactical Training Wing	
4480th Tactical Fighter Wing	Nellis AFB, NV	TAC	15 Jul 1967	20 Jan 1967	Replaced by 474th TFW	
Composite Test Wing, Provisional, 4485th	Eglin AFB, FL	TAC	1 Feb 1964	16 Mar 1964	Replaced by 4485th Test Wing.	
4485th Test Wing	Eglin AFB, FL	TAC	16 Mar 1964	30 Jun 1965	Replaced Composite Test Wing, P, 4485th.	
4500th Air Base Wing	Langley AFB, VA	TAC	22 Mar 1960	15 Apr 1977	Replaced 836th ABG. Replaced by 1st CSG	
4504th Missile Training Wing (Tactical); 4504th Tactical Missile Wing (Training)	Orlando AFB, FL	TAC	c. 1 Sep 1954; 18 Oct 1956	18 Oct 1956 c. 25 Mar 1967	Discontinued when base closed.	
4505th Air Refueling Wing	Langley AFB, VA	TAC	1 Jul 1958	8 Oct 1963	Discontinued. Squadrons assigned to host base wings.	
4510th Combat Crew Training Wing	Luke AFB, AZ	TAC	1 Jul 1958	16 Oct 1969	Was 3600th CCTW. Replaced by 58th Tactical Fighter Training Wing.	
4520th Combat Crew Training Wing	Nellis AFB, NV	TAC	1 Jul 1958	20 Jan 1968	Was 3595th CCTW. Replaced by 474th TFW.	
4525th Fighter Weapons Wing	Nellis AFB, NV	TAC	1 Sep 1966	15 Oct 1969	Replaced USAF Fighter Weapons School. Replaced by 57th Fighter Weapons Wing.	
4530th Combat Crew Training Wing	Williams AFB, AZ	TAC	1 Sep 1966	15 Oct 1969	Was 3535th CCTW. Transferred to ATC as 3535th Pilot Training Wing	
4531st Tactical Fighter Wing	Homestead AFB, FL	TAC	1 Nov 1966	15 Oct 1970	Replaced by 31st TFW	
4554th Combat Crew Training Wing; 4454th Tactical Fighter Wing	Myrtle Beach AFB, SC	TAC	27 May 1969; 1 Apr 1970	1 Apr 1970; 15 Jun 1970	Replaced 113th TFW. Replaced by 354th TFW.	
4600th Air Base Wing	Peterson AFB, CO	ADC	8 Apr 1958	15 Mar 1975	Was 4600th ABG. Replaced by 46th Aerospace Defense Wing	
4601st Support Wing	Paramus, NJ; Stewart AFB, NY	ADC	1 Oct 1959	1 Oct 1963	Discontinued.	
4602d Support Wing	Ottawa, Canada	ADC	1 Jul 1959	1 Jul 1963	4602d Support Group redesignated. Discontinued.	
4620th Air Defense Wing, SAGE Experimental	Lexington MA; Santa Monica CA	ADC	1 Jun 1955	1 Feb 1961	Discontinued.	
4621st Air Defense Wing, SAGE	McGuire AFB, NJ	ADC	1 Apr 1956	1 Oct 1956	Redesignated New York Air Defense Sector.	
4622d Air Defense Wing, SAGE	Otis AFB, MA	ADC	1 Apr 1956	1 Oct 1956	Redesignated Boston Air Defense Sector.	
4624th Air Defense Wing, SAGE	Syracuse AFS, NY	ADC	1 Oct 1956	15 Aug 1958	Redesignated Syracuse Air Defense Sector.	
4625th Air Defense Wing, SAGE	Fort Lee AFS, VA	ADC	1 Dec 1956	1 Sep 1958	Redesignated Washington Air Defense Sector.	
4627th Air Defense Wing, SAGE	Custer AFS, MI	ADC	Not active		Redesignated Detroit Air Defense Sector before activation.	
4628th Air Defense Wing, SAGE	Truax Field, WI	ADC	Not active		Redesignated Chicago Air Defense Sector before activation.	
4683d Air Defense Wing	Thule AB, Greenland	ADC	1 Jul 1960	1 Jul 1965	Replaced 4083d Air Base Wing. Discontinued.	
4700th Air Defense Wing	Geiger Field, WA	ADC	1 Sep 1958	30 Jun 1960	Inactivated and mission merged into Spokane Air Defense Sector	
4702d Defense Wing	Hamilton AFB, CA; Geiger Field, WA	ADC	1 Feb 1952	8 Oct 1954	Moved on 7 Nov 1952. Discontinued.	
4703d Defense Wing	Larson AFB, WA	ADC	1 Feb 1952	7 Apr 1952	Support elements replaced by 62d ABG when base transferred to TAC.	
4704th Air Defense Wing	McChord AFB, WA	ADC	1 Feb 1952	8 Oct 1954	Discontinued.	
4705th Defense Wing	Norton AFB, CA	ADC	1 Feb 1952	1 Mar 1952	Replaced elements of 1st Fighter-Interceptor Wing in California. Operational components reassigned to 94th FIS at George AFB.	
4706th Defense Wing; 4706th Air Defense Wing	O'Hare IAP, IL	ADC	1 Feb 1952; 1 Sep 1954	1 Sep 1954; 8 Jul 1956	Discontinued.	
4707th Defense Wing; 4707th Air Defense Wing	Otis AFB, MA	ADC	1 Feb 1952; 1 Sep 1954	1 Sep 1954; 18 Oct 1956	Replaced by 33d Fighter Wing (Air Defense).	
4708th Defense Wing; 4708th Air Defense Wing	Selfridge AFB, MI	ADC	1 Feb 1952; 1 Sep 1954	1 Sep 1954; 8 Jul 1956	Discontinued.	
4709th Defense Wing; 4709th Air Defense Wing	McGuire AFB, NJ	ADC	1 Feb 1952; 1 Sep 1954	1 Sep 1954; 18 Oct 1956	Operational elements transferred to 4621st Air Defense Wing in July 1956.	
4710th Defense Wing; 4710th Air Defense Wing	New Castle Airport, DE; O'Hare International Airport	ADC	1 Feb 1952; 1 Mar 1956	1 Mar 1956; 8 Jul 1956	Redesignated 1 September 1954. Discontinued.	
4711th Defense Wing; 4711th Air Defense Wing	Presque Isle AFB, ME; Selfridge AFB	ADC	1 Feb 1952; 1 Mar 1956	1 Mar 1956; 8 Jul 1956	Redesignated 1 September 1954. Discontinued.	
4737th Air Base Wing	Pepperell AFB, Canada	ADC	1 Apr 1957	1 May 1958	Was 6604th ABW. Subordinate units transferred to 64th Air Division.	
4750th Training Wing (Air Defense); 4750th Air Defense Wing	Vincent AFB, AZ	ADC	1 Sep 1953; 1 Sep 1954	1 Sep 1954; 25 Jun 1950	Discontinued when Vincent AFB closed.	
4751st Air Defense Missile Wing; 4751st Air Defense Wing (Missile)	Hurlburt Field, FL	ADC	1 Oct 1957; 15 Jan 1958	15 Jan 1958; 1 Jul 1962	Support units transferred to 4420th CSG when base transferred to TAC	
4752d Air Defense Wing	Oklahoma City AFS, OK	ADC	1 Sep 1961	25 Jun 1963	Replaced and replaced by Oklahoma City Air Defense Sector	
4756th Air Defense Wing (Weapons)	Tyndall AFB, FL	ADC	1 Jul 1957	1 Jul 1960	Operational units transferred to 73d Air Division	
4756th Air Defense Wing (Training)	Tyndall AFB, FL	ADC	1 Jul 1957	30 Sep 1967	Replaced 3625th CCTW. Operational units transferred to Air Defense Weapons Center.	
4780th Air Defense Wing (Training)	Perrin AFB, TX	ADC	1 Jul 1962	30 Jun 1971	Replaced 3555th Pilot Training Wg. Base closed.	
4800th Guided Missiles Wing	Patrick AFB, FL	LRPG	29 Decr 1950	14 May 1951	Redesignated 6555th Guided Missiles Wing and transferred to ARDC	
4900th Air Base Wing	Kirtland AFB, NM	SWC, ARDC, AFSC	1 Apr 1976	1 Jul 1977	Was 4900th ABG. Redesignated 1606th ABW and transferred to MAC.	
4901st Special Weapons Wing	Kirtland AFB, NM	SWC	c. 1949	1 Dec 1949	Was 2758th Experimental Wing. Merged with Special Weapons Command	
4901st Support Wing (Atomic); Air Base Wing	Kirtland AFB, NM	SWC, ARDC	1 Feb 1951	1 Sep 1954	Redesignated 4900 Support Group.	
4950th Test Wing	Wright-Patterson AFB, OH	AFSC	1 Mar 1971	c. 1 Oct 1992	Mission moved to Edwards AFB	
5001st Air Base Wing	Ladd AFB, AK	AAC	8 Apr 1953	20 Sep 1954	Replaced 5001st ABG. Replaced by 5001st ABG.	
5001st Composite Wing	Ladd AFB, AK	AAC	20 Sep 1948	8 Apr 1953	Replaced Yukon Composite Wing. 5001 Composite Group c. May-Jul 1949 Replaced by 5001st ABW.	
5010th Wing; 5010th Composite Wing; 5010th Air Base Wing	Eielson AFB, AK	AAC	1948; 4 Jun 1949; 8 Oct 1954	4 Jun 1949; 8 Oct 1954; 1 Jan 1965	Was Eielson AFB Bombardment Wing. Redesignated 5010th CSG.	
5020th Wing	Davis AFB, AK	AAC	20 Sep 1948	c. 27 May 1949	Replaced Aleutian Composite Wing. Redesignated 5020th ABG	
5039th Air Depot Wing	Elmendorf AFB, AK	AAC	1 Dec 1949	1 Jan 1951	Replaced Alaska Air Depot. Replaced by 39th Air Depot Wing.	
5039th Air Base Wing	Elmendorf AFB, AK	AAC	13 Apr 1953	1 Jun 1957	Replaced 39th ABG. Replaced by 5039 ABG.	
5040th Air Base Wing	Elmendorf AFB, AK	AAC	1 Oct 1957	8 Jul 1966	Replaced 5039 ABG. Replaced by 21st Composite Wing	
5060th Air Base Wing	Ladd AFB, AK	AAC	1 Nov 1957	10 Jul 1958	Replaced 5001st ABG. Replaced by 5060th Support Group.	
5070th Air Defense Wing	Elmendorf AFB, AK	AAC	1 Aug 1960	1 Oct 1961	Replaced 11th Air Division. Provided air defense of South Alaska	
5600th Wing; 5600th Composite Wing	Howard AFB, Panama Canal Zone	CAirC	26 Jul 1948; 30 Sep 1948	30 Sep 1948; 25 Apr 1949	Replaced 582d Air Service Group. Base closed as primary installation	
5620th Composite Wing	France AFB, Panama Canal Zone	CAirC	c. 26 Jul 1948	c. 13 Jun 1949	Was 5620th Group. Base closed.	
5700th Composite Wing; 5700th Air Base Wing	Albrook AFB, Panama Canal Zone	CAirC	28 Jul 1948 c. 1 May 1949	c. 1 May 1949; 8 Nov 1967	Replaced elements of 6th Fighter Wing and 3d Base Complement Squadron; Replaced by 24th Composite Wing	
5900th Wing; 5900th Composite Wing	Ramey AFB, Puerto Rico	CAirC	26 Jul 1948; 1 Oct 1948	1 Oct 1948; 1 Nov 1950	Replaced 24th Composite Wing; Replaced by 55th Strategic Reconnaissance Wing	
6000th Support Wing	Tokyo, Japan; Fuchu AS, Japan	FEAF, PACAF	8 Feb 1956; 1 May 1956	1 May 1956; 30 Jun 1961	Was 6000th Support Group. Replaced by 6100 Support Wing	
6002d Tactical Support Wing	Taegu AB, Korea; Ashiya AB Japan; Pusan East (K-9) Air Base, Korea; Pyongyang PRK; Suwon Air Base, Korea	FEAF	1 Aug 1950; 8 Aug 1950; 5 Sep 1950; 22 Nov 1950; 30 Nov 1950	8 Aug 1950; 5 Sep 1950; 22 Nov 1950; 30 Nov 1950; 1 Dec 1950	Forward Headquarters for 18th Fighter-Bomber Group. Replaced by 18th Fighter-Bomber Wing	
6013th Operations Wing (Northern Area)	Misawa AB, Japan	FEAF	c. 2 Nov 1951	1 May 1952	Replaced by 39th Air Division.	
6014th Operations Wing (Central Area)	Johnson AB, Japan(?)	FEAF	c. 2 Nov 1951	1 May 1952	Replaced by 40th Air Division.	
6015th Operations Wing (Southern Area)	Itazuke AB, Japan	FEAF	c. 2 Nov 1951	1 May 1952	Replaced by 43d Air Division.	
6016th Air Base Wing	Misawa AB, Japan	FEAF	10 Jul 1952	7 Nov 1953	Was 6016th Air Base Sq. Replaced by 49th ABG.	
6048th Air Base Wing	Haneda Airport, Japan	FEAF	1 Oct 1955	c. 30 Jun 1957	Replaced 1503d ABG. Redesignated 6048 ABG.	
6100th Air Base Wing; 6100th Support Wing	Tachikawa AB, Japan	FEAF, PACAF	c. 1 Jan 1961; 1 Jul 1961	1 Jul 1961; 31 Jul 1970	Replaced 2710 ABW and 6000 Support Wing. Redesignated 6100 ABG. in 1971. Replaced by 475th ABW.	
6100th Air Base Wing	Yokota AB, Japan	PACAF	15 May 1971	1 Nov 1971	Replaced 347th CSG. Replaced by 475th ABW.	
6101st Air Base Wing	Nagoya AB, Japan; Komaki AB, Japan	FEAF	c. 20 Aug 1948; 30 Jan 1956	30 Jan 1956 c. 15 Mar 1958	Replaced 29th Air Service Group. Both bases closed.	
6102d Air Base Wing	Yokota AB, Japan	PACAF	1 Jul 1957	8 Jan 1964	Replaced 35th ABG. Replaced by 441st CSG.	
6112th Air Base Wing	Misawa AB, Japan	PACAF	1 Oct 1978	1 Jul 1984	Replaced 6920th ABG. Replaced by 432d CSG.	
6122d Air Base Wing	Ashiya AB, Japan	FEAF	c. 1 Nov 1951	1 May 1952	Was 6122d ABG. Replaced by 403d ABG.	
6131st Tactical Support Wing	Pohang, Korea; Suwon Air Base, Korea; Kimpo AB, Korea; Pyongyang, PRK	FEAF	8 Aug 1950; 7 Oct 1950; 28 Oct 1950; 25 Nov 1950	7 Oct 1950; 28 Oct 1950; 25 Nov 1950; 1 Dec 1950	Forward Headquarters for 8th Fighter-Bomber Group. Replaced by 8th Fighter-Bomber Wing.	
6133d Tactical Support Wing	Iwakuni AB, Japan	FEAF	12 Aug 1950	1 Dec 1950	Forward Headquarters for 3d Bombardment Group. Replaced by 3d Bombardment Wing.	
6149th Tactical Support Wing	Iwakuni AB, Japan	FEAF	12 Aug 1950	1 Dec 1950	Forward Headquarters for 49th Fighter-Bomber Group, Replaced by 49th Fighter-Bomber Wing.	
6150th Tactical Support Wing	Tsuiki AB, Japan; Pohang, Korea; Yonpo Airfield, North Korea	FEAF	5 Sep 1950; 5 Oct 1950; 27 Nov 1950	5 Oct 50; 27 Nov 1950; 1 Dec 1950	Forward Headquarters for 35th Fighter-Interceptor Group. Replaced by 35th Fighter-Interceptor Wing.	
6160th Air Base Wing	Itazuke AB, Japan	FEAF	1 Dec 1950	20 Oct 1954	Replaced 8th ABG. Replaced by 8th ABG.	
6161st Air Base Wing	Yokota AB, Japan	FEAF	1 Dec 1950	1 Oct 1954	Replaced 3d ABG. Replaced by 35th ABG.	
6162d Air Base Wing	Johnson AB, Japan	FEAF	1 Dec 1950	c. 25 May 1951	Replaced 35th ABG. Replaced by 35th ABG.	
6163d Air Base Wing	Misawa AB, Japan	FEAF	1 Dec 1950	2 Nov 1951	Replaced 49th ABG. Replaced by 116th ABG.	
6171st Air Base Wing	Osan AB, Korea	FEAF	1 Nov 1954	18 Mar 1955	Replaced 18th ABG. Replaced by 58th ABG.	
6200th Air Base Wing	Clark AB, Philippines	FEAF	1 Dec 1950	1 Feb 1953	Replaced 18th ABG. Replaced by 6200th ABG.	
6200th Air Base Wing	Clark AB, Philippines	FEAF	5 Jan 1955	9 Apr 1959	Replaced 6200th ABG. Replaced by 405th ABG.	
6200th Materiel Wing; 6200th Air Base Wing	Clark AB, Philippines	PACAF	1 Apr 1965; 1 Aug 1968	1 Aug 1968; 31 Dec 1971	Replaced by 405th CSG.	
6208th Air Depot Wing	Clark AB, Philippines	PACAF	17 Dec 1949	1 Sep 1952	Replaced 24th Air Depot Wing. Replaced by 24th Air Depot Wing.	
Tactical Fighter Wing, Provisional, 6234th	Korat RTAFB, Thailand	PACAF	5 Apr 1965	8 Jul 1965	Replaced by 6234th TFW.	
6234th Tactical Fighter Wing	Korat RTAFB, Thailand	PACAF	8 Jul 1965	8 Apr 1966	Replaced TFW, P, 6234. Replaced by 388th TFW.	
6235th Tactical Fighter Wing	Takhli RTAFB, Thailand	PACAF	8 Jul 1965	8 Nov 1965	Replaced by 355th TFW.	
6251st Combat Support Wing; 6251st Tactical Fighter Wing	Bien Hoa AB, Viet Nam	PACAF	c. 8 Apr 1965 c. 8 Jul 1965	c. 8 Jul 1965; 8 Nov 1965	Replaced by 3d TFW.	
6252d Tactical Fighter Wing	Da Nang AB, Viet Nam	PACAF	8 Jul 1965	8 Apr 1966	Replaced by 35th TFW.	
6313d Air Base Wing	Kadena AFB, Okinawa	PACAF	1 Oct 1957	8 Dec 1964	Replaced 18th ABG. Replaced by 824th CSG.	
6314th Air Base Wing; 6314th Support Wing	Osan AB, South Korea	PACAF	25 Mar 1959; 1 Jul 1964	20 Jul 1961; 1 Nov 1971	Was 6314th ABG. 6314th ABG Jul 1961-Jul 1964. Replaced by 51st ABW.	
6319th Air Base Wing	Andersen AFB, Guam	FEAF	1 Jun 1953	1 Apr 1955	Replaced 19th ABG. Replaced by 3960 ABW when base transferred to SAC.	
6332d Station Wing; 6332d Air Base Wing	Kadena AB, Okinawa	FEAF	1 Apr 1949; 25 Jan 1950	25 Jan 1950; 1 May 1955	Replaced 32d ABG. Replaced by 18th ABG.	
6351st Air Base Wing	Naha AB, Okinawa	FEAF	26 Jun 1951	1 Aug 1954	Replaced 6302d ABG. Replaced by 51st ABG.	
6400th Air Depot Wing	Tachikawa AB, Japan	FEAF	1 Feb 1952	c. 1 Oct 1955	Replaced 13th Supply Group. Discontinued.	
6405th Air Support Wing (Materiel)	Taegu AB, Korea	FEAF	15 Mar 1952	1 Feb 1954	Was 6405th Korea Air Materiel Unit. Discontinued.	
6418th Air Depot Wing	Iwakuni AB, Japan	FEAF	1 Feb 1952	1 Sep 1953	Discontinued.	
6424th Air Depot Wing	Clark AB, Philippines	AAC	16 Feb 1954	25 Nov 1954	Replaced 24th Air Depot Wing. Discontinued.	
6441st Tactical Fighter Wing	Yokota AB, Japan	PACAF	1 Apr 1965	15 Nov 1966	Replaced by 347th TFW.	
6486th Air Base Wing	Hickam AFB, HI	FEAF	15 Oct 1954	1 Nov 1971	Was 1500th ABW. Replaced by 15th ABW.	
6498th Air Base Wing	Da Nang AB, Viet Nam	PACAF	27 Jun 1972	30 Jan 1973	Replaced 366th CSG. Base closed.	
6500th Air Base Wing; 6500th Support Wing	Edwards AFB, CA	AFSC, AFMC	by Oct 1988; 1 Aug 1991	1 Aug 1991; 1 Oct 1992	Redesignated 650th ABW.	
6502d Composite Wing	Hickam AFB, HI	Pacific Air Command	c. 1 Sep 1948	27 Jan 1949	Was Hickam Composite Wing. Replaced by 6506th Air Base Group.	
6510th Air Base Wing	Edwards AFB, CA	ARDC	25 Jun 1951	4 Oct 1954	Replaced 3079 ABG when base transferred from AMC. Replaced by 6510th ABG.	
6510th Test Wing	Edwards AFB, CA	AFSC	1 Mar 1978	2 Oct 1992	Redesignated 412th Test Wing	
6512th Test Wing	Edwards AFB, CA	AFSC	1 Oct 1969	1 Jan 1973	Was 6512th Test Group	
6520th Test Support Wing; 6520th Support Wing	L G Hanscom Field, MA	ARDC	1 Apr 1952 c. 1 Sep 1954	c. 1 Sep 1954; 1 Jul 1955	Discontinued.	
6530th Air Base Wing	Griffiss AFB, NY	ARDC	12 Jun 1951	1 Aug 1952	Replaced 3087th ABG. Replaced by 6530th ABG.	
6540th Missile Test Wing	Holloman AFB, NM	ARDC	c. 30 Jun 1951	1 Sep 1952	Was 2754th Experimental Wing. Redesignated 6580th Missile Test Wing.	
6541st Missile Test Wing	Patrick AFB, FL	ARDC	4 Sep 1951	c. 1 Mar 1953	Redesignated 6541st Operations Group (Range)	
6550th Air Base Wing	Patrick AFB, FL	ARDC	4 Sep 1951	1 Mar 1953	Replaced 6550th Air Base Squadron. Replaced by 6550th ABG.	
6550th Air Base Wing	Patrick AFB, FL	AFSC	1 Feb 1977	1 Mar 1981	Was 6550th ABG. Redesignated 6550th ABG.	
6550th Support Wing (Range)	Patrick AFB, FL	AFSC	1 Apr 1962	1 Mar1964	Replaced by Air Force Eastern Test Range.	
6555th Guided Missile Wing	Patrick AFB, FL	ARDC	May 1951	1954	Was 4800th Guided Missiles Wing. Redesignated 6555th Guided Missile Group.	
6555th Test Wing (Development); 6555th Aerospace Test Wing	Patrick AFB, FL	ARDC, AFSC	21 Dec 1959; 1 Nov 1961	1 Nov 1961; 1 Apr 1970	Was 6555th Guided Missile Group. Redesignated 6555th Aerospace Test Group, inactivated 1992. Redesignated as Space Delta 11, transferred from USAF to United States Space Force, and activated, in August 2021.	
6565th Test Wing (Development); 6565th Aerospace Test Wing	Vandenberg AFB, CA	ARDC	20 Oct 1960; 1 Nov 1961	1 Nov 1961; 1 Nov 1970	Redesignated 6565th Aerospace Test Group	
6580th Missile Test Wing	Holloman AFB, NM	ARDC	1 Sep 1952	10 Oct 1952	Was 6540th Missile Test Wing. Redesignated Holloman Air Development Center	
6580th Test Support Wing; 6580th Air Base Wing	Holloman AFB, NM	ARDC	1 Oct 1953; 1 Sep 1954	1 Sep 1954; 1 Feb 1955	Replaced by 6580th ABG.	
6592d Support Wing	Los Angeles AFS, CA	ARDC, AFSC	15 Jul 1961	27 Sep 1962	Was 6592d Support Group. Redesignated 6592d Support Group	
6594th Test Wing (Satellite); 6594th Aerospace Test Wing	Sunnyvale AFS, CA	ARDC, AFSC	6 Apr 1959; 1 Nov 1961	1 Nov 1961; 1 Jul 1965	Replaced by the Air Force Satellite Control Facility	
6595th Aerospace Test Wing	Vandenberg AFB, CA	ARDC, AFSC	1 Nov 1961	1 Oct 1979	Replaced by Western Space and Missile Test Center.	
6600th Air Depot Wing	Pepperrell AFB, Canada	NEAC	c. 1 Nov 1950	c. 5 Jun 1952	Replaced 1225th ABG when base transferred from MATS. Redesignated 6600th ABG.	
6602d Air Base Wing	Ernest Harmon AFB, Canada	NEAC	c. 1 Oct 1950	1 Aug 1952	Replaced 1226th ABG when base transferred from MATS. Redesignated 6602d ABG.	
6603d Air Base Wing	RCAF Goose Bay, Canada	NEAC	c. 19 Oct 1950	1 August 1952	Replaced 1227th ABG when base transferred from MATS. Redesignated 6603d Air Base Group.	
6604th Air Base Wing	Pepperrell AFB, Canada	NEAC	1 Jun 1954	1 Apr 1957	Was 6600th ABG. Transferred to ADC as 4737th ABW.	
6605th Air Base Wing	Ernest Harmon AFB, Canada	NEAC	1 Jun 1954	1 Apr 1957	Replaced 6602d ABG. Replaced by 4081st Strategic Wing when base transferred to SAC.	
6606th Air Base Wing	RCAF Goose Bay, Canada	NEAC	1 Jun 1954	1 Apr 1957	Replaced 6603d Air Base Group. Replaced by 4082d Air Base Group when base transferred to SAC.	
6607th Air Base Wing	Thule AB, Greenland	NEAC	1 Jun 1954	1 Apr 1957	Replaced by 4083d ABG when base transferred to SAC.	
6900th Security Wing	Landsberg AB, Germany; Frankfurt, Germany	USAFSS	1 Aug 1954	Unknown	Moved before July 1956	
6910th Electronic Security Wing	Lindsey AS, Germany	ESC	1 Jul 1981	15 Jul 1988	Replaced by 691st Electronic Security Wing.	
6910th Security Wing	Darmstadt, Germany	USAFSS	Unknown	1 Feb 1970	Redesignated 6910th Security Group.	
6920th Security Wing	Shiroi AS, Japan; Wheeler AFB, HI	USAFSS	Unknown; 1 Nov 1958	1 Nov 1958; Unknown	Replaced by Electronic Security Pacific.	
6920th Security Wing	Misawa AB, Japan	USAFSS	1 Feb 1976	1 Oct 1978	Replaced 6921st Security Wing. Support units replaced by 6112th Air Base Wing when base transferred to PACAF.	
6921st Security Wing	Misawa AB, Japan	USAFSS	1 Sep 1962	1 Feb 1976	Was 6921st Radio Group, Mobile. 6921st Security Group 1971–1972. Replaced by 6920th Security Wing.	
6922d Security Wing	Kadena AB, Okinawa; Clark AB, Philippines	USAFSS	c. 1 Jul 1963; 1 Jul 1965	1 Jul 1965 c. 28 Jan 1973	Was 6922d Radio Group, Mobile.	
6933d Security Wing	Karamursel AS, Turkey	USAFSS	c. 1 Jul 1963	c. 1 Apr 1970	Was 6933d Radio Group, Mobile. Redesignated 6933d Security Group.	
6940th Air Base Wing; 6940th Technical Training Wing; 6940th Security Wing	Goodfellow AFB, TX	USAFSS	1 Oct 1958 c. 1 Apr 1960 c.1 Jan 1964	c. 1 Apr 1960 c. 1 Jan 1964; 1 Jul 1978	Replaced 3545th ABG when base transferred from ATC.	
6940th Electronic Security Wing	Fort Meade, MD	ESC	1 Feb 1980	1 Oct 1991	Replaced by 694th Electronic Security Wing.	
6944th Security Wing	Offutt AFB, NE	USAFSS	1 Apr 1974	1 Mar 1979	Replaced by 6949th Security Squadron.	
6950th Security Wing	RAF Chicksands, UK	USAFSS	c. 1 Jul 1963	c. 1 Apr 1970	Was 6950th Radio Group, Mobile. Redesignated 6950th Security Group.	
6960th Electronic Security Wing	Kelly AFB, TX	ESC	1 Jan 1980	1 Oct 1986	Replaced by Continental Electronic Security Division.	
7000th Support Wing	Rhein-Main AB, Germany	USAFE	c. 19 May 1958	c. 1 Jul 1964	Was 7050th Air Intelligence Support Wing. Redesignated 7113th Special Activities Group.	
7020th Air Base Wing	RAF Fairford, UK	USAFE	1988	7 Feb 1990	Was 7020th ABG. Redesignated 7020th ABG	
7030th Air Base Wing; 7030th Combat Support Wing	Ramstein AB, Germany	USAFE	c. 1 Jul 1958; 15 Jul 1962	15 Jul 1962; 5 Oct 1966	Was 7030th Support Group; Replaced by 26th CSG.	
7050th Air Intelligence Service Wing	Wiesbaden Military Post, Germany; Rhein-Main AB, Germany	USAFE	16 Jun 1952; 3 Apr 1953	3 Apr 1953 c. 19 May 1958	Was 7050th Air Intelligence Service Squadron. Redesignated 7000th Support Wing.	
7100th Air Base Wing	Lindsey AS, Germany	USAFE	15 Nov 1959	24 Nov 1964	Replaced 7100 Support Group. Replaced by 7101st Air Base Wing.	
7100th Combat Support Wing	Lindsey AS, Germany	USAFE	15 Apr 1985	1 Jun 1993	Was 7100th ABG. Base transferred to US Army.	
7100th Headquarters Command Wing; 7100th Headquarters Support Wing; 7100th Support Wing	Lindsey AS, Germany	USAFE	1 Jul 1948; 26 Jun 1949 c. 1953	26 Jun 1949 c. 1953; 15 Nov 1959	Replaced Hq Command, USAFE.	
7101st Air Base Wing (USAFE Base Command)	Wiesbaden AB, Germany	USAFE	by 1 Jul 1958	1 Jun 1973	Replaced 7100 Support Group. Replaced by 601st CSG.	
7108th Tactical Wing	Chaumont AB, France	USAFE	11 Nov 1961	15 Aug 1962	Headquarters for elements of ANG 108th TFW mobilized for the Berlin Crisis. Replaced by 366th TFW.	
7117th Tactical Wing	Dreux AB, France	USAFE	11 Nov 1961	15 Aug 1962	Headquarters for elements of ANG 117th Tactical Reconnaissance Wing mobilized for the Berlin Crisis.	
7121st Tactical Wing	Etain AB, France	USAFE	24 Nov 1961	15 Aug 1962	Headquarters for elements of ANG 121st TFW mobilized for the Berlin Crisis.	
7122d Tactical Wing	Chambley AB, France	USAFE	7 Nov 1961	15 Aug 1962	Headquarters for elements of ANG 122d TFW mobilized for the Berlin Crisis.	
7131st Tactical Wing	Toul-Rosieres AB, France	USAFE	24 Nov 1961	15 Aug 1962	Headquarters for elements of ANG 131st TFW mobilized for the Berlin Crisis.	
7149th Tactical Fighter Wing	Spangdahlem AB, Germany	USAFE	1 Jul 1968	15 September 1969	Replaced 49th TFW.	
7150th AF Composite Wing	Wiesbaden Air Base, Germany	USAFE	1 Jul 1948	1 Oct 1949	Replaced 501st Air Service Group and 47th Station Complement Squadron. Replaced by 60th Troop Carrier Wing.	
7200th Air Force Depot Wing	Erding AB, Germany	USAFE	1 Jul 1948	25 Jul 1949	Replaced 43d Air Depot. Replaced by 85th Air Depot Wing.	
7272d Air Base Wing; 7272d Flying Training Wing	Wheelus Air Base, Libya	USAFE	1 Jan 1953; 1 Jul 1964	1 Jul 1964; 11 Jun 1970	Was 1603d Air Transport Wing. Discontinued when new Libyan government directed US forces to leave.	
7280th Air Depot Wing	Nouasseur AB, Morocco	USAFE	8 Jun 1953	1 Mar 1954	Replaced 80th Air Depot Wing. Replaced by 3153 ABW when base transferred to AMC.	
7300th AF Composite Wing	Fürstenfeldbruck AB, Germany	USAFE	1 Jul 1948	13 Aug 1948	Replaced 501st Air Service Group. Replaced by 36th Fighter Wing.	
7310th Air Base Wing; 7310th Tactical Airlift Wing	Rhein-Main AB, Germany	USAFE	15 May 1960; 23 Dec 1968	26 Dec 1964; 1 Jan 1970	Was 7310th ABG. 7310th ABG 1964-1958; Replaced by 322d Tactical Airlift Wing.	
7322d Air Base Wing	Chateauroux AS, France	USAFE	1 Jul 1962	26 Dec 1964	Replaced 3130 ABG when base transferred from AMC. Redesignated 7322d ABG.	
7330th Training Wing; 7330th Flying Training Wing	Fürstenfeldbruck AB, Germany	USAFE	1 Jun 1954; 15 Oct 1954	15 Oct 1954; 1 Feb 1958	Split into 7330 FTW, 7330 TTW, 7331 TTW. Base Transferred to German AF	
7330th Technical Training Wing	Fürstenfeldbruck AB, Germany	USAFE	15 Oct 1954	c. 15 Apr 1955	Base transferred to German AF.	
7331st Technical Training Wing	Kaufbeuren AB, Germany	USAFE	31 Dec 1954	c. 31 Dec 1956	Was 7331 Tech Training Group. Base transferred to German AF.	
7351st Flying Training Wing	Landsberg AB, Germany	USAFE	1 Oct 1955	c. 1 Jun 1957	Base transferred to German AF.	
7373d Air Depot Wing	Chateauroux AS, France	USAFE	c. 15 Nov 1953	c. 1 Jan 1956	Replaced 73d Air Depot Wing. Replaced by 3130th ABW when base transferred to AMC.	
Composite Wing, Provisional, 7440th Wing, Provisional 7440th	Incirlik AB, Turkey	USAFE	16 Jan 1991; 8 Aug 1996	8 Aug 1996; 15 Sep 1997	Operation Desert Storm and later operations. Replaced by 39th Air and Space Expeditionary Wing	
7445th Tactical Intelligence Wing	Ramstein AB, Germany	USAFE	1 Sep 1985	30 Sep 1994	Discontinued.	
7485th Air Depot Wing; 7485th Support Wing (Training)	Erding AB, Germany	USAFE	1 Dec 1953; 1 Apr 1956	1 Apr 1956; 15 May 1958	Replaced 85th Air Depot Wing. Discontinued and base transferred to German AF.	
7490th Wing (Provisional)	Aviano AB, Italy	USAFE	1 Jul 1995	11 Mar 1996	Replaced by 4190th Wing (P).	
7493d Special Investigations Wing	Wiesbaden AB, Germany	USAFE	by 1 Nov 1951	1 Jan 1963	Was 7493d IG Special Investigations Unit. Discontinued.	(Note: Prior to 1955, apparently 7493d Inspector General Special Investigations Wing.)
Tactical Fighter Wing, Provisional, 7499th	RAF Wethersfield, UK	USAFE	1 Apr 1970	1 Jul 1970	Replaced 20th TFW	
7502d Air Support Wing	RAF Sculthorpe, UK	USAFE	26 Sep 1950	16 May 51	Replaced by 3911th ABG when base transferred to SAC.	
7503d Air Support Wing	RAF Brize Norton, UK; Colliers End, UK	USAFE	25 May 1951; 1 Dec 52	1 Dec 52; 1 Mar 52	Redesignated 7503d Air Support Group	
7504th Air Support Wing	RAF Lakenheath, UK	USAFE	26 Sep 1950	16 May 51	Replaced by 3909th ABG when base transferred to SAC.	
7511th Air Support Wing	RAF Mildenhall, UK	USAFE	26 Sep 1950	16 May 51	Replaced by 3910th ABG when base transferred to SAC.	
7601st Air Base Wing	San Pablo AS, Spain	USAFE	c. 1 Jan 1956	1 Jan 1957	Replaced 3090th ABG when base transferred from AMC. Replaced by 7601 ABG.	
7602d Support Wing	Madrid, Spain	USAFE	1 Jan 1957	1 Jul 1957	Was 3090 Support Wing. Transferred to SAC as 3977th Support Wing.	
8500th Air Weather Wing	Andrews AFB, MD	CONAC	1 Sep 1949	23 Jun 1951	Called to active duty and personnel used as fillers.	
8600th Pilot Training Wing	Vance AFB, OK	CONAC	27 Jun 1949	28 May 1951	Called to active duty and personnel used as fillers.	
8601st Basic Pilot Training Wing; 8601st Pilot Training Wing	Randolph AFB, TX	CONAC	27 Jun 1949	28 May 1951	Called to active duty and personnel used as fillers.	
8602d Technical Training Wing	Scott AFB, IL	CONAC	10 Jun 1949	26 Apr 1951	Called to active duty and personnel used as fillers.	
8605th Technical Training Wing	Keesler AFB, MS	CONAC	26 Jun 1949	unknown	Redesignated 8635th Technical Training Wing.	
8635th Technical Training Wing	Keesler AFB, MS	CONAC	26 Jun 1949	unknown	Was 8605th Technical Training Wing. Called to active duty and personnel used as fillers.	
8706th Pilot Training Wing	Ellington AFB, TX	CONAC	15 Jun 1952	18 May 1955	Replaced 903d Reserve Training Wing. Replaced by 446th Troop Carrier Wing.	
8707th Pilot Training Wing	Brooks AFB, TX	CONAC	15 Jun 1952	18 May 1955	Replaced 907th Reserve Training Wing. Replaced by 433d Troop Carrier Wing.	
8708th Pilot Training Wing	Hensley Field, TX	CONAC	15 Jun 1952	18 May 1955	Replaced 904th Reserve Training Wing. Replaced by 448th Fighter-Bomber Wing.	
8710th Pilot Training Wing	Memphis MAP, TN	CONAC	13 Jun 1952	18 May 1955	Replaced 905th Reserve Training Wing. Replaced by 319th Fighter-Bomber Wing.	
8711th Pilot Training Wing	Scott AFB, IL	CONAC	15 Jun 1952	18 May 1955	Replaced 928th Reserve Training Wing. Replaced by 94th Bombardment Wing.	
9006th Volunteer Air Reserve Training Wing	Mitchel AFB(?)	CONAC	c. 1 Jun 1949	c. 30 Sep 1949	First AF unit.	
9007th Volunteer Air Reserve Training Wing	Mitchel AFB(?)	CONAC	c. 1 Jun 1949	c. 30 Sep 1949	First AF unit. Redesignated 9007th VART Group.	
9044th Volunteer Air Reserve Training Wing	Dobbins AFB, GA	CONAC	1 Nov 1949	27 Dec 1949		

Abbreviations: ABG=Air Base Group, ABW=Air Base Wing, CCTW=Combat Crew Training Wing, CSG=Combat Support Group, TFW=Tactical Fighter Wing, TTG=Technical Training Group

== See also ==
- List of USAF Provisional Wings assigned to Strategic Air Command
- List of United States Air Force strategic wings
- List of wings of the United States Air Force
- List of wings of the United States Army Air Forces
- List of Active Wings of the United States Air National Guard
