= 4620th Air Defense Wing =

Wing of the US Air Force (1955–1961)

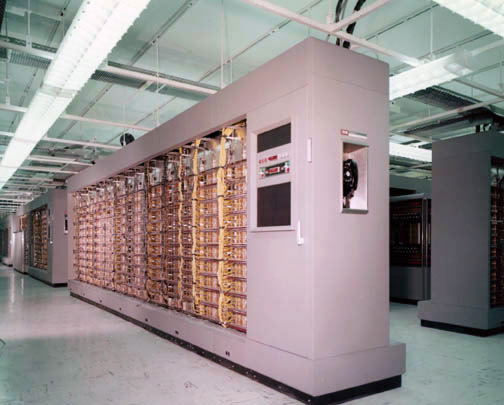
- AN/FSQ-7 SAGE computer
- Active: 1955–1961
- Country: United States
- Branch: United States Air Force
- Role: Experimental & training

The 4620th Air Defense Wing is a discontinued wing of the United States Air Force. Its last assignment was with Air Defense Command at Santa Monica, California, where it was discontinued in 1961. The wing was organized in 1955 to ensure that the Semi-Automatic Ground Environment (SAGE) air defense system, was compatible with ADC's operational requirements. It also performed operational testing and training on SAGE and earlier systems. Once SAGE started to become operational, the need for the wing no longer existed and it was discontinued, although one of its subordinate groups continued the SAGE training mission until 1962.

== History ==
The 4620th Air Defense Wing was established to implement the Semi-Automatic Ground Environment (SAGE) air defense system, a system of analog computer-equipped direction centers that could process information from ground radars, picket ships and ground observers onto a generated radar scope to create a composite picture of the emerging air battle. The wing was responsible to ensure that SAGE computer systems were based on approved operational concepts for air defense and provided guidance to operational units concerning the implementation, installation, testing, and utilization of SAGE computer programs. Until December 1958, the wing also provided training on the existing manual air defense control systems that were being replaced by SAGE.

The 4620th was originally located with MIT's Lincoln Laboratories, which had developed the SAGE system, to permit close coordination with the organization developing SAGE. In 1957, the 4620th Air Defense Group was organized at Richards-Gebaur Air Force Base, Missouri to manage programming and training for the SAGE system and was assigned to the wing. The wing moved to Santa Monica, California in 1958. Anticipating the wing move to Santa Monica, the 4620th Group was reassigned directly to ADC. On 15 September, the 4620th group was renumbered as the 4606th Air Defense Group, and continued with that designation until discontinued on 25 June 1962. The wing prepared the operational employment plan for integration of IM-99 Bomarc surface-to-air missiles into the SAGE system.

Preceded by extensive planning and testing of almost three years, the first SAGE air defense sector (New York) became operational on 26 June 1958. The first SAGE division (New York) became operational on 1 January 1959. As the SAGE system was becoming fully operational in 1961, the 4620th Wing had completed its mission and was discontinued.

== Lineage ==
- Designated and organized as 4620th Air Defense Wing (SAGE Experimental) on 1 June 1955

Discontinued on 1 February 1961

=== Assignments ===
- Air Defense Command, 1 June 1955 – 1 February 1961

=== Components ===
- 4620th Air Defense Group (SAGE Programming and Training), 8 May 1957 – 1 July 1958

Richards-Gebaur Air Force Base, Missouri

=== Stations ===
- Lexington, Massachusetts, 1 June 1955 – 8 August 1958
- Santa Monica, California, 8 August 1958 – 1 February 1961

=== Commanders ===
- Col. Robert J. Stevenson, by July 1958 – 24 June 1959
- Lt Col. George R. Kauffman, 24 June 1959 – 1 July 1959
- Col. Samuel C. Galbreath, 1 July 1959 – 1 February 1961

== See also ==
- List of MAJCOM wings
