= 4780th Air Defense Wing =

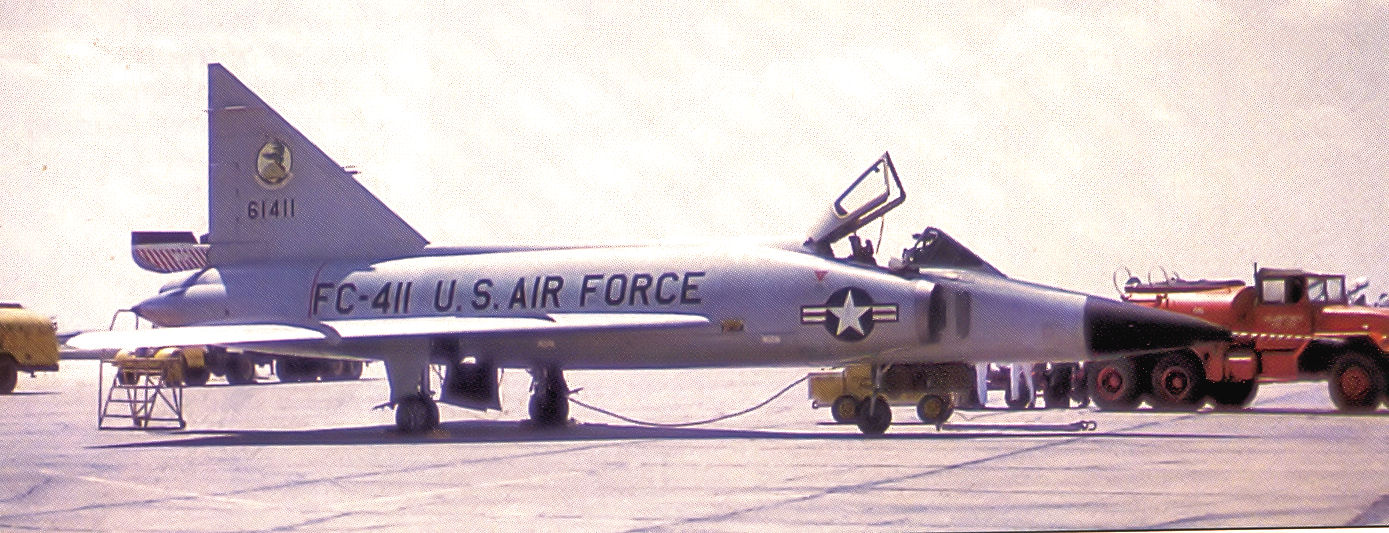
- Convair F-102 Delta Dagger at Perrin AFB, Texas (Note: Aircraft is Convair F-102A-75-CO Delta Dagger, serial 56-1411.)
- Active: 1962–1971
- Country: United States
- Branch: United States Air Force
- Role: Air defense fighter training
- Decorations: Air Force Outstanding Unit Award

Insignia
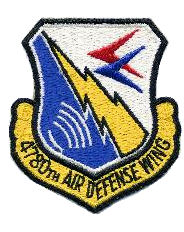
- Patch with 4780th Air Defense Wing emblem

The 4780th Air Defense Wing is a discontinued United States Air Force organization. Its last assignment was with the Air Defense Weapons Center at Perrin Air Force Base, Texas, where it was discontinued in 1971. The wing was organized in 1962 when Air Defense Command (ADC) assumed the interceptor pilot training mission from Air Training Command (ATC).

The 4780th assumed the personnel, equipment, and mission of ATC's 3555th Flying Training Wing, which was simultaneously discontinued. During the Cuban Missile Crisis, the wing maintained aircraft on alert in Texas and Florida. The wing was discontinued in 1971 when ADC concentrated all its fighter crew training at Tyndall Air Force Base, Florida. Between 1965 and 1969, the wing was twice awarded the Air Force Outstanding Unit Award for its mission performance,

== History ==
In 1958, Strategic Air Command and Tactical Air Command took responsibility from Air Training Command (ATC) for the conduct of their combat crew training. However, ATC's 3555th Flying Training Wing (Advanced Interceptor), which had trained all-weather interceptor pilots for all USAF commands, including Air Defense Command (ADC) since 1953, continued interceptor crew training. Most interceptor pilots trained at Perrin Air Force Base, however, were later assigned to ADC. In March 1962, ADC decided it wanted to merge Perrin's interceptor school with other air defense resources. ADC acquired Perrin from ATC on 1 July 1962 and with it the 3555th Wing and its three flying training squadrons. On that date, ADC discontinued the 3555th Wing and formed the 4780th Air Defense Wing (Training) with the 3555th's personnel and equipment. In addition to its operational squadrons, the wing was assigned a number of support and maintenance organizations to fulfill its role as USAF host organization for Perrin.

The 4780th trained qualified pilots to operate the Convair F-102 Delta Dagger and Convair F-106 Delta Dart interceptor aircraft as combat weapons. In addition, it conducted lead-in training with the F-102 for F-106 Delta Dart and Convair B-58 Hustler. From 1962 to 1971 Perrin had the largest fleet of F-102 Delta Daggers in the US Air Force. Perrin was the only F-102 training base within ADC. The wing conducted a water survival skills school on nearby Lake Texoma, whose graduates included seventeen astronauts.

In October 1962 during the Cuban Missile Crisis the wing suspended its training mission and placed all its interceptor aircraft on five-minute alert, some flying missions to Florida.

The wing was awarded two Air Force Outstanding Unit Awards for its performance from 1965 through 1969. In addition, elements of the wing earned a third award for the period from January 1969 through May 1970, In 1969, the 4780th won the United States Air Force Flying Safety Plaque for flying 38,551 hours without a major accident. On 3 March 1971, it was announced that Perrin would close. On 13 May 1971 the last graduating class flew its F-102s in formation over Sherman and Denison, Texas as a farewell to its two host cities. A few days later the last of the Delta Daggers left the base, and the wing' was discontinued.

=== Lineage ===
- Designated as the 4780th Air Defense Wing (Training) and organized on 1 July 1962

Discontinued on 30 June 1971

=== Assignments ===
- 73d Air Division, 1 July 1962
- Fourteenth Air Force, 1 April 1966
- Tenth Air Force, 1 July 1968
- Air Defense Weapons Center, 15 November 1969 – 30 June 1971

=== Stations ===
- Perrin Air Force Base, Texas, 1 July 1962 – 30 June 1971

=== Components ===
Group

- 4780th Air Base Group, 1 July 1962 – 30 June 1971

Operational Squadrons

- 4780th Flying Training Squadron (later 4780th Air Defense Squadron), 1 July 1962 – 30 June 1971
- 4781st Flying Training Squadron (later 4781st Combat Crew Training Squadron), 1 July 1962–31 Dec 1969
- 4782nd Combat Crew Training Squadron, 1 July 1962 – 30 June 1971

Maintenance Squadrons

- 4780th Armament & Electronics Maintenance Squadron (later 4780th Communications & Electronics Maintenance Squadron, 4780th Avionics Maintenance Squadron), 1 January 1963 – 30 June 1971
- 4780th Consolidated Aircraft Maintenance Squadron, 1 July 1962 – 1 January 1963
- 4780th Field Maintenance Squadron, 1 January 1963 – 30 June 1971
- 4780th Munitions Maintenance Squadron, 15 September 1966 – 30 June 1971
- 4780th Organizational Maintenance Squadron, 1 January 1963 – 30 June 1971

Other

- 4780th USAF Hospital (later 4780th USAF Dispensary) 1 July 1962 – 8 October 1970
- USAF Dispensary, Perrin, 8 October 1970 – 30 June 1971
- 4780th Physiological Training Flight, ca. 1 July 1962 – 1 Jan 1969

=== Aircraft ===
- F-102A, 1962–1971
- TF-102A, 1962–1971
- T-33A, 1962–1971
- T-37B 1965–1971
- HH-43B 1965–1971

=== Commanders ===
- Col. Raymond K. Gallagher, 1 July 1962 – unknown
- Col. John R. Kullman, 7 August 1964 – unknown
- Col. R. H. Dettre, unknown – 30 June 1967
- Col. Walter R, Hardee Jr., 30 June 1967 – 15 June 1969
- Col. Vermont Garrison, 16 June 1969 – 30 Jun 1971

=== Awards ===
Award streamer	Award	Dates	Notes
	Air Force Outstanding Unit Award	1 July 1965–30 June 1967	
	Air Force Outstanding Unit Award	1 July 1967–15 January 1969	

== See also ==
- List of MAJCOM wings of the United States Air Force
