= 3973d Strategic Wing =

- Active: 1964–1966
- Country: United States
- Branch: United States Air Force
- Type: Host base unit
- Role: Support SAC bombardment units
- Part of: Sixteenth Air Force
- Garrison/HQ: Moron Air Base, Spain

The 3973d Strategic Wing (3973d SW) is an inactive United States Air Force unit, discontinued at Moron Air Base, Spain in 1966. It was established in 1957 to support forward deployed elements of Strategic Air Command (SAC) (Reflex) and added support of Boeing B-52 Stratofortress Operation Chrome Dome missions, which continued after Operation Reflex operations ended. It was discontinued when its parent Sixteenth Air Force was transferred to United States Air Forces Europe (USAFE) after the Chrome Dome mission ended in Spain.

== History ==
The 3973d SW was a support element for the SAC originally for SAC Boeing B-47 Stratojet wing and support elements deployed to Moron AB from United States bases Operation Reflex and later Operation Chrome Dome operations between 1 June 1957 and 15 April 1966. When activated as the 3973d Air Base Squadron, it assumed the resources (Manpower, Equipment, Weapons, & Facilities) of the 7605th Air Base Squadron, a USAFE unit that had opened Moron. Throughout its existence it was controlled by SAC at Moron AB.

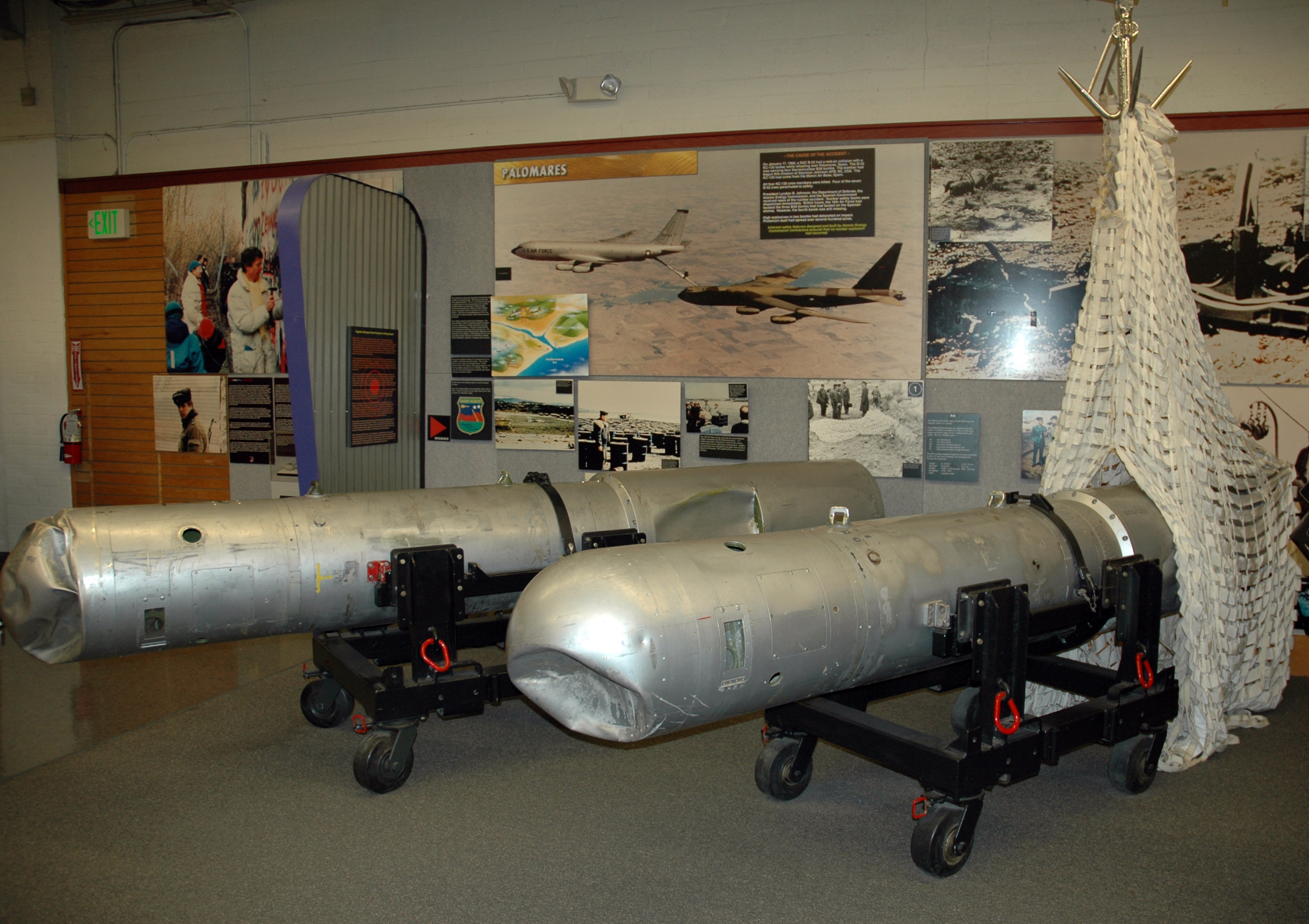
Bombs recovered from B-52 crash near Palomares, Spain

The wing originated as the 3973d Air Base Squadron on 1 January 1957, replacing the 7605th Air Base Squadron of United States Air Forces Europe, which had opened Moron AB for United States Air Force use. The wing trained and equipped personnel at Moron as well as supported Operation Chrome Dome operations with Boeing KC-135 Stratotanker refueling B-52 Stratofortress aircraft. On 4 February 1965 REeflex operations for Boeing B-47 Stratojet aircraft ended and the wing focused on other missions. Chrome Dome operations terminated on 23 January 1966 at the request of the Spanish government, following the crash of a B-52 near Palomares

B-58 Hustler aircraft deployed from the 43d Bombardment Wing at Carswell AFB, Texas arrived at Moron 22 July 1964 for Alarm Bell operational training, remaining on station until September.

The wing inactivated on 15 April 1966 when Moron AB transferred from SAC to United States Air Forces in Europe. The unit was replaced by the 7473d Combat Support Group under USAFE. SAC retained a tanker presence at Moron, but its mission was refueling USAFE fighter aircraft.

== Lineage ==
- Designated as the 3973d Air Base Squadron and organized on 1 June 1957
- Redesignated 3973d Air Base Group on 1 April 1958
- Redesignated 3973d Combat Support Group on 1 May 1959
- Redesignated 3973d Strategic Wing on 1 February 1964
- Discontinued on 15 April 1966

=== Assignment ===
- Sixteenth Air Force, 1 June 1957 – 15 April 1966

=== Station ===
- Moron Air Base, Spain, 1 June 1957 – 15 April 1966

=== Components ===
- 870th Medical Group, 1 April 1958 – 15 April 1966
- 15th Aviation Depot Squadron, 17 June 1958 – 30 April 1965
- 3973d USAF Dispensary, 1 June 1957 – 1 April 1958
- 3973d Air Police Squadron (later 3973d Combat Defense Squadron), 1 April 1958 – 15 April 1966
- 3973d Consolidated Aircraft Maintenance Squadron (later 3973d Field Maintenance Squadron), 1 April 1958 – 15 April 1966
- 3973d Installations Squadron (later 3973d Civil Engineering Squadron), 1 April 1958 – 15 April 1966
- 3973d Materiel Squadron, 1 April 1958 – 1 February 1964
- 3973d Operations Squadron, 1 January 1959 – 1 February 1964
- 3973d Supply Squadron, 1 April 1958 – 15 April 1966
- 3973d Transportation Squadron, 1 April 1958 – 15 April 1966
