= 95th Fighter Squadron =

95th Fighter Squadron

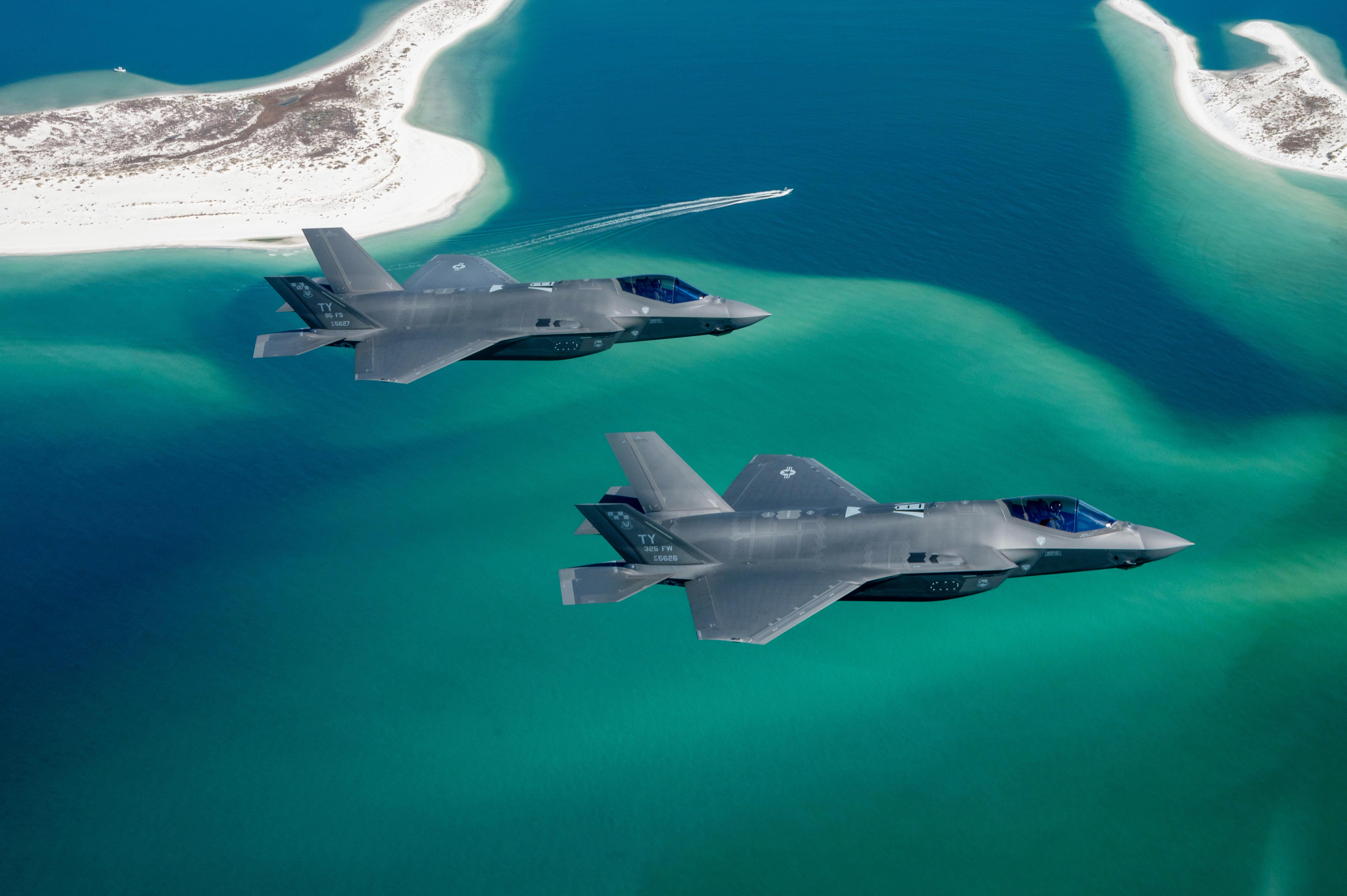
- 95th Fighter Squadron F-35A Lightning IIs
- Active: 1942–1945; 1947–1949; 1952–1973; 1974–2010; 2013–2019; 2023–present
- Country: United States
- Branch: United States Air Force
- Role: Fighter
- Part of: Air Combat Command: Fifteenth Air Force; 325th Fighter Wing; 325th Operations Group
- Nickname: Boneheads
- Motto: Death with Finesse
- Mascot: Mr. Bones
- Engagements: European Theater of Operations Mediterranean Theater of Operations
- Decorations: Distinguished Unit Citation; Air Force Outstanding Unit Award

Insignia
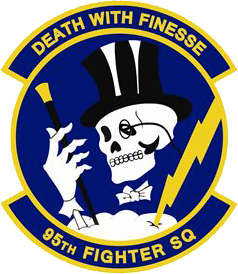
- 95th Fighter Squadron Emblem (approved 4 February 1954) (Note: This emblem was based on a design used by the squadron during World War II. Watkins, p. 34)

The 95th Fighter Squadron (95th FS), nicknamed the Boneheads, is an active squadron of the United States Air Force. Last activated on 15 June 2023 as a Lockheed Martin F-35 squadron stationed at Tyndall Air Force Base, Florida. Previously the 95 FS was an F-22 equipped squadron, but in 2019 the squadron's aircraft and personnel were distributed across other bases in the aftermath of Hurricane Michael in 2018 and its destruction of large parts of Tyndall Air Force Base. It was subsequently disbanded in 2019, but the 95th Fighter Squadron was reactivated at Tyndall AFB in June 2023. In August 2023, the unit received its first Lockheed Martin F-35A Lightning II aircraft.

The 95th flew combat in the European Theater of Operations and the Mediterranean Theater of Operations between 25 December 1942 and 3 May 1945. It flew fighter escort and air defense from 1947 to 1949 and air defense from 1952 to 1973. Between 1988 and 2010 it conducted advanced fighter training for the McDonnell Douglas F-15C/D Eagle.

== History ==
=== World War II ===
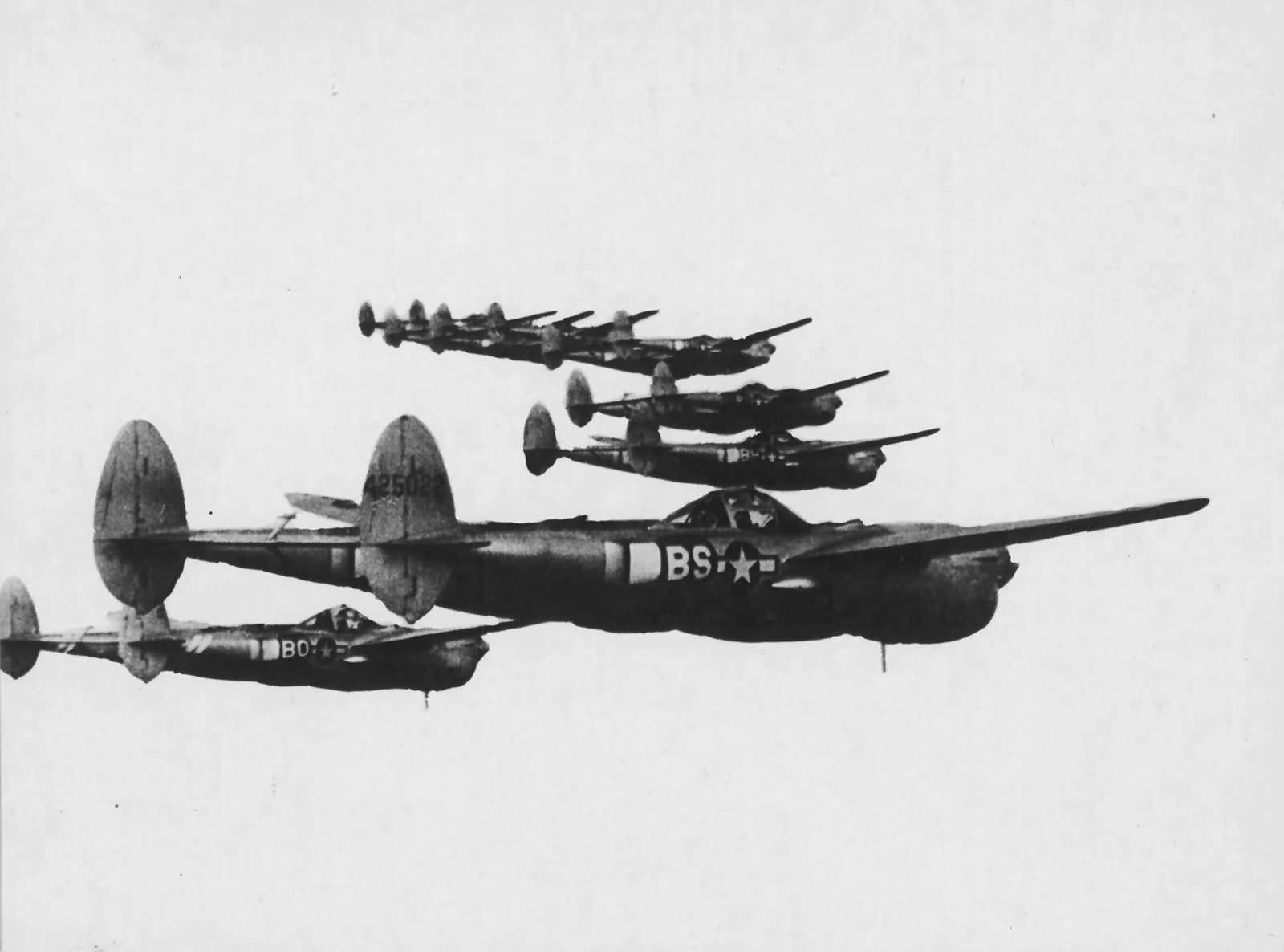
P-38 Lightnings of the 82nd Fighter Group over Italy, 1944

The squadron was activated in early 1942 at Harding Field, Louisiana as the 95th Pursuit Squadron, one of the original three squadrons of the 82d Pursuit Group. It soon moved to California where it equipped with Lockheed P-38 Lightnings and began training with Fourth Air Force as the 95th Fighter Squadron. It left California in the fall and sailed for Northern Ireland, where it received additional combat training under Eighth Air Force. A month after the initial Operation Torch landings in North Africa the squadron deployed to Algeria, where it entered combat as an element of Twelfth Air Force.

In North Africa, the squadron flew antisubmarine patrols, bomber escort missions and attacked enemy shipping and airfields, moving its base east through Algeria and Tunisia. As the North African campaign drew to a close, the unit began attacking targets in Italy, earning a Distinguished Unit Citation for its actions on 25 April 1943 during an attack on enemy airfields in Foggia. On this mission, the squadron's aircraft flew hundreds of miles at an altitude of 100 feet to destroy dozens of enemy aircraft at Foggia while suffering minimal losses,

In May 1943, the 95th was tasked with bombing Pantellaria, supporting the Allied invasion of Sicily. In part due to the squadron's efforts the garrison surrender just prior to the Allies landing on the island. In September, the squadron participated in Operation Husky, the invasion of Sicily, during which it was awarded a second Distinguished Unit Citation for a bomber escort mission against marshalling yards near Naples. In this mission the squadron protected 72 North American B-25 Mitchells without loss while destroying numerous attacking enemy fighters.

The squadron moved to Italy, where it became part of Fifteenth Air Force as part of the buildup to provide fighter cover for Fifteenth's heavy bombers. On 10 June 1944 the squadron earned a third Distinguished Unit Citation for its actions during an attack on oil refineries in Ploiești, Romania. During this attack each aircraft carried a 1,000-pound bomb and a 300-gallon gas tank. The squadron also took part in some of the first shuttle missions to the Soviet Union.

At the end of World War II, the 95th destroyed more than 400 aircraft including 199 air-to-air kills and had seven aces. Following the surrender of Germany, the squadron remained in Italy until September 1945, when it was inactivated

=== Strategic Air Command ===
In 1947 the squadron was again activated at Grenier Field, New Hampshire, where it was equipped with North American P-51 Mustangs as a Strategic Air Command fighter escort unit. Between April and June 1948 the squadron deployed to Ladd Air Force Base, Alaska, where it practiced rendezvousing with and escorting bombers, intercepting simulated enemy bombers and aerial gunnery. In August 1949 it was transferred to Continental Air Command and its primary role became air defense, but this mission change was brief, for the squadron was inactivated in October.

=== Air Defense ===
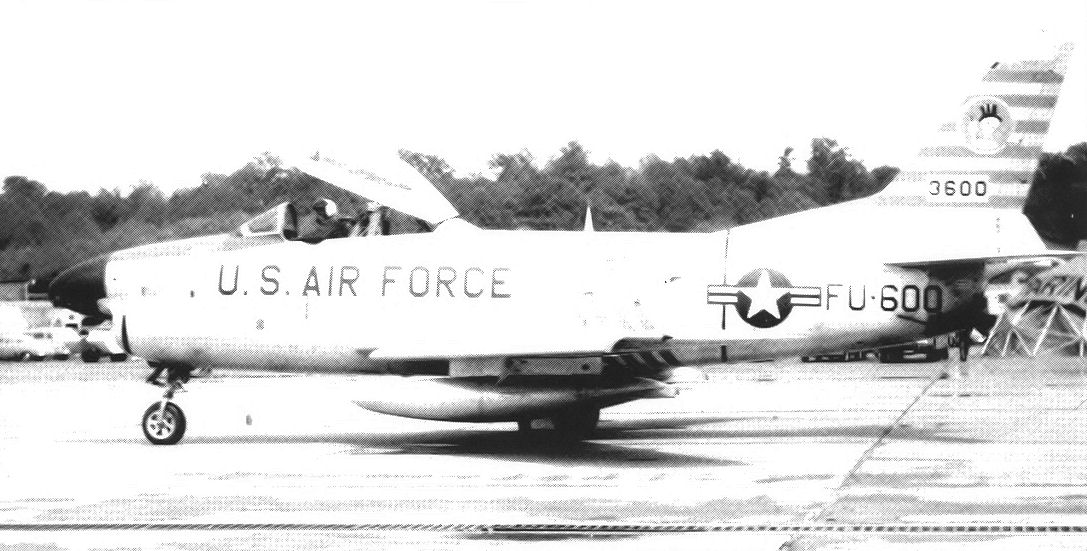
95th FIS F-86D Sabre 53-600, Andrews AFB, 1955

In late 1952, the squadron, now designated the 95th Fighter-Interceptor Squadron, was activated under Air Defense Command (ADC) and assigned to the 4710th Defense Wing. It was stationed at Andrews Air Force Base, Maryland, where it replaced the federalized 121st Fighter-Interceptor Squadron, which was returned to the control of the District of Columbia Air National Guard. The 95th took over the personnel, mission, and Lockheed F-94 Starfire aircraft of the inactivating 121st. The squadron was tasked with defending Washington, D.C., and the surrounding area against the threat of crewed bomber attacks.

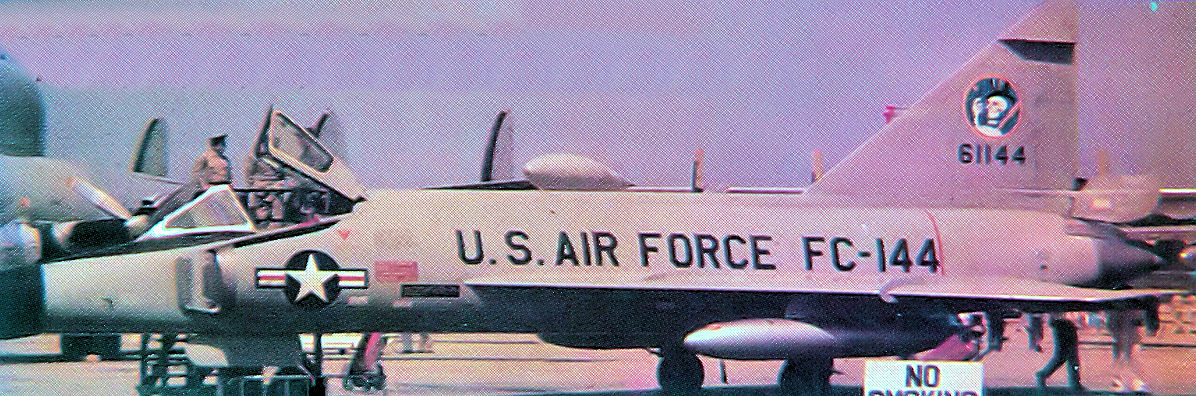
95 FIS Convair F-102A Delta Dagger 56–1144, Summer 1958

In May 1953 the squadron replaced its cannon armed F-94Bs with Mighty Mouse rocket armed North American F-86D Sabres. In 1956, as ADC prepared to upgrade its system to the Semi-Automatic Ground Environment (SAGE), the 4710th wing was discontinued and the squadron was reassigned to the 85th Air Division. In 1957, the squadron replaced its Sabres with the F-86L model, which was equipped with data link to receive commands directly from the SAGE combat direction center without using voice radio.

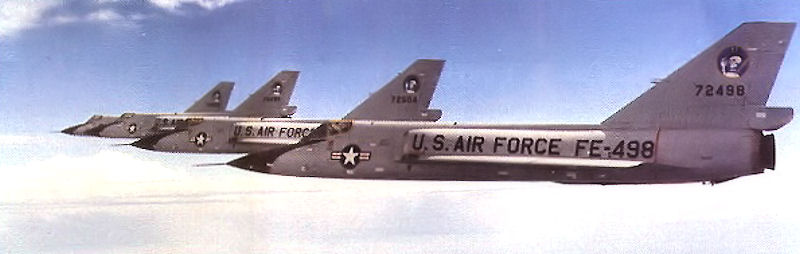
95th FIS 4 ship formation about 1960 (Note: Note the Andrews AFB tail marking of Mr Bones in a circle)

The squadron's F-86L period lasted only a few months, however, for it converted to AIM-4 Falcon armed Convair F-102 Delta Daggers in February 1958. A final interceptor upgrade occurred in September 1959 when the unit became operational with the Convair F-106 Delta Dart. On 22 October 1962, before President John F. Kennedy told Americans that missiles were in place in Cuba, the squadron dispersed one third of its force, equipped with nuclear tipped missiles to Atlantic City International Airport at the start of the Cuban Missile Crisis. These planes returned to Andrews after the crisis.

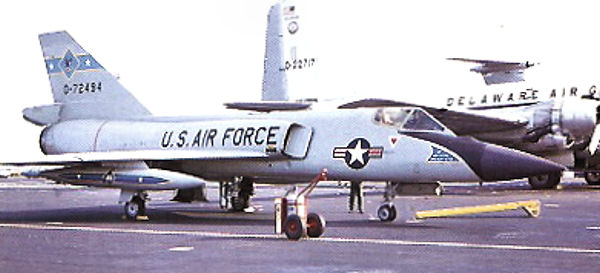
F-106 57–2494 at Dover AFB about 1970 (Note: When the squadron moved to Dover AFB in 1963, it assumed a new tail insignia of a blue flash with Mr Bones in a Diamond.)

In July 1963 the squadron moved to Dover Air Force Base, Delaware, where its F-106s replaced the McDonnell F-101 Voodoos of the 98th Fighter-Interceptor Squadron. which moved from Dover to Suffolk County Air Force Base the preceding month. The 95th maintained a 24-hour alert status at both Dover, while its Detachment 1 did so at Atlantic City International Airport, New Jersey. Its F-106 aircraft could be called to action and within minutes, be airborne fully loaded and armed with nuclear missiles.

In 1968, following the Pueblo Incident, The Air Force tasked ADC to provide alert F-106s at Osan Air Base, Korea. Following the 1969 EC-121 shootdown incident, the deployed F-106s began flying escort missions for EC-121s. In November 1969, the squadron deployed to Korea to assume this duty. relieving the 94th Fighter-Interceptor Squadron. In May 1970, this tasking ended and the unit returned to Dover.

=== Fighter training ===
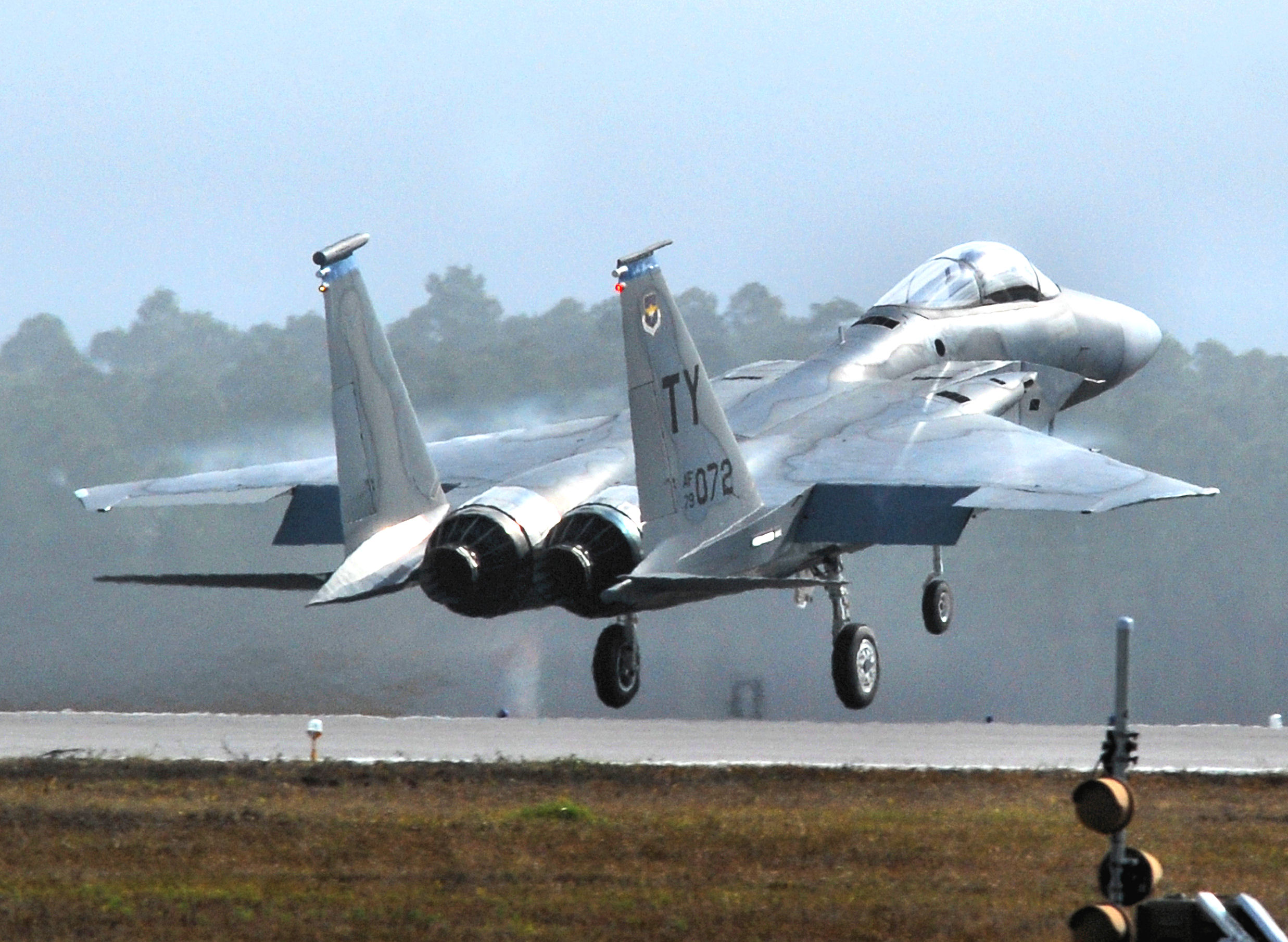
95th Fighter Squadron F-15 Eagle takes off from Tyndall Air Force Base, 2010

The squadron was activated at Tyndall Air Force Base on 15 August 1974, as the 95th Fighter Interceptor Training Squadron. Upon arrival at Tyndall, the 95th transitioned from the F-106 to the T-33 Shooting Star, where they flew in support of Tyndall's Weapons Controller (now known as Air Battle Manager) training program. They also provided training to pilots newly assigned to the T-33 as well as drone chase support for the Air Force's Weapons System Evaluation Program at Tyndall. The 95th FITS was the last active USAF unit to operate the T-33, affectionately known by its crews as the "T-Bird". In 1988, the 95th retired its last T-Birds and gained the mission of providing combat crew training for pilots flying the McDonnell Douglas F-15 Eagle. At this time, the 95th was redesignated the 95th Tactical Fighter Training Squadron. In 1991, the 95th was redesignated the 95th Fighter Squadron, which remained the squadron's designation until the time of its inactivation in September 2010.

Though the 95th's mission was air dominance training, and was not an operational squadron, during Operation Noble Eagle, the 95th Fighter Squadron generated combat-configured McDonnell Douglas F-15 Eagles and flew combat air patrol missions over cities in the southeastern United States. However, the F-15 was aging and reduced budgets led to the Air Force to retire all F-15A/B and a portion of F-15C/D model aircraft and inactivate F-15C/D training units in the Regular Air Force and move the F-15C/D training mission to the Air National Guard. As a result, the squadron was inactivated in September 2010.

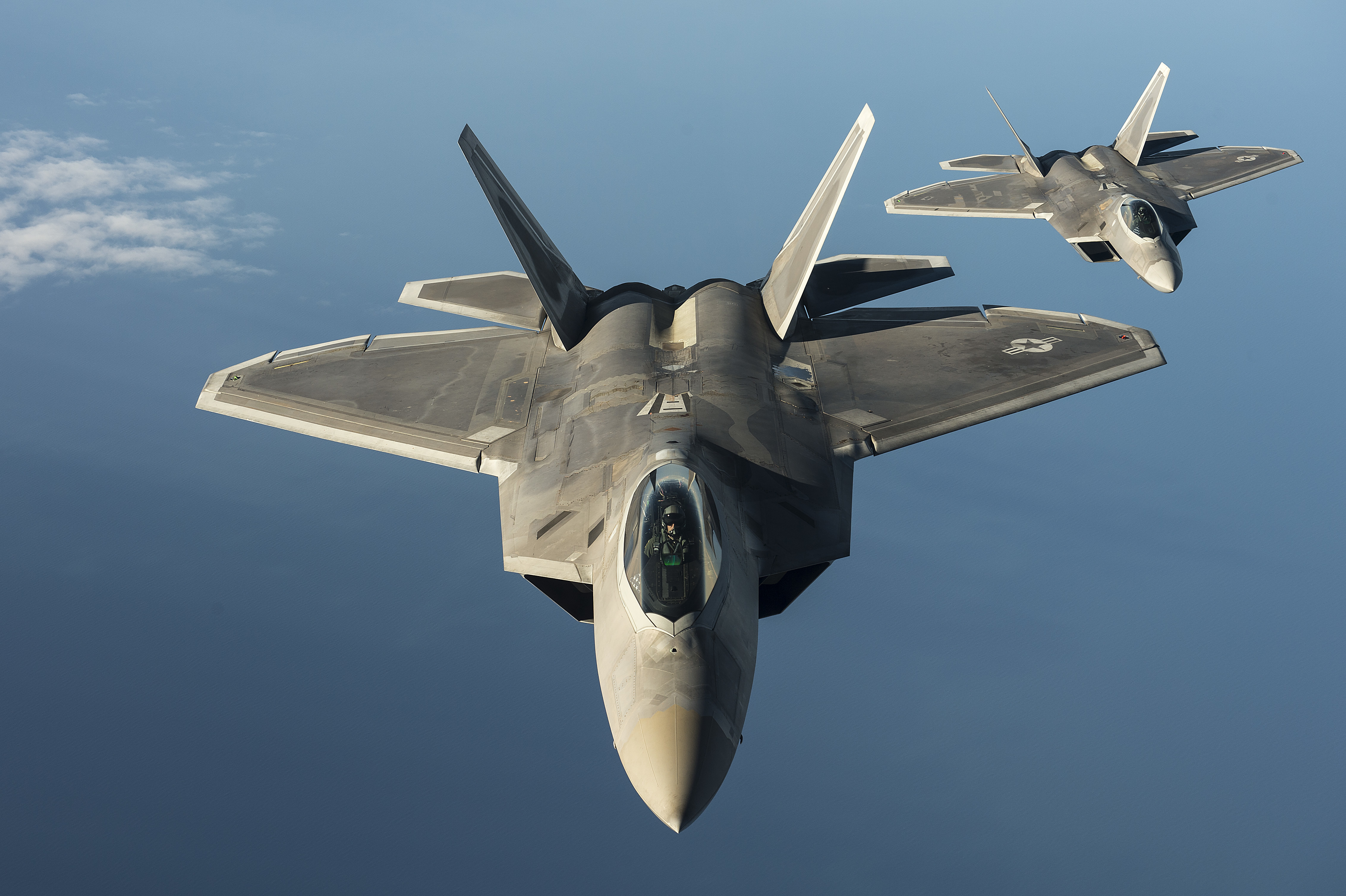
F-22 Raptors from the 95th Fighter Squadron fly over the Baltic Sea, 2015

=== F-22A Raptor (2013–2019) ===
The squadron was activated once again in October 2013 at Tyndall as a combat-coded Lockheed Martin F-22 Raptor unit. The unit received aircraft from the 7th Fighter Squadron at Holloman Air Force Base beginning in January 2014. The 95th completed acceptance of its fleet and gained initial operational capability in April 2014.

In October 2018, large parts of Tyndall Air Force Base were damaged by Hurricane Michael. Subsequently, Tyndall's flying units were relocated to other bases, with the 2nd Fighter Training Squadron and 43rd Fighter Squadron being relocated to Eglin Air Force Base, Florida, while the aircraft and personnel of the 95th Fighter Squadron were split up and relocated to Joint Base Elmendorf–Richardson, Alaska, Joint Base Langley–Eustis, Virginia, and Joint Base Pearl Harbor–Hickam, Hawaii. The squadron was disbanded in 2019.

=== F-35A Lightning II (2023–present) ===
The 95th Fighter Squadron reactivated at Tyndall AFB in June 2023 as the first of three units to be stationed at the base with the Lockheed Martin F-35A Lightning II. The first three F-35As (18-5416, 20-5626 and 20-5627) were delivered to the 95th FS on 1 August 2023.

== Lineage ==
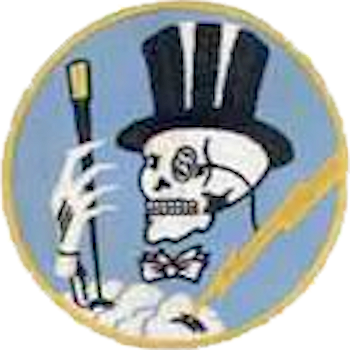
95th Fighter-Interceptor Squadron – Emblem

- Constituted as the 95th Pursuit Squadron (Interceptor) on 13 January 1942

Activated on 9 February 1942
Redesignated 95th Pursuit Squadron (Interceptor)(Twin Engine) on 22 April 1942
Redesignated 95th Fighter Squadron (Twin Engine) on 15 May 1942
Redesignated 95th Fighter Squadron, Two Engine on 28 February 1944
Inactivated on 9 September 1945

- Activated on 12 April 1947

Redesignated 95th Fighter Squadron, Single Engine on 15 August 1947
Inactivated on 2 October 1949

- Redesignated 95th Fighter-Interceptor Squadron on 11 September 1952

Activated on 1 November 1952
Inactivated on 31 January 1973

- Redesignated 95th Fighter-Interceptor Training Squadron on 15 August 1974

Activated on 1 September 1974
Redesignated: 95th Tactical Fighter Training Squadron on 1 April 1988
Redesignated: 95th Fighter Squadron on 1 November 1991
Inactivated on 21 September 2010

- Activated on 11 October 2013

Inactivated in 2019

- Activated on 15 June 2023

=== Assignments ===
- 82d Fighter Group: 9 February 1942 – 9 September 1945
- 82d Fighter Group: 12 April 1947 – 2 October 1949
- 4710th Defense Wing (later 4710th Air Defense Wing): 1 November 1952
- 85th Air Division: 1 March 1956
- Washington Air Defense Sector: 1 September 1958
- New York Air Defense Sector: 1 July 1963
- 21st Air Division: 1 April 1966 (attached to Fifth Air Force ADVON (Note: "ADVON" refers to the Advanced Echelon) after 15 November 1969)
- 20th Air Division: 19 November 1969 – 31 January 1973 (attached to 5th Air Force ADVON until c. 1 May 1970)
- Air Defense Weapons Center: 1 September 1974
- 325th Fighter Weapons Wing (later 325th Tactical Training Wing): 1 July 1981
- 325th Operations Group: 1 September 1991 – 21 September 2010
- 325th Operations Group: 11 October 2013 – 2019; 15 June 2023–present

=== Stations ===
- Harding Field, Louisiana, 9 February 1942
- Muroc Army Air Field, California, 30 April 1942
- Mines Field, California, 20 May 1942 – 16 September 1942
- RAF Eglinton,(Station 344) Northern Ireland, 3 October 1942
- Tafaraoui Airport, Algeria, 24 December 1942
- Telergma Airfield, Algeria, 1 January 1943
- Berteaux Airfield, Algeria, 28 May 1943
- Souk-el-Arba Airfield, Tunisia, 13 June 1943
- Grombalia Airfield, Tunisia, 4 August 1943
- San Pancrazio Airfield, Italy, 3 October 1943
- Lecce Airfield, Italy, 10 October 1943
- Vincenzo Airfield, Italy, 11 January 1944
- Lesina Airfield, Italy, c. 30 August 1945 – 9 September 1945
- Grenier Field (later Grenier Air Force Base), New Hampshire, 12 April 1947 – 2 October 1949

deployed to Ladd Air Force Base, Alaska, 4 April 1948 – 29 June 1948

- Andrews Air Force Base, Maryland, 1 November 1952
- Dover Air Force Base, Delaware, 1 July 1963 – 31 January 1973

Deployed to Osan Air Base, South Korea, 15 November 1969 – c. 1 May 1970

- Tyndall Air Force Base, Florida, 1 September 1974 – 21 September 2010
- Tyndall Air Force Base, Florida, 11 October 2013 – unknown
- Joint Base Elmendorf–Richardson, Alaska, November 2018 – unknown
- Joint Base Langley–Eustis, Virginia, November 2018 – unknown
- Joint Base Pearl Harbor–Hickam, Hawaii, November 2018 – unknown
- Tyndall Air Force Base, Florida, 15 June 2023 – present

=== Detachment ===
- Detachment 1, Atlantic City International Airport, New Jersey, unknown

=== Aircraft ===
- Lockheed P-38 Lightning (1942–1945)
- North American F-51 Mustang (1947–1949)
- Lockheed F-94B Starfire (1952–1953)
- North American F-86D Sabre (1953–1957)
- North American F-86L Sabre (1957–1958)

- Convair F-102 Delta Dagger (1958–1959)
- Convair F-106 Delta Dart (1959–1972)
- Lockheed T-33 Shooting Star (1974–1988)
- McDonnell Douglas F-15C/D Eagle (1988–2010)
- Lockheed Martin F-22A Raptor (2013–2019)
- Lockheed Martin F-35A Lightning II (2023–present)

=== Awards and campaigns ===
Award streamer	Award	Dates	Notes
	Distinguished Unit Citation	25 April 1943	95th Fighter Squadron, Italy
	Distinguished Unit Citation	2 September 1943	95th Fighter Squadron, Italy
	Distinguished Unit Citation	10 June 1944	95th Fighter Squadron, Ploiești, Romania
	Air Force Outstanding Unit Award	1 July 1976-30 Jun 1977	95th Fighter Interceptor Training Squadron
	Air Force Outstanding Unit Award	1 July 1977-30 June 1979	95th Fighter Interceptor Training Squadron
	Air Force Outstanding Unit Award	1 July 1981-31 March 1983	95th Fighter Interceptor Training Squadron
	Air Force Outstanding Unit Award	1 June 1983-31 May 1985	95th Fighter Interceptor Training Squadron

Campaign Streamer	Campaign	Dates	Notes
	Air Offensive, Europe	3 October 1942 – 5 June 1944	95th Fighter Squadron
	Tunisia	24 December 1942 – 13 May 1943	95th Fighter Squadron
	Sicily	14 May 1943 – 17 August 1943	95th Fighter Squadron
	Naples-Foggia	18 August 1943 – 21 January 1944	95th Fighter Squadron
	Rome-Arno	22 January 1944 – 9 September 1944	95th Fighter Squadron
	Normandy	6 June 1944 – 24 July 1944	95th Fighter Squadron
	Northern France	25 July 1944 – 14 September 1944	95th Fighter Squadron
	Southern France	15 August 1944 – 14 September 1944	95th Fighter Squadron
	North Apennines	10 September 1944 – 4 April 1945	95th Fighter Squadron
	Rhineland	15 September 1944 – 21 March 1945	95th Fighter Squadron
	Central Europe	22 March 1944 – 21 May 1945	95th Fighter Squadron
	Po Valley	3 April 1945 – 8 May 1945	95th Fighter Squadron
	Air Combat, EAME Theater	3 October 1942 – 11 May 1945	95th Fighter Squadron

== See also ==
- Aerospace Defense Command Fighter Squadrons
