= 96th Flying Training Squadron =

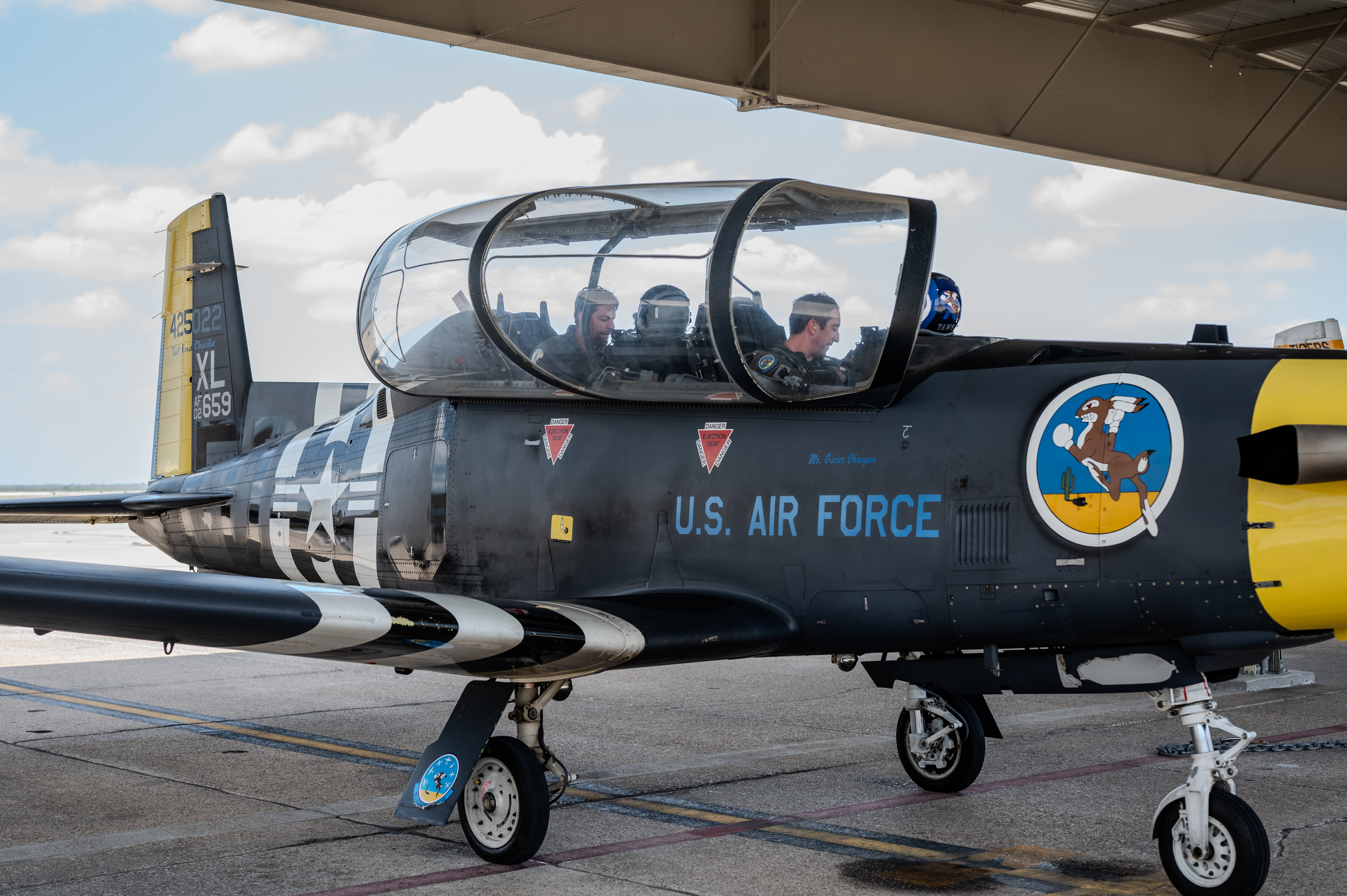
- 96th Flying Training Squadron T-6A Texan II
- Active: 1942–1945; 1947–1949; 1952–1958; 1973–1992; 1998–present
- Country: United States
- Branch: United States Air Force
- Role: Pilot Training
- Part of: Air Force Reserve Command; 10th Air Force; 340th Flying Training Group
- Garrison/HQ: Laughlin Air Force Base
- Engagements: European Theater of Operations Mediterranean Theater of Operations
- Decorations: Distinguished Unit Citation; Air Force Outstanding Unit Award

Insignia
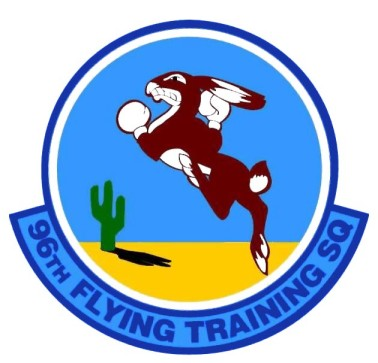
- 96th Flying Training Squadron Emblem

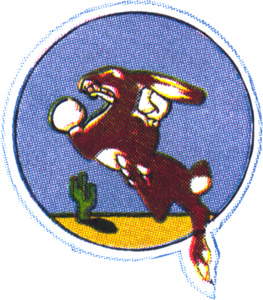
- 96th Fighter Squadron emblem (approved 18 August 1942)

The 96th Flying Training Squadron is part of the 340th Flying Training Group and is the reserve associate to the 47th Flying Training Wing based at Laughlin Air Force Base, Texas. It operates T-1 Jayhawk, T-6 Texan II, and T-38 Talon aircraft conducting flight training.

The 96th flew combat in the European Theater of Operations and the Mediterranean Theater of Operations between 25 December 1942 and 3 May 1945.

It flew fighter escort and air defense from 1947 to 1949 and air defense from 1951 to 1957.

The squadron was redesignated as the 96th Flying Training Squadron and trained USAF pilots to fly supersonic jet aircraft from 1973 to 1993. Since 1998 it has trained Air Force Reserve instructor pilots.

== History ==
=== World War II ===
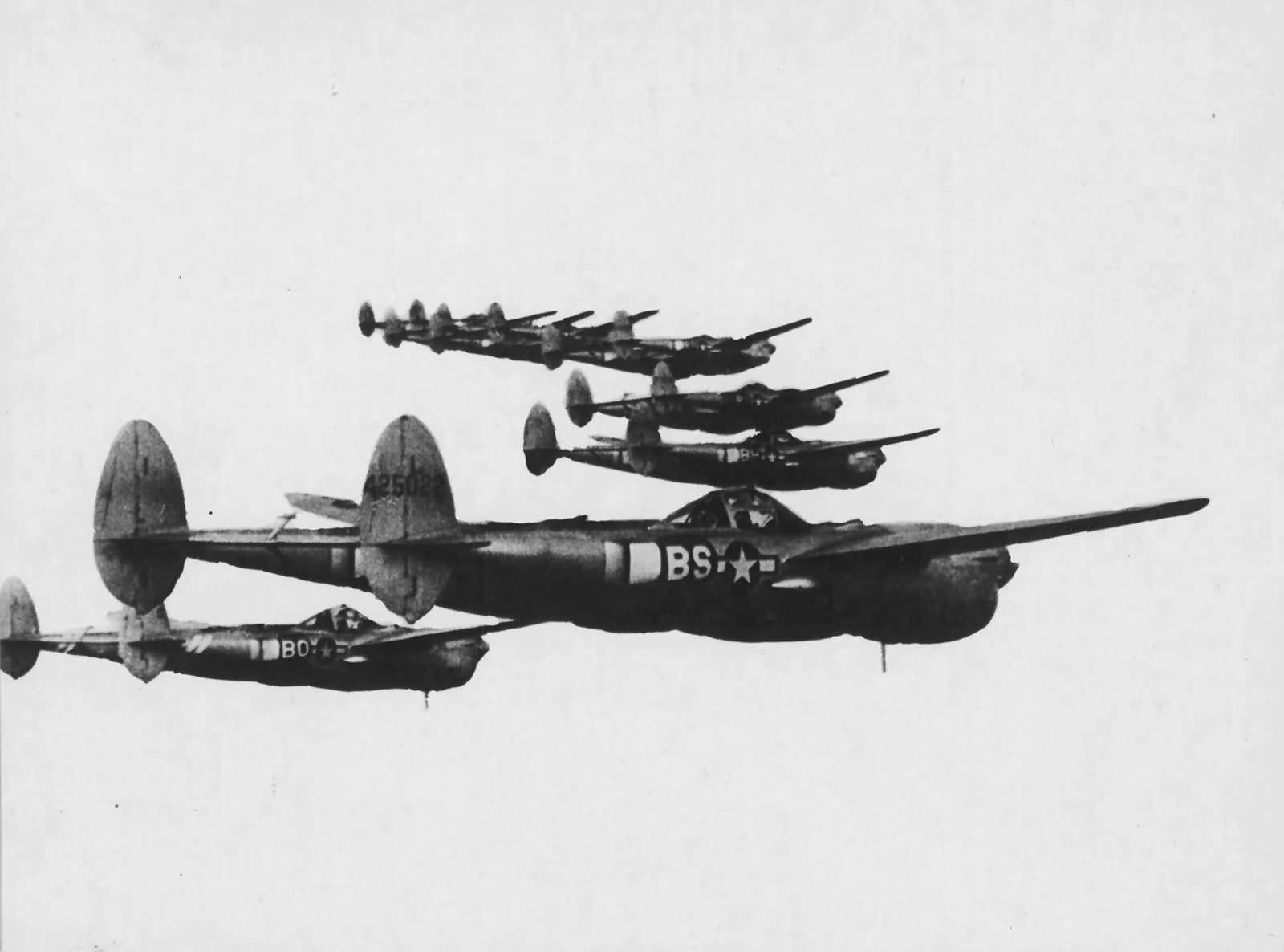
P-38 Lightnings of the 82nd Fighter Group over Italy, 1944

The squadron was first activated in early 1942 at Harding Field, Louisiana as the 96th Pursuit Squadron, one of the original three squadrons of the 82d Pursuit Group. It soon moved to California where it equipped with Lockheed P-38 Lightnings and began training with Fourth Air Force as the 96th Fighter Squadron. It left California in the fall and sailed for Northern Ireland, where it received additional combat training under Eighth Air Force. A month after the initial Operation Torch landings in North Africa the squadron deployed to Algeria, where it entered combat as an element of Twelfth Air Force.

In North Africa, the squadron flew antisubmarine patrols, bomber escort missions and attacked enemy shipping and airfields, moving its base east through Algeria and Tunisia. As the North African campaign drew to a close, the unit began attacking targets in Italy, earning a Distinguished Unit Citation for its actions on 25 April 1943 during an attack on enemy airfields in Foggia.

In September, the squadron participated in Operation Husky, the invasion of Sicily, during which it was awarded a second Distinguished Unit Citation for a bomber escort mission against marshalling yards near Naples. The squadron moved to Italy, where it became part of Fifteenth Air Force as part of the buildup to provide fighter cover for Fifteenth's heavy bombers. On 10 June 1944 the squadron earned a third Distinguished Unit Citation for its actions during an attack on oil refineries in Ploiești, Romania.

Following the surrender of Germany, the squadron remained in Italy until September 1945, when it was inactivated In the course of the war the squadron destroyed 194 enemy aircraft.

=== Cold War ===
In 1947 the squadron was again activated at Grenier Field, New Hampshire, where it was equipped with North American P-51 Mustangs as a Strategic Air Command fighter escort unit. Between April and June 1948 the squadron deployed to Ladd Air Force Base, Alaska, where it practiced rendezvousing with and escorting bombers, intercepting simulated enemy bombers and aerial gunnery. In August 1949 it was transferred to Continental Air Command and its primary role became air defense, but this mission change was brief, for the squadron was inactivated in October.

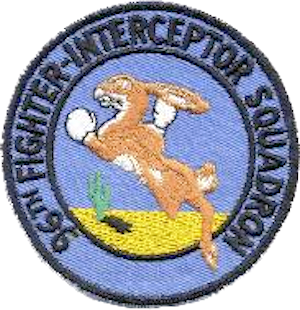
96th Fighter-Interceptor Squadron Patch

In late 1952, the squadron, now designated the 96th Fighter-Interceptor Squadron, was activated under Air Defense Command (ADC). and assigned to the 4710th Defense Wing. It was stationed at New Castle Air Force Base, Delaware, where it replaced the federalized 142d Fighter-Interceptor Squadron, which was returned to the control of the Pennsylvania Air National Guard. The 96th took over the personnel, mission, and Lockheed F-94 Starfire aircraft of the inactivating 142d.

In February 1953, another major reorganization of ADC activated Air Defense Groups at ADC bases with dispersed fighter squadrons. Air Defense Groups were assigned to defense wings and assumed direct control of the fighter squadrons at those bases, as well as support squadrons to carry out their role as the USAF host organizations at the bases. As a result of this reorganization, the 525th Air Defense Group activated at New Castle and the 96th was assigned to it. In July 1953 the squadron upgraded to a newer model of the F-94, which was armed with Mighty Mouse rockets rather than cannon.

In August 1955, ADC implemented Project Arrow, which was designed to bring back on the active list the fighter units which had compiled memorable records in the two world wars. As part of this project, the 525th Air Defense Group was replaced by the squadron's World War II headquarters, the 82d Fighter Group. The 96th was inactivated along with its parent group in early 1958 when ADC ended its operations at New Castle.

=== Pilot Training ===
In 1972 Air Training Command replaced its Major Command (MAJCON) controlled flying training units with USAF controlled units (AFCON) units. As part of this program the squadron was redesignated the 96th Flying Training Squadron and activated at Williams Air Force Base, Arizona when its parent 82d Flying Training Wing replaced the 3525th Pilot Training Wing. At Williams the unit trained USAF pilots to fly Cessna T-37 Tweet jet aircraft in the basic phase of the Undergraduate Pilot Training program. The squadron was inactivated in 1993 when Williams closed in the second round of the Base Realignment and Closure program.

In 1998, the 96th Flying Training Squadron was activated in the Air Force Reserve at Laughlin Air Force Base, Texas as an associate of the 47th Flying Training Wing. As the reserve associate unit for the wing the squadron trains Air Force Reserve pilots.

== Lineage ==
- Constituted as the 96th Pursuit Squadron (Interceptor) on 13 January 1942

Activated on 9 February 1942

- Redesignated 96th Pursuit Squadron (Interceptor) (Twin Engine) on 22 April 1942
- Redesignated 96th Fighter Squadron (Twin Engine) on 15 May 1942
- Redesignated 96th Fighter Squadron, Two Engine on 22 February 1944

Inactivated on 9 September 1945
Activated on 12 April 1947

- Redesignated 96th Fighter Squadron, Single Engine on 15 August 1947

Inactivated on 2 October 1949

- Redesignated 96th Fighter-Interceptor Squadron 11 September 1952

Activated on 1 November 1952
Inactivated on 8 January 1958

- Redesignated 96th Flying Training Squadron on 22 June 1972

Activated 1 February 1973
Inactivated 26 June 1992
Activated on 1 April 1998

=== Assignments ===
- 82d Fighter Group: 9 February 1942 – 9 September 1945
- 82d Fighter Group: 12 April 1947 – 2 October 1949
- 4710th Defense Wing: 1 November 1952
- 525th Air Defense Group: 8 February 1953
- 82d Fighter Wing: 18 August 1955 – 8 January 1958
- 82d Flying Training Wing: 1 February 1973 – 26 June 1992
- 340th Flying Training Group 1 April 1998 – Present

=== Stations ===
- Harding Field, Louisiana, 9 February 1942
- Muroc Army Air Field, California, 30 April 1942
- Glendale, California, 18 May 1942 – 16 September 1942
- RAF Eglinton, Northern Ireland, 5 October 1942
- Tafaraoui Airfield, Algeria, 24 December 1942
- Telergma Airfield, Algeria, 1 January 1943
- Berteaux Airfield, Algeria, 1 April 1943
- Souk-el-Arba Airfield, Tunisia, 13 June 1943
- Grombalia Airfield, Tunisia, 4 August 1943

(operated from Maddalina, Sicily, Italy 6–18 September 1943)

- San Pancrazio Airfield, Italy, c. 3 October 1943
- Lecce Airfield, Italy, 10 October 1943
- Vincenzo Airfield, Italy, 11 January 1944
- Lesina Airfield, Italy, c. 30 August 1945 – 9 September 1945
- Grenier Air Force Base, New Hampshire, 12 April 1947 – 2 October 1949

(deployed to Ladd Air Force Base, Alaska 4 April-29 June 1948)

- New Castle Air Force Base, Delaware, 1 November 1952 – 8 January 1958
- Williams Air Force Base, Arizona, 1 February 1973 – 1 April 1993
- Laughlin Air Force Base, Texas, 1 April 1998 – Present

=== Aircraft ===
- P-38 Lightning (1942–1945)
- F-51 Mustang (1947–1949)
- F-94B Starfire (1952–1957)
- T-37 Tweet (1973–1992, 1998–2004)
- T-38 Talon (1998 – present)
- T-1 Jayhawk (1998 – present)
- T-6 Texan II (2002 – present)

=== Awards and campaigns ===
| Award streamer | Award | Dates | Notes |
|---|---|---|---|
| | Distinguished Unit Citation | 25 April 1943 | 96th Fighter Squadron, Italy |
| | Distinguished Unit Citation | 2 September 1943 | 96th Fighter Squadron, Italy |
| | Distinguished Unit Citation | 10 June 1944 | 96th Fighter Squadron, Ploiești, Romania |
| | Air Force Outstanding Unit Award | 1 January 1978-30 April 1979 | 96th Flying Training Squadron |
| | Air Force Outstanding Unit Award | 1 May 1983-30 April 1985 | 96th Flying Training Squadron |
| | Air Force Outstanding Unit Award | 1 June 1989-31 May 1991 | 96th Flying Training Squadron |

| Campaign Streamer | Campaign | Dates | Notes |
|---|---|---|---|
| | Air Offensive, Europe | 3 October 1942 – 5 June 1944 | 96th Fighter Squadron |
| | Tunisia | 24 December 1942 – 13 May 1943 | 96th Fighter Squadron |
| | Sicily | 14 May 1943 – 17 August 1943 | 96th Fighter Squadron |
| | Naples-Foggia | 18 August 1943 – 21 January 1944 | 96th Fighter Squadron |
| | Rome-Arno | 22 January 1944 – 9 September 1944 | 96th Fighter Squadron |
| | Normandy | 6 June 1944 – 24 July 1944 | 96th Fighter Squadron |
| | Northern France | 25 July 1944 – 14 September 1944 | 96th Fighter Squadron |
| | Southern France | 15 August 1944 – 14 September 1944 | 96th Fighter Squadron |
| | North Apennines | 10 September 1944 – 4 April 1945 | 96th Fighter Squadron |
| | Rhineland | 15 September 1944 – 21 March 1945 | 96th Fighter Squadron |
| | Central Europe | 22 March 1944 – 21 May 1945 | 96th Fighter Squadron |
| | Po Valley | 3 April 1945 – 8 May 1945 | 96th Fighter Squadron |
| | Air Combat, EAME Theater | 3 October 1942 – 11 May 1945 | 96th Fighter Squadron |
