= 97th Flying Training Squadron =

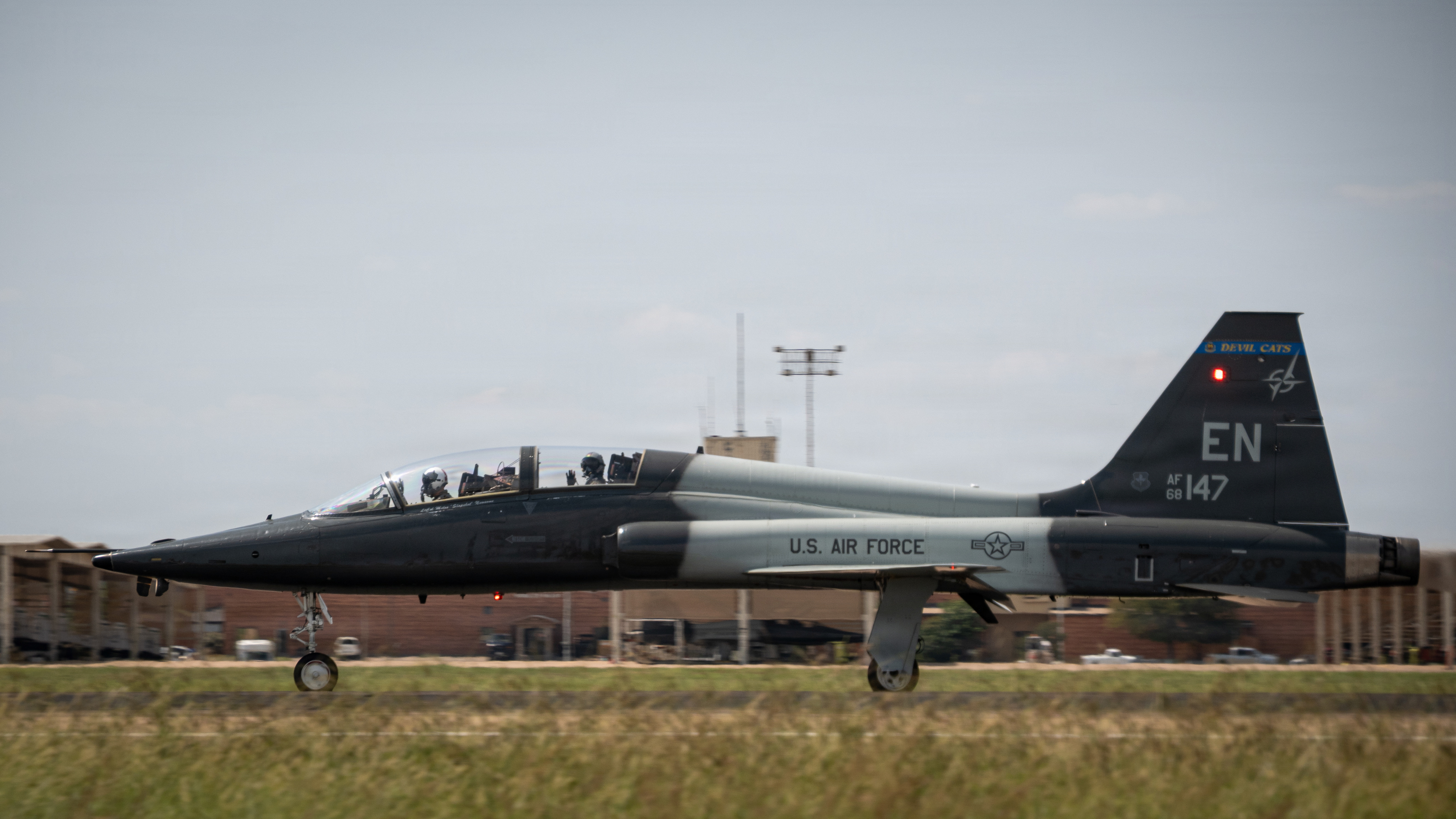
- Devil Cats T-38 Talon at Sheppard Air Force Base
- Active: 1942–1945; 1947–1949; 1950–1958; 1973–1993; 1998–present
- Country: United States
- Branch: United States Air Force
- Role: Pilot Training
- Part of: Air Force Reserve Command; 10th Air Force; 340th Flying Training Group
- Garrison/HQ: Sheppard Air Force Base
- Nickname: Devil Cats
- Engagements: European Theater of Operations Mediterranean Theater of Operations
- Decorations: Distinguished Unit Citation; Air Force Outstanding Unit Award

Insignia
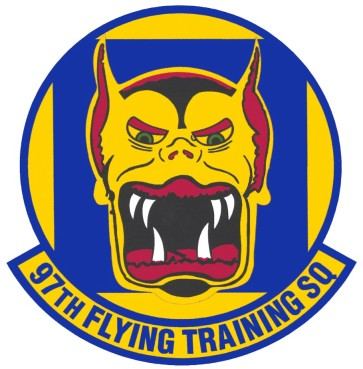
- 97th Flying Training Squadron Emblem (Note: The emblem is the stylized face of a Devil Cat, which is neither cat nor wolf and supposedly has roamed the steppes of Russia for generations. Its awesome appearance indicates the beast's true ferocity and diabolical wiliness and daring. No animal, real or imaginary, excites greater respect or fear among the peoples of the steppes than the Devil Cat. History of the 80th Flying Training Wing,)

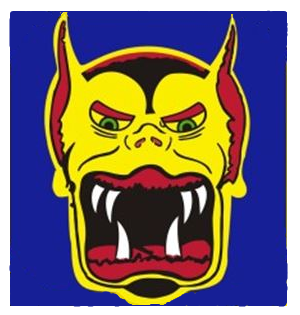
- 97th Fighter Squadron emblem (approved 30 October 1942)

The 97th Flying Training Squadron is part of the 340th Flying Training Group and is the Reserve associate to the 80th Flying Training Wing based at Sheppard Air Force Base, Texas.

The 97th flew combat in the European Theater of Operations and the Mediterranean Theater of Operations between 25 December 1942 and 3 May 1945. It flew fighter escort and air defense from, 1947–1949 and air defense from, 1951–1957.

The squadron was redesignated as the 97th Flying Training Squadron and trained USAF pilots to fly supersonic jet aircraft from 1973 to 1993. Since 1998 it has trained fighter pilots for the United States as well as America's European and NATO allies.

== Mission ==
The squadron operates Beechcraft T-6A Texan II and Northrop T-38 Talon aircraft conducting flight training for the Euro-NATO Joint Jet Pilot Training Program (ENJJPT) with highly experienced Air Force Reserve instructor pilots.

== History ==
=== World War II ===
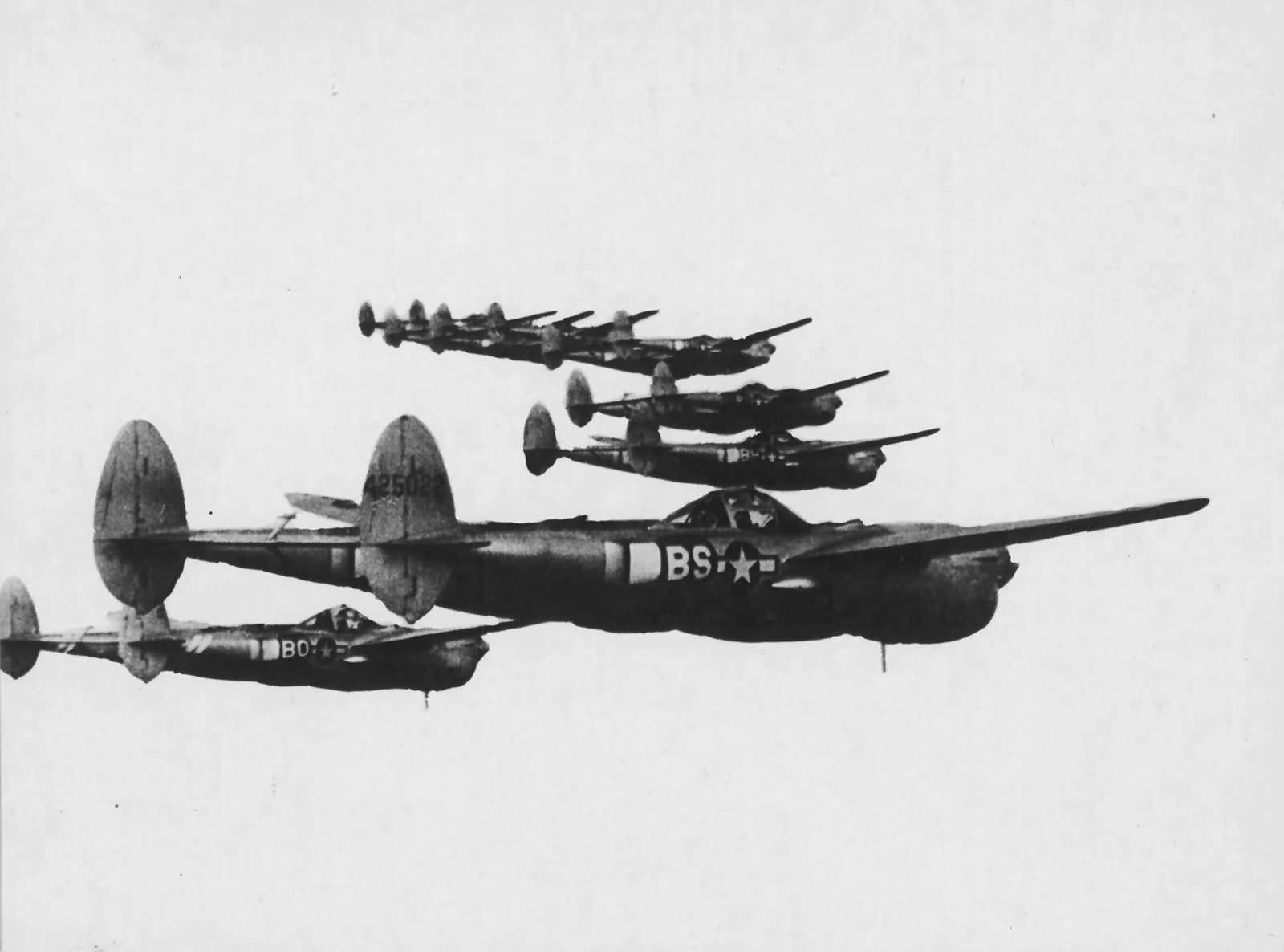
P-38 Lightnings of the 82nd Fighter Group over Italy, 1944

The squadron was first activated in early 1942 at Harding Field, Louisiana as the 97th Pursuit Squadron, one of the original three squadrons of the 82d Pursuit Group. It soon moved to California where it equipped with Lockheed P-38 Lightnings and began training with Fourth Air Force as the 97th Fighter Squadron. It left California in the fall and sailed for Northern Ireland, where it received additional combat training under Eighth Air Force. A month after the initial Operation Torch landings in North Africa the squadron deployed to Algeria, where it entered combat as an element of Twelfth Air Force.

In North Africa, the squadron flew antisubmarine patrols, bomber escort missions and attacked enemy shipping and airfields, moving its base east through Algeria and Tunisia. As the North African campaign drew to a close, the unit began attacking targets in Italy, earning a Distinguished Unit Citation for its actions on 25 April 1943 during an attack on enemy airfields in Foggia.

In September, the squadron participated in Operation Husky, the invasion of Sicily, during which it was awarded a second Distinguished Unit Citation for a bomber escort mission against marshalling yards near Naples. The squadron moved to Italy, where it became part of Fifteenth Air Force as part of the buildup to provide fighter cover for Fifteenth's heavy bombers. On 10 June 1944 the squadron earned a third Distinguished Unit Citation for its actions during an attack on oil refineries in Ploiești, Romania.

Following the surrender of Germany, the squadron remained in Italy until September 1945, when it was inactivated In the course of the war the squadron was credited with the destruction of 146 enemy aircraft.

=== Cold War ===
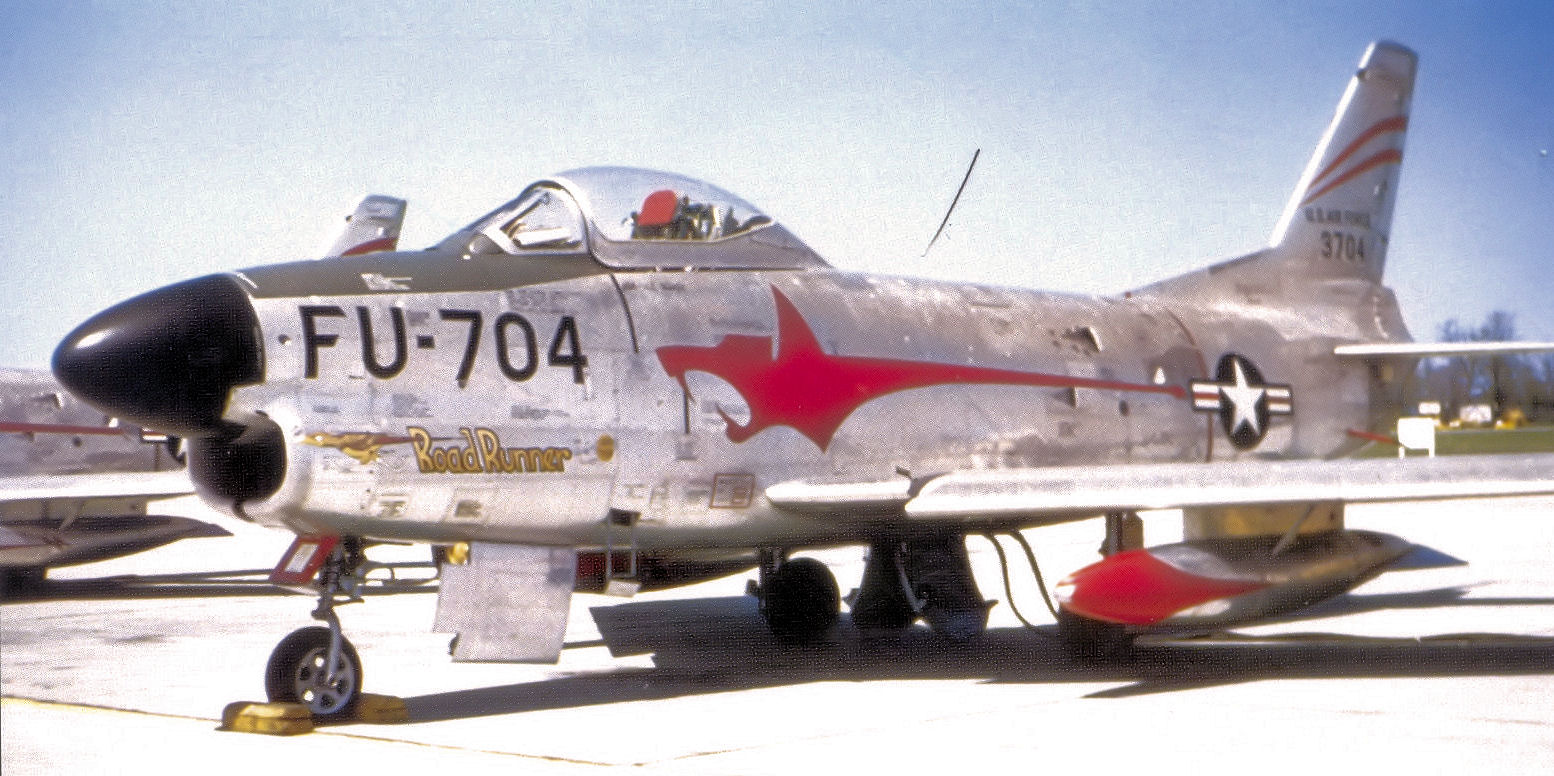
North American F-86L Sabre 53-704 at Wright-Patterson AFB 1954 (Note: This aircraft is now on static display at the Travis AFB museum in California)

In 1947 the squadron was again activated at Grenier Field, New Hampshire, where it was equipped with North American P-51 Mustangs as a Strategic Air Command fighter escort unit. Between April and June 1948 the squadron deployed to Ladd Air Force Base, Alaska, where it practiced rendezvousing with and escorting bombers, intercepting simulated enemy bombers and aerial gunnery. In August 1949 it was transferred to Continental Air Command and its primary role became air defense, but this mission change was brief, for the squadron was inactivated in October.

In late 1950, the squadron, now designated the 97th Fighter-Interceptor Squadron, was activated under Air Defense Command (ADC) at Wright-Patterson Air Force Base, Ohio and soon began to equip with North American F-86 Sabres. Although it was assigned to Eastern Air Defense Force, in the first year it was active, it was attached to both the 56th and 142d Fighter-Interceptor Wings. This was due to ADC's difficulty under the existing wing base organizational structure in deploying fighter squadrons to best advantage. As a result, in February 1952 ADC reorganized its fighter forces on a regional basis, and the squadron was reassigned to the 4706th Defense Wing.

In August 1955, ADC implemented Project Arrow, which was designed to bring back on the active list the fighter units which had compiled memorable records in the two world wars. Project Arrow was also designed to reunite fighter squadrons with their traditional headquarters. As a result, the 97th moved on paper to New Castle County Airport, Delaware, where it assumed the mission, personnel, and Mighty Mouse Rocket armed Lockheed F-94 Starfire aircraft of the 332d Fighter-Interceptor Squadron, which moved on paper to McGuire Air Force Base, New Jersey. Meanwhile, the 97th's personnel and equipment at Wright-Patterson were assigned to the 56th Fighter-Interceptor Squadron. The squadron remained at New Castle until it was inactivated in 1958.

=== Flying Training ===
In 1972 Air Training Command replaced its Major Command (MAJCOM) controlled flying training units with USAF controlled units (AFCON) units. As part of this program the squadron was redesignated the 97th Flying Training Squadron and activated at Williams Air Force Base, Arizona when its parent 82d Flying Training Wing replaced the 3525th Pilot Training Wing. At Williams the unit trained USAF pilots to fly Northrop T-38 Talon supersonic jet aircraft in the advanced phase of the Undergraduate Pilot Training program. The squadron was inactivated in 1993 when Williams closed in the second round of the Base Realignment and Closure program.

In 1998, the 97th Flying Training Squadron was activated in the Air Force Reserve at Sheppard Air Force Base, Texas as an associate of the 80th Flying Training Wing. The 80th wing conducts the European-North Atlantic Treaty Organization Joint Jet Pilot Training Program. The squadron also uses the T-38C in the Introduction to Fighter Fundamentals course (IFF), an advanced pilot course that teaches basic fighter maneuvers. As the reserve associate unit for these programs the squadron uses Air Force Reserve instructor pilots to perform student training.

== Lineage ==
- Constituted as the 97th Pursuit Squadron (Interceptor) on 13 January 1942

Activated on 9 February 1942
Redesignated 97th Pursuit Squadron (Interceptor) (Twin Engine) on 22 April 1942
Redesignated 97th Fighter Squadron (Twin Engine) on 15 May 1942
Redesignated 97th Fighter Squadron, Two Engine on 28 February 1944
Inactivated on 9 September 1945

- Activated on 12 April 1947 *

Redesignated 97th Fighter Squadron, Single Engine on 15 August 1947
Inactivated on 2 October 1949
Redesignated 97th Fighter-Interceptor Squadron on 13 November 1950

- Activated on 1 December 1950

Inactivated on 8 January 1958
Redesignated 97th Flying Training Squadron on 22 June 1972

- Activated on 1 February 1973

Inactivated on 1 April 1993

- Activated on 1 April 1998

=== Assignments ===
- 82d Pursuit Group (later 82d Fighter Group), 9 February 1942 – 9 September 1945
- 82d Fighter Group, 12 April 1947 – 2 October 1949
- Eastern Air Defense Force, 1 December 1950 (attached to 56th Fighter-Interceptor Wing until 20 May 1951, then to 142d Fighter-Interceptor Wing)
- 4706th Defense Wing (later 4706th Air Defense Wing), 6 February 1952
- 82d Fighter Group, 18 August 1955 – 8 January 1958
- 82d Flying Training Wing, 1 February 1973 –
- 82d Operations Group, 15 December 1991 – 1 April 1993
- 340th Flying Training Group, 1 April 1998 – Present

=== Stations ===
- Harding Field, Louisiana, 9 February 1942
- Muroc Army Air Field, California, 17 April 1942
- Long Beach Army Air Field, California, 22 May 1942 – 16 September 1942
- RAF Eglinton, Northern Ireland, 5 October 1942
- Tafaraoui Airfield, Algeria, 24 December 1942
- Telergma Airfield, Algeria, 1 January 1943
- Berteaux Airfield, Algeria, 28 March 1943
- Souk-el-Arba Airfield, Tunisia, 13 June 1943
- Grombalia Airfield, Tunisia, 4 August 1943

Operated from Gerbini Airfield, Sicily, 6 September 1943 – 18 September 1943)

- San Pancrazio Airfield, Italy, 3 October 1943
- Lecce Airfield, Italy, 10 October 1943
- Vincenzo Airfield, Italy 11 January 1944
- Lesina Airfield, Italy, c. 30 August 1945 – 9 September 1945
- Grenier Field (later Grenier Air Force Base), New Hampshire, 12 April 1947 – 2 October 1949

(deployed to Ladd Air Force Base, Alaska, 4 April 1948 – 29 June 1948)

- Wright-Patterson Air Force Base, Ohio, 1 December 1950
- New Castle Airport, Delaware, 18 August 1955 – 8 January 1958
- Williams Air Force Base, Arizona, 1 February 1973 – 1 April 1993
- Sheppard Air Force Base, Texas, 1 April 1998 – Present

=== Aircraft ===
- Lockheed P-38 Lightning (1942–1945)
- F-51 Mustang (1947–1949)
- F-86D Sabre (1951–1955)
- F-94C Starfire (1955–1957)
- Northrop T-38A Talon (1973–1993, 1998–2005)
- Northrop T-38C Talon (2005 – present)
- T-37 Tweet (1998–2009)
- Northrop AT-38B Talon (1998–2006)
- Beechcraft T-6 Texan II (2008 – present)

=== Awards and campaigns ===
Award streamer	Award	Dates	Notes
	Distinguished Unit Citation	25 April 1943	97th Fighter Squadron, Italy
	Distinguished Unit Citation	2 September 1943	97th Fighter Squadron, Italy
	Distinguished Unit Citation	10 June 1944	97th Fighter Squadron, Ploiești, Romania
	Air Force Outstanding Unit Award	1 January 1978-30 April 1979	97th Flying Training Squadron
	Air Force Outstanding Unit Award	1 May 1983-30 April 1985	97th Flying Training Squadron
	Air Force Outstanding Unit Award	1 June 1988-31 May 1990	97th Flying Training Squadron
	Air Force Outstanding Unit Award	1 April 1991-31 March 1993	97th Flying Training Squadron

Campaign Streamer	Campaign	Dates	Notes
	Air Offensive, Europe	3 October 1942 – 5 June 1944	97th Fighter Squadron
	Tunisia	24 December 1942 – 13 May 1943	97th Fighter Squadron
	Sicily	14 May 1943 – 17 August 1943	97th Fighter Squadron
	Naples-Foggia	18 August 1943 – 21 January 1944	97th Fighter Squadron
	Rome-Arno	22 January 1944 – 9 September 1944	97th Fighter Squadron
	Normandy	6 June 1944 – 24 July 1944	97th Fighter Squadron
	Northern France	25 July 1944 – 14 September 1944	97th Fighter Squadron
	Southern France	15 August 1944 – 14 September 1944	97th Fighter Squadron
	North Apennines	10 September 1944 – 4 April 1945	97th Fighter Squadron
	Rhineland	15 September 1944 – 21 March 1945	97th Fighter Squadron
	Central Europe	22 March 1944 – 21 May 1945	97th Fighter Squadron
	Po Valley	3 April 1945 – 8 May 1945	97th Fighter Squadron
	Air Combat, EAME Theater	3 October 1942 – 11 May 1945	97th Fighter Squadron
