= 82nd Operations Group =

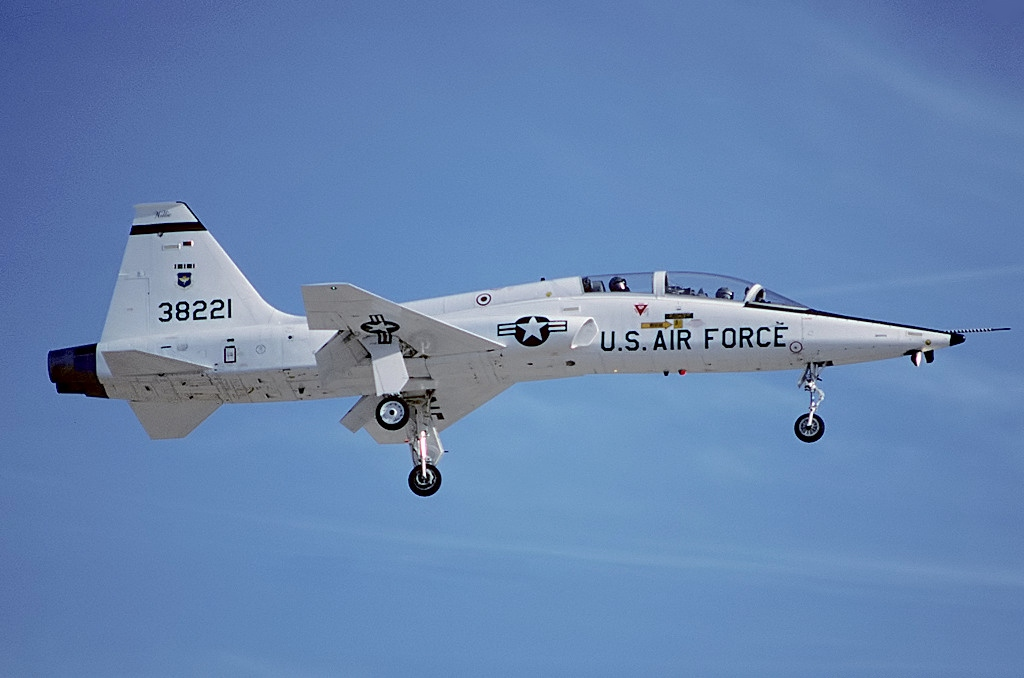
- Group T-38 Talon
- Active: 1942–1945; 1947–1949; 1955–1958; 1991–1993
- Country: United States
- Branch: United States Air Force
- Role: Flying training
- Mottos: Adorimini (Latin for 'Up and at 'em!')
- Engagements: European Theater of Operations
- Decorations: Distinguished Unit Citation

Insignia
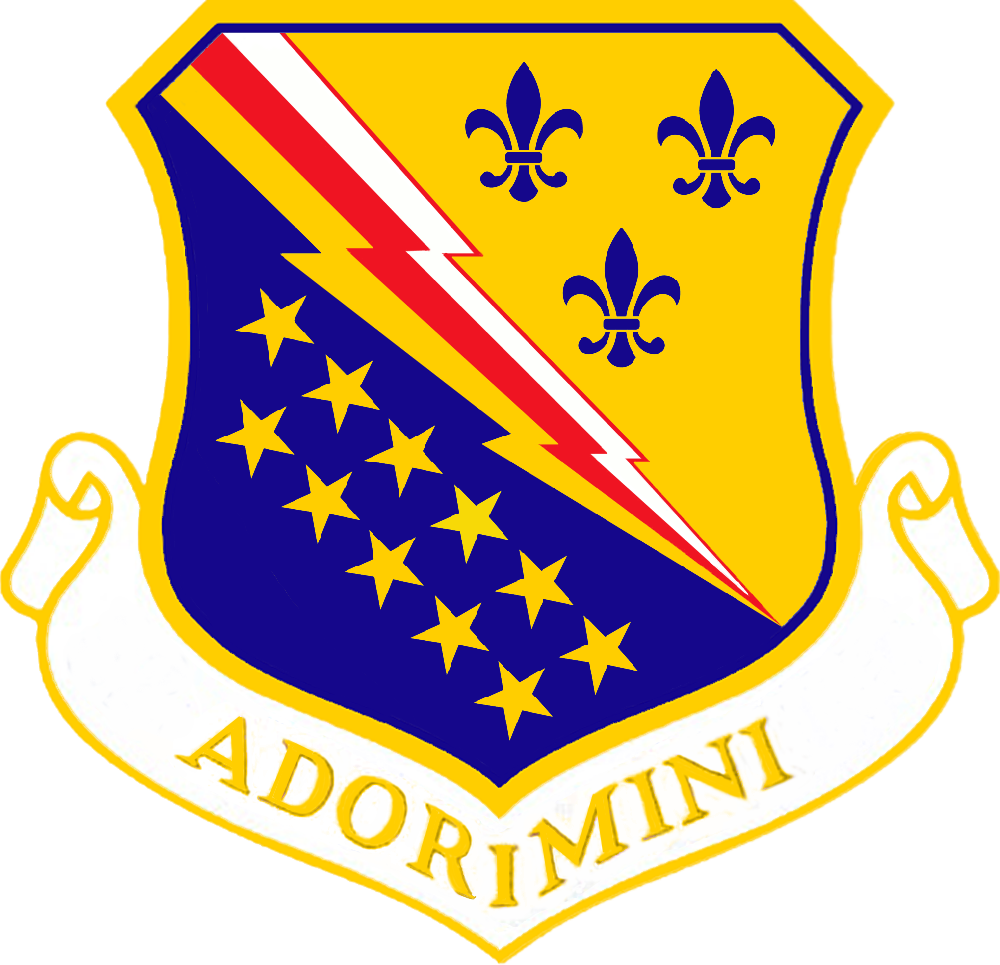
- 82nd Operations Group emblem (Note: While assigned to the 82nd Wing, the group uses the wing emblem with the group designation on the scroll. AF Instruction 84-105, Organizational Lineage, Honors and History, 27 April 2017, paragraph 3.3.3.)

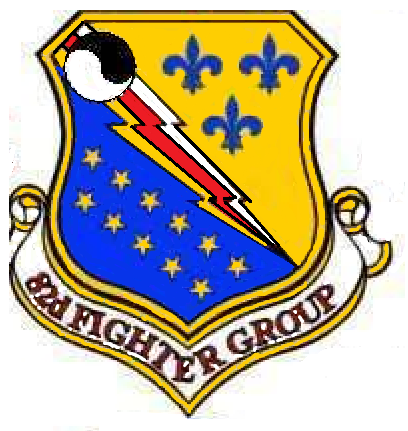
- 82nd Fighter Group emblem (Note: Approved 4 November 1957. Description: Per bend or and azure a lightning bolt in bend throughout point to base, with two beviles, per bend argent, gules and or, between three fleur-de-lis, two and one, of the second color, and eleven stars in bend, six and five of the first [color], over all in dexter chief a roundle per fess, wavy of two, sable and vert.)

The 82nd Operations Group is an inactive United States Air Force unit. It was last assigned to the 82d Flying Training Wing, stationed at Williams Air Force Base, Arizona where it was inactivated on 31 March 1993.

The group was first activated as the 82nd Pursuit Group in February 1942. After training at various bases in the United States, the group deployed as the 82nd Fighter Group to the Mediterranean Theater of Operations, where it engaged in combat operations through V-E Day, earning three Distinguished Unit Citations and being credited with the destruction of more than 500 enemy aircraft in air to air combat.

The group was again activated in 1947 as an element of Strategic Air Command. However, President Truman's 1949 defense budget called for a reduction in the number of active groups in the Air Force, and the group was inactivated. It was activated again with an air defense mission in 1955, when Air Defense Command replaced its existing defense groups with units with distinguished histories from the World Wars. It was again inactivated in 1958.

The group was redesignated as an operations group and activated as the flying element of the 82d Flying Training Wing in the Air Force's Objective Wing reorganization of 1991. However the Base Realignment and Closure Commission recommended closing its station, Williams Air Force Base, and the group was again inactivated in 1993.

== History ==
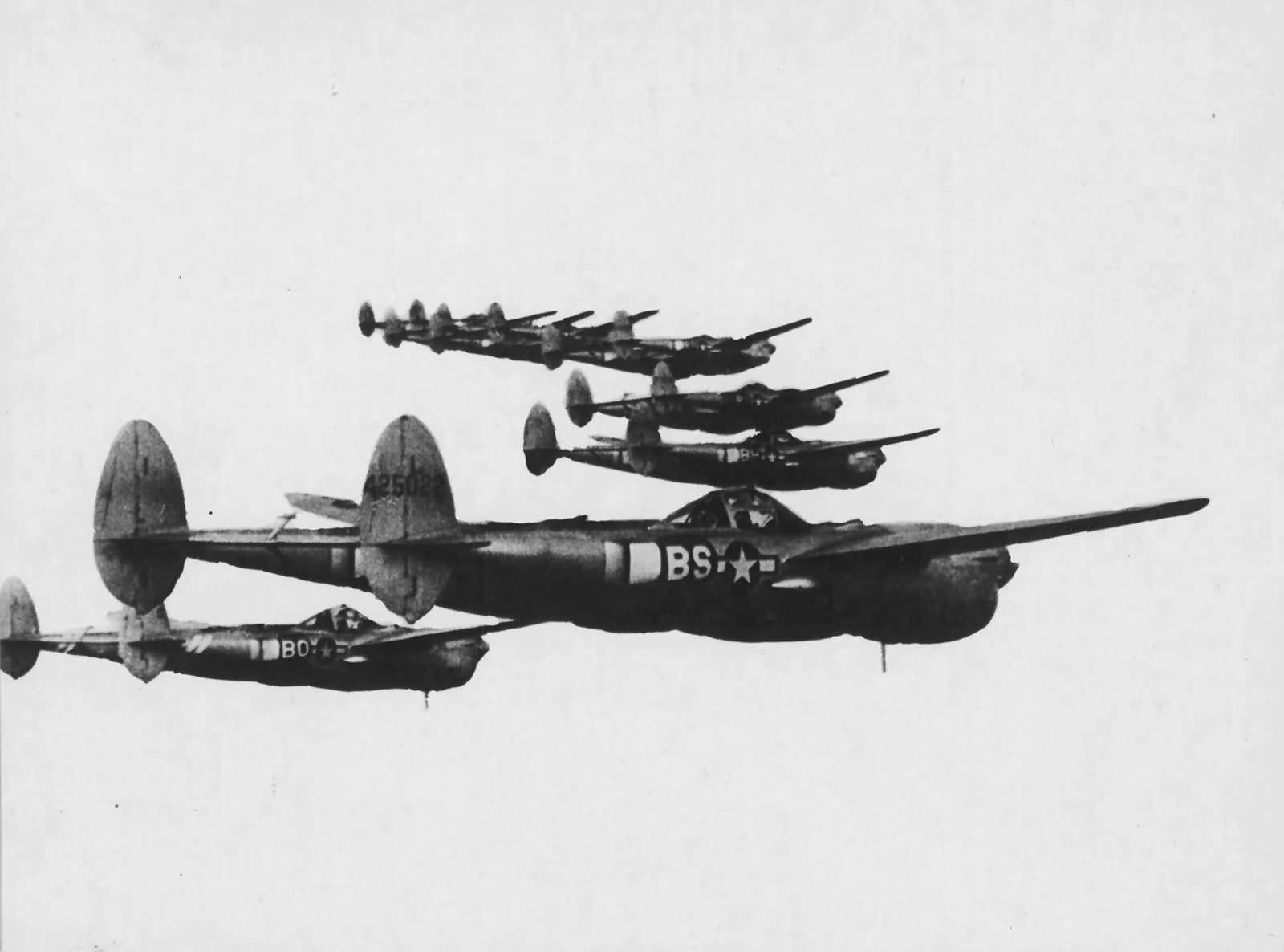
A formation of P-38 Lightnings from the group's 96th Fighter Squadron over Italy, 1944

=== World War II ===
The history of the 82nd Operations Group goes back to 13 January 1942, when the War Department constituted the 82nd Pursuit Group (Interceptor).

The 82nd was activated at Harding Field, Louisiana on 9 February 1942. From February 1942 to 9 September 1945, the primary components of the group were the 95th, 96th and 97th Pursuit Squadrons.

At the end of April 1942, when it had sufficient personnel and equipment, the 82nd moved to Muroc Army Air Field, California, and started formation flying and gunnery and bombing training with Lockheed P-38 Lightning aircraft. Half of the first class of flying sergeant enlisted pilots served with the 82nd. In May the War Department redesignated the unit as the 82nd Fighter Group (Two Engine). The group left California in September and arrived in Northern Ireland in October where it received additional training. At about the same time, the Allies launched Operation Torch, the invasion of French North Africa. By December 1942, Axis forces had repelled the Allied advance, and the long winter campaign had begun. It was at this time that the group moved to North Africa to serve with Twelfth Air Force.

Between Christmas and New Year's Day, the 82nd operated from Tafaraoui Airfield, Algeria, to protect two convoys in an anti-submarine patrol. On 1 January 1943, the air echelon moved to Telergma Airport, Algeria, where it was joined by the ground echelon in February 1943.

The 82nd soon distinguished itself in dogfights with enemy fighters while escorting bombers over Gabes, Sfax, Tunis, Bizerte, Kairouan, Sardinia, and other points. On 20 March 1943, while escorting North American B-25 Mitchells in a sea search off Cape Bon, a group of P-38s engaged the enemy in an air battle. Even though they were outnumbered by 50 enemy fighters, the 82nd emerged with 11 confirmed kills, 2 probables, and 2 damaged, while not losing a single bomber.

In April 1943, the group moved to Tunis to take part in the final phase of the Tunisian Campaign. On 11 April it destroyed 32 Junkers Ju 52s during a fighter sweep against enemy transport planes that were coming from Italy to supply the crumbling Afrika Korps. The group scored hits on 14 April during a bombing mission on a large transport off Cape Zebid and on 8 May executed a bombing attack on the airdrome at Pantelleria.

The Tunisian campaign ended in May 1943. Between December 1942 and May 1943, the 82nd Fighter Group flew 152 combat missions and 2,439 combat sorties. While escorting B-25, B-26, and B-17 bombers on 1,880 sorties, the group encountered 751 enemy aircraft, destroyed 199 of them, and lost 64 P-38s.

From July to August 1943, the 82nd engaged in the Allied invasion of Sicily while supporting bomber raids against Naples on 17 July and participating in the first raid on Rome on 19 July. It flew 191 combat missions in this period. The missions amounted to 3,335 combat sorties; escorted 2,987 B-25 and 382 B-26s; and engaged in 57 skip and dive bombing attacks. [Needs clarification.] The 82nd destroyed 78 enemy planes, had 17 probables, and damaged 56, while losing only 11 P-38s. On 25 August, it conducted a low level strafing attack against enemy aircraft concentrations at Foggia, Italy for which it received a Distinguished Unit Citation(DUC). Just over a week later, the group was awarded a second DUC for its actions in protecting a group of bombers that encountered strong enemy opposition in an attack on marshalling yards near Naples.

During the invasion of Italy by the United States Fifth Army, between 6 and 18 September 1943, the group patrolled the beachhead at Salerno where the pilots flew a round-the-clock schedule, dive-bombing enemy transports, communications, and gun positions. They also flew low altitude reconnaissance missions through the Foggia area reporting crucial enemy activities.

The movement of the 82nd to Italy and its assignment to Fifteenth Air Force was part of the airpower buildup to provide fighter protection for the bombers of the Fifteenth Air Force, when they strafed and bombed Axis oil targets. From January 1944 until May 1945, the P-38s of the 82nd Fighter Group struck oil centers at Ploiești in Romania, Blechhammer in Poland, Vienna in Austria, Dubova in Czechoslovakia, as well as in Hungary, France, and Yugoslavia. On 10 June 1944, the 82nd participated in one of the most daring strikes of the war, bombing the Romano-Americano oil refineries at Ploiești, the most heavily defended target on the continent. The group was awarded a third DUC for this mission, in which it braved head-on attacks by enemy interceptors.

The 82nd engaged in another spectacular episode when it used a single-seat fighter aircraft for the first time to rescue a downed fighter pilot on enemy soil. On 4 August 1944, while on a strafing mission against the airdrome at Focsani, Rumania, the aircraft flown by Capt E. Willsie was hit by ground fire. A veteran of 60 missions, Willsie radioed his position to the formation, crash-landed his plane, demolished it, and then hitched a ride in the lap of Second Lieutenant Richard T. Andrews, who had landed his P-38 in a pasture to rescue Willsie. On 7 Nov 1944 in the Niš incident P-38s of the 82rd Fighter Group became involved in a friendly fire incident with the 886th Aviation regiment of the Red Air Force; and had three casualties:Lt Coulson of 43-28662 Lt Brewer of 44-24035 both killed and Captain King forced to land at the Nis Airfield with a damaged plane 44-24392.

When the war in Europe ended in May 1945, the 82nd Fighter Group remained in Italy until it was inactivated on 9 September 1945.

Aerial Victories	Number
Group Hq	7
95th Fighter Squadron	199
96th Fighter Squadron	194
97th Fighter Squadron	145.98
Group Total	545.98

=== Strategic Air Command ===
On 12 April 1947, the War Department activated the 82nd Fighter Group at Grenier Field, New Hampshire and assigned it to Strategic Air Command (SAC).

The group was outfitted with North American P-51 Mustang aircraft, and it trained in long range fighter and fighter escort operations. A few months later the Air Force decided to test the wing-base (Hobson Plan) organization. Under this plan, combat wings were established. On 15 August, the 82nd Fighter Group became a subordinate component of the 82nd Fighter Wing. The test continued until 1 August 1948, by which time the Air Force had decided to adopt this type of organization as its standard. As a result, on 1 August, the 82nd Fighter Wing was discontinued, and the Air Force activated a permanent 82nd Fighter Wing, still with the 82nd Fighter Group assigned as a subordinate organization. In August 1949, the wing and its components were transferred from SAC to Continental Air Command.The group continued to operate at Grenier until its inactivation on 2 October 1949.

=== Air Defense Command ===
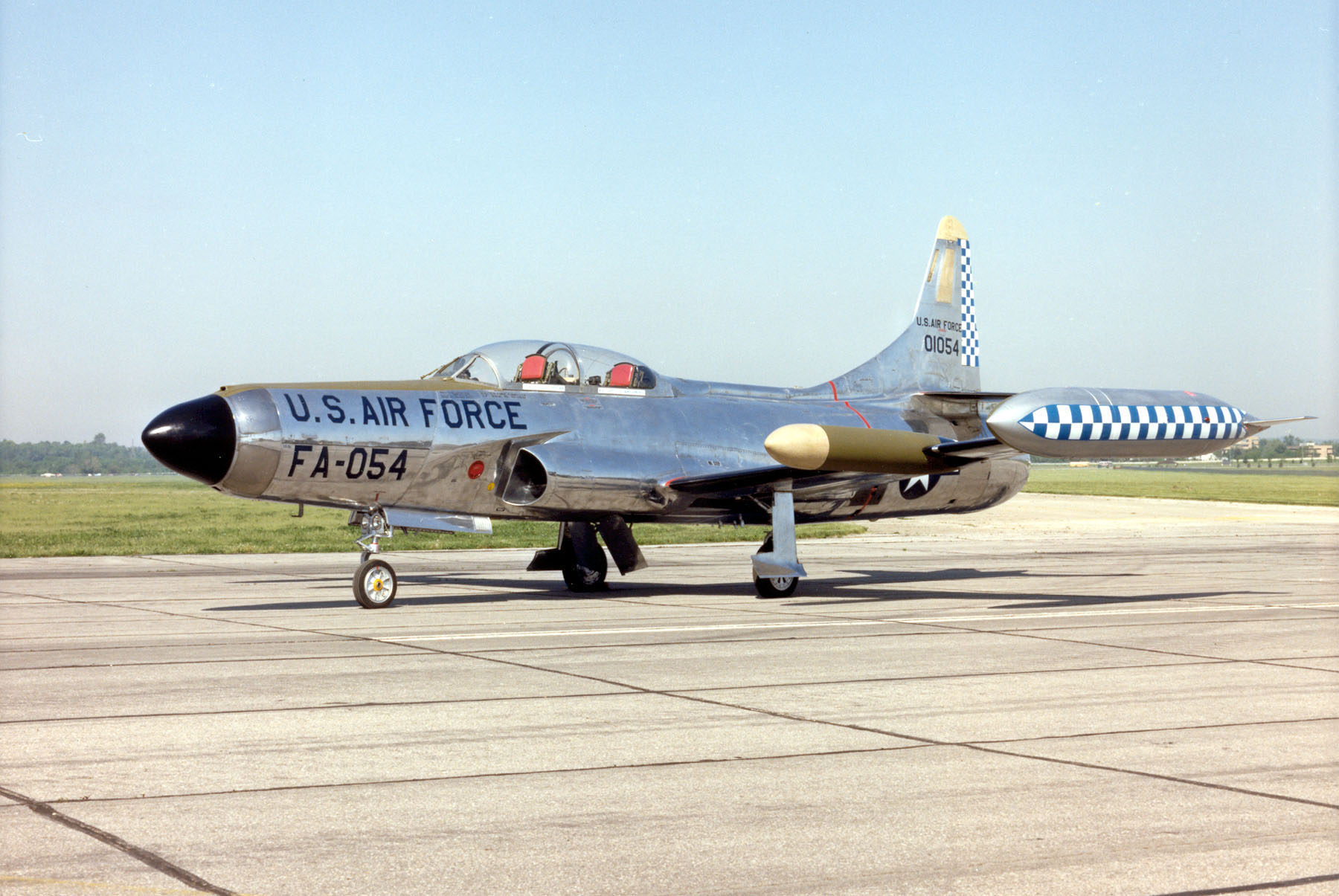
F-94 Starfire

In 1955, the Air Force redesignated the unit as the 82nd Fighter Group (Air Defense) and activated it at New Castle Air Force Base, Delaware, where it assumed the personnel and equipment of the inactivating 525th Air Defense Group as part of Air Defense Command (ADC)'s Project Arrow, which was designed to bring back on the active list the fighter units which had compiled memorable records in the two world wars. It was assigned to ADC's 4710th Air Defense Wing. Its operational squadrons were the 96th Fighter-Interceptor Squadron, which was transferred from the 525th Air Defense Group, and the 97th Fighter-Interceptor Squadron, which moved from Wright-Patterson Air Force Base, Ohio without personnel or equipment and replaced the 332nd Fighter-Interceptor Squadron, since another goal of Project Arrow was to reunited fighter squadrons with their traditional headquarters. Both Squadrons flew F-94C Starfire interceptors. Its primary mission was to provide air defense for the northeastern United States. It also acted as the host base organization for the USAF portion of New Castle Airport and was assigned several support units to fulfil this mission. In 1957, ADC reduced its forces, and the 82nd was inactivated on 8 January 1958.

=== Pilot training ===
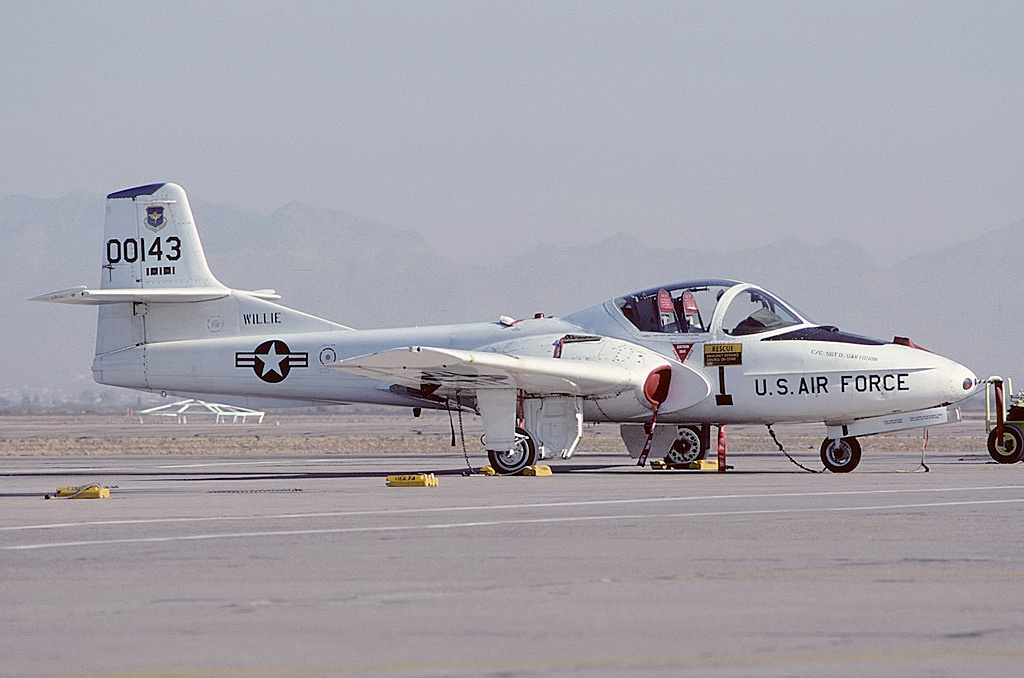
Group T-37B Tweety Bird

On 15 December 1991, the group was redesignated the 82nd Operations Group and activated at Williams Air Force Base, Arizona as a result of the 82 Flying Training Wing implementing the USAF objective wing organization. The group was assigned all the flying units of the 82nd Wing. In 1991 Congress approved the second round of base closures, as identified by the Base Realignment and Closure Commission. On that list was Williams The base was to cease operation as of 30 September 1993. As a result, the 82nd Operations Group was inactivated on 31 March 1993.

== Lineage ==
- Constituted as the 82nd Pursuit Group (Interceptor) on 13 January 1942

Activated on 9 February 1942
Redesignated as the 82nd Fighter Group (Two Engine) on 15 May 1942
Inactivated in Italy on 9 September 1945.

- Redesignated as the 82nd Fighter Group, Single Engine 1947

Activated on 12 April 1947
Inactivated on 2 October 1949
Redesignated as 82nd Fighter Group (Air Defense) on 20 June 1955
Activated on 18 August 1955
Inactivated on 30 June 1958

- Redesignated as 82nd Operations Group and activated on 15 December 1991

Inactivated on 31 March 1993

== Assignments ==
- Fourth Air Force, 9 February – September 1942
- Eighth Air Force, September – December 1942
- 7th Fighter Wing: c. November – c. 31 December 1942
- Twelfth Air Force, December 1942 – February 1943 (attached to 7th Fighter Wing: 1–17 February 1943)
- 7th Fighter Wing (later 47th Bombardment Wing): 17 February 1943 – 13 January 1944
- 5th Bombardment Wing: 13 January 1944 – 27 March 1944
- 306th Fighter Wing: 27 March 1944 – 13 June 1945
- 305th Bombardment Wing: 3 September 1945 – 9 September 1945
- 82nd Fighter Wing, 15 August 1947 – 2 October 1949
- 4710th Air Defense Wing, 18 August 1955 – 1 March 1956
- 37th Air Division, 1 March 1956 – 30 June 1958
- 82nd Flying Training Wing, 15 December 1991 – 31 March 1993

== Components ==
Operational Squadrons

- 95th Fighter Squadron, 9 February 1942 – 9 September 1945; 12 April 1947 – 2 October 1949
- 96th Fighter Squadron (later 96th Fighter-Interceptor Squadron, 96th Flying Training Squadron), 9 February 1942 – 9 September 1945; 12 April 1947 – 2 October 1949; 18 August 1955 – 8 January 1958; 15 December 1991 – 31 March 1993
- 97th Fighter Squadron (later 97th Fighter-Interceptor Squadron, 97th Flying Training Squadron), 9 February 1942 – 9 September 1945; 12 April 1947 – 2 October 1949; 18 August 1955 – 8 January 1958; 15 December 1991 – 31 March 1993
- 98th Flying Training Squadron, 15 December 1991 – 26 June 1992
- 99th Flying Training Squadron, 15 December 1991 – 31 March 1993

Support Units

- 82nd USAF Infirmary (later 82nd USAF Dispensary), 18 August 1955 – 8 January 1958
- 82nd Air Base Squadron, 18 August 1955 – 30 June 1958
- 82nd Consolidated Aircraft Maintenance Squadron, 8 August 1957 – 30 June 1958
- 82nd Materiel Squadron, 18 August 1955 – 30 June 1958
- 82nd Operations Support Squadron, 15 December 1991 – 31 March 1993

== Stations ==
- Harding Field, Louisiana 9 February 1942
- Muroc Army Air Field, California 30 April 1942
- Los Angeles Army Air Field, California May 1942
- Grand Central Air Terminal, California, c. 16 August – 16 September 1942
- Telergma Airfield, Algeria January 1943
- Berteaux Airfield, Algeria 28 March 1943
- Souk-el-Arba Airfield, Algeria 13 June 1943
- Grombalia Airfield, Tunisia 3 August 1943
- San Pancrazio Airfield, Italy c. 3 October 1943
- Lecce Airfield, Italy 10 October 1943
- Vincenzo Airfield, Italy 11 January 1944
- Foggia, Italy Summer 1944 – Summer 1945
- Lesina Airfield, Italy c. 30 August – September 1945
- Grenier Field (later Grenier Air Force Base), New Hampshire 12 April 1947 – 2 October 1949
- New Castle County Airport, Delaware, 6 February 1952 – 30 June 1958
- Williams Air Force Base, Arizona, 15 December 1991 – 31 March 1993

== Awards and campaigns ==
Award streamer	Award	Dates	Notes
	Distinguished Unit Citation	25 April 1943	82nd Fighter Group, Italy
	Distinguished Unit Citation	2 September 1943	82nd Fighter Group, Italy
	Distinguished Unit Citation	10 June 1944	82nd Fighter Group, Ploiești, Romania

82nd Fighter Group
Campaign Streamer	Campaign	Dates
	Air Offensive, Europe	3 October 1942 – 5 June 1944
	Tunisia	24 December 1942 – 13 May 1943
	Sicily	14 May 1943 – 17 August 1943
	Naples-Foggia	18 August 1943 – 21 January 1944
	Rome-Arno	22 January 1944 – 9 September 1944
	Normandy	6 June 1944 – 24 July 1944
	Northern France	25 July 1944 – 14 September 1944
	Southern France	15 August 1944 – 14 September 1944
	North Apennines	10 September 1944 – 4 April 1945
	Rhineland	15 September 1944 – 21 March 1945
	Central Europe	22 March 1944 – 21 May 1945
	Po Valley	3 April 1945 – 8 May 1945
	Air Combat, EAME Theater	3 October 1942 – 11 May 1945

== Aircraft ==
- Lockheed P-38 Lightning, (1942–1945)
- North American P-51 (later F-51) Mustang, (1947–1949)
- Lockheed F-94 Starfire, (1955–1958)
- Cessna T-37 Tweet, (1991–1992)
- Northrop T-38 Talon, (1991–1993)
