= 525th Air Defense Group =

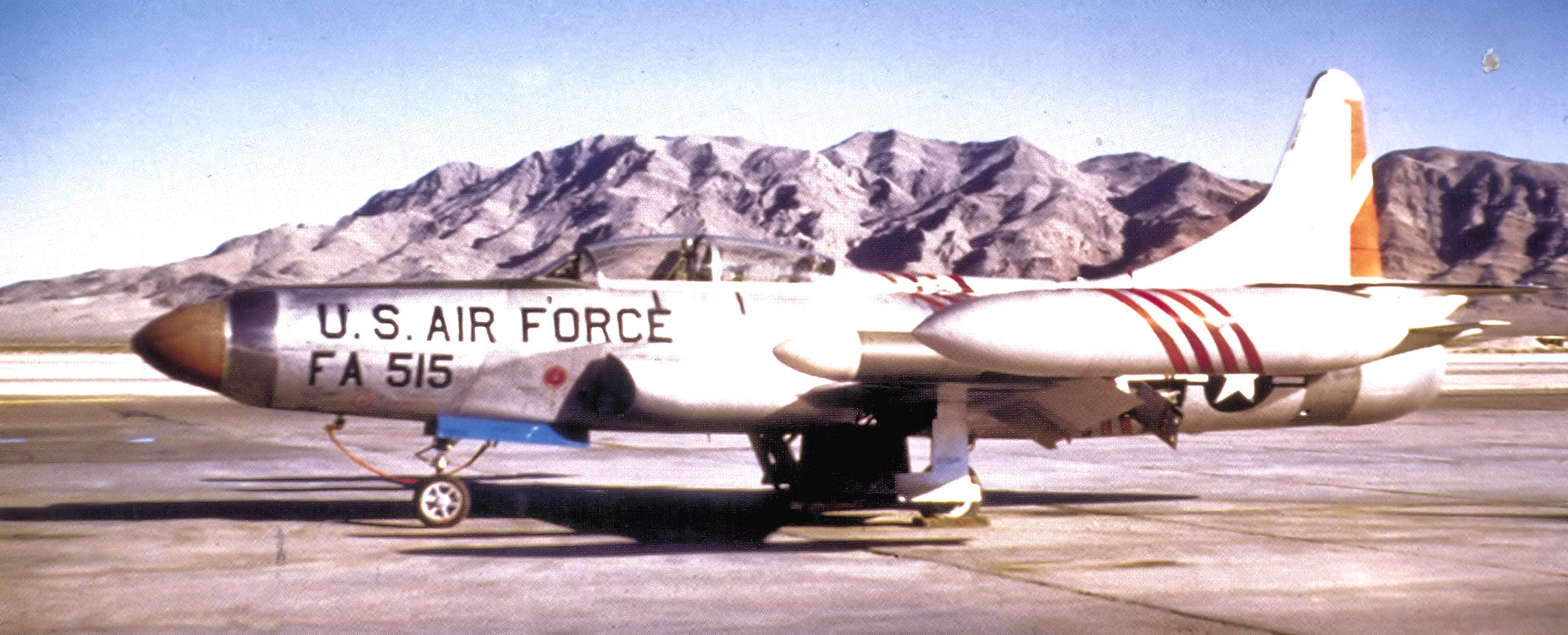
- 332d Fighter-Interceptor Squadron F-94C Starfire at Nellis AFB (Note: Aircraft is Lockheed F-94C-1-LO Starfire, serial 51-5515, This aircraft was sent to the Military Aircraft Storage and Disposal Center on 23 October 1957 and salvaged on 1 January 1958. Baugher, Joe (7 April 2023). "1951 USAF Serial Numbers". Joe Baugher.)
- Active: 1945; 1953–1955
- Country: United States
- Branch: United States Air Force
- Type: Fighter interceptor
- Role: Air defense

Insignia
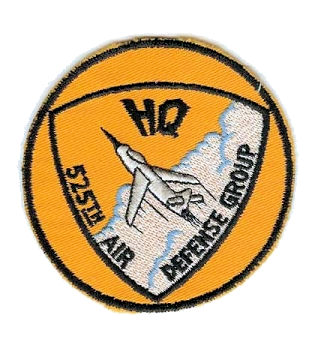
- Patch showing the 525th Air Defense Group emblem

The 525th Air Defense Group is a disbanded United States Air Force organization. Its last assignment was with the 4710th Air Defense Wing at New Castle County Airport, Delaware, where it was inactivated on 18 August 1955. The group was originally activated as the 525th Air Service Group, a support unit for a combat group at the end of World War II in Italy and then redeployed to Maine, where it supported redeploying units until it was inactivated in 1945.

The group was activated once again in 1953, when Air Defense Command (ADC) established it as the headquarters for a dispersed fighter-interceptor squadron and the medical, aircraft maintenance, and administrative squadrons supporting it. It was replaced in 1955 when ADC transferred its mission, equipment, and personnel to the 82d Fighter Group in a project that replaced air defense groups commanding fighter squadrons with fighter groups with distinguished records during World War II.

== History ==
=== World War II ===
The group was first activated in Italy as the 525th Air Service Group shortly before the end of World War II in a reorganization of Army Air Forces (AAF) support groups in which the AAF replaced service groups that included personnel from other branches of the Army and supported two combat groups with air service groups including only Air Corps units, designed to support a single combat group. Its 951st Air Engineering Squadron provided maintenance that was beyond the capability of the combat group, its 775th Air Materiel Squadron handled all supply matters, and its Headquarters & Base Services Squadron provided other support. It provided support to a combat group in Italy in 1945. The group redeployed to the United States and provided support to flying groups redeploying from Europe until it was inactivated. It was disbanded in 1948.

=== Cold War ===
The group was reconstituted, redesignated as the 525th Air Defense Group, and activated during the Cold War at New Castle County Airport in 1953 with responsibility for air defense of Mid-Atlantic region of the United States. The group was assigned the 96th Fighter-Interceptor Squadron (FIS), which was already stationed at New Castle, and flying Lockheed F-94 Starfires as its operational component. The 96th FIS had been assigned directly to the 4710th Defense Wing. The group also replaced the 82nd Air Base Squadron as USAF host organization at New Castle County Airport. It was assigned three squadrons to perform its support responsibilities.

One month after the group was activated, the 332d Fighter-Interceptor Squadron, flying later model Starfires armed with Mighty Mouse Rockets rather than cannons, was activated as the group's second operational squadron. In July 1953 the 96th FIS upgraded to the newer model "Starfires" as well. The 525th was inactivated and replaced by the 82d Fighter Group (Air Defense) as part of Air Defense Command's Project Arrow, which was designed to bring back on the active list the fighter units which had compiled memorable records in the two world wars. The group was disbanded once again in 1984.

== Lineage ==
- Constituted as 525th Air Service Group

Activated on 12 May 1945
Inactivated on 15 October 1945
Disbanded on 8 October 1948

- Reconstituted and redesignated as 525th Air Defense Group on 21 January 1953

Activated on 16 February 1953
Inactivated on 18 August 1955
Disbanded on 27 September 1984

=== Assignments ===
- Unknown, 12 May 1945 – 1945 (probably Air Service Command, Mediterranean Theater of Operations)
- Atlantic Division, Air Transport Command, 1945 – 8 October 1945
- 4710th Defense Wing (later 4710th Air Defense Wing), 16 February 1953 – 18 August 1955

=== Components ===
Operational Squadrons

- 96th Fighter-Interceptor Squadron, 16 February 1953 – 18 August 1955
- 332d Fighter-Interceptor Squadron, 27 March 1953 – 18 August 1955

Support Units

- 525th Air Base Squadron, 16 February 1953 – 18 August 1955
- 525th Materiel Squadron, 16 February 1953 – 18 August 1955
- 525th Medical Squadron (later 525th USAF Infirmary), 16 February 1953 – 18 August 1955
- 775th Air Materiel Squadron, 12 May 1945 – 15 October 1945
- 951st Air Engineering Squadron, 12 May 1945 – 15 October 1945

=== Stations ===
- Italy, 12 May 1945 – 1945
- Presque Isle Army Air Field, Maine, 1945 – 15 October 1945
- New Castle County Airport, Delaware, 16 February 1953 – 18 August 1955

=== Aircraft ===
- Lockheed F-94B Starfire, 1953
- Lockheed F-94C Starfire, 1953–1955

== See also ==
- List of United States Air Force Aerospace Defense Command Interceptor Squadrons
- F-94 Starfire units of the United States Air Force
