= 4710th Air Defense Wing =

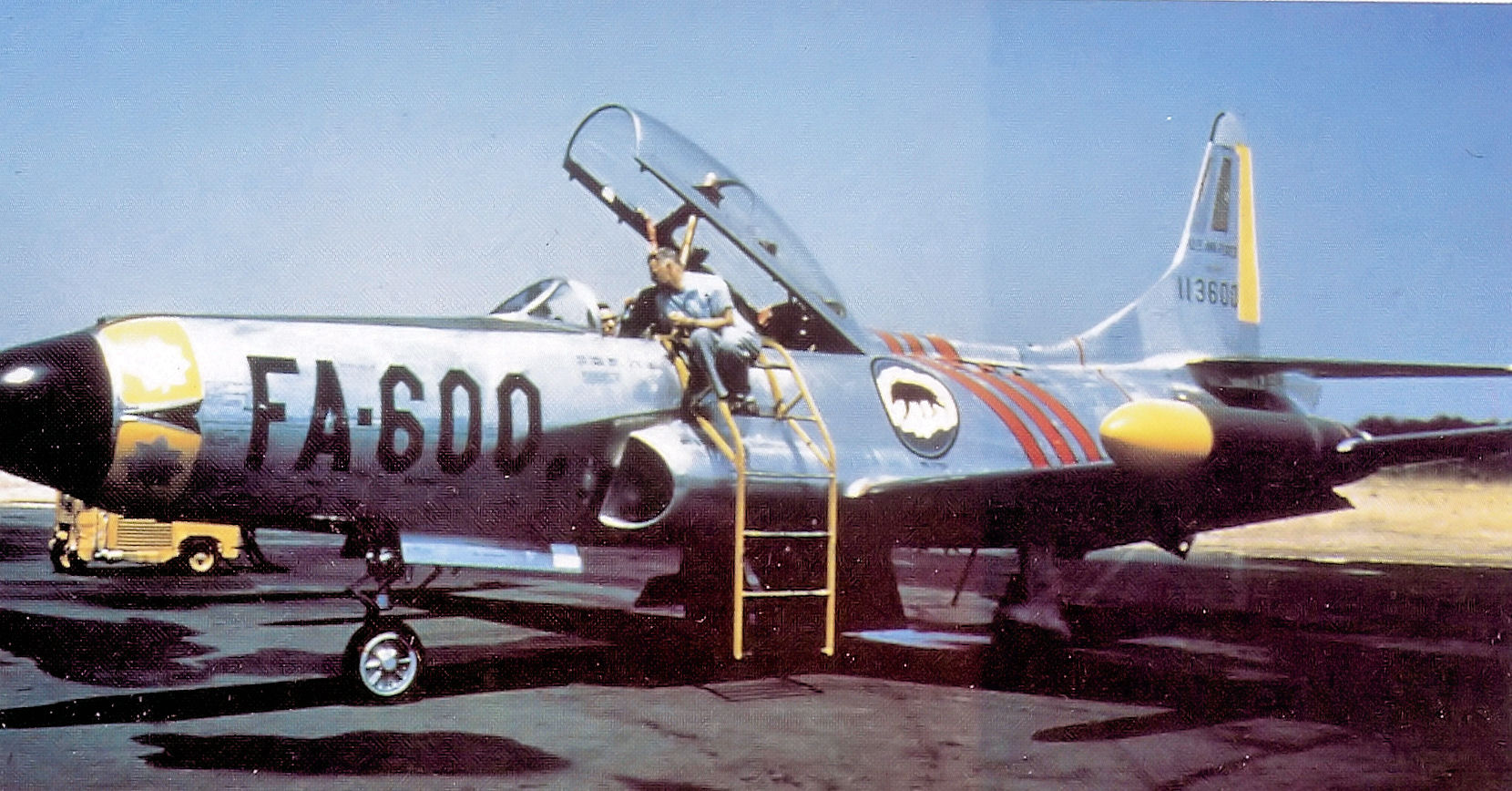
- F-94C Starfire of the wing's 46th FIS (Note: Aircraft is Lockheed F-94C-1-LO Starfire, serial 51-13600.)
- Active: 1952–1956
- Country: United States
- Branch: United States Air Force
- Type: Fighter interceptor and radar
- Role: Air defense

Commanders
- Notable commanders: Brigadier General Milton H. Ashkins (1952–1956)

The 4710th Air Defense Wing is a discontinued unit of the United States Air Force. It was last stationed at O'Hare International Airport, Illinois, where it was assigned to the 37th Air Division of Air Defense Command (ADC), and where it was discontinued in 1956. It was established in 1952 at New Castle Air Force Base, Delaware as the 4710th Defense Wing in a general reorganization of ADC, which replaced wings responsible for a base with wings responsible for a geographical area. It assumed control of several fighter interceptor squadrons that had been assigned to the 113th Fighter-Interceptor Wing, which was an Air National Guard wing mobilized for the Korean War.

In early 1953 it also was assigned five radar squadrons in Virginia, Pennsylvania, and New Jersey and its fighter squadron at New Castle combined with the colocated air base squadron into an air defense group. The wing was redesignated as the 4710th Air Defense Wing in 1954. In the spring of 1956, its subordinate units were reassigned and it moved to O'Hare as ADC prepared for the implementation of the Semi-Automatic Ground Environment air defense system.

== History ==
The wing was organized as the 4710th Defense Wing at the beginning of February 1952 at New Castle Air Force Base, Delaware and assigned to Eastern Air Defense Force as part of a major reorganization of Air Defense Command (ADC) responding to ADC's difficulty under the existing wing base organizational structure in deploying fighter squadrons to best advantage. It assumed operational control and the air defense mission of fighter squadrons formerly assigned to the inactivating Air National Guard 113th Fighter-Interceptor Wing. The 142d Fighter-Interceptor Squadron was located at New Castle with the wing headquarters, the 148th Fighter-Interceptor Squadron was a few miles away at Dover Air Force Base, Delaware, and the 121st Fighter-Interceptor Squadron was stationed at Andrews Air Force Base, Maryland. All three squadrons flew radar equipped Lockheed F-94 Starfire interceptor aircraft.

The 113th Wing had been called to active duty and moved to New Castle to replace elements of the 4th Fighter-Interceptor Wing which had deployed to Far East Air Forces because of the Korean War. The wing's mission was to train and maintain tactical flying units in state of readiness in order to defend Northeast United States. The wing's 82nd Air Base Squadron assumed base support duties at New Castle from inactivating elements of the 113th Wing. In November 1952, the 121st, 142nd, and 148th Squadrons were returned to the control of the Air National Guard and replaced by the 46th Fighter-Interceptor Squadron at Dover, the 95th Fighter-Interceptor Squadron at Andrews, and the 96th Fighter-Interceptor Squadron at New Castle.

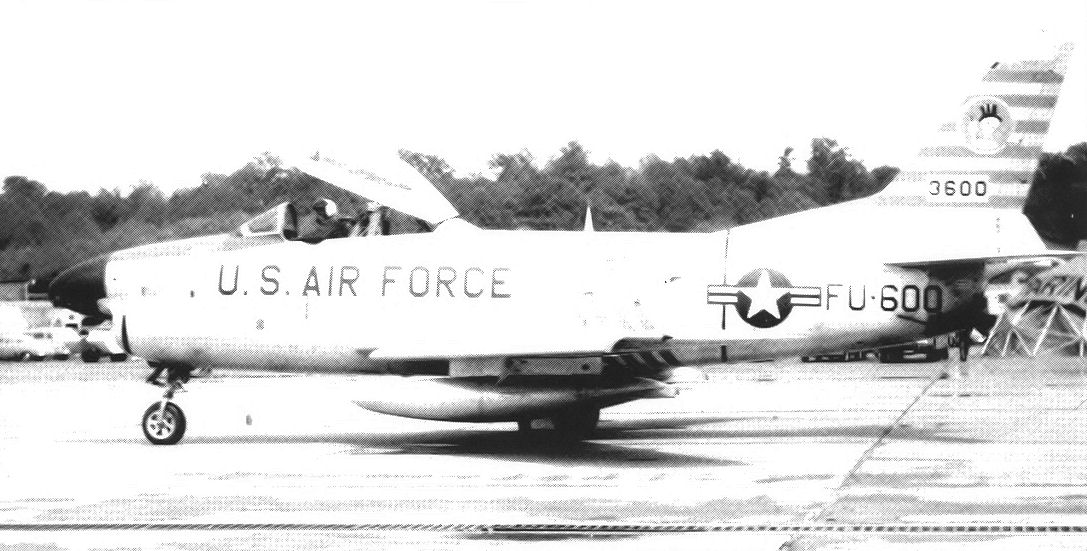
95th Fighter-Interceptor Squadron F-86D Sabre (Note: Aircraft is North American F-86D-55-NA Sabre, serial 53-600 at Andrews AFB in 1955.)

At the beginning of 1953, the 48th Fighter-Interceptor Squadron, which was converting from World War II era Republic F-47 Thunderbolts to Republic F-84 Thunderjet aircraft, moved from Grenier Air Force Base, New Hampshire to Langley Air Force Base, Virginia and was assigned to the wing. In February 1953, another major reorganization of ADC activated air defense groups at ADC bases with dispersed fighter squadrons. air defense groups were assigned to defense wings and assumed direct control of the fighter squadrons at those bases, as well as support squadrons to carry out their role as the USAF host organizations at the bases. As a result of this reorganization, the 525th Air Defense Group activated at New Castle. The reorganization also resulted in the wing adding the radar detection, control and warning mission, and it was assigned four aircraft control & warning squadrons to perform this mission, although one was reassigned a few months later. In the same reorganization, the wing was reassigned to the 26th Air Division. Fighter squadrons of the wing converted to newer aircraft during the year, the 48th joined the other squadrons of the wing in flying Starfires, although the 95th abandoned its Starfires for North American F-86 Sabres.

In 1955, ADC implemented Project Arrow, which was designed to bring back on the active list the fighter units which had compiled memorable records in the two world wars. As a result of this project, the 82nd Fighter Group (Air Defense) replaced the 525th Group at New Castle, but because of impending changes in air defense system boundaries, it was soon assigned directly to the 26th Air Division.

In March 1956, the wing's components were reassigned to the 26th and 85th Air Divisions and the reduced strength wing moved to Illinois as ADC prepared for the implementation of the Semi-Automatic Ground Environmentair defense system. It was discontinued there in July.

== Lineage ==
- Designated as the 4710th Defense Wing and organized on 1 February 1952

Redesignated as 4710th Air Defense Wing on 1 July 1954
Discontinued on 8 July 1956

=== Assignments ===
- Eastern Air Defense Force, 1 February 1952
- 26th Air Division, 16 February 1953
- 37th Air Division, 1 March 1956 – 8 July 1956

=== Components ===
==== Groups ====
- 82nd Fighter Group (Air Defense), 18 August 1955 – 1 March 1956
- 525th Air Defense Group, 16 February 1953 – 18 August 1955

==== Squadrons ====
Fighter Squadrons

- 46th Fighter-Interceptor Squadron, 1 November 1952 – 1 March 1956

Dover Air Force Base, Delaware

- 48th Fighter-Interceptor Squadron, 14 January 1953 – 1 March 1956

Langley Air Force Base, Virginia

- 95th Fighter-Interceptor Squadron, 1 November 1952 – 1 March 1956

Andrews Air Force Base, Maryland

- 96th Fighter-Interceptor Squadron, 1 November 1952 – 16 February 1953
- 121st Fighter-Interceptor Squadron, 6 February 1952 – 1 November 1952

Andrews Air Force Base, Maryland

- 142d Fighter-Interceptor Squadron, 6 February 1952 – 1 November 1952
- 148th Fighter-Interceptor Squadron, 6 February 1952 – 1 November 1952

Dover Air Force Base, Delaware

Support Squadron

- 82nd Air Base Squadron, 1 February 1952 – 16 February 1953

Radar Squadrons

- 647th Aircraft Control and Warning Squadron, 16 February 1953 – 1 March 1956

Manassas Air Force Station, Virginia

- 648th Aircraft Control and Warning Squadron, 16 February 1953 – 30 June 1953

Ricketts Glen State Park, Pennsylvania

- 770th Aircraft Control and Warning Squadron, 16 February 1953 – 1 March 1956

Palermo Air Force Station, New Jersey

- 771st Aircraft Control and Warning Squadron, 16 February 1953 – 1 March 1956

Cape Charles Air Force Station, Virginia

- 772d Aircraft Control and Warning Group, 16 February 1953 – 1 March 1956

Claysburg Air Force Station, Virginia

=== Stations ===
- New Castle Air Force Base (originally New Castle Airport), Delaware, 6 February 1952
- O'Hare International Airport, Illinois, 1 March 1956 – 8 July 1956

=== Aircraft ===
- F-47D, 1953
- F-84G, 1953
- F-86D, 1953–1956
- F-94B, 1952–1953
- F-94C, 1953–1956

=== Commanders ===
- Col. G. B. Greene, Jr., 6 February 1952 – 14 July 1952
- Col. Milton H. Ashkins, 14 July 1952 – 1956

== See also ==
- List of MAJCOM wings of the United States Air Force
- List of United States Air Force Aerospace Defense Command Interceptor Squadrons
- List of United States Air Force aircraft control and warning squadrons
