= 367th Training Support Squadron =

367th Training Support Squadron

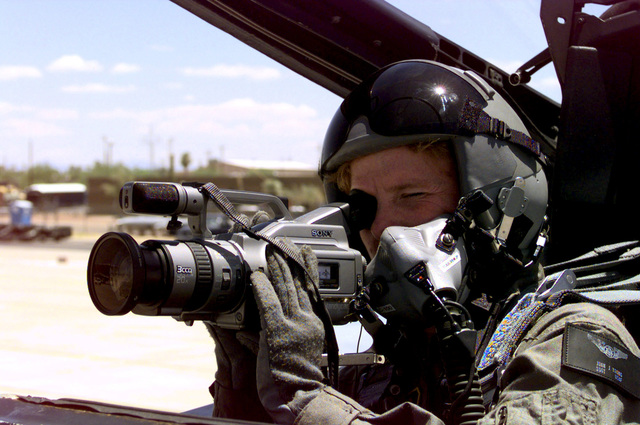
- A squadron aerial videographer checks her equipment before a mission
- Active: 1997—present
- Country: United States
- Branch: United States Air Force
- Role: Training support
- Part of: Air Education and Training Command
- Garrison/HQ: Hill Air Force Base, Utah
- Mottos: Paratus Pro Futurus (Latin for 'Prepared for the Future'), Make Training Great Again (unofficial)
- Decorations: Air Force Outstanding Unit Award

Insignia
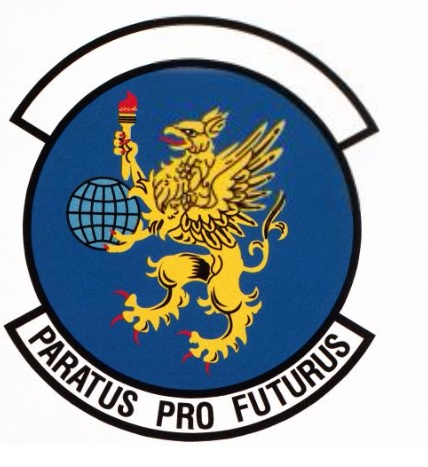
- 367th Training Support Squadron emblem (Note: Approved 1 October 1997.)

The United States Air Force 367th Training Support Squadron, located at Hill Air Force Base, Utah, is a component of the 982nd Training Group; part of the 82nd Training Wing at Sheppard Air Force Base, Texas.

== Mission ==
The 367 Training Support Squadron produces interactive multimedia instruction for aircraft and munitions maintenance training for Air Combat Command and Air Mobility Command. It produces visual information products for senior United States Air Force and Department of Defense senior leaders decision-making. It trains and deploys combat camera forces to document worldwide military operations, exercises, contingencies, and humanitarian relief operations.

== History ==
In January 1997, the Air Education and Training Command Training Support Squadron at Hill Air Force Base, Utah transferred its flying related support functions to the Air Education and Training Command Air Operations Squadron at Randolph Air Force Base, Texas. Three months later, on 1 April, it moved to Randolph, where it assumed the assets of the 619th Training Support Squadron. The 367th Training Support Squadron was activated at Hill, where it assumed the remaining mission, personnel, and equipment of the AETC Training Support Squadron.

The 367th supports Air Combat Command and the Air Mobility Command by providing fact-based performance analysis, identifying root causes of performance deficiencies, and recommending possible solutions.

Members of the squadron's analysis section travel to maintenance units across the Air Force to analyze performance deficiencies and identify training gaps. Once initial analysis is complete, design members interpret the collected data and apply ISD principles to create the framework. This framework is then passed along to the software development and graphics sections to create the designed framework. Finally, the near-finished products are scrutinized for technical accuracy, safety compliance, and overall quality by the evaluation section. Then the product is provided to a focus-group from the target audience for feedback. Once stamped with a seal of approval, products are hosted on the internally-developed and maintained Griffin website for field level use.

== Lineage ==
- Constituted as the 367th Training Support Squadron on 31 March 1997

Activated on 1 April 1997

=== Assignments ===
- 782nd Training Group, 1 April 1997
- 982nd Training Group, 1 October 2018 – present

=== Stations ===
- Hill Air Force Base, Utah, 1 April 1997 – present
