= 82nd Training Wing =

82d Training Wing (Military)
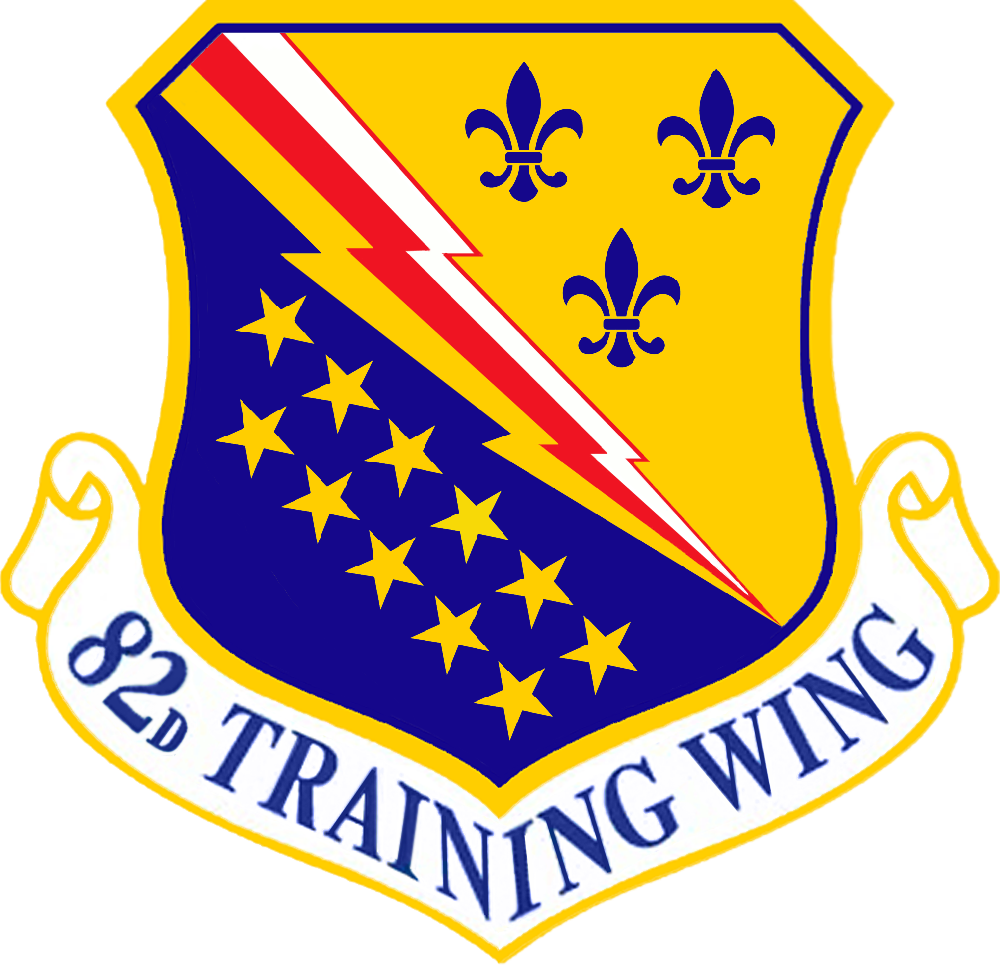
- Active: 1947–1949; 1972–1993; 1993–present
- Country: United States
- Branch: United States Air Force
- Role: Training
- Part of: Air Education and Training Command
- Garrison/HQ: Sheppard Air Force Base
- Mottos: Adorimini (Latin for 'Up and At 'Em')
- Decorations: Air Force Outstanding Unit Award

Commanders
- Current Commander: Col. Samuel R. Mink
- Vice Commander: Colonel Joseph E. Wierenga
- Command Chief Master Sergeant: Chief Master Sgt. Jalil J. Samavarchian

The 82nd Training Wing is a wing of the United States Air Force. It's assigned to the Air Education and Training Command (AETC) Second Air Force. It's stationed at the Sheppard Air Force Base, near Wichita Falls, Texas, and serves as the host unit for the base.

The 82nd Training Wing provides technical training to more than 60,000 airmen, soldiers, sailors, marines, and international students annually. It delivers more than 1,000 courses across more than 60 Air Force specialties, including aircraft maintenance, civil engineering, nuclear weapons, conventional munitions, aerospace ground equipment, telecommunications, and other advanced logistics and support skills.

The Wing hosts the Euro-NATO Joint Jet Pilot Training Program (ENJJPT), a multi-nationally staffed flying training initiative that prepares combat pilots from NATO member nations.

As of 2025, the commander of the 82nd Training Wing is Brigadier General George T.M. Dietrich III. The Command Chief Master Sergeant is Chief Master Sergeant John P. Chilcote.

== Units ==
The 82nd Training Wing is one of the four technical training wings under Air Education and Training Command.

- The 82nd Training Group and the 782nd Training Group offer courses at Sheppard Air Force Base and at several geographically separated units within the United States.
- The 982nd Training Group oversees training detachments and operating locations around the world.

82nd Training Group (82 TRG)
- The 82nd Training Group is responsible for aircraft maintenance and armament and munitions including nuclear munitions. The 82nd Training Group provides aircraft maintenance and munitions training for United States Air Force specialties, including officer and enlisted initial skills courses in 17 different Air Force Specialty Codes, advanced and supplemental courses, the Maintenance Course for Operational Commanders, and the Mission Generation Road Course.
  - 359th Training Squadron (359 TRS)
  - 361st Training Squadron (361 TRS)
  - 362nd Training Squadron (362 TRS)
  - 363rd Training Squadron (363 TRS)

782nd Training Group (782 TRG)

- The 782nd Training Group is the most diverse group in Air Education and Training Command, with courses in seven distinctly different career fields in four training squadrons. The 782nd Training Group is also responsible for training to include aircraft systems and telecommunications, avionics test equipment, combat avionics, flight line training and explosive ordnance disposal. They are also responsible for electrical, fuels and mechanical training. Detachments 1, 3, and 6 are responsible for media production and interactive courseware.
  - 364th Training Squadron
  - 365th Training Squadron
  - 366th Training Squadron
  - 367th Training Support Squadron (Hill AFB, UT)
  - 368th Training Squadron (Fort Leonard Wood, MO)

982nd Training Group (982 TRG)

- The 982d Training Group provides aircraft, munitions and communications-electronics maintenance training. The 982nd Training Group has more than 1,200 people assigned within two training squadrons and one maintenance squadron. The 982nd Training Group provides weapon systems training at 44 detachments and operating locations worldwide. Exercising single-point training management, the group is the Air Education and Training Command's first point of contact for many weapons systems. In this capacity, the 982nd develops comprehensive training programs and provides technical support for design and development of training equipment during acquisition and modification of aircraft and associated equipment.
  - 372nd Training Squadron (372 TRS)
  - 373rd Training Squadron (373 TRS)
  - 982nd Maintenance Squadron (982 MXS)
82nd Mission Support Group (82 MSG)
- The 82nd Mission Support Group provides security, personnel support, food services, communications, contracting services, logistics, supplies, vehicle maintenance, housing, lodging, facility maintenance and emergency services for Sheppard's two wings and 17 tenants composed of more than 5,900 military, civilian and contractor personnel, 81,900 joint trainees annually and 9,200 dependents and retirees.
  - 82d Communications Squadron (82 CS)
  - 82d Security Forces Squadron (82 SFS)
  - 82d Force Support Squadron (82 FSS)
  - 82d Civil Engineer Squadron (82 CES)
  - 82d Logistics Readiness Squadron (82 LRS)
  - 82d Contracting Squadron (82 CONS)

Additionally, the 82nd Comptroller Squadron (82 CPTS) reports directly to the 82 TRW.

=== Air Training Command ===
First ten women officers

The 82nd Fighter Wing was originally active at Grenier AFB, New Hampshire, between 1947 and 1949.

The 82nd replaced and absorbed resources of the 3525th Pilot Training Wing in February 1973 at Williams Air Force Base, Arizona and assumed undergraduate pilot training operations in the Cessna T-37 Tweet and the Northrop T-38 Talon aircraft. Assigned to the wing were the 96th and 97th Flying Training Squadrons.

On 19 September 1976, the first women entered undergraduate pilot training. Ten female students were in Class 77–08. First Lieutenant Christine E. Schott became the first woman to solo in the T-38. On 2 September 1977, Class 77-08 graduated, and these ten women received their wings along with 36 male classmates. In March 1978, the 82nd's first female instructor pilot, Captain Connie Engel, was assigned to the 97th Fighter Training Squadron to instruct T-38 students.

Air Training Command activated the 98th and the 99th Flying Training Squadrons on 1 June 1988 to test a four-squadron organization. The test showed the wing needed a fifth squadron to provide operational support. On 1 September 1989, ATC activated the 100th Flying Training Squadron.

In 1991 Congress approved the second round of base closures, as identified by the Base Realignment and Closure Commission. On that list was Williams. The base was to cease operation as of 30 September 1993. With Williams scheduled to close, ATC decided to move part of that base's T-38 fleet to Sheppard Air Force Base during 1992.

HQ USAF redesignated the 82nd Flying Training Wing as the 82nd Training Wing and assigned the designation to Air Education and Training Command on 1 July 1993. The 82nd was inactivated at Williams, and HQ AETC activated the 82nd Training Wing at Sheppard and assigned it to the Second Air Force. The 82nd's new mission was to conduct ground technical training. The 82nd also became the host unit at Sheppard.

The 782nd Training Group was activated on 23 March 1994 and assigned it to the 82nd Training Wing. At the same time, the 396th Technical Training Group changed its name to the 82nd Training Group, the 82nd Medical Group became the 882nd Training Group, and the 82nd Field Training Group became the 982nd Training Group. On 30 March, the wing began providing technician training, first in the C-141 crew chief course and, a day later, in the F-16 crew chief course. The C-141 program graduated its first class in August, followed in September by the F-16 class.

== Lineage ==
- Established as the 82nd Fighter Wing on 28 July 1947

Organized on 15 August 1947
Inactivated on 2 October 1949

- Redesignated 82nd Flying Training Wing on 22 June 1972 (Note: Despite the similarity in names, the wing is not related to the 82d Flying Training Wing (Flexible Gunnery) that was constituted in 1943, activated on 25 August 1943 at Las Vegas Army Airfield, Nevada and assigned to Western Flying Training Command and disbanded on 16 June 1946.)

Activated on 1 February 1973
Inactivated on 31 March 1993

- Redesignated 82nd Training Wing and activated on 1 July 1993

=== Assignments ===
- Strategic Air Command, 15 August 1947 (attached to 307th Bombardment Wing)
- Fifteenth Air Force, 16 December 1948
- First Air Force, 22 August – 2 October 1949
- Air Training Command, 1 February 1973 – 31 March 1993
- Second Air Force, 1 July 1993 – present

=== Components ===
Groups

- 82nd Airdrome Group (later 82nd Air Base Group, 82nd Support Group, 82nd Mission Support Group): 15 August 1947 – 2 October 1949, 1 February 1973 – 31 March 1993, 1 June 1993 – present
- 82nd Field Training Group (later 982nd Training Group): 1 June 1993 – present
- 82nd Fighter Group (later 82nd Operations Group): 15 August 1947 – 2 October 1949 (detached 4–29 April June 1948), 15 December 1991 – 31 March 1993
- 82nd Maintenance & Supply Group (later 82nd Logistics Group): 15 August 1947 – 2 October 1949, 15 December 1991 – 31 March 1993, 1 July 1993 – 1 August 2002
- 82nd Medical Training Group (later 882nd Training Group): 1 June 1993 – 15 September 2011
- 82 Station Medical Group (later 82nd Medical Group, 82nd Flying Training Wing Clinic, 82nd Medical Squadron, 82nd Medical Group): 15 August 1947 – 2 October 1949, 1988 – 31 March 1993, 1 June 1993 – present
- 82nd Technical Training Group (later 82nd Training Group): c. 1 June 1993 – present
- 782nd Training Group: c. 1 July 1994 – present
- 882nd Training Group (see 82nd Medical Training Group)
- 982nd Training Group (see 82nd Field Training Group)

Squadrons

- 82nd Comptroller Squadron: 1 June 1993 – present
- 82nd Field Maintenance Squadron, 1 February 1973 – 3 April 1990
- 82nd Medical Squadron (see 82nd Station Medical Group)
- 82nd Organizational Maintenance Squadron, 1 February 1973 – c. 3 April 1990
- 96th Flying Training Squadron: 1 February 1973 – 15 December 1991
- 97th Flying Training Squadron: 1 February 1973 – 15 December 1991
- 98th Flying Training Squadron: 1 June 1988 – 15 December 1991
- 99th Flying Training Squadron: 1 June 1988 – 15 December 1991
- 100th Flying Training Squadron: 1 September 1989 – 15 December 1991

Other

- USAF Hospital, Williams: 15 October 1970 – 1988 (consolidated with 82nd Station Medical Group)
- 82nd Flying Training Wing Clinic (see 82nd Station Medical Group)

=== Stations ===
- Grenier Field (later Grenier Air Force Base), New Hampshire, 15 August 1947 – 2 October 1949
- Williams Air Force Base, Arizona, 1 February 1973 – 31 March 1993
- Sheppard Air Force Base, Texas, 1 July 1993 – present

=== Aircraft operated ===
- North American P-51 Mustang (later F-51) (1947–1949)
- Cessna T-37 Tweet (1973–1992)
- Northrop T-38 Talon (1973–1993)

== Bibliography ==
- Ravenstein, Charles A. (1984). Air Force Combat Wings, Lineage & Honors Histories 1947–1977. Washington, DC: Office of Air Force History. ISBN 0-912799-12-9.
- Tuttle, Dwight W.; Fosty, George R.; Boyd, Gary W. (1991). Sustaining the Wings: A Fifty-Year History of Sheppard Air Force Base, 1941–1991. Midwestern State University Press. ISBN 0915323044.
