= Lecce Airfield =

Italian WWII military airfield

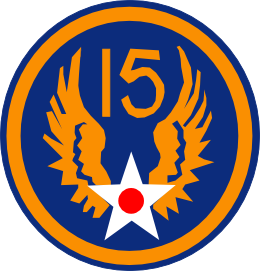
Lecce Airfield

Site information
- Type: Military airfield
- Controlled by: United States Army Air Forces

Location
- Coordinates: 40°14′30″N 018°7′59.75″E

Site history
- Built: 1943
- In use: 1943-1945

Location of Lecce Airfield, Italy

Lecce Airfield is an abandoned World War II military airfield in Italy, which is located approximately 8.5 miles southwest from Lecce in the Salentine Peninsula. Built in 1943 by United States Army Engineers, the airfield was primarily a Fifteenth Air Force B-24 Liberator heavy bomber base used in the strategic bombing of Germany. Lecce was also used by tactical aircraft of Twelfth Air Force in the Italian Campaign.

Known units assigned to the airfield were:

- 98th Bombardment Group, 17 January 1944 – 19 April 1945, B-24 Liberator, (15AF)
- 82d Fighter Group, 10 October 1943 – 11 January 1944, P-38 Lightning, (12AF)
- 416th Night Fighter Squadron, 27–30 September 1943, Bristol Beaufighter (12 AF)

The airfield today operates as Aviosuperficie Lecce Fondone, military operaciones shifted to Lecce Galatina Air Base.
