= Grombalia Airfield =

Abandoned Tunisian military airfield

Grombalia Airfield
- Part of Twelfth Air Force

Site information
- Type: Military airfield
- Controlled by: United States Army Air Forces

Location
- Coordinates: 36°40′39.29″N 010°26′41.26″E

Site history
- Built: 1943
- In use: 1943

Location of Grombalia Airfield, Tunisia

Grombalia Airfield is an abandoned World War II military airfield in Tunisia, which is located approximately 112 kilometres (70 mi) east-southeast of Hammam-Lif, about 16 kilometres (9.9 mi) southeast of Tunis. It was a temporary airfield constructed by Army Engineers using Pierced Steel Planking (PSP) for its runway, parking and dispersal areas. It was not designed for heavy aircraft or for long-term use.

It was used by the United States Army Air Force Twelfth Air Force 82d Fighter Group during the North African Campaign, flying P-38 Lightnings from the airfield between August and October 1943.

After the Americans moved east in October, the airfield was closed and dismantled. Today, the former main runway is visible in aerial photography, however no buildings or physical features remain.
