= San Pancrazio Airfield =

Abandoned World War II airfield in Italy

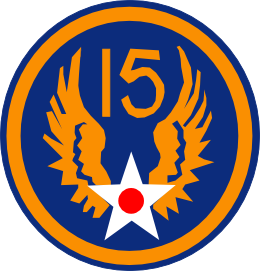
San Pancrazio Airfield

Site information
- Type: Military airfield
- Controlled by: United States Army Air Forces
- Condition: Semi-derelict

Location
- Coordinates: 40°26′18.50″N 017°51′23.69″E

Site history
- Built: 1943
- In use: 1943-1945

Location ofSan Pancrazio Airfield, Italy

San Pancrazio Airfield is an abandoned Second World War military airfield in Italy, located approximately 4 km northeast of San Pancrazio Salentino in the province of Brindisi in Apulia, on the south-east Italy coast. Built in 1943 by United States Army Engineers, the airfield was primarily a Fifteenth Air Force B-24 Liberator heavy bomber base used in the strategic bombing of Germany. San Pancrazio was also used by tactical aircraft of Twelfth Air Force in the Italian Campaign.

Known units assigned to the airfield were:

- 82d Fighter Group, 3–10 October 1943, P-38 Lightning, (12AF)
- 340th Bombardment Group, 16 October-19 November 1943, B-25 Mitchell, (12AF)
- 376th Bombardment Group, 17 November 1943 – 19 April 1945, B-24 Liberator, (15AF)
- 451st Bombardment Group, 5 March-6 April 1944, B-24 Liberator, (15AF)

San Pancrazio Airfield is probably the best-preserved American heavy bomber base in Italy. Most of the main runway and taxiways remain, along with numerous dispersal pads. Numerous remains of wartime buildings are also visible. After the war, the airfield may have been used as San Pancrazio Airport, but today several agricultural buildings are on the main runway. The grass areas of the airfield are used as agricultural fields, but most of the concreted areas remain.
