= 32nd Air Division =

32d Air Division
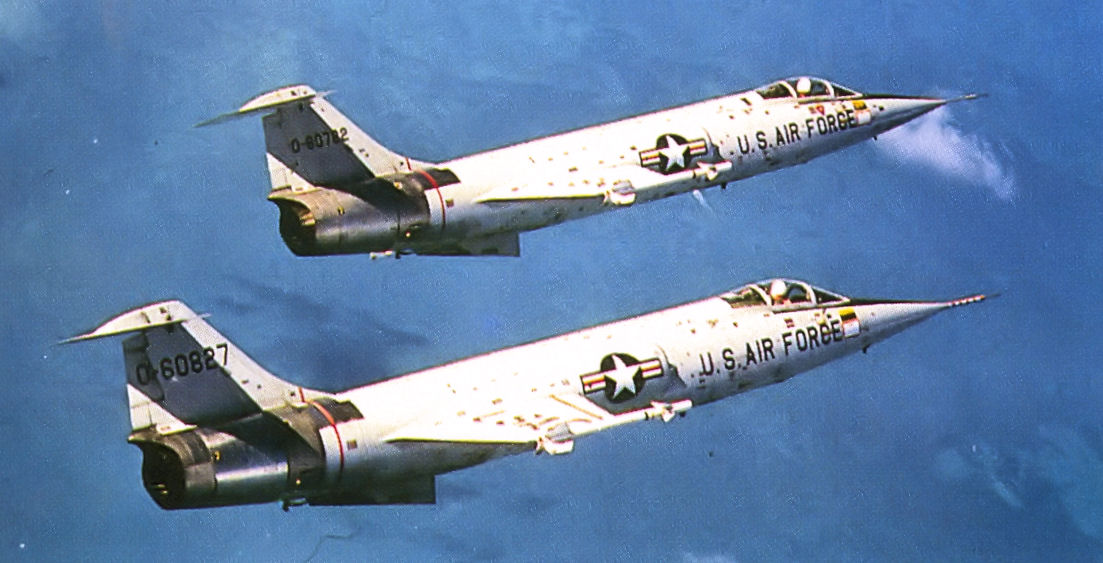
- Lockheed F-104s of the 319th Fighter-Interceptor Squadron over Biscayne Bay, Florida
- Active: 1949–1958; 1958–1963; 1966-1969
- Country: United States
- Branch: United States Air Force
- Role: Command and Control
- Part of: Air Defense Command

Insignia
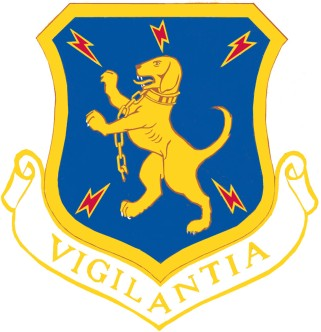
- 32d Air Division emblem (approved 4 March 1953)

The 32d Air Division (32d AD) is an inactive United States Air Force organization. It was last active with Air Defense Command, assigned to First Air Force at Gunter Air Force Base, Alabama, where it was inactivated on 31 December 1969.

The division was first activated by Continental Air Command in November 1949 at Stewart Air Force Base, New York. It controlled air defense units in the northeastern United States from Stewart, and later from Hancock Field, New York until being inactivated in August 1958.

The division was activated again in November 1958 at Dobbins Air Force Base, Georgia to provide air defense of the southeastern United States, moving to Oklahoma City Air Force Station, Oklahoma in 1961. During the Cuban Missile Crisis, it was the primary air defense command for potential attacks from Cuba, acting through its Montgomery Air Defense Sector and a provisional organization at Key West Naval Air Station. The division was inactivated in September 1963.

In April 1966, the 32d was again activated at Gunter, where it replaced the Montgomery Air Defense Sector. At Gunter, it also reported to North American Air Defense Command (NORAD) as the 32d NORAD Region. It was again responsible for air defense in the Southeast until 1969, when its mission, personnel and equipment were transferred to the 20th Air Division.

== History ==
=== Air Defense of the Northeast ===
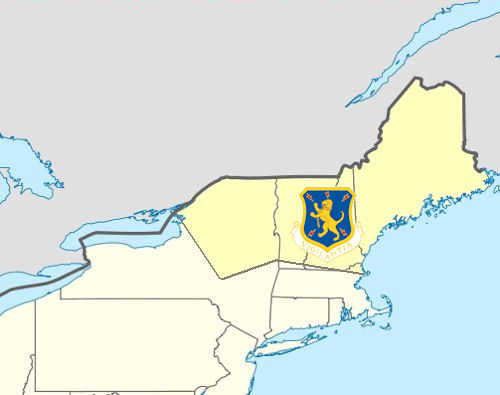
32d Air Division AOR 1952–1958

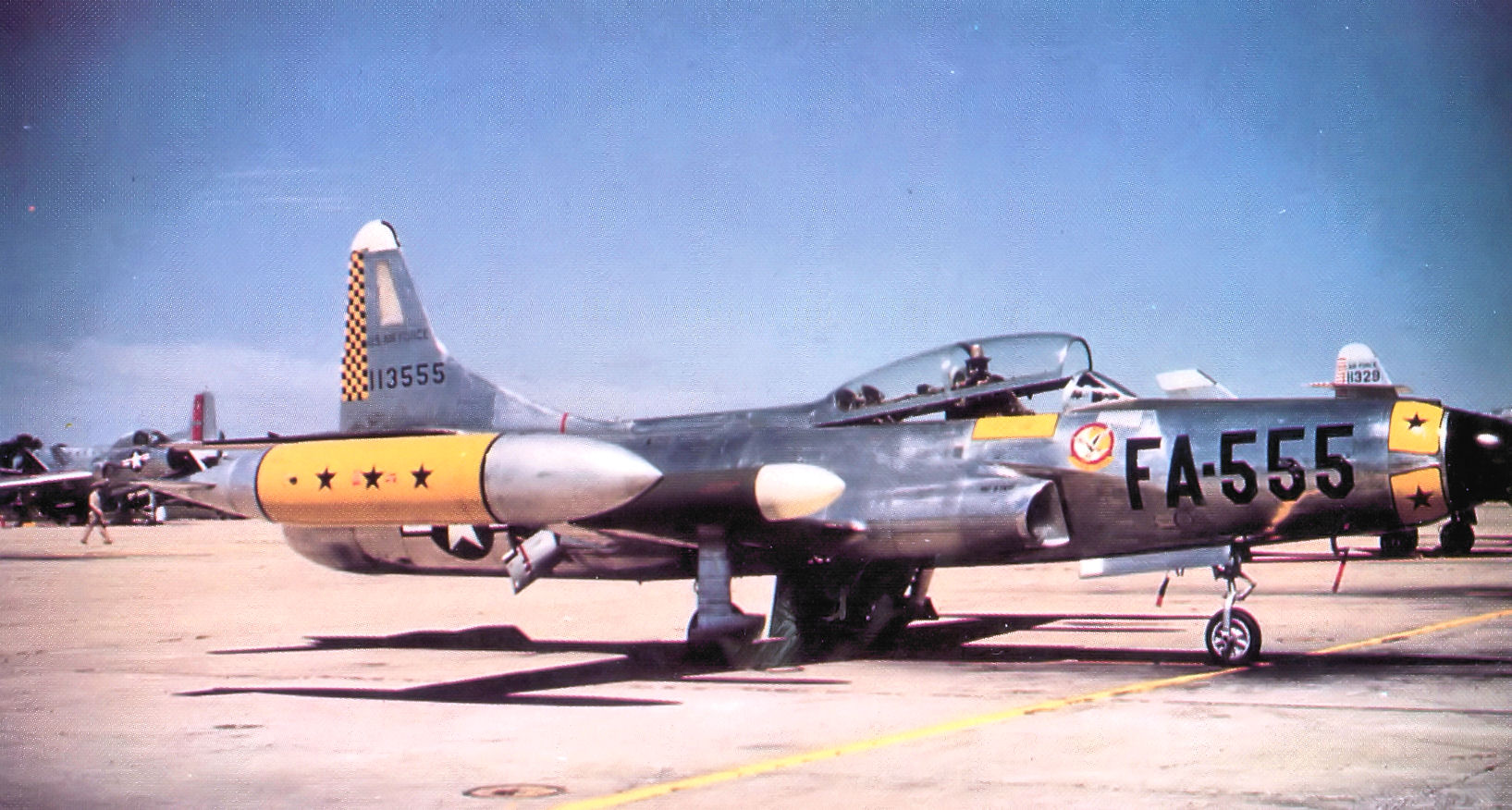
27th Fighter-Interceptor Squadron F-94C at Griffiss AFB 1954

Assigned to Air Defense Command (ADC) for most of its existence, the 32d organized, administered, equipped, trained, and prepared for operation, all of its assigned units. The division participated in exercises such as Creek Brave, Top Rung and Natchez Echo. Initially, it assumed responsibility for an area including Maine, Vermont, Massachusetts, New Hampshire, and part of New York.

=== Cuban Missile Crisis ===
During the Cuban Missile Crisis, as the division responsible for defense of the area nearest Cuba, the division role expanded. In addition to defense of its area of responsibility, the division (acting largely through its Montgomery Air Defense Sector and Task Force 32, which was established for Continental Air Defense Command and included an operating location at Key West Naval Air Station, Florida) was responsible to defend staging bases and routes to possible drop zones in Cuba for troop carrier units.

Radar warning capabilities were increased. Four destroyers in the Straits of Florida, whose primary mission was to provide navigation guidance to potential strike aircraft, began to provide low altitude radar coverage as a secondary mission on 23 October, and the USS Consult was added as a picket ship. The number of Lockheed EC-121 Warning Star airborne early warning and control aircraft at McCoy Air Force Base, Florida was increased from three to six. On 24 October VAW-14 deployed six Grumman WF-2s to Jacksonville Naval Air Station. These planes moved to Key West on 26 October.

At the same time additional interceptor aircraft were put under the division's control. Initially, the aircraft of the training wing at Tyndall Air Force Base, Florida were put on alert at Tyndall and other Florida bases, as was a detachment of VF(AW)-3 at Key West. The Tyndall forces included 17 McDonnell F-101 Voodoos, 18 Convair F-106 Delta Darts and 9 Convair F-102 Delta Daggers, and were the main element in increasing the ADC alert force in Florida from 4 to 74 planes in 48 hours. TF-102 trainers were placed on alert at Homestead, Patrick, McCoy, and MacDill. The Navy fighter detachment was also transferred to the division's control.

Twelve McDonnell F-4 Phantom IIs of VF-41 moved to augment air defense forces on Key West, and additional crews were added to the VF(AW)-3 detachment to permit it to maintain aircraft on continuous alert. The 331st Fighter-Interceptor Squadron deployed 18 Delta Daggers to Homestead Air Force Base bringing the number of Deuces there to 32. However, the F-102s of the 331st were soon replaced with F-102s from 325th Fighter-Interceptor Squadron in order to have planes armed with Mighty Mouse rockets to improve low altitude intercept capability Patrick Air Force Base, Florida received a dozen Delta Darts from the 49th Fighter-Interceptor Squadron.

To improve fighter-on-fighter capability draft mobilization orders were issued for the 122d, 151st, 157th and 159th Fighter-Interceptor Squadrons, but were never finalized and the Air National Guard did not take part in the crisis. The alert status of the division's fighters included airborne alert against dawn raids early in crisis. The "Strategic Orbit Points" for airborne fighters were manned by 10 planes (later reduced to 4 planes). Alert planes were also placed in "sling shot" status (engines running). This was later reduced to alert crews in the planes' cockpit near the runway.

Army air defense forces also came under the division's control. A battery of MIM-23 Hawk missiles from the 6th Battalion, 61st Artillery was transferred from Fort Meade to defend Key West. Homestead received a 40mm automatic weapons battery from the 1st Battalion, 59th Artillery and on 31 October. a Nike Hercules battery from the 2nd Battalion, 52nd Artillery at Fort Bliss as well as a Hawk batteries on 2 November. Hawks from the 8th Battalion, 15th Artillery at Fort Lewis were also deployed to MacDill Air Force Base and to Patrick.

As the crisis eased, most units were released on 29 November, and except for forces retained against possible future threats from Cuba, the remaining forces were returned to their normal status by 3 December.

=== Air defense of the Southeast ===
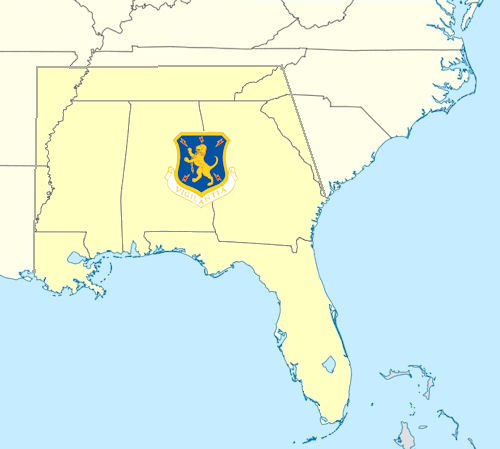
32d Air Division AOR 1966–1969

Later, beginning in 1966, the area expanded to include Mississippi, Alabama, Georgia, and parts of South Carolina, Louisiana and Florida when it assumed responsibility for the mission of the inactivated Montgomery Air Defense Sector. Assumed additional designation of 32d NORAD Region after activation of the NORAD Combat Operations Center at the Cheyenne Mountain Complex, Colorado and reporting was transferred to NORAD from ADC at Ent Air Force Base in April 1966.

Inactivated in November 1969 as ADC phased down its interceptor mission as the chances of a Soviet bomber attack on the United States seemed remote, its mission being consolidated into the 23d Air Division.

=== Lineage ===
- Established as 32d Air Division (Defense) on 8 November 1949

Activated on 8 December 1949
Inactivated on 1 February 1952

- Organized on 1 February 1952

Inactivated on 15 August 1958

- Redesignated 32d Air Division (SAGE) on 21 October 1958

Activated on 15 November 1958
Discontinued and inactivated, on 4 September 1963

- Redesignated 32d Air Division and activated on 20 January 1966 (not organized)

Organized on 1 April 1966
Inactivated on 31 December 1969

=== Assignments ===
- First Air Force, 8 December 1949
- Eastern Air Defense Force, 1 September 1950 – 1 February 1952.
- Eastern Air Defense Force, 1 February 1952 – 15 August 1958
- Eastern Air Defense Force, 15 November 1958
- Air Defense Command, 1 August 1959 – 4 September 1963
- Air Defense Command, 20 January 1966
- Fourteenth Air Force, 1 April 1966
- First Air Force, 1 July 1968 – 31 December 1969

=== Stations ===
- Stewart Air Force Base, New York, 8 December 1949 – 12 February 1952
- Hancock Field (later Syracuse Air Force Station), New York, 12 February 1952 – 15 August 1958
- Dobbins Air Force Base, Georgia, 15 November 1958
- Oklahoma City Air Force Station, Oklahoma, 1 August 1961 – 4 September 1963
- Gunter Air Force Base, Alabama, 1 April 1966 – 31 December 1969.

=== Components ===
==== Sectors ====
- Bangor Air Defense Sector: 8 January 1957 – 15 August 1958

Topsham Air Force Station, Maine

- Montgomery Air Defense Sector: 15 November 1958 – 1 July 1963

Gunter Air Force Station, Alabama

- Oklahoma City Air Defense Sector (Manual): 1 July – 1 September 1961

Oklahoma City Air Force Station, Oklahoma
Syracuse Air Defense Sector
Syracuse Air Force Station, New York

==== Wings ====
- 33d Fighter-Interceptor Wing: attached 20 February 1950 – 1 February 1952

Otis Air Force Base, Massachusetts

- 4624th Air Defense Wing (later Syracuse Air Defense Sector): 1 October 1956 – 15 August 1958

Syracuse Air Force Station, New York

- 4707th Defense (later 4707th Air Defense Wing): 16 February 1953 – 1 March 1956

Niagara Falls Municipal Airport, New York

- 4711th Defense Wing (later 4711th Air Defense Wing): 16 February 1953 – 1 March 1956

Presque Isle Air Force Base, Maine

- 4752d Air Defense Wing: 1 September 1961 – 25 June 1963

Oklahoma City Air Force Station, Oklahoma

==== Groups ====
- 14th Fighter Group: 1 March 1956 – August 1958

Ethan Allen Air Force Base, Vermont

- 23d Fighter Group: 1 March 1956 – 1 August 1958

Presque Isle Air Force Base, Maine

- 540th Aircraft Control and Warning Group, 1 January 1951 – 6 February 1952
- 4727th Air Defense Group: 8 February 1957 – 1 August 1958

Griffiss Air Force Base, New York

==== Interceptor squadrons ====
- 27th Fighter-Interceptor Squadron: 1 March 1956 – 8 February 1957

Griffiss Air Force Base, New York

- 49th Fighter-Interceptor Squadron: 16 June 1956 – 1 August 1958

Hanscom Field, Massachusetts

- 76th Fighter-Interceptor Squadron: 15 November 1958 – 1 February 1961

Pinecastle Air Force Base (later McCoy Air Force Base), Florida

- 319th Fighter-Interceptor Squadron: 1 April 1966 – 31 December 1969

Homestead Air Force Base, Florida

- 444th Fighter-Interceptor Squadron: 15 November 1958 – 1 July 1961

Charleston Air Force Base, South Carolina

- 465th Fighter-Interceptor Squadron: 1 March 1956 – 8 February 1957

Griffiss Air Force Base, New York

- 482d Fighter-Interceptor Squadron: 15 November 1958 – 1 July 1961

Seymour Johnson Air Force Base, North Carolina

==== Radar squadrons ====
- 609th Radar Squadron

Eufaula Air Force Station, Alabama, 15 November 1958 – 1 November 1959; 1 April 1966 – 8 September 1968

- 614th Radar Squadron

Cherry Point Marine Corps Air Station, North Carolina, 1 December 1952 – 16 February 1953; 15 November 1958 – 1 July 1961

- 627th Radar Squadron

Crystal Springs Air Force Station, Mississippi, 15 November 1958 – 1 November 1959; 1 April 1966 – 8 September 1968

- 644th Radar Squadron

Richmond Air Force Station, Florida, 1 April 1966 – 14 November 1969

- 645th Radar Squadron

Patrick Air Force Base, Florida, 1 April 1966 – 14 November 1969

- 654th Aircraft Control and Warning Squadron

Brunswick Air Force Station, Maine, 6 February 1952 – 16 February 1956; 1 March 1956 – 15 August 1958

- 655th Aircraft Control and Warning Squadron

Watertown Air Force Station, New York, 6 February 1952 – 16 February 1953; 1 March 1956 – 1 September 1958

- 657th Radar Squadron

Houma Air Force Station, Louisiana, 15 November 1958 – 1 November 1959; 1 April 1966 – 14 November 1969

- 660th Radar Squadron

MacDill Air Force Base, Florida, 15 November 1958 – 1 November 1959; 1 April 1966 – 14 November 1969

- 663d Aircraft Control and Warning Squadron

Lake City Air Force Station, Tennessee, 15 November 1958 – 1 June 1961

- 671st Radar Squadron

Key West Naval Air Station, Florida, 1 April 1966 – 14 November 1969

- 672d Aircraft Control and Warning Squadron

Barrington Air Station, Nova Scotia, 1 December 1956 – 15 August 1958

- 678th Radar Squadron

Tyndall Air Force Base, Florida, 1 April 1966 – 14 November 1969

- 679th Radar Squadron

Jacksonville Naval Air Station, Florida, 15 November 1958 – 1 November 1959; 1 April 1966 – 14 November 1969

- 691st Radar Squadron

Cross City Air Force Station, Florida, 15 November 1958 – 1 November 1959; 1 April 1966 – 14 November 1969

- 693d Radar Squadron

Dauphin Island Air Force Station, Alabama, 15 November 1958 – 1 November 1959; 1 April 1966 – 14 November 1969

- 698th Radar Squadron

Thomasville Air Force Station, Alabama, 15 November 1958 – 1 November 1959; 1 April 1966 – 31 December 1969

- 702d Radar Squadron

Savannah Air Force Station, Georgia, 1 April 1966 – 14 November 1969

- 762d Aircraft Control and Warning Squadron

North Truro Air Force Station, Massachusetts, 6 February 1952 – 16 February 1953

- 763d Aircraft Control and Warning Squadron

Lockport Air Force Station, New York, 6 February 1952 – 16 February 1953

- 764th Aircraft Control and Warning Squadron

Saint Albans Air Force Station, Vermont, 1 March 1956 – 15 August 1958

- 765th Aircraft Control and Warning Squadron

Charleston Air Force Station, Maine, 1 March 1956 – 15 August 1958

- 766th Aircraft Control and Warning Squadron

Caswell Air Force Station, Maine, 1 March 1956 – 15 August 1958

- 783d Aircraft Control and Warning Squadron

Guthrie Air Force Station, West Virginia, 15 November 1958 – 1 June 1961

- 784th Aircraft Control and Warning Squadron

Snow Mountain Air Force Station, Kentucky, 15 November 1958 – 1 June 1961

- 792d Aircraft Control and Warning Squadron

North Charleston Air Force Station, South Carolina, 1 November 24 December 1953; 15 November 1958 – 1 July 1961

- 799th Aircraft Control and Warning Squadron

Joelton Air Force Station, Tennessee, 15 November 1958 – 1 June 1961

- 810th Aircraft Control and Warning Squadron

Winston-Salem Air Force Station, North Carolina, 15 November 1958 – 1 July 1961

- 861st Radar Squadron

Aiken Air Force Station, South Carolina, 15 November 1958 – 1 July 1961; 1 April 1966 – 14 November 1969

- 867th Aircraft Control and Warning Squadron

Flintstone Air Force Station, Georgia, 15 November 1958 – 25 July 1960

- 908th Radar Squadron

Marietta Air Force Station, Georgia, 15 November 1958 – 1 July 1961; 1 April 1966 – 8 September 1968

- 911th Aircraft Control and Warning Squadron

Lyndonville Air Force Station, Vermont, 1 March 1956 – 15 August 1958

- 912th Aircraft Control and Warning Squadron

Ramore Air Station, Ontario, 10 March 1952 – 21 December 1952

- 913th Aircraft Control and Warning Squadron

Pagwa Air Station, Ontario, 10 March 1952 – 20 December 1952

- 915th Aircraft Control and Warning Squadron

Sioux Lookout Air Station, Ontario, 10 March 1952 – 16 December 1952

- 916th Aircraft Control and Warning Squadron

Beausejour Air Station, Manitoba, 12 February-1 December 1952

== See also ==
- List of USAF Aerospace Defense Command General Surveillance Radar Stations
- Aerospace Defense Command Fighter Squadrons
- List of United States Air Force air divisions
