= Southeast Air Defense Sector =

Former unit of the US Air Force

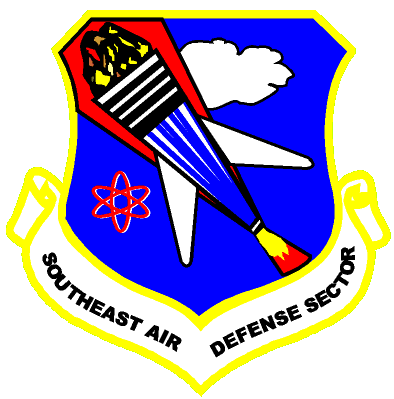
- Southeast Air Defense Sector Emblem
- Active: 1987–2006
- Country: United States
- Branch: United States Air Force
- Role: Air Defense

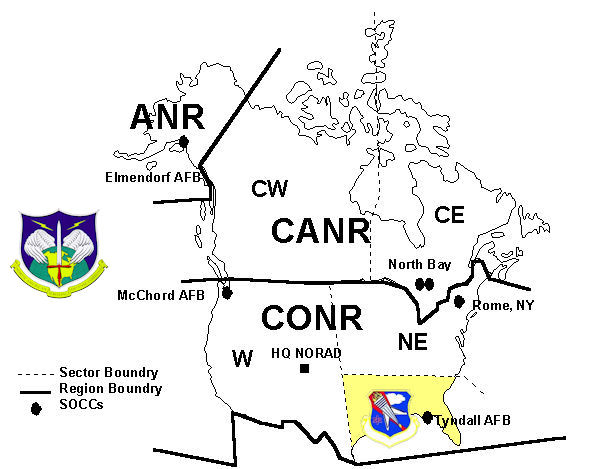
SEADS Region shown in NORAD Region/Sector Configuration, 1987-2005

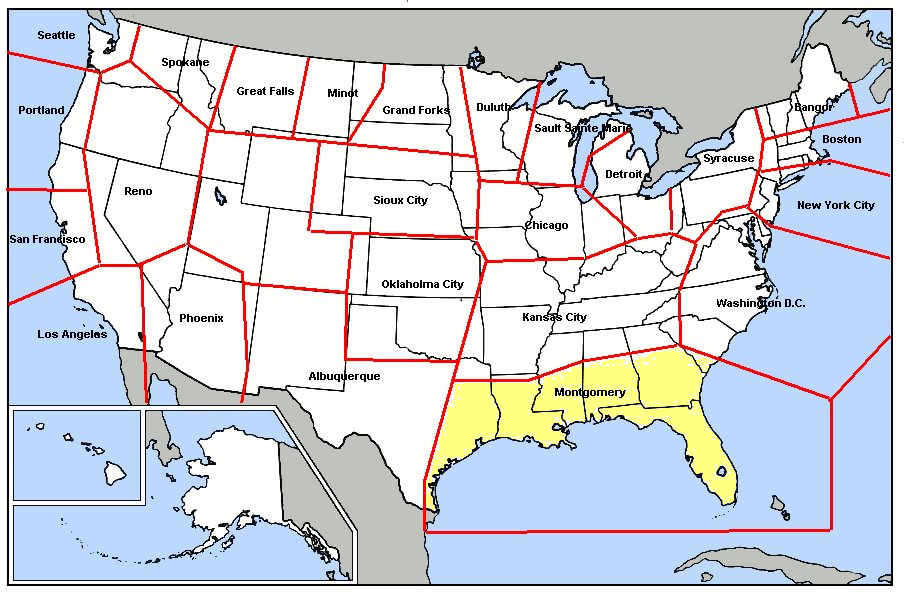
Historical map of Montgomery Air Defense Sector, 1957-1966

The Southeast Air Defense Sector (SEADS), was a unit of the US Air Force located at Tyndall Air Force Base near Panama City, Florida. It provided air defense and surveillance of the southeastern region of the US. SEADS closed in winter 2005, giving up surveillance and control of their airspace to the Eastern Air Defense Sector (EADS) and the former Northeast Air Defense Sector (NEADS).

== History ==
=== Cold War ===
The origins of the Southeast Air Defense Sector (SEADS) are in September 1957 with the formation of its predecessor organization, the Montgomery Air Defense Sector (MoADS) by Air Defense Command (ADC). It was established in September 1957 with a mission to train and maintain tactical flying units in state of readiness in order to defend the Southeastern United States, assuming control of former ADC Central Air Defense Force units. Its original region consisted of ADC atmospheric forces (fighter-interceptor and radar units) located east of the Mississippi River, south of the 34th parallel north and east to a designated line west of the 86th meridian west, southeast to the southernmost point of Key Largo Island, Florida.

It was consolidated on 1 January 1959 with the Shreveport and Miami Air Defense Sectors, defining a region south of 34th parallel north, bordering on the east along the intersection of the parallel southeast along the Georgia–South Carolina border to the Atlantic coastline. In the west, the sector was responsible for most of Eastern Texas south of the 34th parallel north, including the state of Louisiana, eastwards. It operated a Manual Air Direction Center (MDC) at Dobbins AFB, Georgia. The sector's mission was to train and maintain tactical flying units in state of readiness in order to defend the northeast United States while initially continuing to operate the MDC.

Beginning on 1 July 1958, it began operations of a SAGE (Semi-Automatic Ground Environment) Direction Center DC-09 32°45′15″N 086°14′29″W at Gunter AFB, Alabama.

During the Cuban Missile Crisis, MoADS was the forward command center for Continental Air Defense Command, remaining on heightened alert for 36 days as part of Task Force 32. This period of constant alert was the longest alert period for any organization during the Cold War

On 1 April 1966, MoADS was inactivated, as were the other 22 sectors in the country. Most of its assets were assumed by the 32d Air Division; the 33d Air Division assumed assets in eastern North and South Carolina. The DC-09 SAGE Direction Center was assigned to the 32d Air Division, remaining in operation until 31 December 1969. Today it is used as offices by Air University, Air Education and Training Command at Gunter AFB.

=== Modern era ===
On 1 July 1987, the Montgomery Air Defense Sector (MOADS) was reactivated, and co-located with the 23d Air Division. The 23d Air Division was inactivated and all atmospheric defense assets of the Division were transferred to the MOADS, re-designated the Southeast Air Defense Sector (SEADS).

SEADS was responsible for the atmospheric defense of approximately 1,000,000 square miles (2,600,000 km^{2}) of airspace and 3,000 miles (4,800 km) of coastline extending from Virginia to Texas. It was the busiest of the air defense sectors comprising the NORAD Continental United States North American Aerospace Defense Command Region. It operated a Sector Operations Control Center (SOCC) at Tyndall AFB, part of the Joint Surveillance System (JSS) which had replaced SAGE in 1983. This system, using the latest advances in computerized airspace control, relied on digitized radar inputs from Air Route Surveillance Radar (ARSR) sites jointly operated by the Federal Aviation Administration and the Air Force, and tethered aerostat radar balloons. More than 2,000 aircraft were detected and identified each day by SEADS technicians and operators.

On 1 October 1995, the Southeast Air Defense Sector was reassigned to the Florida Air National Guard; SEADS re-designated Southeast Air Defense Sector (ANG). It came under the Continental NORAD Region (CONR) Headquarters at Tyndall AFB, Florida.

On 1 November 2005, SEADS ceased air defense operations and its duties were absorbed into the Northeast Air Defense Sector which is now known as the Eastern Air Defense Sector. The SEADS transformed into the 601st Air and Space Operations Center and currently performs the duties as the Air Operations Center for AFNORTH.

Known Air National Guard units with an air defense mission under EADS were:

- 187th Fighter Wing (F-16), Alabama ANG, Montgomery, Alabama
- 125th Fighter Wing (F-15), Florida ANG, Jacksonville, Florida
- 183d Fighter Wing (F-16), Illinois ANG, Springfield, Illinois
- 159th Fighter Wing, (F-15), Louisiana ANG, New Orleans, Louisiana
- 169th Fighter Wing (F-16), South Carolina ANG, Eastover, South Carolina

== Lineage ==
- Designated as Montgomery Air Defense Sector and organized on 8 September 1957

Discontinued on 1 April 1966

- Redesignated as Southeast Air Defense Sector and activated on 1 July 1987

Inactivated on 1 November 2005

=== Assignments ===
- 35th Air Division, 8 September 1957
- 32d Air Division, 15 November 1958
- 26th Air Division, 1 July 1963
- 73d Air Division, 1 October 1964 - 1 April 1966
- 23d Air Division, 1 July 1987
- Florida Air National Guard, 1 October 1996 – 1 November 2005

=== Stations ===
- Gunter AFB, Alabama, 8 September 1957 - 1 April 1966
- Tyndall AFB, Florida, 1 July 1987 – 1 November 2005

=== Components ===
==== Wing ====
- 4751st Air Defense Wing (Missile)

Eglin AFB Auxiliary Field #9, Florida, 1 October 1959 - 1 July 1962

==== Interceptor Squadrons ====
- 48th Fighter-Interceptor Squadron

Langley AFB, Virginia, 1987-1991

- 319th Fighter Interceptor Training Squadron

Homestead AFB, Florida, 1 March 1963 – 1 April 1966

- 482d Fighter-Interceptor Squadron

Seymour-Johnson AFB, North Carolina, 1 July 1965 – 1 April 1966

==== Missile Squadron ====
- 4751st Air Defense Squadron (Missile)

Eglin AFB Auxiliary Field #9, Florida, 1 July 1962 – 1 July 1963

==== Radar Squadrons ====
- 609th Radar Squadron (SAGE)

Eufaula AFS, Alabama, 1 November 1959 - 1 April 1966

- 627th Radar Squadron (SAGE)

Crystal Springs AFS, Mississippi, 1 November 1959 - 1 April 1966

- 644th Radar Squadron (SAGE)

Homestead AFB, Florida, 25 April 1960 - 1 April 1966

- 657th Aircraft Control & Warning Squadron (later 657th Radar Squadron (SAGE))

Houma AFS, Louisiana, 1 November 1959 - 1 April 1966

- 660th Aircraft Control & Warning Squadron (later 660th Radar Squadron (SAGE))

MacDill AFB, Florida, 1 November 1959 - 1 April 1966

- 678th Aircraft Control & Warning Squadron (later 678th Radar Squadron (SAGE))

Tyndall AFB, Florida, 1 November 1959 - 1 April 1966

- 679th Aircraft Control & Warning Squadron (later 679th Radar Squadron (SAGE))

NAS Jacksonville, Florida, 1 July 1961 - 1 April 1966

- 691st Radar Squadron (SAGE)

Cross City AFS, Florida, 1 November 1959 - 1 April 1966

- 693d Aircraft Control & Warning Squadron (later 693d Radar Squadron (SAGE))

Dauphin Island AFS, Alabama, 1 November 1959 - 1 April 1966

- 698th Radar Squadron (SAGE)

Thomasville AFS, Alabama, 1 November 1959 - 1 April 1966

- 702d Aircraft Control & Warning Squadron (later 702d Radar Squadron (SAGE))

Hunter AFB, Georgia, 1 July 1961 - 1 April 1966

- 861st Aircraft Control & Warning Squadron (later 861st Radar Squadron (SAGE))

Aiken AFS, South Carolina, 1 July 1961 - 1 April 1966

- 908th Aircraft Control & Warning Squadron (later 908th Radar Squadron (SAGE))

Marietta AFS, Georgia, 1 July 1961 - 1 April 1966

== See also ==
- List of MAJCOM wings of the United States Air Force
- List of USAF Aerospace Defense Command General Surveillance Radar Stations
- Aerospace Defense Command Fighter Squadrons
- Alaskan Air Defense Sector (176th Air Control Squadron)
- Hawaii Region Air Operations Center (169th Aircraft Control and Warning Squadron)
- North American Aerospace Defense Command
- Western Air Defense Sector
- Eastern Air Defense Sector
- Southwest Air Defense Sector
