= 701st Air Defense Squadron =

Former US Air National Guard unit

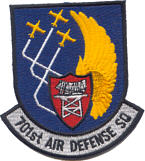
Patch showing the emblem of the 701st Air Defense Squadron patch.

The 701st Air Defense Squadron was an Air National Guard unit stationed at Tyndall Air Force Base near Panama City, Florida. As part of First Air Force, it was responsible for the operation of NORAD's Continental United States Region Air Operations Center. The 701st was inactivated in 2007 and replaced with the 601st Air & Space Operations Center, which later became the 601st Air Operations Center.

== History ==
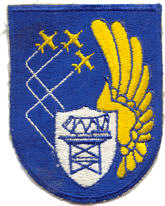
Patch showing the emblem of the 701st Aircraft Control and Warning Squadron and 701st Radar Squadron.

Before becoming the 701st ADS, the unit was known as the 701st Aircraft Control and Warning Squadron and the 701st Radar Squadron. For most of its existence, the unit was located at Fort Fisher Air Force Station near Kure Beach, North Carolina. With the closure of Fort Fisher AFS in the late 1980s, the 701st was moved to Langley Air Force Base, Virginia and collocated with First Air Force headquarters. During this time the unit also became the 701st Air Defense Squadron. In 1991, both First Air Force and the 701st relocated to Tyndall AFB. Between 1995 and 1997, both organizations transitioned from the US Air Force to the Air National Guard. As part of the transition, active duty 701st military personnel were replaced with members of the Florida Air National Guard. After the 11 September attacks, the role of homeland defense was greatly expanded necessitating a restructuring of First Air Force units. Part of this expansion was the inactivation of the 701st and its replacement by the 601st Air Operations Group.

=== Lineage ===
- Established as the 701st Aircraft Control and Warning Squadron

Activated on 1 December 1953
Redesignated 701st Radar Squadron (SAGE) on 1 July 1962
Inactivated on 1 March 1970.
Redesignated 701st Radar Squadron
Activated on 17 January 1974
Inactivated on 30 June 1988
Redesignated 701st Air Defense Squadron
Activated 1990
Redesignated 701st Air Defense Squadron (ANG) on or about 16 October 1995 and allotted to the Air National Guard
Inactivated 1 November 2007

=== Stations ===
- Dobbins AFB, GA, 1 December 1953
- Fort Fisher AFS, NC, 1 Aug 1955 – 1 March 1970
- Fort Fisher AFS, NC 17 January 1974 – 30 June 1988
- Langley AFB, VA 1990
- Tyndall AFB, FL 12 September 1991 – 1 November 2007

=== Assignments ===
- 35th Air Division, 1 December 1953
- 85th Air Division, 1 March 1956
- 35th Air Division, 1 September 1958
- 32d Air Division, 15 November 1958
- Washington Air Defense Sector, 1 July 1961
- 33rd Air Division, 1 April 1966
- 20th Air Division, 19 November 1969 – 1 March 1970
- 20th Air Division, 17 January 1974
- 23d Air Division, 1 March 1983
- First Air Force, 1 July 1987
- Southeast Air Defense Sector, December 1987 – 30 June 1988
- First Air Force 1990 – 1 November 2007 (attached to Air Forces, Northern)
