= 35th Air Division =

Inactive US Air Force unit

35th Air Division

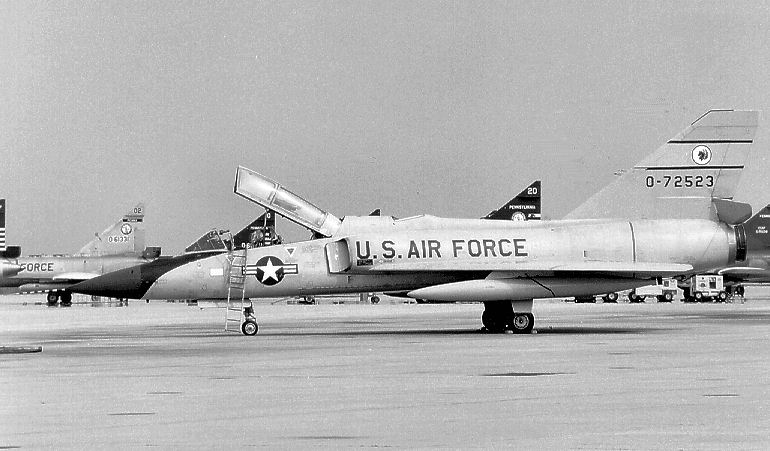
- F-106 of the division's 52d Fighter Group
- Active: 1951–1958; 1966–1969
- Country: United States
- Branch: United States Air Force
- Role: Command of air defense forces
- Part of: Air Defense Command

Insignia
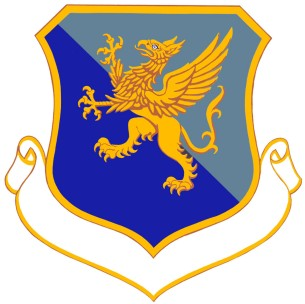
- 35th Air Division emblem (Approved 20 April 1966)

The 35th Air Division (35th AD) is an inactive United States Air Force organization. Its last assignment was with Air Defense Command, assigned to First Air Force, at Hancock Field, New York. It was inactivated on 19 November 1969.

== History ==
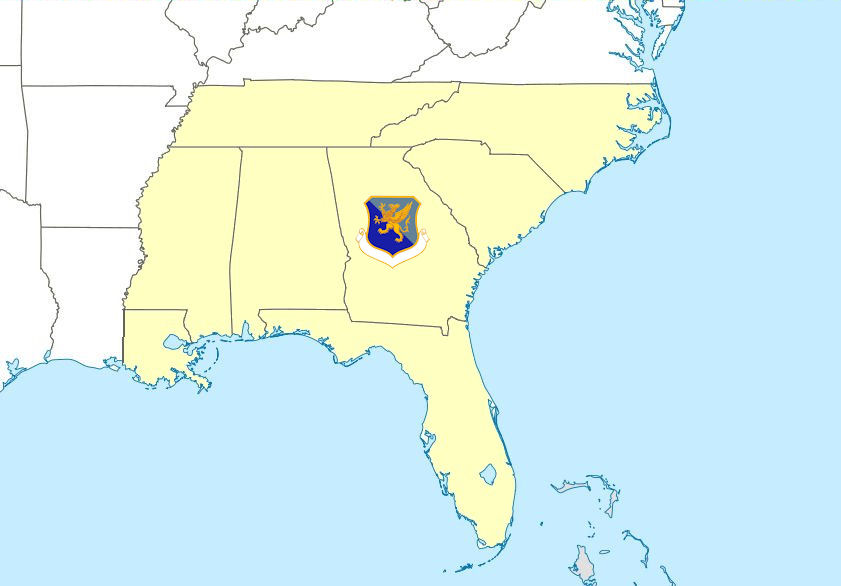
35th Air Division ADC AOR 1951–1958

Assigned to Air Defense Command (ADC) for most of its existence, from July 1951 – November 1969, the 35th "equipped, administered, and trained its assigned and attached units and placed those forces in a maximum state of readiness for use in air defense. Initially, its area of responsibility included all or part of Tennessee, North Carolina, South Carolina, Georgia, Alabama, Florida, and Mississippi".

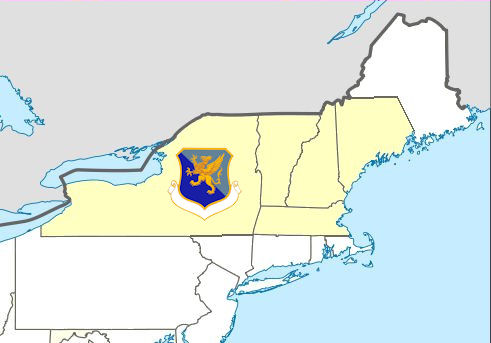
35th Air Division ADC AOR 1966–1969

"In 1966, the area changed to include most of New York, Vermont, New Hampshire, Massachusetts, and southern Maine when the division assumed the responsibilities of the inactivated Boston Air Defense Sector. "

Assumed additional designation of 35th NORAD Region after activation of the NORAD Combat Operations Center at the Cheyenne Mountain Complex, Colorado and reporting was transferred to NORAD from ADC at Ent Air Force Base in April 1966. "The division participated in numerous live and simulated exercises such as Apache Brave, Mohawk Echo, and Desk Top."

Inactivated in November 1969 as ADC phased down its interceptor mission as the chances of a Soviet bomber attack on the United States seemed remote, its mission being consolidated into North American Aerospace Defense Command (NORAD).

== Lineage ==
- Established as the 35 Air Division (Defense) on 11 June 1951

Activated on 1 July 1951
Inactivated on 1 February 1952

- Organized on 1 February 1952

Inactivated on 15 November 1958

- Redesignated 35 Air Division and activated on 20 January 1966 (not organized)

Organized on 1 April 1966
Inactivated on 19 November 1969

=== Assignments ===
- Central Air Defense Force, 1 July 1951 – 10 April 1955
- Eastern Air Defense Force, 10 April 1955 – 15 November 1958
- Air Defense Command, 20 January 1966 (not organized)
- First Air Force, 1 April 1966 – 19 November 1969

=== Stations ===
- Kansas City, Missouri, 1 July – 1 September 1951
- Dobbins Air Force Base, Georgia, 4 September 1951 – 15 November 1958
- Hancock Field, New York, 1 April 1966 – 19 November 1969

=== Components ===
==== Sector ====
- Montgomery Air Defense Sector

Gunter Air Force Base, Alabama, 8 September 1957 – 15 November 1958

==== Wing ====
- 52d Fighter Wing (Air Defense)

Suffolk County Air Force Base, New York, 1 December 1967 – 30 September 1968

==== Groups ====
- 52d Fighter Group

Suffolk County Air Force Base, New York, 30 September 1968 1966 – 31 December 1969

- 355th Fighter Group

McGhee-Tyson MAP, Tennessee, 18 August 1955 1966 – 1 March 1956

- 516th Air Defense Group

McGhee-Tyson MAP, Tennessee, 16 February 1953 1966 – 18 August 1955

==== Interceptor squadron ====
- 27th Fighter-Interceptor Squadron

Loring Air Force Base, Maine, 15 September 1966 – 19 November 1969

==== Missile squadrons ====
- 26th Air Defense Missile Squadron (BOMARC)

Otis Air Force Base, Massachusetts, 1 April 1966 1966 – 19 November 1969

- 35th Air Defense Missile Squadron (BOMARC)

Niagara Falls Air Force Missile Site, New York, 15 September 1966 – 19 November 1969

- 46th Air Defense Missile Squadron (BOMARC)

McGuire Air Force Base, New Jersey, 1 December 1967 1966 – 1 October 1972

==== Radar squadrons ====
- 609th Aircraft Control and Warning Squadron

Eufaula Air Force Station, Alabama, 1 September 1957 1966 – 15 November 1958

- 614th Aircraft Control and Warning Squadron

Dobbins Air Force Base, Georgia, 24 December 1953 1966 – 1 July 1956

- 627th Aircraft Control and Warning Squadron

Crystal Springs Air Force Station, Mississippi, 1 September 1957 1966 – 15 November 1958

- 632d Aircraft Control and Warning Squadron

Roanoke Rapids Air Force Station, North Carolina, 20 May 1953 1966 – 1 March 1956

- 648th Radar Squadron

Benton Air Force Station, Pennsylvania, 1 April 1966 1966 – 19 November 1969

- 655th Radar Squadron

Watertown Air Force Station, New York, 1 April 1966 1966 – 19 November 1969

- 656th Radar Squadron

Saratoga Springs Air Force Station, New York, 1 April 1966 1966 – 19 November 1969

- 657th Aircraft Control and Warning Squadron

Houma Air Force Station, Louisiana, 10 April 1955 1966 – 15 November 1958

- 660th Aircraft Control and Warning Squadron

MacDill Air Force Base, Florida, 18 June 1953 1966 – 15 November 1958

- 663d Aircraft Control and Warning Squadron

Lake City Air Force Station, Tennessee, 5 August 1952 1966 – 1 March 1956

- 678th Aircraft Warning and Control Squadron

Tyndall Air Force Base, Florida, 1 February 1956 1966 – 1 April 1957

- 679th Aircraft Control and Warning Squadron

Jacksonville Naval Air Station, Florida, 24 December 1953 1966 – 15 November 1958

- 680th Radar Squadron

Palermo Air Force Station, New Jersey, 1 December 1967 1966 – 1 April 1968

- 691st Aircraft Control and Warning Squadron

Cross City Air Force Station, Florida, 1 December 1957 1966 – 15 November 1958

- 693d Aircraft Control and Warning Squadron

Dauphin Island Air Force Station, Alabama, 1 April 1966 – 15 November 1958

- 698th Aircraft Control and Warning Squadron

Thomasville Air Force Station, Alabama, 1 December 1957 1966 – 15 November 1958

- 701st Aircraft Control and Warning Squadron

Fort Fisher Air Force Station, North Carolina, 1 December 1953 1966 – 1 March 1956

- 702d Aircraft Control and Warning Squadron

Hunter Air Force Base, Georgia, 1 December 1953 1966 – 15 November 1958

- 762d Radar Squadron

North Truro Air Force Station, Massachusetts, 1 April 1966 1966 – 19 November 1969

- 763d Radar Squadron

Lockport Air Force Station, New York, 15 September 1966 – 19 November 1969

- 764th Radar Squadron

Saint Albans Air Force Station, Vermont, 1 April 1966 1966 – 19 November 1969

- 765th Radar Squadron

Charleston Air Force Station, Maine, 15 September 1966 – 19 November 1969

- 766th Radar Squadron

Caswell Air Force Station, Maine, 15 September 1966 – 19 November 1969

- 772d Radar Squadron

Gibbsboro Air Force Station, New Jersey, 1 December 1967 1966 – 19 November 1969

- 773d Radar Squadron

Montauk Air Force Station, New York, 1 December 1967 1966 – 19 November 1969

- 783d Aircraft Control and Warning Squadron

Guthrie Air Force Station, West Virginia, 1 September 1966 – 15 November 1958

- 784th Aircraft Control and Warning Squadron

Snow Mountain Air Force Station, Kentucky, 1 September 1966 – 15 November 1958

- 792d Aircraft Control and Warning Squadron

North Charleston Air Force Station, South Carolina, 24 December 1953 1966 – 15 November 1958

- 799th Aircraft Control and Warning Squadron

Joelton Air Force Station, Tennessee, 1 September 1958 1966 – 1 June 1961

- 810th Aircraft Control and Warning Squadron

Winston-Salem Air Force Station, North Carolina, 1 September 1966 – 15 November 1958

- 861st Aircraft Warning and Control Squadron

Aiken Air Force Station, South Carolina, 8 April 1955 1966 – 15 November 1958

- 867th Aircraft Control and Warning Squadron

Flintstone Air Force Station, Georgia, 1 October 1955 1966 – 1 March 1956; 15 November 1958 1966 – 25 July 1960

- 907th Aircraft Control and Warning Squadron

Bucks Harbor Air Force Station, Maine, 15 September 1966 – 19 November 1969

- 908th Aircraft Control and Warning Squadron

Marietta Air Force Station, Georgia, 25 September 1954 1966 – 15 November 1958

== See also ==
- List of United States Air Force Aerospace Defense Command Interceptor Squadrons
- List of United States Air Force air divisions
- United States general surveillance radar stations
