= Sault Sainte Marie Air Defense Sector =

Sault Sainte Marie Air Defense Sector

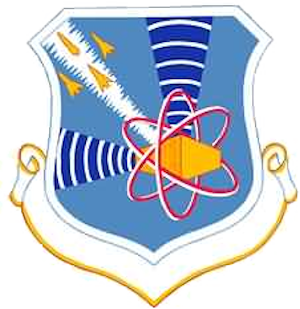
- Emblem of the Sault Sainte Marie Air Defense Sector
- Active: 1958–1966
- Country: United States
- Branch: United States Air Force
- Role: Air Defense
- Part of: Air Defense Command

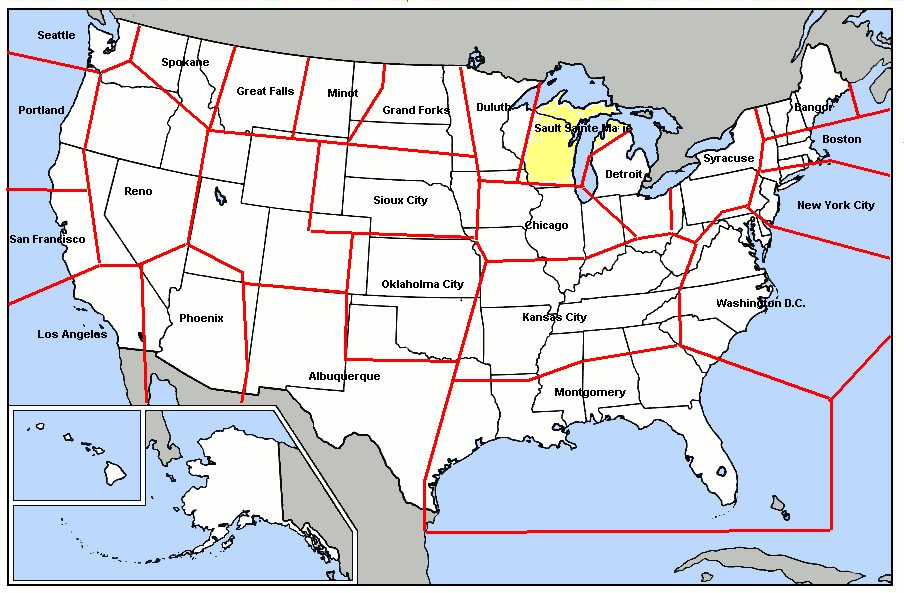
Map of Sault Sainte Marie ADS

The Sault Sainte Marie Air Defense Sector (SsmADS) is an inactive United States Air Force organization. Its last assignment was with the 30th Air Division, being stationed at K.I. Sawyer Air Force Base, Michigan.

== History ==
SsmADS was established in November 1958 assuming control of former ADC Central Air Defense Force units in Wisconsin and the Upper Peninsula of Michigan. The organization provided command and control over several aircraft and radar squadrons.

On 15 June 1960, the new Semi Automatic Ground Environment (SAGE) Direction Center (DC-14) became operational. 46°20′47″N 087°23′00″W DC-14 was equipped with dual AN/FSQ-7 Computers. The day-to-day operations of the command was to train and maintain tactical flying units flying jet interceptor aircraft (F-94 Starfire; F-102 Delta Dagger; F-106 Delta Dart) in a state of readiness with training missions and series of exercises with SAC and other units simulating interceptions of incoming enemy aircraft.

The Sector was inactivated on 1 April 1966 as part of an ADC consolidation and reorganization; and its units were reassigned to the 28th and 29th Air Divisions.

=== Lineage ===
- Established as Sault Sainte Marie Air Defense Sector on 8 November 1958

Inactivated on 15 December 1963

=== Assignments ===
- 37th Air Division, 8 November 1958
- 30th Air Division, 1 April 1959 – 15 December 1963

=== Stations ===
- K.I. Sawyer Air Force Base, Michigan, 8 November 1958 – 15 December 1963

=== Components ===
==== Wings ====
- 56th Fighter Wing (Air Defense)

K. I. Sawyer AFB, Michigan, 1 February 1961 – 1 October 1963

- 507th Fighter Wing (Air Defense)

Kincheloe AFB, Michigan, 1 February 1961 – 1 October 1963

==== Groups ====
- 56th Fighter Group (Air Defense)

K. I. Sawyer AFB, Michigan, 1 April 1960 – 1 February 1961

- 507th Fighter Group (Air Defense)

Kincheloe AFB, Michigan, 1 April 1960 – 1 February 1961

==== Interceptor squadron ====
- 445th Fighter-Interceptor Squadron

Wurtsmith AFB, Michigan, 1 April 1960 – 15 July 1963

==== Missile squadron ====
- 37th Air Defense Missile Squadron (BOMARC)

Kincheloe AFB, Michigan, 1 April 1960 – 1 October 1963

==== Radar squadrons ====
- 639th Aircraft Control and Warning Squadron

Lowther AS, Ontario, 1 April 1960 – 1 July 1963

- 665th Radar Squadron

Calumet AFS, Michigan, 1 April 1960 – 1 October 1963

- 676th Radar Squadron

Antigo AFS, Wisconsin, 1 April 1960 – 1 October 1963

- 752d Radar Squadron

Empire AFS, Michigan, 1 April 1960 – 15 July 1963

- 753d Radar Squadron

Sault Sainte Marie AFS, Michigan, 1 April 1960 – 1 October 1963

- 912th Aircraft Control and Warning Squadron

Ramore AS, Ontario, 1 April 1960 – 1 January 1962

- 913th Aircraft Control and Warning Squadron

Pagwa AS, Ontario, 1 April 1960 – 1 June 1963

== See also ==
- List of USAF Aerospace Defense Command General Surveillance Radar Stations
- Aerospace Defense Command Fighter Squadrons

External image
- SAGE facilities
