= Cross City Airport =

Airport in Florida, United States of America

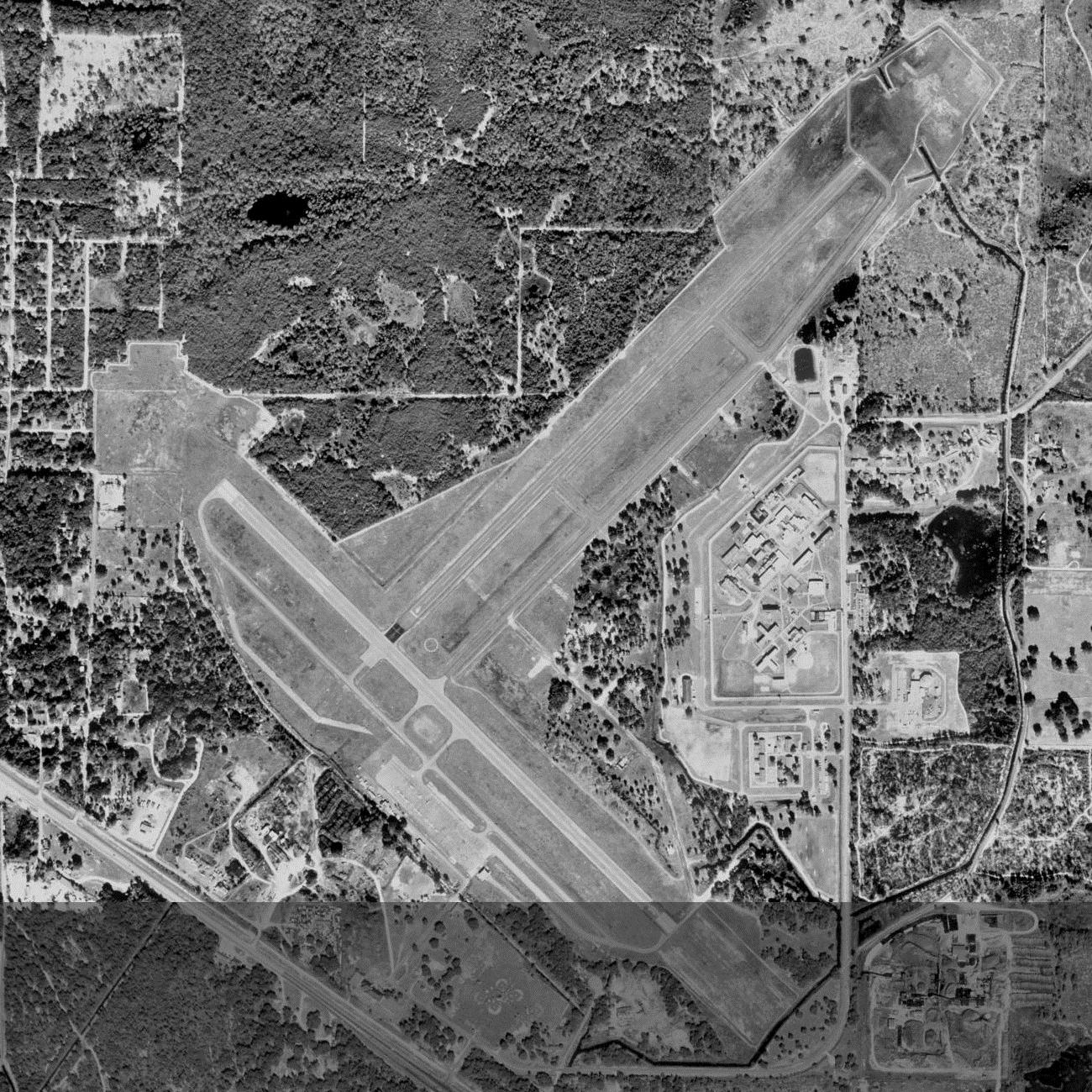
- USGS 1999 orthophoto
- IATA: CTY; ICAO: KCTY; FAA LID: CTY; WMO: 72212

Summary
- Airport type: Public
- Owner: Dixie County
- Serves: Cross City, Florida
- Elevation AMSL: 42 ft (13 m)
- Coordinates: 29°38′08″N 083°06′17″W

Map
- Location of airport in Florida CTY (the United States)

Runways
Direction	Length		Surface
Direction	ft	m	Surface
4/22	5,005	1,526	Asphalt
13/31	5,001	1,524	Asphalt

Statistics (2018)
- Aircraft operations (year ending 4/5/2018): 18,000
- Based aircraft: 11
- Source: Federal Aviation Administration

Cross City Airport (IATA: CTY, ICAO: KCTY, FAA LID: CTY) is a county-owned, public-use airport located in unincorporated Dixie County, Florida, United States, 1 nautical mile (1.9 km) east of the central business district of Cross City. It is included in the National Plan of Integrated Airport Systems for 2011–2015, which categorized it as a general aviation facility.

== History ==
The airport was opened as a public airfield in April 1940. In August 1942, the facility was requisitioned by the United States Army Air Forces as a World War II military airfield, and was named Cross City Army Airfield. The airfield was assigned as a training base to the Army Air Forces School of Applied Tactics (AAFSAT), 50th Fighter Group, headquartered at Orlando Army Air Base, Florida.

After the war, the airfield was returned to civil control. However, in the 1950s, the United States Air Force re-established a radar facility on the airport under the operational control of the 891st Radar Squadron of the Air Defense Command (ADC), later renamed the Aerospace Defense Command. This facility remained at Cross City Air Force Station and was part of the ADC's 20th Air Division from 1959 to 1969 when the facility was closed and transferred back to civilian control. In 1972, the Florida Department of Corrections commenced converting the former Cross City Air Force Station to a prison for adult male offenders known as the Cross City Correctional Institution.

== Facilities and aircraft ==
Cross City Airport covers an area of 591 acres (239 ha) at an elevation of 42 feet (13 m) above mean sea level. It has two asphalt paved runways: 4/22 is 5,005 by 75 feet (1,526 x 23 m) and 13/31 is 5,001 by 100 feet (1,524 x 30 m).

For the 12-month period ending April 5, 2018, the airport had 18,000 general aviation aircraft operations, an average of 49 per day. At that time there were 11 aircraft based at this airport: 7 single-engine, 1 multi-engine, 2 jet, and 1 helicopter.

== See also ==
- List of airports in Florida
