= 482nd Fighter-Interceptor Squadron =

482d Fighter-Interceptor Squadron
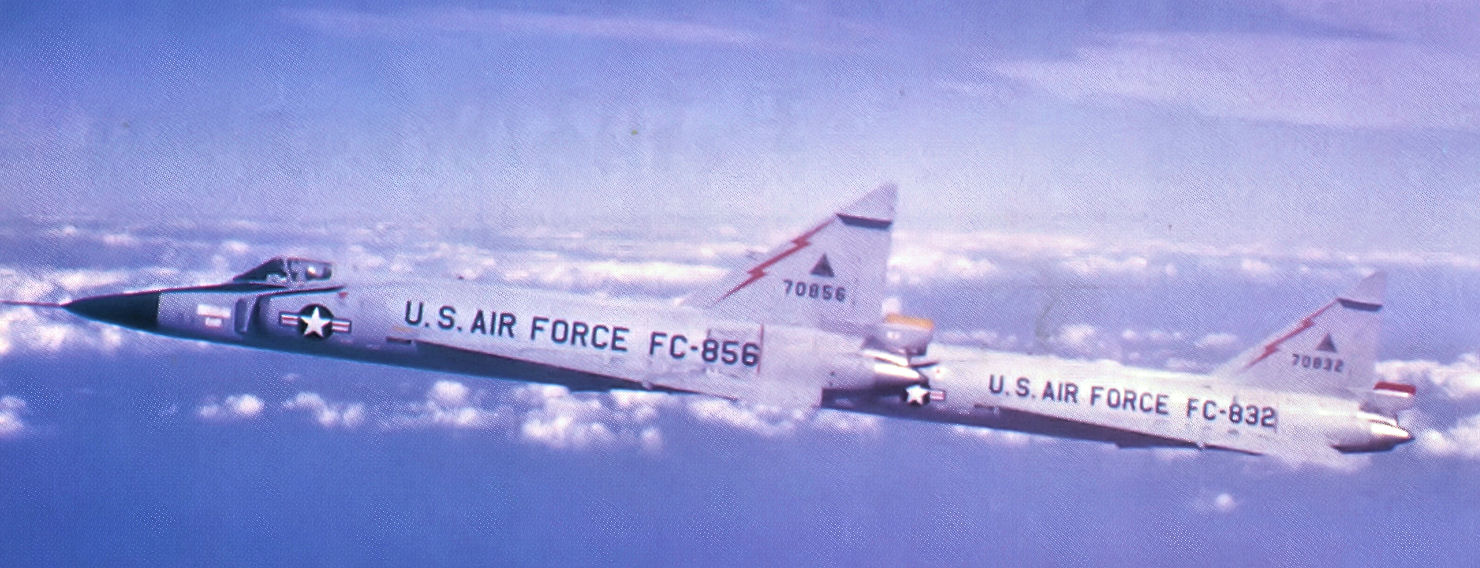
- 482d F-102 Delta Daggers over Seymour Johnson AFB, about 1960 (Note: Aircraft are Convair F-102A-95-CO Delta Dagger 57-856 (transferred to the Air National Guard, sent to the Military Aircraft Storage and Disposition Center in January 1975, converted to QF-102A target drone on 15 October 1976, shot down over White Sands Missile Range in a missile test) and Convair F-102A-90-CO Delta Dagger 57-832 (transferred to the Air National Guard, sent to the Military Aircraft Storage and Disposition Center on 19 March 1975, converted to QF-102A target drone in August 1989). Dirkx, Marco (21 June 2024). "1957 USAF Serial Numbers". Joe Baugher’s Serial Number List.)
- Active: 1943–1944; 1956-1965
- Country: United States
- Branch: United States Air Force
- Type: Fighter interceptor
- Role: Air defense
- Motto: Non Arripient Viam (Latin for 'They Shall Not Pass (literally: They Shall Not Seize the Way')

Insignia
- 482d Fighter-Interceptor Squadron emblem (Note: Approved 3 July 1957. Description: Over a gray equilateral triangle, one point up, bordered black, a stylized silhouetted bird in upward flight, of the last [color mentioned], details of the first [color mentioned], eye red, carrying a weapon red, details black, from the nose of the weapon, two lightning flashes red.)

The 482d Fighter-Interceptor Squadron is an inactive United States Air Force unit. Its last assignment was with Montgomery Air Defense Sector at Homestead Air Force Base, Florida in 1969. During World War II the squadron was a Replacement Training Unit until disbanded in 1944 when the Army Air Forces converted training units to Army Air Force Base Units. It was reconstituted in 1955 and served as a fighter interceptor squadron until 1969.

== History ==
=== World War II ===
Activated in 1943 as a IV Fighter Command P-38 Lightning Replacement Training Unit. The squadron trained P-38 pilots until March 1944 when it was disbanded as part of the switchover of numbered training units in the Zone of the Interior (Continental United States) were replaced by Army Air Force Base Units. At Grand Central Air Terminal, its parent 473d Fighter Group was replaced by the 402d Army Air Force Base Unit (Replacement Training Unit, Fighter), the personnel and equipment of the 482d Fighter Squadron being designated as "Squadron A".

=== Cold War ===
The squadron was redesignated 482d Fighter-Interceptor Squadron in 1955 and reactivated as an Air Defense Command (ADC) interceptor squadron. It performed the air defense mission over the Mid-Atlantic states with Convair F-102 Delta Daggers.

In April 1961, ADC initiated Operation Southern Tip, deploying six F-102 aircraft from its test and training unit at Tyndall Air Force Base Florida to Homestead Air Force Base, Florida in a two-week test of a contingency plan to augment air defense forces in Southern Florida in face of the potential threat from an unfriendly Cuba. Two of the F-102s were maintained on armed five-minute alert status. However, on 17 April the Bay of Pigs Invasion occurred, and the Joint Chiefs of Staff directed that Southern Tip continue indefinitely. However, the impact of the extended deployment on the training and testing mission led to the 482d assuming the mission in July with four of its aircraft. Due to repairs of the Homestead runway, these aircraft were based at Miami International Airport until January 1962. This commitment was expanded to 18 aircraft on 20 October 1962 during the 1962 Cuban Missile Crisis. As the crisis abated in November, the Homestead defense mission was assumed by the 325th Fighter-Interceptor Squadron.

The 482d resumed its Florida defense mission on 15 June 1963, when it deployed six of its F-102s to Naval Air Station Key West to replace Marine F-4B fighters that had deployed there in 1962. The 482d was also tasked to maintain the capability to expand its Key West presence to 20 fighters in the event of another Cuban crisis. This capability was tested in 1964 in Exercise Arawak Spear.

== Lineage ==
- Constituted as the 482d Fighter Squadron on 12 October 1943

Activated on 1 November 1943
Disbanded on 31 March 1944

- Reconstituted and redesignated 482d Fighter-Interceptor Squadron in November 1955

Activated on 8 April 1956
Inactivated on 1 October 1965

=== Assignments ===
- 473d Fighter Group, 1 November 1943 – 31 March 1944
- 85th Air Division, 8 April 1956
- 35th Air Division, 1 September 1958
- 32nd Air Division, 15 November 1959
- Washington Air Defense Sector, 1 July 1961
- Montgomery Air Defense Sector, 1 July 1965 – 30 June 1969

=== Stations ===
- Grand Central Air Terminal, California, 1 November 1943
- Moses Lake Army Air Field, Washington, 31 March 1944
- Seymour Johnson Air Force Base, North Carolina, 8 April 1956 (detachment at Homestead Air Force Base, Florida 1 July 1961 - November 1962 (operated from Miami International Airport, Florida, 1 July – 31 December 1961)
- Homestead Air Force Base, Florida, 1 July 1965 – 30 June 1969

=== Aircraft ===
- P-38 Lightning, 1944
- P-39 Airacobra, 1944
- F-102 Delta Dagger, 1957–1965
