= RCAF Station Ramore GATR site =

RCAF Station Ramore GATR Site
- Ramore, Ontario, Canada

Site information
- Controlled by: Royal Canadian Air Force
- Condition: Derelict

Location
- Location of GATR Site
- Coordinates: 48.43109°N 80.48627°W

Site history
- Built: 1961–1963
- Built by: United States Air Force; Royal Canadian Air Force
- In use: 1963–1974

The RCAF Station Ramore GATR Site was a Ground To Air Transmit and Receive (GATR) Site near Ramore, Ontario, Canada. It was built remotely from the nearby RCAF Station Ramore in order to utilise high output transmitters which would otherwise interfere with the RCAF Station Ramore radar. While connected by land-line to the station, and remotely operated, it was maintained by a dedicated on-site team of personnel on a 24/7 rotation.
