= Joelton Air Force Station =

Former USAF radar station

Joelton Air Force Station
- Part of Air Defense Command (ADC)

Site information
- Type: Air Force Station
- Controlled by: United States Air Force

Location
- Location of Joelton AFS, Tennessee
- Coordinates: 36°20′12″N 086°51′40″W

Site history
- Built: 1956
- In use: 1956-1960

Garrison information
- Garrison: 799th Aircraft Control and Warning Squadron

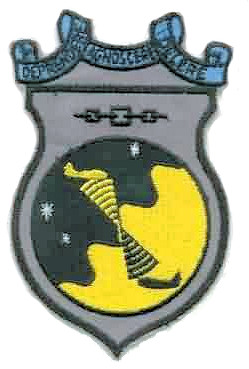
Emblem of the 799th Aircraft Control and Warning Squadron

Joelton Air Force Station (ADC ID: SM-145) is a closed United States Air Force General Surveillance Radar station. It is located 8.3 miles (13.4 km) west of Goodlettsville, Tennessee. It was closed in 1960.

== History ==
Joelton Air Force Station (AFS) was initially part of Phase II of the Air Defense Command Mobile Radar program. The Air Force approved this expansion of the Mobile Radar program on 23 October 1952 to provide radar coverage of the Nashville, TN area. Radars in this network were designated "SM."

The station became operational on 1 October 1956 when the 799th Aircraft Control and Warning Squadron began operating an AN/MPS-11 search radar and an AN/TPS-10D height-finder radar. Eventually these sets were replaced by more-modern AN/FPS-6 height-finder radar and AN/FPS-8 search radar sets. Initially the station functioned as a Ground-Control Intercept (GCI) and warning station. As a GCI station, the squadron's role was to guide interceptor aircraft toward unidentified intruders picked up on the unit's radar scopes.

In addition to the main facility, Guthrie operated an unmanned AN/FPS-18 Gap Filler site:

- Bradyville, TN (SM-145A) 35°42′11″N 086°12′30″W

Joelton AFS was closed on 1 June 1961 due to budgetary constraints. However, the FAA retained the radar, replacing the search radar with an ARSR-1E model. The FAA continues to operate the site as part of the Joint Surveillance System (JSS). Most of the Air Force buildings remain and are in use; the housing area is now private residences.

== Air Force units and assignments ==
=== Units ===
- Constituted as the 799th Aircraft Control and Warning Squadron

Activated at Wright-Patterson AFB (SM-170), OH on 8 February 1956
Moved to Joelton AFS on 1 October 1956
Discontinued and inactivated on 1 June 1961

=== Assignments ===
- 58th Air Division, 1 October 1956
- 35th Air Division, 1 September 1958
- 32d Air Division, 15 November 1958 – 1 June 1961

== See also ==
- List of USAF Aerospace Defense Command General Surveillance Radar Stations
- List of United States Air Force aircraft control and warning squadrons
