= Houma Air Force Station =

Closed United States Air Force General Surveillance Radar station

Houma Air Force Station
- Part of Air Defense Command (ADC)

Site information
- Type: Air Force Station
- Controlled by: United States Air Force

Location
- Location of Houma AFS, Louisiana
- Coordinates: 29°33′45″N 090°40′30″W

Site history
- Built: 1955
- In use: 1955-1970

Garrison information
- Garrison: 657th Aircraft Control and Warning Squadron

Houma Air Force Station (ADC ID: M-126 NORAD ID: Z-126) is a closed United States Air Force General Surveillance Radar station. It is located 3.5 miles (5.6 km) southeast Houma, Louisiana. It was closed in 1970.

== History ==
Houma Air Force Station was established as part of the planned deployment by Air Defense Command of forty-four Mobile radar stations across the United States to support the permanent Radar network established during the Cold War for air defense of the United States. This deployment had been projected to be operational by mid-1952. Funding, constant site changes, construction, and equipment delivery delayed deployment.

Operational status was achieved in March 1955 after the 657th Aircraft Control and Warning Squadron was moved to the station from Tinker AFB, Oklahoma by the 33d Air Division. The squadron began operations using AN/MPS-14, AN/TPS-1D, and AN/TPS-10D radars, and initially the station functioned as a Ground-Control Intercept (GCI) and warning station. As a GCI station, the squadron's role was to guide interceptor aircraft toward unidentified intruders picked up on the unit's radar scopes. In 1958 an AN/FPS-20 search radar was in operation along with AN/MPS-14 and AN/MPS-7 units. The prototype AN/FPS-28 FD search radar was placed at Houma AFS in late 1959 for field testing. In 1960 an AN/FPS-6 height-finder radar was added.

During 1961 Houma AFS joined the Semi Automatic Ground Environment (SAGE) system, initially feeding data to DC-09 at Gunter AFB, Alabama. After joining, the squadron was re-designated as the 657th Radar Squadron (SAGE) on 1 March 1961. The radar squadron provided information 24/7 the SAGE Direction Center where it was analyzed to determine range, direction altitude speed and whether or not aircraft were friendly or hostile. In 1962 the search radar was upgraded to an AN/FPS-67, and the AN/FPS-6B height-finder radar was upgraded to an AN/FPS-90. On 31 July 1963, the site was redesignated as NORAD ID Z-126.

In addition to the main facility, Houman operated an unmanned Gap Filler site:

- Camp Leroy Johnson, New Orleans, LA (M-196A): 30°01′39″N 090°02′55″W

The AN/FPS-28 was deactivated in May 1965. The AN/FPS-67 search radar was then upgraded to an AN/FPS-67B in 1966. In 1968, the AN/MPS-14 was removed from service, and the AN/FPS-90 was deactivated a year later. The 657th Radar Squadron was inactivated in September 1970.

Today the site is the location of the Terrebonne Vocational School. Many buildings remain in use and are in good repair, along with several radar towers.

== Air Force units and assignments ==
Units:

- 657th Aircraft Control and Warning Squadron, Activated at Fort Williams, Maine on 27 November 1950

Inactivated 18 October 1951
Activated at Tinker AFB, Oklahoma, 18 June 1953
Moved to Houma AFS, Louisiana, 1 March 1955
Redesignated 657th Radar Squadron (SAGE), 1 March 1961
Inactivated 30 September 1970

Assignments:

- 540th Aircraft Control and Warning Group, 27 November 1950 – 18 October 1951
- 33d Air Division, 19 June 1953
- 35th Air Division, 10 April 1955
- 32d Air Division, 15 November 1958
- Montgomery Air Defense Sector, 1 November 1959
- 32d Air Division, 1 April 1966
- 33d Air Division, 14 November 1969
- 20th Air Division, 19 November 1969 – 30 September 1970

== See also ==
- List of USAF Aerospace Defense Command General Surveillance Radar Stations
