= 912th Aircraft Control and Warning Squadron =

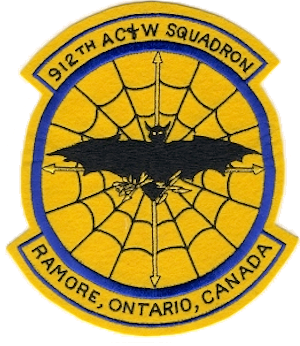
- Emblem of the 912th Aircraft Control and Warning Squadron
- Active: 1952-1962
- Country: United States
- Branch: United States Air Force
- Type: General Radar Surveillance

The 912th Aircraft Control and Warning Squadron is an inactive United States Air Force unit. It was last assigned to the Sault Sainte Marie Air Defense Sector, Air Defense Command, stationed at Ramore Air Station, Ontario, Canada. It was inactivated on 1 January 1962.

The unit was a General Surveillance Radar squadron providing for the air defense of North America.

== Lineage ==
- Established as the 912th Aircraft Control and Warning Squadron

Activated on 10 March 1952
Discontinued 1 January 1962

== Assignments ==
- 32d Air Division, 10 March 1952
- 30th Air Division, 21 December 1952
- 4708th Defense Wing, 16 February 1953
- 30th Air Division, 8 July 1956
- Sault Sainte Marie Air Defense Sector, 1 April 1960 - 1 January 1962

== Stations ==
- Grenier Air Force Base, New Hampshire, 10 March 1952
- Ramore Air Station, Ontario, 21 December 1952 - 1 January 1962
