= 660th Radar Squadron =

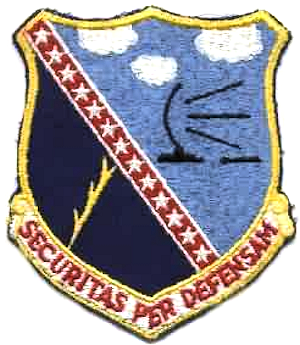
- Emblem of the 660th Radar Squadron
- Active: 1949-1952, 1953-1980
- Country: United States
- Branch: United States Air Force
- Type: General Radar Surveillance

The 660th Radar Squadron is an inactive United States Air Force unit. It was last assigned to the 20th NORAD Region (ADTAC), Tactical Air Command, stationed at MacDill AFB, Florida. It was inactivated on 15 November 1980.

The unit was a General Surveillance Radar squadron providing for the air defense of the United States.

== Lineage ==
- Activated as 660th Aircraft Control and Warning Squadron, 5 December 1949

Inactivated 6 February 1952

- Activated 18 June 1953

Redesignated 660th Radar Squadron (SAGE), 1 March 1961
Redesignated 660th Radar Squadron, 1 February 1974
Inactivated on 15 November 1980

== Assignments ==
- 541st Aircraft Control and Warning Group, 5 December 1949 - 6 February 1952
- 35th Air Division, 18 June 1953
- 32d Air Division, 15 November 1958
- Montgomery Air Defense Sector, 1 November 1959
- 32d Air Division, 1 April 1966
- 20th Air Division, 19 November 1969 - 15 November 1980

== Stations ==
- Selfridge AFB, Michigan, 5 December 1949 - 6 February 1952
- Dobbins AFB, Georgia, 18 June 1953
- MacDill AFB, Florida, 1 August 1954 – 15 November 1980
