= 639th Aircraft Control and Warning Squadron =

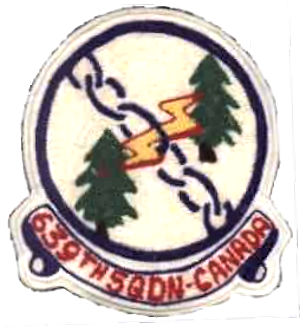
- Emblem of the 639th Aircraft Control and Warning Squadron
- Active: 1952-1963
- Country: United States
- Branch: United States Air Force
- Type: General radar surveillance

The 639th Aircraft Control and Warning Squadron is an inactive United States Air Force unit. It was last assigned to the Sault Sainte Marie Air Defense Sector, Air Defense Command, stationed at Lowther Air Station, Ontario, Canada. It was inactivated on 1 July 1963.

The unit was a general surveillance radar squadron providing for the air defense of North America.

Lineage

- Activated as 639th Aircraft Control and Warning Squadron, 1 December 1956

Inactivated on 1 July 1963

Assignments

- 37th Air Division, 1 December 1956
- 30th Air Division, 1 April 1959
- Sault Sainte Marie Air Defense Sector, 1 April 1960 – 1 July 1963

Stations

- Truax Field, Wisconsin, 1 December 1956
- Lowther Air Station, 1 July 1957 – 1 July 1963
