= 627th Radar Squadron =

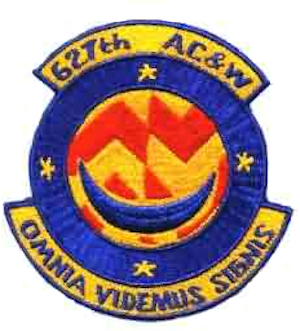
- Emblem of the 627th Radar Squadron
- Active: 1946–1948; 1957-1968
- Country: United States
- Branch: United States Air Force
- Role: Air defense radar surveillance

The 627th Radar Squadron is an inactive United States Air Force unit. It was last assigned to the 32d Air Division, Air Defense Command (ADC), stationed at Crystal Springs Air Force Station, Mississippi. It was inactivated on 8 September 1968.

The squadron was originally activated in 1946 as one of the first Aircraft Control & Warning Squadrons (AC&W Sq) when the Army Air Forces assumed the radar detection mission from the Signal Corps in 1946. Its mission was to provide air defense for the island of Guam. It was inactivated when its parent group moved from Guam to Okinawa.

The unit was reactivated in 1957 as a General Surveillance Radar unit under ADC, providing for the air defense of the Gulf Coast of North America, although it was apparently only a paper unit without personnel or equipment until moving to its programmed site in Mississippi. In 1958, the squadron provided support to contractors participating in the radar frequency diversity test program. In 1959, the squadron joined the Semi Automatic Ground Environment system and was redesignated as a Radar Squadron. It was discontinued and inactivated in 1968, when the Department of Defense decided to draw down air defenses in the Gulf Coast region.

== Lineage ==
- Constituted as the 627th Aircraft Control and Warning Squadron, ca. June 1946

Activated ca 18 July 1946
Inactivated on 22 June 1948
Activated on 8 April 1957
Redesignated 627th Radar Squadron (SAGE) on 1 October 1959
Discontinued and inactivated on 8 September 1968

Assignments

- Probably 529th Aircraft Control and Warning Group, 18 July 1946 – 22 June 1948
- 35th Air Division, 1 September 1957
- 32d Air Division, 15 November 1958
- Montgomery Air Defense Sector, 1 November 1959
- 32d Air Division, 1 April 1966 – 8 September 1968

Stations

- Northwest Guam Air Force Base, Guam, ca 18 July 1946 – 20 March 1948
- Harmon AFB, Guam, 20 March 1948 – 22 June 1948
- Dobbins AFB, Georgia, 8 April 1957 – 1 September 1958
- Crystal Springs AFS, Mississippi, 1 September 1958 – 8 September 1968
