= 702d Radar Squadron =

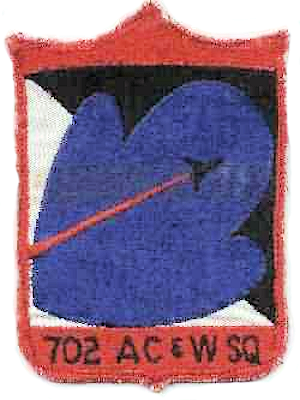
- Emblem of the 702d Radar Squadron
- Active: 1953–1979
- Country: United States
- Branch: United States Air Force
- Type: General Radar Surveillance

The 702d Radar Squadron is an inactive United States Air Force unit. It was last assigned to the 20th Air Division, Aerospace Defense Command, stationed at Savannah Air Force Station, Georgia. It was inactivated on 5 June 1979.

The unit was a General Surveillance Radar squadron providing for the air defense of the United States.

== Lineage ==
- Established as the 702d Aircraft Control and Warning Squadron
- Activated on 1 December 1953
- Redesignated 702d Radar Squadron (SAGE) on 1 February 1962
- Redesignated 702d Radar Squadron on 1 February 1974
- Inactivated on 5 June 1979

== Assignments ==
- 35th Air Division, 1 December 1953
- 32d Air Division, 15 November 1958
- Montgomery Air Defense Sector, 1 July 1961
- 32d Air Division, 1 April 1966
- 33d Air Division, 14 November 1969
- 20th Air Division, 19 November 1969 – 5 June 1979

== Stations ==
- Dobbins AFB, Georgia, 1 December 1953
- Hunter AFB (redesignated: Savannah Air Force Station, Georgia 1 April 1967) 1 March 1955 – 5 June 1979
