= Cross City Air Force Station =

Former United States Air Force facility

Cross City Air Force Station Cross City Army Airfield
- Part of Air Defense Command, later Aerospace Defense Command
- Dixie County, near Cross City, Florida
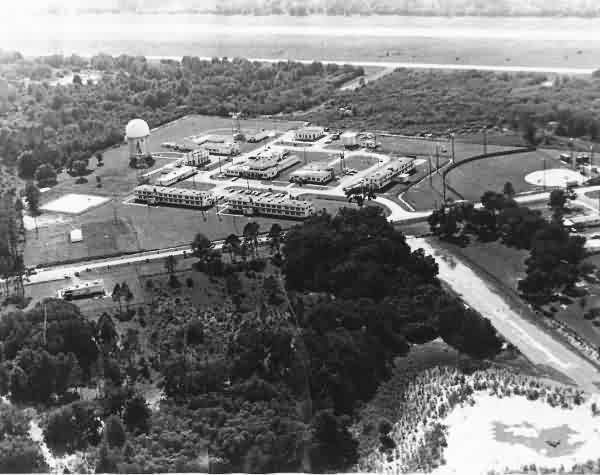
- Cross City AFS in the 1960s

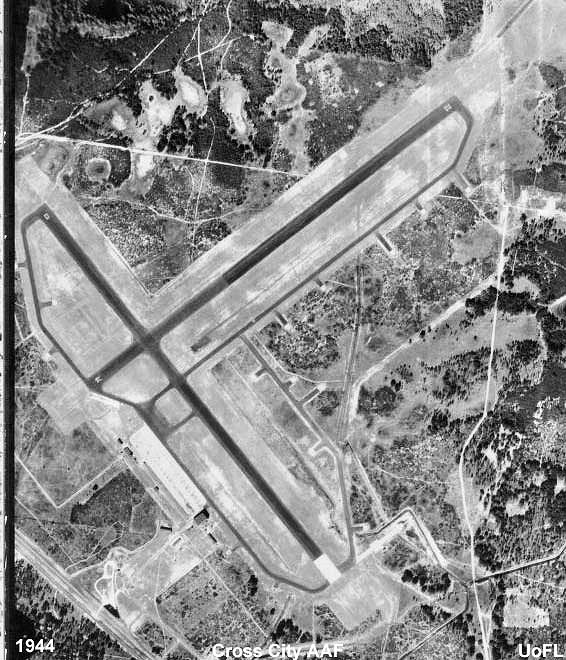
- Cross City Army Airfield, 1944

Site information
- Type: Long Range Radar Site
- Code: ADC ID: TM-200, NORAD ID: Z-200
- Controlled by: United States Air Force
- Open to the public: Yes

Location
- Location within Florida
- Coordinates: 29°38′4.60″N 83°05′55.89″W.

Site history
- Built: 1942
- Built by: U.S. Air Force
- In use: 1942-1970

Garrison information
- Garrison: Cross City, Florida

Cross City Air Force Station is a former United States Air Force facility, located 1.6 miles (2.6 km) east of Cross City, Florida.

== Overview ==
Originally a small civil airport, during World War II it was active as a training base for the Army Air Forces School of Applied Tactics and Third Air Force.

Closed after the war and returned to civil control, in 1958 the United States Air Force exercised a right of return and a portion of the airport became an Air Defense Command ground interceptor radar site. Closed by the Air Force in 1970, the radars were turned over to the Federal Aviation Administration (FAA). Today it is part of the Joint Surveillance System (JSS), designated by NORAD as Eastern Air Defense Sector (EADS) Ground Equipment Facility J-10.

== History ==
=== World War II ===
The airport was opened as a public airport in April 1940. In August 1942, the facility was requisitioned by the United States Army Air Forces, and construction began to convert the Civil Aeronautics Administration airport in Cross City to a dive bomber military training airfield. The construction included the addition of and improvements to buildings, taxiways, roads, and hard stands. Historical documents list three ranges at the Cross City AAF: a shoot-in-butt, a rifle range, and a skeet range.

Known as Cross City Army Airfield, it was used as part of the Army Air Forces Center (AAF Center)'s combat simulation school in Central and Northern Florida and as a unit training center by Third Air Force.

=== Army Air Forces School of Applied Tactics / Army Air Forces Tactical Center ===
Activated on 27 October 1942 as part of the Army Air Forces School of Applied Tactics (AAFSAT), Cross City AAF was assigned as a sub-base of Orlando Army Air Base, and came under the jurisdiction of the 50th Fighter Group stationed at Orlando.

The 50th assigned the 305th Fighter Squadron (Single Engine), flying Bell P-39 Airacobra aircraft, to the field on 21 October 1942 to fly training missions from Cross City. In 1943, the AAFSAT was renamed the Army Air Forces Tactical Center (AAFTC). In June 1943, the 305th Fighter Squadron was replaced by the AAFTC's 81st Fighter Squadron (Single Engine), flying P-47 Thunderbolts until 1 February 1944.

In support of the training mission, the Horseshoe Point Auxiliary Airfield (29°28′19″N 083°18′18″W) was constructed and used by the school as an auxiliary and emergency landing airfield. No personnel were permanently assigned to Horseshoe Point.

=== Third Air Force ===
The AAFTC training mission ended in late June 1944, when Cross City was officially reassigned to III Fighter Command. With the transfer, Cross City was assigned to Third Air Force and became a sub-base of Alachua Army Airfield, near Gainesville, assigned to the Commando Squadron Fighter Training School.

A different mission of sorts was ordered by III Fighter Command, the training of Air Commando fighter units for the China Burma India Theater and the invasion of Burma. Cross City AAF was initially assigned squadrons of the 2d and 3d Air Commando Groups training with North American P-51 Mustang fighters. However, it was decided by Third Air Force to consolidate the Commando fighter squadron training at Alachua AAF. Instead, the liaison squadrons of the 2d Air Commando Group were moved to Cross City AAF from Lakeland Army Airfield in late June. Through the summer and early fall of 1944, six liaison squadrons were trained at the airfield. Equipped with Piper L-4 Grasshopper and Stinson L-5 Sentinel liaison planes and Noorduyn and Aeronca C-64 Norseman utility cargo aircraft, the pilots were schooled in low level flying, short field landings, tactical reconnaissance, and supply missions.

=== Closure ===
With the Air Commando units moving out at the end of 1944, the flying mission wound down at Cross City AAF and it was used as an auxiliary airfield of the Air Technical Service Command facilities at Alachua AAF. The airfield remained open, mostly seeing transient training aircraft from various training bases in Florida and South Georgia. The number of personnel was also reduced, being reassigned to other bases.

In January 1945, Third Air Force sent down orders to close the facility, and it was placed on inactive status on 1 February 1945. Jurisdiction of the airfield was transferred to Air Technical Service Command (ATSC), whose mission was the transfer of any useful military equipment to other bases around the country. Under ATSC, buildings and equipment were sold and any useful military equipment was transferred to other military bases across the United States. The base was declared surplus in 1946 and was turned over to the War Assets Administration (WAA) for disposal and return to civil use. After the war, the airfield was returned to civil control and the Cross City Airport was re-established.

==== World War II units assigned ====
Army Air Forces School of Applied Tactics / Army Air Forces Tactical Center

- 305th Fighter Squadron, 21 October 1942 – 13 June 1943 (P-39 Airacobra)
- 81st Fighter Squadron, 18 June 1943 – 1 February 1944 (P-47 Thunderbolt)

Third Air Force

- 1st Fighter Squadron (Commando), 12–21 June 1944 (P-51 Mustang)
- 2d Fighter Squadron (Commando), 9–21 June 1944 (P-51 Mustang)
- 127th Liaison Squadron (Commando), 21 June-17 August 1944
- 155th Liaison Squadron (Commando), 21 June-17 August 1944
- 156th Liaison Squadron (Commando), 21 June-17 August 1944
- 157th Liaison Squadron (Commando), 19 August-6 October 1944
- 159th Liaison Squadron (Commando), 19 August-6 October 1944
- 160th Liaison Squadron (Commando), 19 August-6 October 1944

=== Air Defense Command / Aerospace Defense Command ===
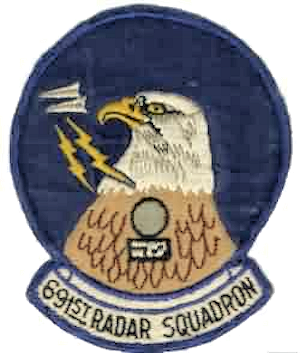
Emblem of the 691st Radar Squadron

In 1958, the United States Air Force exercised a reversal clause option for a portion of the former Cross City AAF under the post-World War II WAA action that transferred the former military airfield back to the city as a civilian airport. As a USAF installation, the new facility would not have a flying mission, but would be an air defense radar site under the operational control of the Air Defense Command (ADC). The portion of the field used by ADC was renamed Cross City Air Force Station.

New military construction (MILCON) ensued, to include concrete structures for barracks, dining facilities, operations, administration, maintenance, and backup electrical power, as well as metal and masonry structures for radar antennas and associated systems. The 691st Aircraft Control and Warning Squadron (691 AC&WS) moved from Dobbins AFB, Georgia to Cross City AFS with an AN/FPS-20A search radar and a pair of AN/FPS-6A height-finder radar sets on 1 July 1958 and the station initially functioned as a Ground-Control Intercept (GCI) and warning station. As a GCI station, the squadron's role was to guide interceptor aircraft toward unidentified intruders picked up on the unit's radar scopes. Alert fighter-interceptor aircraft under Cross City AFS control would typically sortie from Tyndall AFB, Florida or from the Florida Air National Guard's alert facility at Imeson Airport in Jacksonville, Florida.

During 1959, Cross City AFS joined the Semi Automatic Ground Environment (SAGE) system, feeding data to Direction Center DC-09 at Gunter AFB, Alabama. After joining, the squadron was re-designated as the 691st Radar Squadron (SAGE) on 1 October 1959. The radar squadron provided information 24/7/365 to the SAGE Direction Center where it was analyzed to determine range, direction altitude speed and whether or not aircraft were friendly or hostile.

In 1962, the search radar was upgraded to an AN/FPS-66 radar, and then to an AN/FPS-66A in 1967. In addition to the general radar surveillance, Cross City AFS supported CIM-10 Bomarc antiaircraft missile testing by the 4751st Air Defense Wing (Missile) and 4751st Air Defense Squadron (Missile) at Eglin AFB Auxiliary Field #9 (Hurlburt Field), Florida.

In addition to the main facility, Cross City AFS also operated two AN/FPS-14 Gap Filler sites:

- Perry, Florida (TM-200A): 30°04′42″N 083°34′47″W
- Bridgeboro, Georgia (TM-200B/TM-199B): 31°25′28″N 083°57′12″W

On 1 April 1966, the Montgomery Air Defense Sector was replaced by the 32d Air Division, which was reactivated at Gunter AFB on that date. In 1968, Air Defense Command was renamed Aerospace Defense Command (ADC), but all existing command relationships for the 691st Radar Squadron and Cross City AFS with the 32nd Air Division remained unchanged. In 1969, one AN/FPS-6 was removed and higher headquarters for the 691st and Cross City AFS shifted to the 20th Air Division at Tyndall AFB.

The Air Force inactivated the 691st Radar Squadron on 30 September 1970 and closed the facility.

Today what was Cross City Air Force Station is now the Florida Department of Corrections' Cross City Correctional Institution. Access by the general public is not permitted. Many former Air Force buildings are now utilized by the prison while the radar site is still used as part of the Joint Surveillance System (JSS).

==== Post-War Air Force units and assignments ====
Units:

- 691st Aircraft Control and Warning Squadron, assigned 1 July 1958

Activated 1 March 1958 at Dobbins AFB, Georgia (not equipped or manned)
Redesignated 691st Radar Squadron (SAGE), 1 October 1959
Inactivated 30 September 1970

Assignments:

- 35th Air Division, 1 December 1957
- 32d Air Division, 15 November 1958
- Montgomery Air Defense Sector, 1 November 1959
- 32d Air Division, 1 April 1966
- 20th Air Division, 19 November 1969 – 30 September 1970

== See also ==
- Florida World War II Army Airfields
- Army Air Force School of Applied Tactics
- List of USAF Aerospace Defense Command General Surveillance Radar Stations
