= Lake City Air Force Station =

Closed United States Air Force General Surveillance Radar station

Lake City Air Force Station
- Part of Air Defense Command (ADC)

Site information
- Type: Air Force Station
- Controlled by: United States Air Force

Location
- Location of Lake City AFS, Tennessee
- Coordinates: 36°11′54″N 084°13′50″W

Site history
- Built: 1952
- In use: 1952–1960

Garrison information
- Garrison: 663d Aircraft Control and Warning Squadron

Lake City Air Force Station (ADC ID: P-42) is a closed United States Air Force General Surveillance Radar station. It is located 4.4 miles (7.1 km) west-southwest of Lake City, Tennessee. It was closed in 1960.

== History ==
Originally designed as Cross Mountain Air Force Station, Lake City AFS was one of twenty-eight stations built as part of the second segment of the permanent Air Defense Command network. Prompted by the start of the Korean War, on 11 July 1950, the Secretary of the Air Force asked the Secretary of Defense for approval to expedite construction of the second segment of the permanent network. Receiving the Defense Secretary's approval on 21 July, the Air Force directed the Corps of Engineers to proceed with construction.

The 663d Aircraft Control and Warning Squadron began operations at a temporary "Lashup" site L-47 located at McGhee Tyson Airport, near Knoxville, TN on 1 January 1951. It later moved to a Tennessee National Guard Armory in nearby Maryville, Tennessee in November 1951.

With construction at Cross Mountain AFS finishing in March 1952, the 663d AC&W Squadron began operating a pair of AN/CPS-6B and AN/FPS-10 radars from the permanent site, allowing for the deactivation of L-47 at Maryville. The station functioned as a Ground-Control Intercept (GCI) and warning station. As a GCI station, the squadron's role was to guide interceptor aircraft toward unidentified intruders picked up on the unit's radar scopes. The station was re-designated as Lake City AFS, TN, on 1 December 1953. An AN/FPS-6 height-finder radar was added in 1958. One AN/FPS-10 was removed in 1959.

In addition to the main facility, Lake City operated three unmanned AN/FPS-18 Gap Filler sites:

- Aquone, NC (P-42A) 35°10′39″N 083°33′49″W, now a parking/hiking base for Wayah Bald
- London, KY (P-42B) 37°09′03″N 083°59′32″W
- Melvin Hill, NC (P-42C) 35°12′27″N 081°59′21″W

This site ceased operations on 1 June 1961 due to budget constraints. Today the site is the location for the WCYQ & WDVX radio transmitters and several towers including a Television station.

== Air Force units and assignments ==
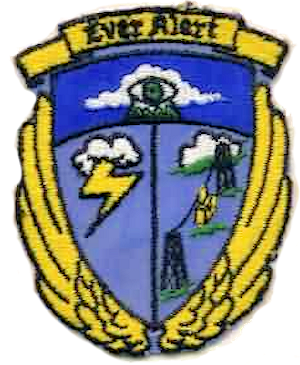
Emblem of the 663d Aircraft Control and Warning Squadron

Units:

- 663d Aircraft Control and Warning Squadron, Assigned 6 February 1952

Activated by 30th AD at Willow Run AFS (P-23), MI, 1 January 1950 (Not manned or equipped)
Assigned to McGhee-Tyson Airport, TN, 1 January 1951

Discontinued on 1 June 1961

Assignments:

- 541st Aircraft Control and Warning Group (30th Air Division), 1 January 1951

Transferred to 30th Air Division, 6 February 1952

- 35th Air Division, 5 August 1952
- 58th Air Division, 1 March 1956
- 32d Air Division, 15 November 1958 – 1 June 1961

== See also ==
- United States general surveillance radar stations
