= Eufaula Air Force Station =

Closed United States Air Force radar station

Eufaula Air Force Station
- Part of Air Defense Command (ADC)
- West of Eufaula, Alabama
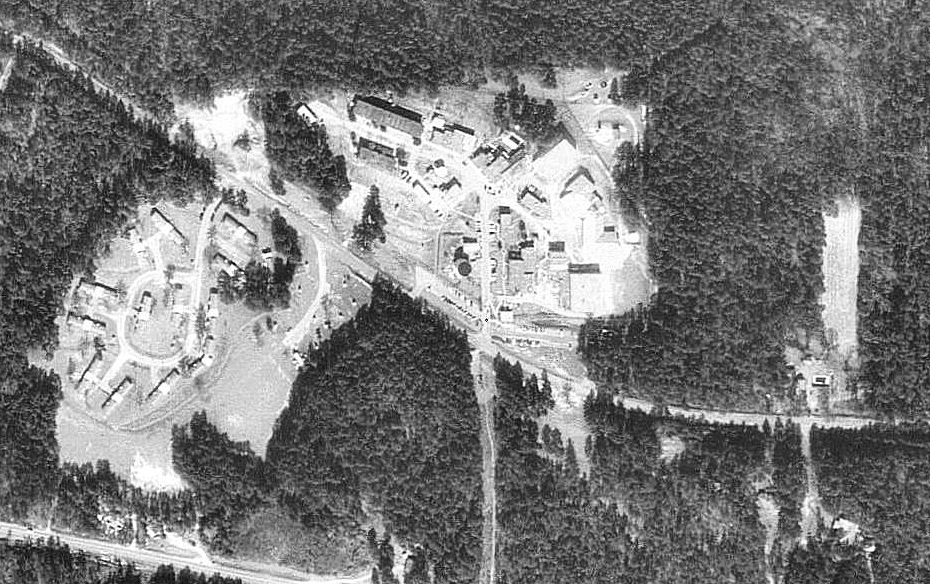
- Eufaula Air Force Station - 21 Jan 1992

Site information
- Type: Air Force Station
- Code: ADC ID: TM-199, NORAD ID: Z-199
- Controlled by: United States Air Force

Location
- Location within Alabama
- Coordinates: 31°52′53″N 085°15′13″W

Site history
- Built: 1958
- In use: 1958–1968

Garrison information
- Garrison: 609th Aircraft Control and Warning Squadron

Eufaula Air Force Station is a closed United States Air Force General Surveillance Radar station. It is located 6.4 miles (10.3 km) west of Eufaula, Alabama. It was closed in 1968.

== History ==
Eufaula Air Force Station came into existence as part of Phase III of the Air Defense Command Mobile Radar program. On 20 October 1953 ADC requested a third phase of twenty-five radar sites be constructed.

The 609th Aircraft Control and Warning Squadron was assigned on 1 September 1958. A test model of the AN/FPS-24 search radar and a test model of the AN/FPS-26 height-finder radar were installed for evaluation in early 1959. An AN/FPS-90 height-finder radar was also installed, and initially the station functioned as a Ground-Control Intercept (GCI) and warning station. As a GCI base, the squadron's role was to guide interceptor aircraft toward unidentified intruders picked up on the unit's radar scopes.

The Ground Air Transmitting Receiving (GATR) Site for communications was located at 31°53′11″N 085°16′25″W, approximately 1.2 miles west-northwest from the main site. Normally the GATR site was connected by a pair of buried telephone cables, with a backup connection of dual telephone cables overhead. The Coordinate Data Transmitting Set (CDTS) (AN/FST-2) at the main site converted each radar return into a digital word which was transmitted by the GATR via microwave to the Control center.

During 1959 the installation became permanent and joined the Semi Automatic Ground Environment (SAGE) system, feeding data to DC-09 at Gunter AFB, Alabama. After joining, the squadron was redesignated as the 609th Radar Squadron (SAGE) on 1 October. The radar squadron provided information 24/7 the SAGE Direction Center where it was analyzed to determine range, direction altitude speed and whether or not aircraft were friendly or hostile. On 31 July 1963, the site was redesignated as NORAD ID Z-199.

In addition to the main facility, Eufaula operated an AN/FPS-14 Gap Filler site: Davenport, AL (TM-199A): 32°00′14″N 086°19′45″W and a second Gap-Filler site at Bridgeboro, Ga. with a AN/FPS 18 Radar set.

The tending 609th Radar Squadron was inactivated on 8 September 1968 following a catastrophic failure of the main bearing of the AN/FPS-24 radar set that damaged the steel tower. The station was closed on 30 September. After its closure, the site was taken over by the local government and the Eufaula Youth Center was established. Today, most of the former Air Force buildings are still in use, along with the radar towers.

In September 2009 the site was sold by the State of Alabama. As of now, six buildings inside of the fence have been torn down.

== Air Force units and assignments ==
Units:

- 609th Aircraft Control and Warning Squadron reactivated at Dobbins AFB (M-87), GA, 1 December 1957

Moved to Eufala AFS 1 September 1958
Redesignated 609th Radar Squadron (SAGE), 1 October 1959
Discontinued and inactivated on 8 September 1968

Assignments:

- 35th Air Division, 1 September 1958
- 32d Air Division, 15 November 1958
- Montgomery Air Defense Sector, 1 November 1959
- 32d Air Division, 1 April 1966 – 8 September 1968

== See also ==
- List of USAF Aerospace Defense Command General Surveillance Radar Stations
- List of United States Air Force aircraft control and warning squadrons
