= 679th Radar Squadron =

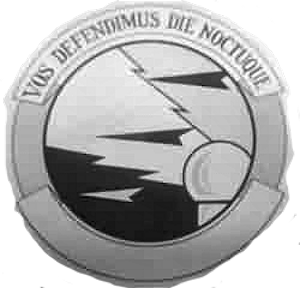
- Emblem of the 679th Radar Squadron
- Active: 1951–1952, 1953-1981
- Country: United States
- Branch: United States Air Force
- Type: General Radar Surveillance

The 679th Radar Squadron is an inactive United States Air Force unit. It was last assigned to the 20th Air Division, Aerospace Defense Command, stationed at Naval Air Station Jacksonville, Florida. It was inactivated on 31 July 1981.

The unit was a General Surveillance Radar squadron providing for the air defense of the United States.

== Lineage ==
- Activated as 679th Aircraft Control and Warning Squadron

Activated on 1 March 1951
Inactivated on 6 February 1952

- Activated on 1 September 1953

Redesignated 679th Radar Squadron (SAGE), 1 October 1962
Redesignated 679th Radar Squadron on 1 February 1974
Inactivated on 31 July 1981

Assignments

- 545th Aircraft Control and Warning Group, 1 March 1951 – 6 February 1952
- 32d Air Division, 1 September 1953
- 35th Air Division, 24 December 1953
- 32d Air Division, 15 November 1958
- Montgomery Air Defense Sector, 1 July 1961
- 32d Air Division, 1 April 1966
- 33d Air Division, 14 November 1969
- 20th Air Division, 19 November 1969 – 31 July 1981

Stations

- Great Falls AFB, MT, 1 March 1951 – 6 February 1952
- Dow AFB, ME, 1 September 1953
- Dobbins AFB, GA, 24 December 1953
- NAS Jacksonville, FL, 1 July 1957 – 31 July 1981
