= Thomasville Air Force Station =

Closed United States Air Force General Surveillance Radar station

Thomasville Air Force Station
- Part of Air Defense Command (ADC)
- Thomasville, Alabama

Site information
- Type: Long Range Radar Site
- Owner: National Park Service
- Controlled by: United States Air Force
- Open to the public: Yes

Location
- Location of Thomasville AFS, Alabama
- Coordinates: 31°56′14″N 087°45′03″W

Site history
- Built: 1959
- Built by: U.S. Air Force
- In use: 1959-1969

Garrison information
- Garrison: Thomasville, Alabama

Thomasville Air Force Station (ADC ID: TM-197, NORAD ID: Z-197) is a closed United States Air Force General Surveillance Radar station. It is located 1.9 miles (3.1 km) north-northwest of Thomasville, Alabama. It was closed in 1969.

== History ==
Thomasville Air Force Station came into existence as part of Phase III of the Air Defense Command Mobile Radar program. On 20 October 1953, ADC requested a third phase of twenty-five radar sites be constructed.

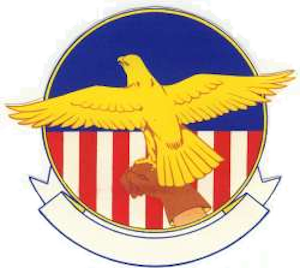
698th Radar Squadron emblem

The 698th Aircraft Control and Warning Squadron moved to Thomasville on 1 September 1958 when a test model of the AN/FPS-35 radar was installed for evaluation. It was the first of the large radars to be deployed, and initially the station functioned as a Ground-Control Intercept (GCI) and warning station. As a GCI station, the squadron's role was to guide interceptor aircraft toward unidentified intruders picked up on the unit's radar scopes. Two AN/FPS-90 height-finder radars were added in the early 1960s.

The Ground Air Transmitting Receiving (GATR) Site for communications was located at 31°56′27″N 087°44′18″W, approximately 0.8 miles east-northeast from the main site. Normally the GATR site was connected by a pair of buried telephone cables, with a backup connection of dual telephone cables overhead. The Coordinate Data Transmitting Set (CDTS) (AN/FST-2) at the main site converted each radar return into a digital word which was transmitted by the GATR via microwave to the Control Center.

In 1959, Thomasville joined the Semi Automatic Ground Environment (SAGE) system, feeding data to DC-09 at Gunter AFB, Alabama. After joining, the squadron was redesignated as the 698th Radar Squadron (SAGE) on 1 October. The radar squadron provided information 24/7 the SAGE Direction Center where it was analyzed to determine range, direction altitude speed and whether or not aircraft were friendly or hostile. On 31 July 1963, the site was redesignated as NORAD ID Z-97.

During the Cuban Missile Crisis, the 9th Aerospace Defense Division implemented an improvised missile warning system directed toward the Cuban missile threat called Falling Leaves. In October 1962, the SPADATS AN/FPS-49 radar at Moorestown Air Force Station, New Jersey was reoriented south and directed toward Cuba. A communication network was established with Moorestown, the AN/FPS-78 radar at Laredo Air Force Base, Texas and Thomasville. All three stations were in turn tied into the command centers at NORAD and at Strategic Air Command. This missile detection network remained in operation until 28 November and the Moorestown and Laredo sites were returned to their normal SPADATS mission when Soviet missiles were withdrawn from Cuba. The Thomasville station, retained coverage until late December as a precaution.

The 698th Radar Squadron was inactivated on 30 September 1969 and Thomasville AFS was closed due to a draw-down of ADC and budget constraints. After its closure, the site was the location of the Thomasville Mental Health & Rehabilitation Center, and Alabama Department of Youth Services. However, the former closed completely by November 2003.

Today the former radar site is used by the Alabama Southern Community College. Many of the former Air Force buildings remain, as well as the large AN/FPS-35 search-radar tower, which dominates the site.

== Air Force units and assignments ==
=== Units ===
- 698th Aircraft Control and Warning Squadron, assigned 1 September 1958

Activated 1 December 1957 at Dobbins AFB, GA (not equipped or manned)
Redesignated 698th Radar Squadron (SAGE) on 1 October 1959
Inactivated 31 December 1969

=== Assignments ===
- 35th Air Division, 1 December 1957
- 32d Air Division, 15 November 1958
- Montgomery Air Defense Sector, 1 November 1959
- 32d Air Division, 1 April 1966 – 31 December 1969

== See also ==
- List of USAF Aerospace Defense Command General Surveillance Radar Stations
