= Snow Mountain Air Force Station =

Radar station in Kentucky, US 1952–1968

Snow Mountain Air Force Station
- Part of Air Defense Command (ADC)

Site information
- Type: Air Force Station
- Controlled by: United States Air Force

Location
- Location of Snow Mountain AFS, Kentucky
- Coordinates: 37°53′50″N 086°00′00″W

Site history
- Built: 1952
- In use: 1952-1968

Garrison information
- Garrison: 784th Aircraft Control and Warning (later Radar) Squadron

Snow Mountain Air Force Station (ADC ID: P-82, NORAD ID: Z-82) is a closed United States Air Force General Surveillance Radar station. It is located 1.9 miles (3.1 km) west-southwest of Godman Army Airfield, Kentucky. It was closed in 1968.

== History ==
Snow Mountain AFS was one of twenty-eight stations built as part of the second segment of the Air Defense Command permanent radar network, primarily to provide air defense radar coverage for Fort Knox. Prompted by the start of the Korean War, on 11 July 1950, the Secretary of the Air Force asked the Secretary of Defense for approval to expedite construction of the permanent network. Receiving the Defense Secretary's approval on 21 July, the Air Force directed the Corps of Engineers to proceed with construction.

On 16 April 1951 the 784th Aircraft Control and Warning Squadron was initially activated at Godman Field, KY (LP-82) on Fort Knox where it operated a World War II-era AN/TPS-1C radar, and initially the station functioned as a Ground-Control Intercept (GCI) and warning station. As a GCI station, the squadron's role was to guide interceptor aircraft toward unidentified intruders picked up on the unit's radar scopes. It was moved to the new Snow Mountain site, also on the Fort Knox Reservation on 30 April 1952. This site became a separate Air Force installation, Snow Mountain Air Force Station in the summer of 1956. At Snow Mountain it began operating AN/FPS-3 and AN/FPS-4 radars at Snow Mountain. In 1958 these radars were replaced by AN/FPS-20 and AN/FPS-6 sets. A second AN/FPS-6 height-finder radar was added in 1961. In 1962 the search radar was upgraded to become an AN/FPS-67.

During 1962 Snow Mountain AFS joined the Semi Automatic Ground Environment (SAGE) system, feeding data to DC-22 at Truax Field, Wisconsin. After joining, the squadron was redesignated as the 784th Radar Squadron (SAGE) on 1 May 1962. The radar squadron provided information 24/7 the SAGE Direction Center where it was analyzed to determine range, direction altitude speed and whether or not aircraft were friendly or hostile. On 31 July 1963, the site was redesignated as NORAD ID Z-82. In 1965 the search radar was again upgraded to become an AN/FPS-67B.

In addition to the main facility, Snow Mountain operated four unmanned AN/FPS-18 Gap Filler sites:

- Odon, IN (P-82A) 38°52′19″N 086°59′46″W
- Kingston, IN (P-82C) 39°22′56″N 085°22′33″W
- Madisonville, KY (P-82D) 37°21′49″N 087°29′49″W
- Owingsville AFS (P-82B) was assigned as a Gep Filler site upon its closure in 1957. It is unclear if it ever was equipped or became operational.

The 784th Radar Squadron was inactivated on 18 June 1968 with the closure of Snow Mountain Air Force Station due to the perceived remote threat of an aircraft attack on Fort Knox.

== Air Force units and assignments ==
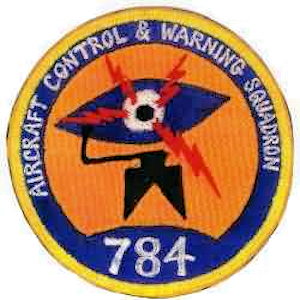
Emblem of the 784th Radar Squadron

=== Units ===
- Constituted as the 784th Aircraft Control and Warning Squadron

Activated at Godman Field (LP-82), Fort Knox, KY on 16 April 1951
Moved to Snow Mountain, Fort Knox, KY on 30 April 1952
Redesignated as 784th Radar Squadron (SAGE) on 1 May 1962
Discontinued and inactivated on 18 June 1968

=== Assignments ===
- 541st Aircraft Control and Warning Group, 16 April 1951
- 30th Air Division, 6 February 1952
- 4706th Defense Wing (later 4706th Air Defense Wing), 16 February 1953
- 58th Air Division, 1 March 1956
- 35th Air Division, 1 September 1958
- 32d Air Division, 15 November 1958
- Chicago Air Defense Sector, 1 June 1961
- Detroit Air Defense Sector, 1 August 1961
- Chicago Air Defense Sector, 25 May 1962
- 34th Air Division, 1 April 1966 – 18 June 1968

== See also ==
- List of USAF Aerospace Defense Command General Surveillance Radar Stations
- List of United States Air Force aircraft control and warning squadrons
