= 614th Radar Squadron =

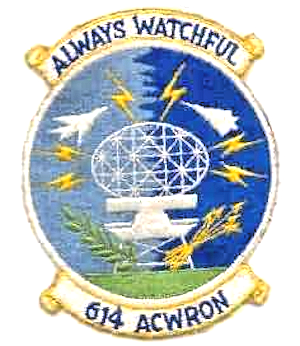
- Emblem of the 614th Radar Squadron
- Active: 1952-1963
- Country: United States
- Branch: United States Air Force
- Type: General Radar Surveillance

The 614th Radar Squadron is an inactive United States Air Force unit. It was last assigned to the Washington Air Defense Sector, Air Defense Command, stationed at Cherry Point Marine Corps Air Station, North Carolina. It was discontinued on 1 August 1963.

The unit was a General Surveillance Radar squadron providing for the air defense of the United States.

Lineage

- Constituted as the 614th Aircraft Control and Warning Squadron, 1946

Activated on or about 1 August 1946

- Redesignated: 614th Radar Squadron (SAGE), 1 March 1963

Discontinued and inactivated on 1 August 1963

Assignments

- 526th Aircraft Control & Warning Group, on or about 1 August 1946
- Pacific Air Command, on or about 1 December 1948
- 1500 Air Base Group, 1 Jun 1949
- Eastern Air Defense Force, 1 July 1952
- 32d Air Division, 1 December 1952
- 4704th Defense Wing, 16 February 1953
- 35th Air Division, 24 December 1953
- 85th Air Division, 1 July 1956
- 35th Air Division, 1 September 1958
- 32d Air Division, 15 November 1958
- Washington Air Defense Sector, 1 July 1961

Stations

- Fort Shafter, Hawaii circa 1 August 1946
- Hickam AFB, Hawaii Territory, 7 February 1949
- Grenier AFB*, New Hampshire, 1 July 1952
- Dobbins AFB*, Georgia, 24 December 1953
- Andrews AFB*, Maryland, 1 July 1956
- Cherry Point Marine Corps Air Station, 1 July 1957 – 1 August 1963

.* Unit not manned or equipped
