= 693d Radar Squadron =

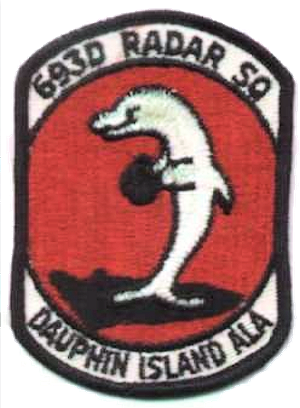
- Emblem of the 693d Radar Squadron
- Active: 1958–1970
- Country: United States
- Branch: United States Air Force
- Type: General Radar Surveillance

The 693d Radar Squadron is an inactive United States Air Force unit. It was last assigned to the 20th Air Division, Aerospace Defense Command, stationed at Dauphin Island Air Force Station, Alabama. It was inactivated on 30 September 1970.

The unit was a General Surveillance Radar squadron providing for the air defense of the United States.

== Lineage ==
- Established as 693d Aircraft Control and Warning Squadron

Activated on 1 April 1958
Redesignated as 693d Radar Squadron (SAGE) on 1 March 1961
Inactivated on 30 September 1970

Assignments

- 35th Air Division, 1 April 1958
- 32d Air Division, 15 November 1958
- Montgomery Air Defense Sector, 1 November 1959
- 32d Air Division, 1 April 1966
- 33d Air Division, 14 November 1969
- 20th Air Division, 19 November 1969 – 30 September 1970

Stations

- Dobbins AFB, Georgia, 8 April 1958
- Dauphin Island AFS, Alabama, 1 September 1958 – 30 September 1970
