= Cross City Correctional Institution =

Prison in Cross City, Florida, United States

Coordinates: 29°38′04″N 83°05′56″W

- Interactive map of Cross City Correctional Institution
- Location: 568 NE 255th Street Cross City, Florida
- Status: Operational
- Security class: minimum, medium, and close
- Capacity: 1,734 = 1,022 main + 712 work camp
- Population: 1,575 = 1,031 main + 544 work camp
- Opened: 1972
- Managed by: Florida Department of Corrections
- Warden: Mitchell "Larry" Keen, Jr.

The Cross City Correctional Institution is a state prison for men located in unincorporated Dixie County, Florida, owned and operated by the Florida Department of Corrections. It has a Cross City postal address.

This facility has a mix of security levels, including minimum, medium, and close, and houses adult male prisoners. Cross City first opened in 1972 on the grounds of the decommissioned Cross City Air Force Station, and has a maximum capacity of 1,734 prisoners.
