= CFS Lowther =

Radar station in Ontario, Canada

Canadian Forces Station Lowther
- Opasatika, Ontario, Canada

Site information
- Type: Radar Station
- Code: M-119/C-119
- Controlled by: United States Air Force; Royal Canadian Air Force

Location
- Location of CFS Lowther, Ontario
- Coordinates: 49°33′21″N 082°59′31″W

Site history
- Built: 1957
- Built by: United States Air Force
- In use: 1958-1963,1963-1987

Canadian Forces Station Lowther (ADC ID: M-119/C-119) is a closed General Surveillance Radar station, located 12.7 miles (20.4 km) east-southeast of Mattice-Val Côté, Ontario, Canada. It was closed in 1987.

It was operated as part of the Pinetree Line network controlled by NORAD.

== History ==
As a result of the Cold War and with the expansion of a North American continental air defence system, Lowther was selected as a site for a United States Air Force (USAF) radar station, one of the many that would make up the Pinetree Line of Ground-Control Intercept (GCI) radar sites. The original plan was to build the base in Oba, Ontario, but the location was changed due to Oba's poor road access.

The USAF initially considered Lowther to be part of a planned deployment of forty-four mobile radar stations, to support the permanent ADC network of seventy-five stations around the perimeter of the United States. For that reason the station was initially designated as "M-119". This designation was later changed to reflect its Canadian location and was re-designated as "C-119", in line with the other Ontario Pinetree Line sites being constructed.

In July 1957, the USAF Air Defense Command (ADC) 37th Air Division moved the 639th Aircraft Control and Warning Squadron to the station. Initial radars installed were AN/MPS-7, AN/FPS-4, and AN/MPS-14 sets. Lowther Air Station, as it was referred to by the USAF, was declared operationally ready on 1 July 1958.

In early 1963 the 639th AC&WS was inactivated and preparations were made to transfer the station to the Royal Canadian Air Force. This was part of an arrangement with the United States that came as a result of the cancellation of the Avro Arrow. Canada would obtain 66 F-101B Voodoo fighters from 1961 onwards, and take over operation of 12 Pinetree radar bases.

In March 1963, Lowther AS was connected to the Semi Automatic Ground Environment (SAGE) system and the station became a long-range radar site. It would no longer guide interceptors but only look for enemy aircraft, feeding data to the Sault Sainte Marie Air Defense Sector SAGE DC-14 Data Center of the 30th NORAD Region at K.I. Sawyer AFB, Michigan.

On 1 July 1963, the station was turned over to the RCAF, the final Pinetree Line site to be transferred. Under RCAF jurisdiction, the station was renamed RCAF Station Lowther. The RCAF's operating unit was No. 36 Radar Squadron. It was also upgraded with the following radars:

- Search radars: AN/MPS-7, AN/FPS-27, AN/FPS-27A
- Height radars: AN/MPS-14, AN/FPS-4, AN/FPS-6B, AN/FPS-26A

On 1 April 1966, Lowther began feeding SAGE data to the 29th NORAD Region at Duluth, Minnesota (later re-designated the 23d NORAD Region in November 1969). With the unification of the RCAF, Royal Canadian Navy and Canadian Army into the Canadian Forces, the station was re-designated simply CFS Lowther in 1968.

Beginning in 1983, the station began reporting to Canada East ROCC. In July 1986, plans to decommission CFS Lowther along with 17 other sites were in the works and on 1 April 1987 CFS Lowther was officially decommissioned as part of the shut-down of the Pinetree Line.

== Post closure ==
As part of a process that would take more than two years to complete, the radar station, a ground-air transmitter receiver (GATR) site, and recreational and living facilities would be completely removed and the land returned to its natural state.

By 1988, CFS Lowther had become somewhat forsaken. Though there were still buildings and radar towers present, only three commissionaires remained to guard the once vibrant station. By 1992, everything was gone including the guards. The old gymnasium had been moved into the nearby town of Opasatika, where it was turned into a mushroom growing facility, and the remote radio site was taken over by Hyundai for use as a winter test facility.

As a memorial, an AN/FPS-26 Height Finder antenna was relocated to the main throughway in Kapuskasing. Other than the abandoned roadways, nothing remains of CFS Lowther.

== See also ==
- List of Royal Canadian Air Force stations
- List of USAF Aerospace Defense Command General Surveillance Radar Stations
