= 601st Air Operations Center =

601st Air Operations Center

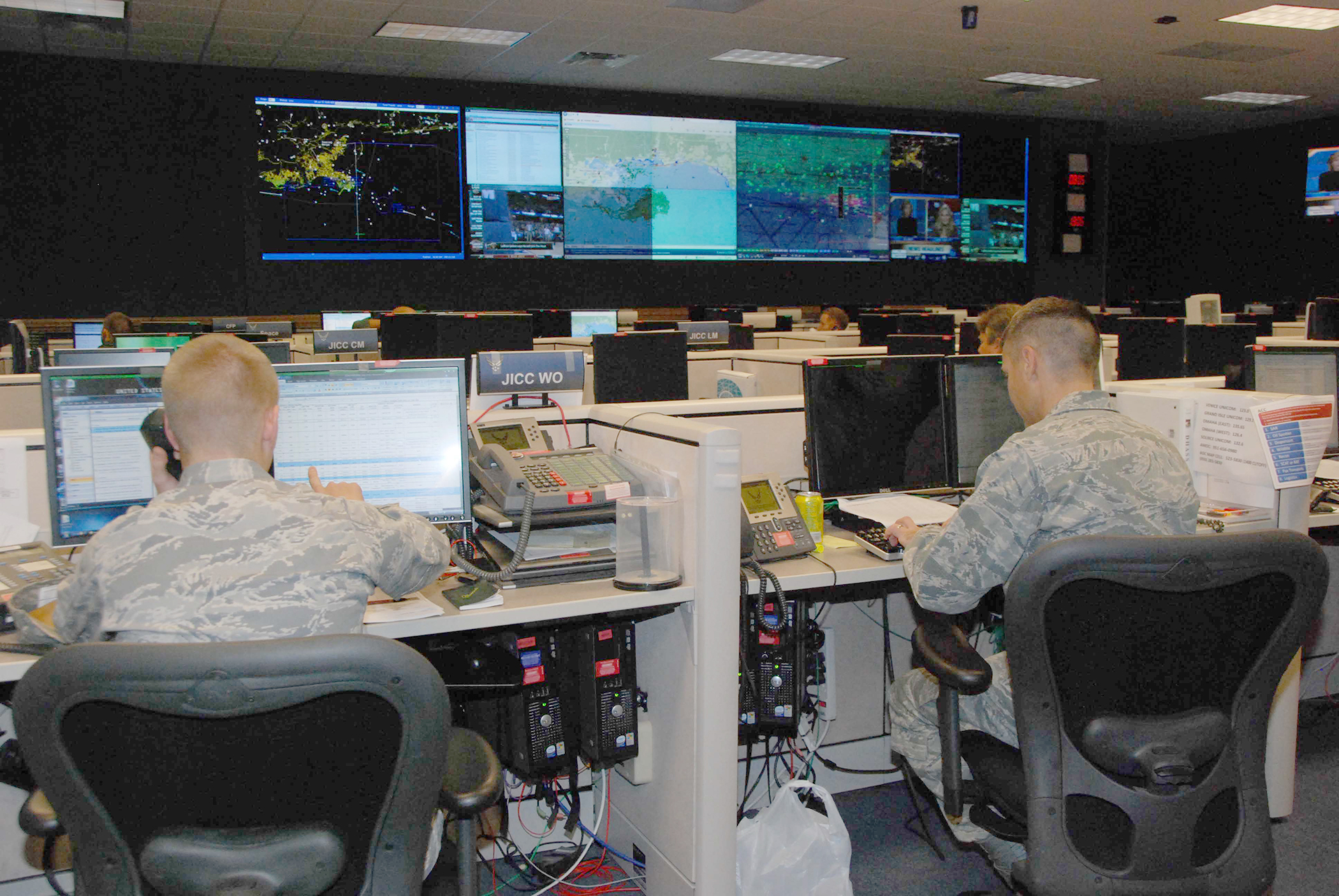
- Airmen coordinate airspace activity at the 601st Air and Space Operations Center, 2010
- Active: 1 November 2007 – present
- Country: United States
- Branch: United States Air Force
- Role: Command and Control
- Part of: Air Combat Command: First Air Force
- Garrison/HQ: Tyndall AFB, Florida
- Nickname: America's AOC

Insignia
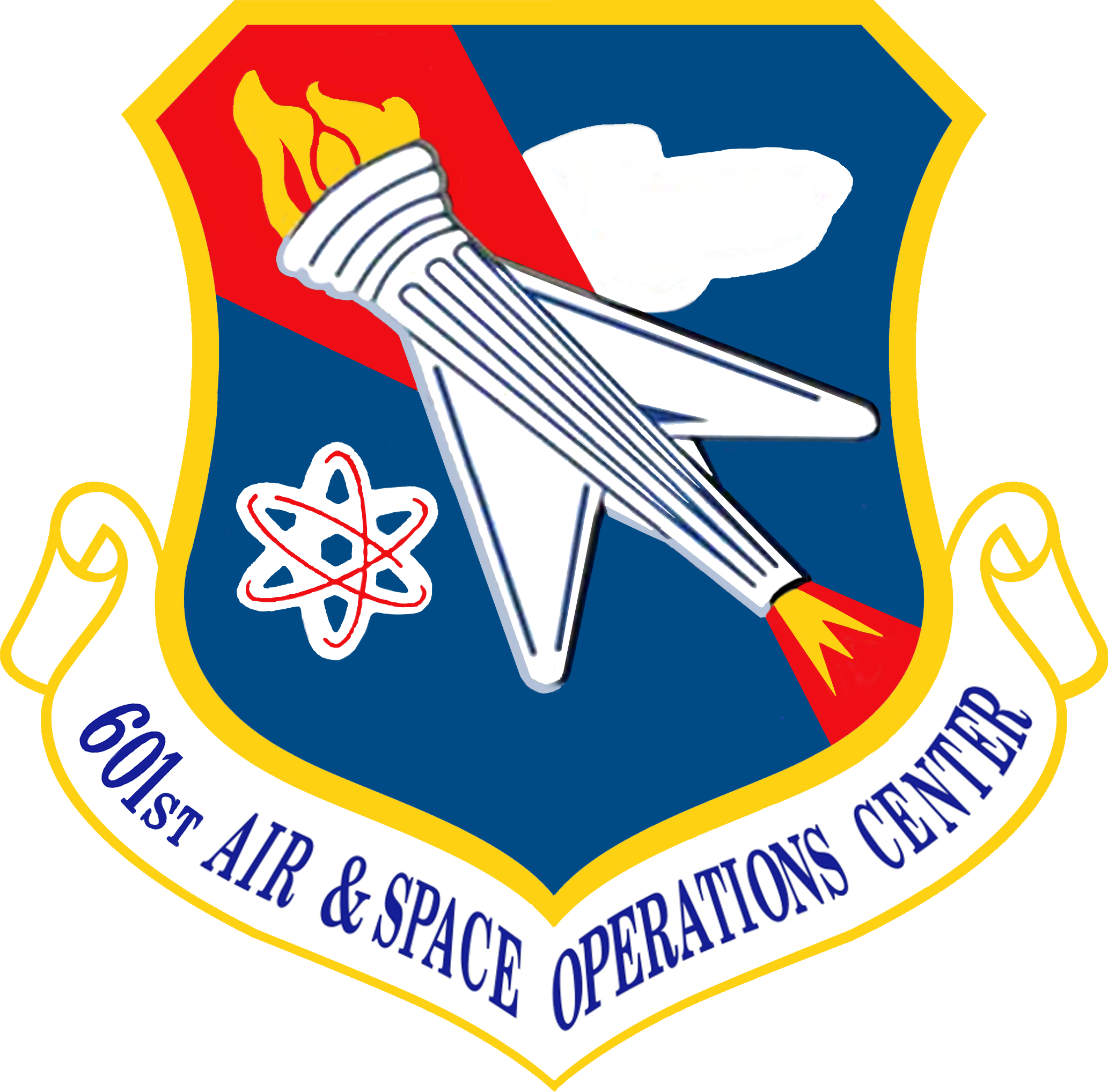
- 601st Air and Space Operations Center emblem

The 601st Air Operations Center (601 AOC) is an active unit of the United States Air Force, assigned to the First Air Force and stationed at Tyndall Air Force Base, Florida. The unit plans, directs, and assesses air operations for the North American Aerospace Defense Command (NORAD) as the Continental U.S. NORAD Region (CONR), and the United States Northern Command (NORTHCOM), as the operations hub for First Air Force. It provides aerospace warning and control for NORAD Defensive Counter Air (DCA) activities. It also directs Air Force activities in support of NORTHCOM homeland security and civil support missions. The 601 AOC directs all air sovereignty activities for the continental United States.

The 601st Air & Space Operations Center was activated on 1 November 2007 at Tyndall. The DAF/A1M letter directing this action was dated 25 October 2007, and is almost certainly the date of the center's constitution. Other Air Operations Centers dropped the "space" from their name in late 2014. Simultaneous with the center's activation, the 701st Air Defense Squadron, 1st Information Operations Flight, and Air Forces Northern (First Air Force), Provisional, were all inactivated. Manning for America's AOC primarily comes from the 101st Air and Space Operations Group (AOG) of the Florida Air National Guard. The 101st AOG, formally known as the Southeast Air Defense Sector, stood up on July 1, 2009.

== Mission ==
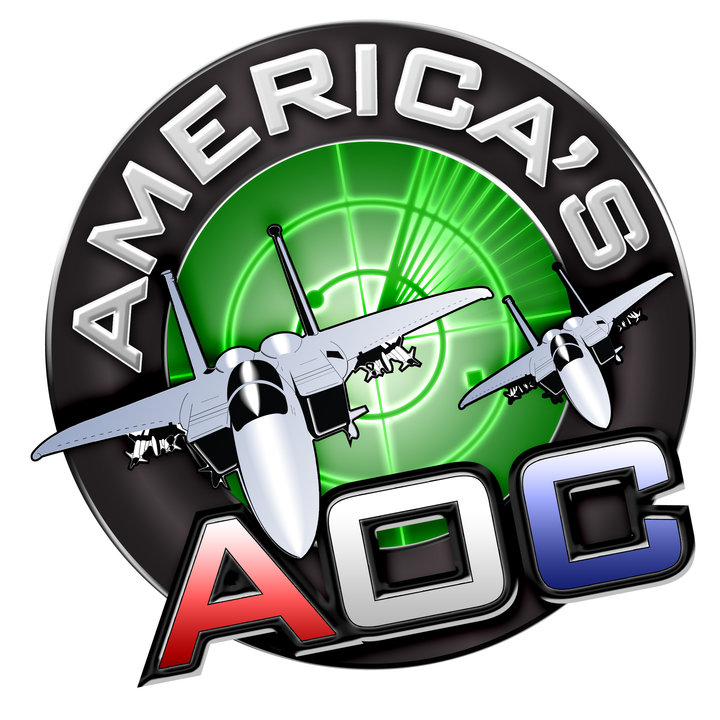

The 601st Air and Space Operations Center provides strategic air defense/sovereignty, tactical warning/assessment to Commander NORAD and Combined Air Operations Center in support of homeland defense and security of the southeastern United States. The AOC also integrates ground, maritime, and airborne sensors/communications and employs fighter and air refueling aircraft. The organization also interfaces with other services/agencies including USSOUTHCOM, FAA, USCG, and U.S. Customs Service.

== Units and partner organizations ==
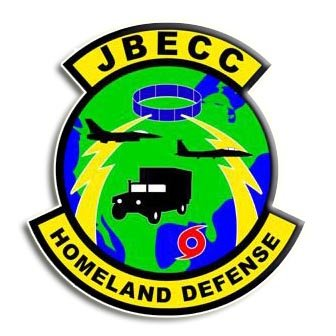
Joint Based Expeditionary Connectivity Center Emblem

Eastern Air Defense Sector (EADS)

The EADS is one of two sectors responsible for the air defense of the continental United States, the other being the Western Air Defense Sector (WADS) located at Joint Base Lewis-McChord in Washington state.

Western Air Defense Sector (WADS)

The WADS is one of two sectors responsible for the air defense of the continental United States, the other being the Eastern Air Defense Sector (EADS) located at Griffiss Business and Technology Park in Rome, New York, the former Griffiss Air Force Base.

=== Joint Based Expeditionary Connectivity Center ===
The Joint Based Expeditionary Connectivity Center (JBECC) is a highly mobile, small footprint, vehicle-mounted set of communications equipment that can rapidly deploy to build an integrated air picture, from multiple Federal Aviation Administration and tactical radars, within a defined geographical area. This capability enabled NORAD to better detect, track, identify, and engage any airborne aircraft, cruise missile, unmanned aerial vehicle, or remotely piloted vehicle.

It was developed in early 2001 as part of the Deputy Undersecretary of Defense for Advanced Systems and Concepts Advanced Concept Technology Demonstration program. Since 11 September 2001, the JBECC has participated in over a dozen operational missions, to protect the President of the United States, the National Capital Region, the 2004 Group of Eight (G8) Summit, United Nations General Assembly, Space Shuttle Launches, and Super Bowl XLI. It was a key component of NORAD's Deployable-Homeland Air and Cruise Missile Defense Mission.

Air Force Rescue Coordination Center Emblem

=== Air Force Rescue Coordination Center ===
As the United States inland search and rescue (SAR) mission coordinator, the Air Force Rescue Coordination Center (AFRCC) serves as the single agency responsible for coordinating life saving federal SAR services, ensuring timely and effective lifesaving operations within the 48 contiguous United States and supporting Mexican and Canadian requests for their SAR operations. The unit’s responsibilities include: initiating searches for missing/overdue aircraft (e.g., all DoD, commercial, and interstate aircraft or intrastate aircraft if requested by the state), managing all inland emergency beacon searches, and supporting state and local SAR operations (e.g., missing person searches, MEDEVAC, organ transport, etc.) The AFRCC operates 24 hours a day, seven days a week and is staffed by one watch supervisor and up to four SAR controllers.
