= CFS Ramore =

US radar station in Ontario, Canada 1953–1974

CFS Station Ramore

Site information
- Type: Radar Station
- Code: C-10
- Controlled by: United States Air Force; Royal Canadian Air Force

Location
- Coordinates: 48°25′37″N 080°14′30″W

Site history
- Built: 1953
- Built by: United States Air Force
- In use: 1953-1962,1962-1974

Location of Canadian Forces Station Ramore, Ontario

Station badge

Canadian Forces Station Ramore (ADC ID: C-10) is a closed General Surveillance Radar station. It is located 4 miles (6.4 km) east of Ramore, Ontario. It was closed in 1974. It was operated as part of the Pinetree Line network controlled by NORAD. It has since been sold and is now private property.

Ramore is located close to the site of Mid-Canada Line Site 070 Kempis, which operated a communications relay as part of the Mid-Canada Line. They are situated on either side of Ontario Highway 11, a short distance southwest of the town of Matheson.

== History ==
As a result of the Cold War and with the expansion of a North American continental air defence system, Ramore was selected as a site for a United States Air Force (USAF) radar station, one of the many that would make up the Pinetree Line of Ground-Control Intercept (GCI) radar sites. Construction on the Ramore base began in 1950 and was completed by 1953. The base was manned by members of the USAF's Air Defense Command (ADC) 912th Aircraft Control and Warning Squadron, being known as Ramore Air Station.

Ramore contained an AN/FPS-3 search radar, AB/TPS-502 Height finder radar and an AN/FPS-502 Back-Up Search radar. The back-up radar could function as either search or height radar. The operating radius was approximately 180 miles which stretched as far west as Hearst and as far north as Moosonee.

Pinetree stations were also subject to ground attacks. Each station was equipped with a Base Defence Force or BDF whose skills were sometimes tested against army units during practice drills.

Station personnel were often located in rural locations and had to occupy themselves during their off time. Many joined sports teams, motorcycling clubs, stamp clubs or amateur radio associations. Civilians were welcomed at the base either as club participants or to the recreational facilities such as the swimming pool. Some of the buildings located on the property included the combined mess hall, officers quarters, NCO's quarters, OR's quarters, Supply, Administration & Recreation Building, chlorinator house, guard shack, heated garages and power plant.

The AC&W squadron remained in control of operations at Ramore until early 1962 when operation of the radar base was transferred from the Americans to the Canadian military under operation of the Number 35 Aircraft Control & Warning Squadron. The RCAF renamed the site RCAF Station Ramore. This was part of an arrangement with the United States that came as a result of the cancellation of the Avro Arrow. Canada would lease 66 F-101 Voodoo fighters and take over operation of 12 Pinetree radar bases including Ramore. New equipment was also acquired around that time, with AN/FPS-27, AN/FPS-6B, and AN/FPS-26 radars and then in computers as part of the squadron's automation.

Ground to air communications, originally provided from separate TX and RX buildings and antenna farms on the station, was moved off site to the RCAF Station Ramore GATR site on 1 April 1963.

On 10 August 1967, the 35 Radar Squadron became known as Canadian Forces Station (CFS) Ramore when it combined with the Canadian Armed Forces. It continued to serve as an advance warning system until its closure on 1 April 1974, along with two other stations in Ontario when they were deemed no longer necessary. By the 1980s some of the vacuum-tube equipment at the bases had become so obsolete that replacement tubes could only be obtained from factories in the Soviet Union. Two of the radar antennas were donated to the Military Communications and Electronics Museum in Kingston upon Ramore's closure.

CFS Lowther near Hearst and CFS Senneterre in Quebec handled the coverage area that Ramore had previously monitored.

In 1975, the station was sold to the Black River-Matheson township for $100,000 and was reopened as the Lava Mountain Lodge, a resort and drinking establishment.

== See also ==
- List of Royal Canadian Air Force stations
- List of USAF Aerospace Defense Command General Surveillance Radar Stations
