= Dauphin Island Air Force Station =

Former US Air Force base

Dauphin Island Air Force Station
- Part of Air Defense Command (ADC)

Site information
- Type: Air Force Station
- Code: ADC ID: TM-196, NORAD ID: Z-196, Z-249
- Controlled by: United States Air Force

Location
- Coordinates: 30°15′01″N 088°04′42″W

Site history
- Built: 1958
- In use: 1958-1974

Garrison information
- Garrison: 693d Aircraft Control and Warning (later Radar) Squadron; 635th Aircraft Control and Warning (later Radar) Squadron

Dauphin Island Air Force Station is a closed United States Air Force General Surveillance Radar station. It is located 1.9 miles (3.1 km) east of Dauphin Island, Alabama, near historic Fort Gaines (Alabama). It was closed in 1980.

Beginning in September 1982, the Federal Aviation Administration (FAA) acquired part of the facility. Today the site is part of the Joint Surveillance System (JSS), designated by NORAD as Eastern Air Defense Sector (EADS) Ground Equipment Facility J-12 with an ARSR-2 radar.

== History ==
Dauphin Island Air Force Station came into existence as part of Phase III of the Air Defense Command Mobile Radar program. On 20 October 1953 ADC requested a third phase of twenty-five radar sites be constructed.

The 693d Aircraft Control and Warning Squadron was assigned to the station on 1 September 1958. The site had an AN/FPS-20 search radar and two AN/FPS-6A height-finder radars, and initially the station functioned as an aircraft control and warning station.

The Ground Air Transmitting Receiving (GATR) Site for communications was located at 30°14′47″N 088°04′56″W, approximately 0.4 mile southeast from the main site. Normally the GATR site was connected by a pair of buried telephone cables, with a backup connection of dual telephone cables overhead. The Coordinate Data Transmitting Set (CDTS) (AN/FST-2) at the main site converted each radar return into a digital word which was transmitted by the GATR via microwave to the Control center.

Dauphin Island AFS began operating an AN/FPS-7 radar in 1960, and joined the Semi Automatic Ground Environment (SAGE) system, feeding data to DC-09 at Gunter AFB, Alabama. After joining, the squadron was re-designated as the 693d Radar Squadron (SAGE) on 1 March 1961. The radar squadron provided information 24/7 the SAGE Direction Center where it was analyzed to determine range, direction, altitude, speed and whether or not aircraft were friendly or hostile. On 31 July 1963, the site was redesignated as NORAD ID Z-196.

In 1961 Dauphin Island AFS became a joint-use facility with the Federal Aviation Administration (FAA). However, it was removed from joint-use status in 1962 and then put back in joint-use status in 1963. A second radar squadron, the 635th Radar Squadron, arrived from Fort Lawton, Washington on 1 January 1963. This unit operated an AN/FPS-93 and an AN/FPS-6 radar. In 1965, the site was again removed from joint-use status.

Over the years, the equipment at the station was upgraded or modified to improve the efficiency and accuracy of the information gathered by the radars. The Air Force inactivated the 693d on 30 September 1970. In 1972, Dauphin Island became part of the Southern Air Defense Systems (SADS). It was given a new NORAD designation, Z-249. The 635th was inactivated on 1 July 1974.

The radar site became Operating Location G, 630th Radar Squadron, which inactivated on 31 December 1977. It then became Operating Location E, 678th Air Defense Group. The site closed for good on 30 September 1980.

Today the station is the Dauphin Island Sea Lab, Alabama's primary marine education and research center. Part of the station also is used by the United States Coast Guard as a recreational facility. Most of the USAF buildings have found new uses, and several radar towers have been re-purposed.

== See also ==
- List of USAF Aerospace Defense Command General Surveillance Radar Stations
- List of United States Air Force aircraft control and warning squadrons
