= Crystal Springs Air Force Station =

USAF General Surveillance Radar station

Crystal Springs Air Force Station
- Part of Air Defense Command (ADC)

Site information
- Type: Air Force Station
- Code: ADC ID: TM-195, NORAD ID: Z-195
- Controlled by: United States Air Force
- Condition: closed

Location
- Location of Crystal Springs AFS, Mississippi
- Coordinates: 31°58′45″N 090°20′40″W

Site history
- Built: 1958
- In use: 1958-1968

Garrison information
- Garrison: 627th Aircraft Control and Warning Squadron

Crystal Springs Air Force Station is a closed United States Air Force General Surveillance Radar station. It is located in Crystal Springs, Mississippi. It was closed in 1968.

Crystal Springs Air Force Station came into existence as part of Phase III of the Air Defense Command Mobile Radar program. On 20 October 1953 ADC requested a third phase of twenty-five radar sites be constructed.

== History ==
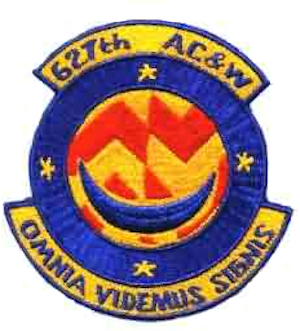
627 Radar Squadron patch

The 627th Aircraft Control and Warning Squadron was assigned on 1 September 1958 and began testing the AN/FPS-27 frequency-diversified search radar. During 1959 Crystal Springs AFS joined the Semi Automatic Ground Environment (SAGE) system, initially feeding data to DC-09 at Gunter AFB, Alabama. After joining, the squadron was re-designated as the 627th Radar Squadron (SAGE) on 1 October 1959. The radar squadron provided information 24/7 the SAGE Direction Center where it was analyzed to determine range, direction altitude speed and whether or not aircraft were friendly or hostile.

In addition to the main facility, Crystal Springs operated an AN/FPS-14 Gap Filler site:

- Summit, MS (TM-195A): 31°17′28″N 090°27′29″W

Two height-finder radars, types AN/FPS-6A and AN/FPS-90, were also installed in the early 1960s. The 627th Radar Squadron was inactivated on 6 September 1968 and Crystal Springs AFS was closed due to a draw-down of ADC and budget constraints. The site has been turned into a Job Corps training center by the State of Mississippi. Most of the former USAF buildings remain along with base housing. The radar tower footprints are still visible in aerial photography.

== See also ==
- List of USAF Aerospace Defense Command General Surveillance Radar Stations
