= 678th Air Defense Group =

- Active: 1970–1983
- Country: United States
- Branch: United States Air Force
- Role: Air defense
- Decorations: Air Force Outstanding Unit Award

Insignia
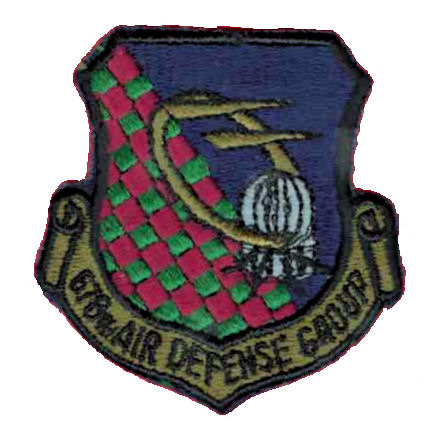
- Subdued patch with 678th Air Defense Group emblem

The 678th Air Defense Group is a disbanded United States Air Force organization. Its last assignment was with the 20th Air Division of Air Defense Command at Tyndall Air Force Base, Florida. The group was formed in 1970 when ADC expanded its radar units that operated Back-Up Interceptor Control sites from squadron sized units to groups. From 1977 until it was inactivated in 1983 the 678th was responsible for operating the Southern Air Defense System.

== History ==
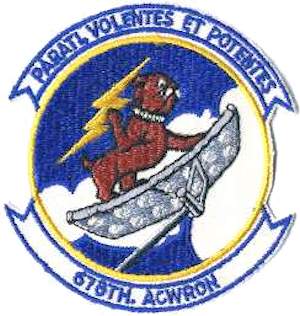
Emblem of the 678th Aircraft Control and Warning (later Radar) Squadron

The 678th Air Defense Group replaced the 678th Radar Squadron (SAGE) (formerly the 678th Aircraft Warning & Control Squadron) at Tyndall Air Force Base in 1970. The group operated a Back-Up Interceptor Control (BUIC) site with the mission to back up the centralized and vulnerable Semi-Automatic Ground Environment (SAGE) operations center of the 20th Air Division at Gunter Air Force Base, Alabama. The BUIC III operated by the group gave the unit a semi-automatic control capability, unlike earlier BUIC systems that required manual operation. The group provided air defense mission command and control from 1970 to 1983. It was a component of Aerospace Defense Command (ADC) (later transferred to Tactical Air Command (TAC)) Air Defense Weapons Center from 1974 to 1981. The group earned an Air Force Outstanding Unit Award for exceptionally meritorious service for the period 1 June 1970 through 1 June 1972.

In 1969, the inadequacy of the radar coverage to the south of the United States had been dramatically illustrated whan a Cuban Mikoyan-Gurevich MiG-17 went undetected before it landed at Homestead Air Force Base, south of Miami, Florida. and two years later, an Antonov An-24 similarly arrived unannounced at New Orleans International Airport. As a result, ADC established The Southern Air Defense System (SADS). Initially, the 630th Radar Squadron operated a manual control center at the Houston Air Route Traffic Control Center and the USAF added radars to supplement the existing Federal Aviation Administration coverage in the Caribbean area. In 1977, responsibility for operating the SADS control center was transferred to the group, which was operating the last BUIC III site in ADC. The previous year the group also assumed responsibility to operate the Tyndall NORAD Control Center.

The group continued to act as a control center until it was inactivated in 1983 when the Tyndall radar site became part of the Joint Surveillance System.

== Lineage ==
- Constituted as 678th Air Defense Group on 13 February 1970

Activated on 1 March 1970
Inactivated on 1 March 1983
Disbanded on 27 September 1984

=== Assignments ===
- 20th Air Division, 1 March 1970 – 1 March 1983

=== Components ===
None

=== Stations ===
- Tyndall AFB, Florida, 1 March 1970 – 1 March 1983 30°04′35″N 085°36′35″W

=== Awards ===
Award streamer	Award	Dates	Notes
	Air Force Outstanding Unit Award	1 June 1970-1 June 1972	
