= 33rd Air Division =

33d Air Division

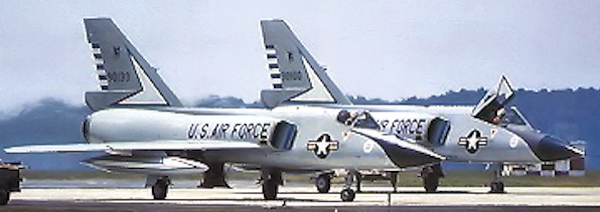
- F-106s of the division's 48th Fighter-Interceptor Squadron
- Active: 1951–1961; 1966–1969
- Country: United States
- Branch: United States Air Force
- Role: Command of air defense forces
- Part of: Air Defense Command

Insignia
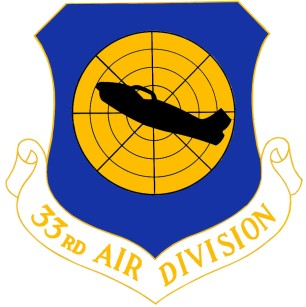
- 33d Air Division emblem (Approved 24 September 1953)

The 33rd Air Division (33d AD) is an inactive United States Air Force organization. Its last assignment was with Air Defense Command, assigned to First Air Force, being stationed at Fort Lee Air Force Station, Virginia. It was inactivated on 19 November 1969.

== History ==
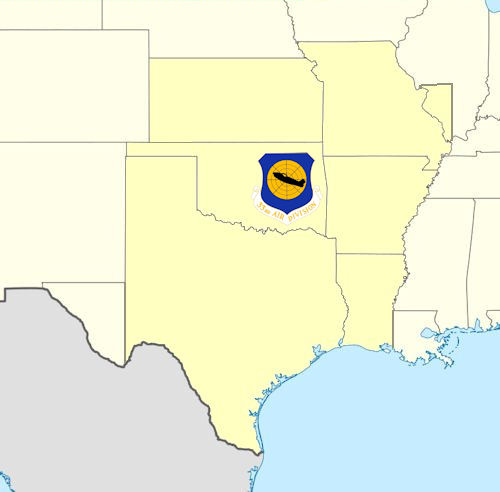
33d Air Division AOR 1951–1961

The 33d Air Division had air defense responsibility for an area encompassing Oklahoma, Arkansas, Texas, Louisiana, and parts of Kansas, Missouri, and Mississippi in March 1951. It was inactivated in June 1961.

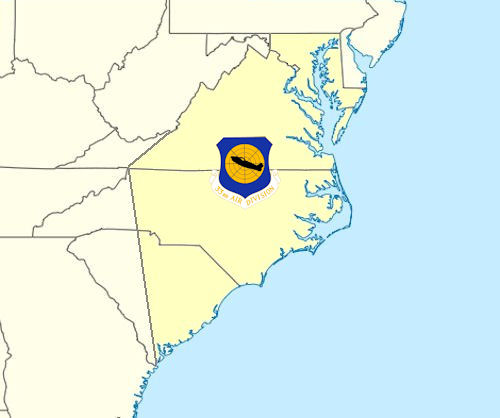
33d Air Division AOR 1966–1969

Activated again in 1966, replacing the Washington Air Defense Sector with its area changed to cover parts of North Carolina, South Carolina, and Virginia. Assumed additional designation of 33d NORAD Region after activation of the NORAD Combat Operations Center at the Cheyenne Mountain Complex, Colorado and reporting was transferred to NORAD from ADC at Ent Air Force Base in April 1966. The division supervised, administered, and trained its assigned units and, in doing so, participated in numerous live and simulated exercises.

== Lineage ==
- Established as the 33 Air Division (Defense) on 5 March 1951

Activated on 19 March 1951
Inactivated on 1 February 1952

- Organized on 1 February 1952

Redesignated 33 Air Division (SAGE) on 1 January 1960
Discontinued, and inactivated, on 1 July 1961

- Redesignated 33 Air Division and activated on 20 January 1966 (not organized)

Organized on 1 April 1966
Inactivated on 19 November 1969

=== Assignments ===
- Air Defense Command

Eastern Air Defense Force 19 March – 20 May 1951
Central Air Defense Force, 20 May 1951 – 1 January 1960

- Air Defense Command, 1 January 1960 – 1 July 1961
- Air Defense Command, 20 January 1966 (not organized)

First Air Force, 1 April 1966 – 19 November 1969

=== Stations ===
- Tinker Air Force Base, Oklahoma 19 March 1951 – 8 May 1956
- Oklahoma City Air Force Station, Oklahoma, 8 May 1956
- Richards-Gebaur Air Force Base, Missouri, 1 January 1960 – 1 July 1961
- Fort Lee Air Force Station, Virginia 19 April 1966 – 19 November 1969

=== Components ===
==== Sectors ====
- Albuquerque Air Defense Sector: 1 January – 1 November 1960

Kirtland Air Force Base, New Mexico

- Kansas City Air Defense Sector: 1 January 1960 – 1 July 1961

Richards-Gebaur Air Force Base, Missouri

- Oklahoma City Air Defense Sector: 1 January 1960 – 1 July 1961

Oklahoma City Air Force Base, Oklahoma

- Sioux City Air Defense Sector: 1 January 1960 – 1 July 1961

Sioux City Municipal Airport, Iowa

==== Groups ====
- 328th Fighter Group: 18 August 1955 – 1 March 1956

Richards-Gebaur Air Force Base, Missouri

- 546th Aircraft Control and Warning Group

Tinker Air Force Base, Oklahoma, 19 March-4 June 1951

- 4676th Air Defense Group: 2 March 1954 – 18 August 1955

Richards-Gebaur Air Force Base, Missouri

==== Interceptor squadrons ====
- 48th Fighter-Interceptor Squadron: 1 April 1966 – 19 November 1969

Langley Air Force Base, Virginia

- 85th Fighter-Interceptor Squadron: 1 November 1952 – 1 March 1956

Scott Air Force Base, Illinois

- 95th Fighter-Interceptor Squadron: 1 December 1967 – 19 November 1969

Dover Air Force Base, Delaware

- 113th Fighter-Interceptor Squadron: 1 April – 1 November 1952

Scott Air Force Base, Illinois

- 326th Fighter-Interceptor Squadron: 18 December 1953 – 2 March 1954

Fairfax Field, Kansas

- 331st Fighter-Interceptor Squadron: 15 August 1958 – 1 January 1960

Webb Air Force Base, Texas

- 332d Fighter-Interceptor Squadron: 10 July 1959 – 1 January 1960

England Air Force Base, Louisiana

- 444th Fighter-Interceptor Squadron: 1 April 1966 – 30 September 1968

Charleston Air Force Base, South Carolina

==== Missile squadrons ====
- 22d Air Defense Missile Squadron (BOMARC): 1 April 1966 – 19 November 1969

Langley Air Force Base, Virginia

==== Radar squadrons ====
- 632d Radar Squadron

Roanoke Rapids Air Force Station, North Carolina, 1 April 1966 – 19 November 1969

- 644th Radar Squadron

Richmond Air Force Station, Florida, 14–19 November 1969

- 645th Radar Squadron

Patrick Air Force Base, Florida, 14–19 November 1969

- 649th Radar Squadron

Bedford Air Force Station, Virginia, 1 April 1966 – 19 November 1969

- 657th Radar Squadron

Houma Air Force Station, Louisiana, 14–19 November 1969

- 662d Radar Squadron

Oakdale Air Force Station, Pennsylvania, 16 September-31 December 1969

- 671st Radar Squadron

Key West Naval Air Station, Florida, 14–19 November 1969

- 678th Radar Squadron

Tyndall Air Force Base, Florida, 14–19 November 1969

- 679th Radar Squadron

Jacksonville Naval Air Station, Florida, 14–19 November 1969

- 680th Radar Squadron

Palermo Air Force Station, New Jersey, 1 April 1968 – 19 November 1969

- 693d Radar Squadron

Dauphin Island Air Force Station, Alabama, 14–19 November 1969

- 701st Radar Squadron

Fort Fisher Air Force Station, North Carolina, 1 April 1966 – 19 November 1969

- 702d Radar Squadron

Hunter Air Force Base, Georgia, 14–19 November 1969

- 725th Aircraft Control and Warning Squadron

Walnut Ridge Air Force Station, Arkansas, 8 April 1955 – 1 March 1956

- 738th Aircraft Control and Warning Squadron

Olathe Air Force Station, Kansas, 1 February 1953 – 1 March 1956

- 770th Radar Squadron

Fort George G. Meade, Maryland, 1 April 1966 – 19 November 1969

- 790th Aircraft Control and Warning Squadron

Kirksville Air Force Station, Missouri, 6 February 1952 – 1 March 1956

- 792d Radar Squadron

North Charleston Air Force Station, South Carolina, 1 April 1966 – 19 November 1969

- 793d Aircraft Control and Warning Squadron

Hutchinson Air Force Station, Kansas, 6 February 1952 – 1 March 1956

- 810th Radar Squadron

Winston-Salem Air Force Station, North Carolina, 1 April 1966 – 19 November 1969

- 861st Radar Squadron

Aiken Air Force Station, South Carolina, 14–19 November 1969

== See also ==
- List of United States Air Force Aerospace Defense Command Interceptor Squadrons
- List of United States Air Force air divisions
- United States general surveillance radar stations
