= Ground Equipment Facility QRC =

FAA radar station

Ground Equipment Facility QRC Benton Air Force Station
- Part of 1975: Federal Aviation Administration; 1968: Aerospace Defense Command; 1951: Air Defense Command
- Located at Red Rock Mountain, Colley Township, Sullivan County, Pennsylvania (eponym: the nearby Town of Benton)
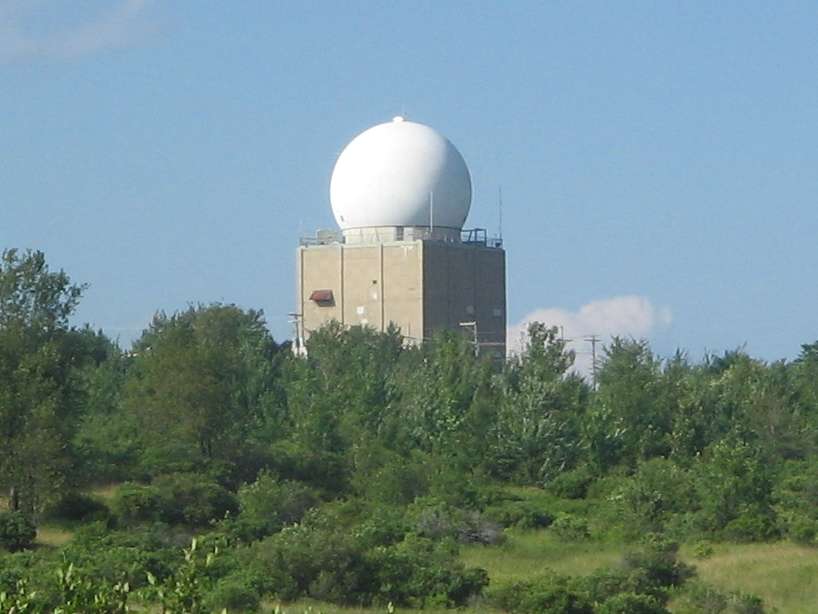
- The AN/FPS-67B radar antenna is beneath a radome (white) and uses the preceding AN/FPS-35 tower (5-story building).

Site information
- Type: Common Air-Route Surveillance Radar (CARSR) site
- Code: QRC: Federal Aviation Administration; J-tbd: c. 2002 Joint Surveillance System; Z-30: 1963 July 31 SAGE radar network P-30: 1952 Permanent System
- Controlled by: 1975: Federal Aviation Administration 1974:: 648th Radar Squadron; 1959: 648th Radar Squadron (SAGE) 1950: 648th Aircraft Control and Warning Squadron

Location
- Coordinates: 41°21′25″N 076°17′25″W (QRS); 41°21′30″N 076°17′40″W (AFS)

Site history
- Built: 1950-1
- Unmanned Gap Filler radar annexes: P-30E (Bendix AN/FPS-14) Ulysses, Pennsylvania; 41°52′48″N 077°42′51″W; P-30F (Bendix AN/FPS-18) Joliett, Pennsylvania; 40°36′32″N 076°27′42″W The annex buildings and radar towers are still extant (the "A" through "D" gap fillers at Middleburg, Topton, East Meredith, & Montrose PA; as well as the H-J gap fillers at Claysburg, Hayley, and--in New York--Trumbull Corners, were never built.)

Ground Equipment Facility QRC (FUDS C03PA046300: "Benton Air Force Communications Annex") is an FAA radar station that was part of a Cold War SAGE radar station (Benton Air Force Station, call sign: Oppose) for aircraft control and warning "from Massachusetts to southern Virginia, and as far out to sea as possible." Benton AFS was also the first operational "regional data processing center" for the GE 477L Nuclear Detection and Reporting System.

The FAA facility and the larger area of the former Air Force Station are part of Ricketts Glen State Park.

== History ==
The 648th Aircraft Control and Warning Squadron was activated on 30 April 1948 at Pine Camp in upstate New York, as the 655th AC&WS's Lashup station L-6. The 648th AC&WS transferred in December 1949 to Indiantown Gap Army Installation (AIN) and c. 1 January 1951 began operations at the initial site with a General Electric AN/CPS-6B radar scanner. Site construction on 98-acre (40 ha) had begun in 1950 and was completed September 21, 1951. On September 21, 1951, the last of the 658th personnel arrived at the site from Fort Indiantown Gap. The radar and operations moved to Ricketts Glen State Park, Pennsylvania, by 1 February 1952.

=== Benton Air Force Station ===
On 1 December 1953, the radar station at Ricketts Glen State Park was designated Benton Air Force Station which initially provided tracking data to a Manual Air Defense Control Center, e.g., on August 15, 1958, the 26th Air Division/Syracuse Air Defense Sector's "Combat Alert Center (Manual)" at Roslyn AFS began using Benton data for manual GCI. But in less than two months, the "manual division" headquarters at Hancock Field/Syracuse AFS was eliminated--"the 26th was moved out of Roslyn and established at Syracuse as a [computerized] SAGE division on 1 September" 1958. But [the Syracuse DC with AN/FSQ-7] did not become operational until 1 January 1959" (cf. the Office of Civil Defense and Mobilization warning center at Stewart AFB—1 of 3 for national civil defense—was moved to Syracuse and redesignated the "OCDM 26th Warning Center" on 1 July 1959). On 1 July 1959, concurrent with the discontinuance of Eastern NORAD Region, the warning center was moved from Stewart AFB, New York, to Syracuse, New York, and redesignated the OCDM 26th Warning Center." Benton's data was initially entered in the "Manual Inputs" terminals of the Syracuse's SAGE Direction Center.

A Burroughs AN/FST-2 Coordinate Data Transmitting Set was installed early in 1960 to transmit data to the Syracuse DC and the May 1960 Highlands AADS (Nike Missile Master). One of the 1st 4 Sperry AN/FPS-35 Frequency Diversity Radars (Site 3) became operational at Benton in 1961—the radar was 70 short tons (64 t; 63 long tons) with a red/white checkerboard pattern. A new GATR annex (R-tbd) was completed "about 4 miles (6.4 km) from the main site as part of the SAGE modernization" (u,e,m after the 1st GATR was completed in April 1961), and Benton AFS was assigned to the Boston Air Defense Sector (Stewart AFB DC) on September 4, 1963. A "Two Row Angular Contact Ball" bearing that had been "procured as a spare for the Lincoln Labs CCM-Mark I Radar was installed in the AN/FPS-35 at Benton" and failed at 25,000 hours. "In 1963 the search radar was complemented by Avco AN/FPS-26A and an GE AN/FPS-6" to perform SAGE height finding requests.

==== FAA, NUDETS, and missile tracking operations ====
By the end of 1963 Benton AFS was a joint-use site for both the USAF and FAA; by 1967 it was providing tracks to the "traffic control facility in New York". A February 5, 1962, contract for a prototype nuclear detection system established sensors at the Benton, Bedford (Virginia), and Temperanceville (Virginia) stations and the 1st phase of the NUDETS "became operational on 1 July 1964 [and] consisted of a regional data processing center at Benton AFS, Pa., and sensors located at Benton, Thomas, West Virginia, Manassas Air Force Station, and Hermanville, Maryland" (RP-54A/Z-227A, 38°13′40″N 076°24′33″W).

Benton's FPS-35 was modified and "tested during the summer of 1962" to track Cape Canaveral missile launches ("marginal ability"), and Benton AFS had Backup Interceptor Control capability by December 1962(General Electric AN/GPA-37 Course Directing Group). An AN/FPS-8 backup search radar owned/operated by the FAA was in place by September 1967, when new "AN/GPA-98, ECM training simulator, and AN/FYQ-47, the new digital data processor which replaces the AN/FST-2" were planned. Before 1974 when the AN/FPS-35 was replaced, FCC direction-finding equipment was used after the radar "scopes would light up like light bulbs" almost every morning for a half-hour—a noisy UHF TV tuner in the area was located which was being used for a "soap opera on one of the local channels".

=== Formerly used defense site ===
After Project Concise Air Defense closures were announced on November 22, 1974; the radar facility of Benton AFS transferred to the Federal Aviation Administration on June 30, 1975 (the squadron was also inactivated on that date.) as an auxiliary radar for Wilkes-Barre/Scranton International Airport—other buildings and barracks transferred to the Red Rock Job Corps Center in 1978. In 1995, Benton was the backup air traffic control radar when the airport near Avoca needed data. After 2001 the FAA site became part of the Joint Surveillance System, and the "FPS-67B, now Common Air-Route Surveillance Radar (CARSR)" was used in a 2004 FAA test. In 2013, a new maintenance contract was issued for the "Qrc Arsr Hvac Pwr Project".

=== Assignments ===
Benton AFS and its USAF squadron were assigned to several larger units of Air Defense Command (Aerospace Defense Command after 1968), but after data transmission was automated in 1960, its radar tracks were provided to more than one Direction Center (e.g., "three air divisions simultaneously - 35th, 21st, and 34th Air Divisions" in September 1967):

- 503d Aircraft Control and Warning Group, 1 January 1951
- 26th Air Division, 6 February 1952
- 4710th Defense Wing, 10 February 1953
- 4709th Defense Wing, 30 June 1953
- 4707th Air Defense Wing, 8 July 1956
- 4622d Air Defense Wing, 18 October 1956
- Boston Air Defense Sector, 8 January 1957
- Syracuse Air Defense Sector, 15 August 1958
- Boston Air Defense Sector, 4 September 1963
- 35th Air Division, 1 April 1966
- 21st Air Division, 19 November 1969 – 30 June 1975
