= AN/FPS-26 Radar =

Cold War-era American height finder radar

AN/FPS-26
- Country of origin: United States
- Type: Height-Finder Radar
- Frequency: 5400 to 5900 MHz
- Power: ~5 megawatts (peak)

The Avco AN/FPS-26 Radar was an Air Defense Command height finder radar developed in the Frequency Diversity Program with a tunable 3-cavity power klystron for electronic counter-countermeasures (e.g. to counter jamming). Accepted by the Rome Air Development Center on 20 January 1960 for use at SAGE radar stations, the AN/FPS-26 processed height-finder requests (e.g., from Air Defense Direction Centers) by positioning to the azimuth of a target aircraft using a high-pressure hydraulic drive, then "nodding" in either a default automatic mode or by operator command. The inflatable radome required a minimum pressure to prevent contact with the antenna which would result in damage to both (technicians accessed the antenna deck via an air lock.) To maintain high dielectric strength, the waveguide was pressurized with sulfur hexafluoride (SF_{6}), which technicians were warned would produce deadly fluorine if waveguide arcing occurred.

FPS-26 units were installed at Luke AFB, MacDill AFB (1961), Hunter AFB (1961), Chandler AFS (1961), Baudette AFS (1963), Las Vegas Air Force Station (1963), Montauk AFS, Lockport AFS (1962), Fort Fisher AFS (1962), Winston-Salem AFS (1962), North Charleston AFS (1961), Aiken AFS, and Sundance AFS. Charleston AFS, Charleston, ME (exact date of installation unknown some time between 1961–1963) Acme Missiles & Construction Corp., Rockville Centre, N.Y. built the radar tower facilities at Missile Master, Pittsburgh Defense Area, Oakdale, Pa.

In accordance with the Joint Electronics Type Designation System (JETDS), the "AN/FPS-26" designation represents the 26th design of an Army-Navy electronic device for fixed ground search radar. The JETDS system also now is used to name all Department of Defense electronic systems.

== Variants ==
A variant was the AN/FPS-26A with better ECCM capabilities. which was installed at Cambria AFS (1963), Klamath AFS (1963), Point Arena AFS, Boron AFS, Hutchinson AFS, North Truro AFS (1963), Calumet AFS, Selfridge AFB, Empire AFS (1963), Finland AFS (1963), Fortuna AFS, Opheim AFS, Highlands AFS, Gibbsboro AFS (1963), Watertown AFS (1963), Saratoga Springs AFS (1963), North Bend AFS, Mt. Hebo AFS, Benton AFS (1963), Oakdale AFS, St. Albans AFS (1963), Manassas AFS (1963), Cape Charles AFS (1963), Minot AFS, and Makah AFS. Also installed at Port Austin AFS unknown date.

In July 1965 for missile warning the AN/FPS-26 was modified to the Avco AN/FSS-7 SLBM Detection Radar for the AVCO 474N SLBM Detection an Warning System.

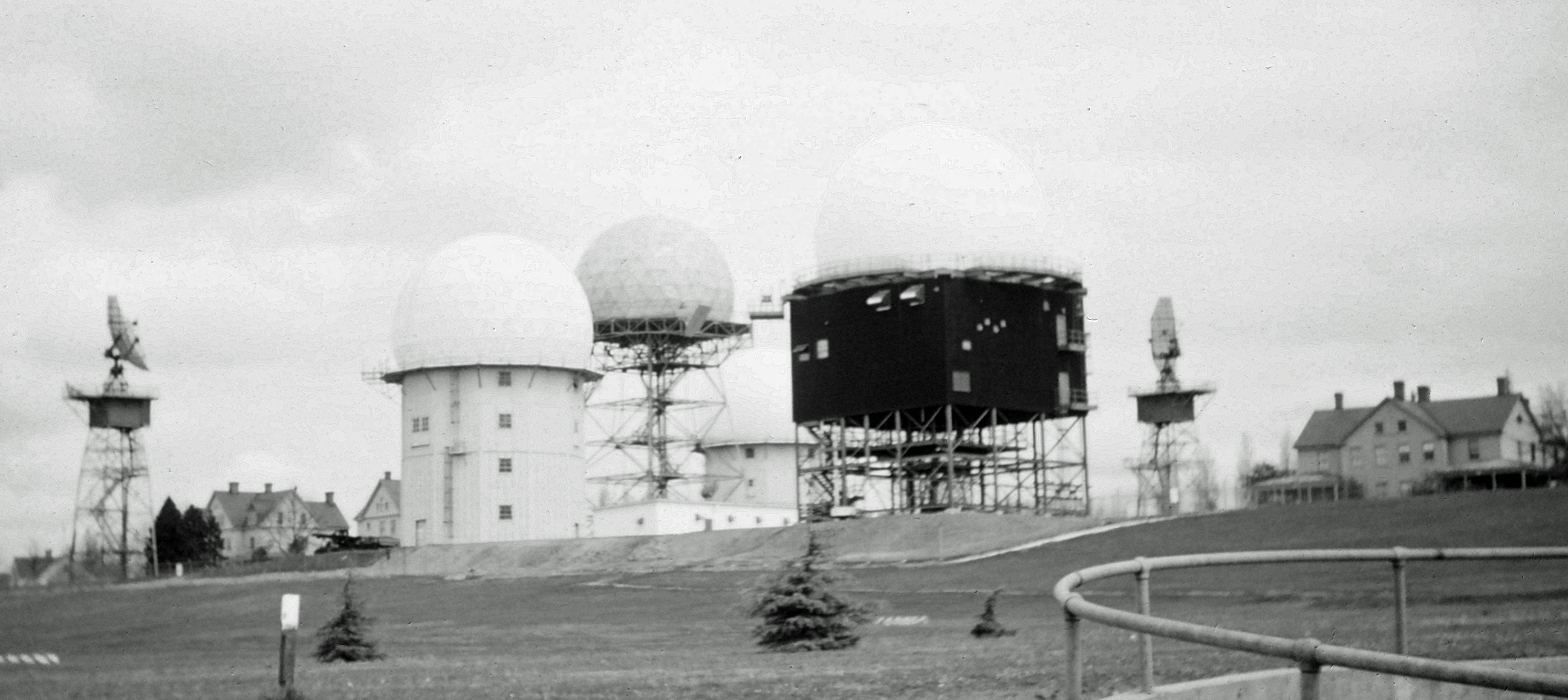
The foreground radome with dark-clad support structure houses a USAF AN/FPS-26A just completing construction c. late 1962 at the Missile Master military installation at Fort Lawton Air Force Station, which had a Direction Center in the nuclear bunker. The two radars without radomes are US Army AN/FPS-6 heightfinders; the radome with an open steel grid support structure is an FAA search radar; and the two radars with radomes and white clad support structures are USAF AN/FPS-6A heightfinders.

== See also ==
- List of radars
- List of military electronics of the United States
