= Fort Fisher Air Force Station =

Military radar station in North Carolina, United States (1955–1988)

- Part of Air Defense Command (ADC)
- Cape Fear, 0.8 miles (1.3 km) southwest of Kure Beach, North Carolina.
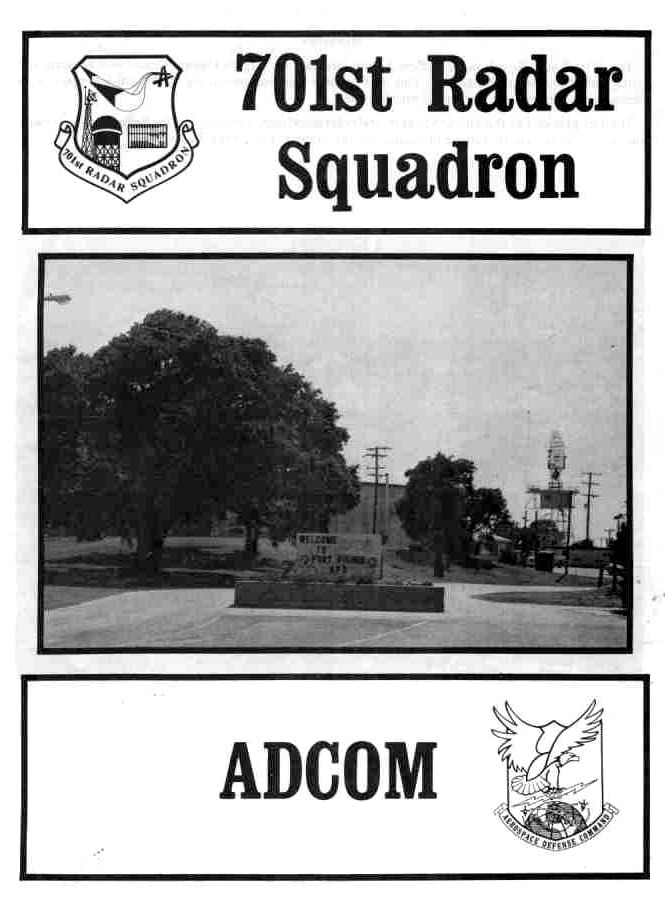
- Cover of welcome brochure, 701st Radar Squadron

Site information
- Type: Air Force Station
- Code: ADC ID: M-115, NORAD ID: Z-115; Currently JSS ID: J-02
- Controlled by: United States Air Force]

Location
- Coordinates: 33°59′24″N 077°55′06″W

Site history
- Built: 1955
- In use: 1955-1988 June 30

Garrison information
- Garrison: 701st Air Defense Group; 701st Aircraft Control and Warning (later Radar) Squadron

Location of Fort Fisher AFS, North Carolina

Fort Fisher Air Force Station was a United States Air Force installation located on the Atlantic coast 0.8 miles (1.3 km) southwest of Kure Beach, North Carolina. Its primary mission was as a radar complex. It was closed on 30 June 1988 by the Air Force, and turned over to the Federal Aviation Administration (FAA).

Today the radar installation that was the main part of the site is part of the Joint Surveillance System (JSS), designated by NORAD as Eastern Air Defense Sector (EADS) Ground Equipment Facility J-02.

== History ==
Fort Fisher during the American Civil War was a Confederate States of America stronghold that fell to Union forces on January 15, 1865 during the Second Battle of Fort Fisher. "Fort Fisher" had earthworks for the fort's land face, known as Shepard's Battery. In World War II, the nearby December 1940 Camp Davis had 5 live anti-aircraft ranges, including one named for Fort Fisher and which became the main AA range for the camp. (Note: Camp Davis used a World War II range at Fort Fisher—the camp was built in late December 1940 as an Army anti-aircraft artillery training facility, and the camp had ~20,000 officers and men of the First Army, Fourth Corps Area using more than 3,000 buildings on 45,538 acres (184.3 km^{2}) and new railroad spurs into the camp. Camp Davis' 4 other live anti-aircraft ranges were outside of the main post along the southern coast of North Carolina at Sears Point, New Topsail Inlet, Maple Hill, and Holly Shelter. The Fort Fisher range became the main range for Camp Davis and then was used for a United States Army Air Forces airfield.)

=== Fort Fisher AAF ===
Fort Fisher Army Airfield (Fort Fisher AAF) was established at the Fort Fisher anti-aircraft range and included construction of 48 frame buildings, 316 tent frames, showers and latrines, mess halls, warehouses, radio and meteorological stations, a post exchange, photo lab, recreation hall, outdoor theater, guardhouse, infirmary, and an administration building. The site had a 10,000-gallon water storage tank, a motor pool, a large parade ground, three steel observation towers along the beach, and a 2,500 ft (760 m) unpaved runway (the Shepard's Battery earthworks were leveled for the runway.) Today, the parking lot and visitor center for Fort Fisher sit on the remains of the runway.

When Camp Davis closed in 1944, Fort Fisher AAF had an 80-seat cafeteria, a 350-bed hospital and dental clinic, and covered an area of several hundred acres.

=== Fort Fisher AFS ===
Fort Fisher Air Force Station was opened in 1955 on part of the Fort Fisher AAF installation as USAF Permanent System radar station "M-115" during a $1 billion increase for US continental defense after Hq USAF approved the Mobile Radar program in mid-1954. It was assigned to Air Defense Command (ADC) as part of a planned deployment of forty-four Mobile radar stations. Fort Fisher AFS was designed as site M-115 and the 701st Aircraft Control and Warning Squadron was assigned on 1 August 1955.

ADC initially installed AN/MPS-7 and AN/MPS-8 radars at the site, and initially the station functioned as a Ground control intercept (GCI) and warning station to guide interceptor aircraft toward unidentified intruders picked up on the squadron's radar scopes. By 1958 the AN/MPS-8 had been converted into an AN/GPS-3 and an AN/MPS-14 had been added.

In 1962 an AN/FPS-7C and AN/FPS-26 were placed in operation along with the AN/MPS-14 radars. During 1962 Fort Fisher AFS joined the Semi Automatic Ground Environment (SAGE) system, initially feeding data to DC-04 at Fort Lee AFS, Virginia. After joining, the squadron was redesignated as the 701st Radar Squadron (SAGE) on 1 July 1962. The radar squadron provided information 24/7 the SAGE Direction Center where it was analyzed to determine range, direction altitude speed and whether or not aircraft were friendly or hostile.

On 31 July 1963, the site was redesignated as NORAD ID Z-115. The station was supported logistically by nearby Myrtle Beach Air Force Base South Carolina.

==== SLBM surveillance ====
The Fort Fisher AFS AN/FPS-26 radar was converted to an Avco AN/FSS-7 SLBM Detection Radar that was operated by Detachment 5, 14th Missile Warning Squadron, Fourteenth Aerospace Force as part of the Avco 474N SLBM Detection and Warning System that "became operational in Mid-1972". In addition to the main facility, Fort Fisher AFS operated several unmanned Gap Filler sites:

- Myrtle Beach, SC (M-115A/Z-115A): 33°46′11″N 078°47′20″W
- Fort Bragg, NC (M-115B/Z-115B): 35°08′42″N 079°04′14″W

Myrtle Beach operated an AN/FPS-14, while Fort Bragg operated an AN/FPS-18. In addition, with the closure of ADC facilities at MCAS Cherry Point (M-116), the AN/FPS-14 Gap Filler at Holly Ridge, NC 34°30′50″N 077°32′08″W was redesignated Z-115C in 1963.

The first BUIC III site (with AN/GYK-19) in Air Defense Command was at Fort Fisher AFS.

The 701st Radar Squadron (SAGE) was inactivated and replaced by the 701st Air Defense Group in March 1970 Just before inactivation, the squadron earned an Air Force Outstanding Unit Award for exceptionally meritorious service for the period from 1 December 1968 through 28 February 1970. The upgrade to group status was done because of Fort Fisher AFS' status as a Backup Interceptor Control (BUIC) site. BUIC sites were alternate control sites in the event that SAGE Direction Centers became disabled and unable to control interceptor aircraft. The group was inactivated and replaced by 701st Radar Squadron (SAGE) in January 1974. in reductions to defenses against manned bombers. The group and squadron shared a second AF Outstanding Unit Award for the period 1 January 1973 through 31 December 1974.

Fort Fisher AFS came under Tactical Air Command jurisdiction in 1979 with the inactivation of Aerospace Defense Command and the creation of ADTAC.

The "Fuzzy-7" was deactivated after the Raytheon AN/FPS-115 PAVE PAWS Radar at Robins Air Force Base was completed on 5 June 1986, and the base closed on 30 June 1988, and the USAF retained the housing complex and converted it into the Fort Fisher Air Force Recreation Area which transferred to Seymour Johnson Air Force Base when Myrtle Beach AFB closed in 1993.

=== FAA facility ===
Ground Equipment Facility J-02 continued use of the USAF radar in the Joint Surveillance System (JSS), and "in 1995 an AN/FPS-91A performed search duties." A portion of the base was returned to the state of North Carolina which turned much of it into the Fort Fisher State Recreation Area and historic site.

The Fort Fisher site is used by the National Guard as a training area and also hosts the Annual Seafood, Blues and Jazz Festival.

==== Air Force units and assignments ====
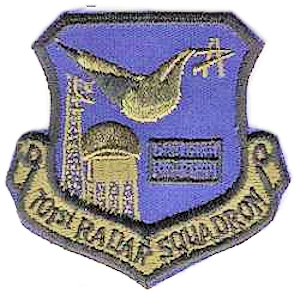
Emblem of the 701st Radar Squadron (Subdued emblem version)

==== Units ====
Squadron

- Constituted as 701st Aircraft Control and Warning Squadron

Activated 1 December 1953 at Dobbins Air Force Base (M-87), GA (not manned or equipped)
Moved to Fort Fisher AFS on 1 August 1955
Redesignated 701st Radar Squadron (SAGE), 1 July 1962
Inactivated on 1 March 1970
Redesignated 701st Radar Squadron on 1 January 1974
Activated on 17 January 1974
Inactivated on 30 June 1988

Group

- Constituted as 701st Air Defense Group on 13 February 1970

Activated on 1 Mar 1970
Inactivated on 17 Jan 1974
Disbanded on 27 September 1984

==== Assignments ====
- 35th Air Division, 1 December 1953
- 85th Air Division, 1 March 1956
- 35th Air Division, 1 September 1958
- Washington Air Defense Sector, 1 July 1961
- 33d Air Division, 1 April 1966
- 20th Air Division, 19 November 1969
- 23d Air Division, 1 March 1983
- Southeast Air Defense Sector, 1 July 1987 – 30 June 1988

==== Awards ====
Award streamer	Award	Dates	Notes
	Air Force Outstanding Unit Award	1 October 1962-31 December 1963	701st Radar Squadron
	Air Force Outstanding Unit Award	1 December 1968-28 February 1970	701st Radar Squadron
	Air Force Outstanding Unit Award	17 January 1974-31 December 1974	701st Radar Squadron
	Air Force Outstanding Unit Award	1 January 1973-17 January 1974	701st Air Defense Group

== See also ==
- List of USAF Aerospace Defense Command General Surveillance Radar Stations
- List of United States Air Force aircraft control and warning squadrons
