= Roanoke Rapids Air Force Station =

Roanoke Rapids Air Force Station
- Part of Air Defense Command (ADC)

Site information
- Type: Air Force Station
- Controlled by: United States Air Force

Location
- Location of Roanoke Rapids AFS, North Carolina
- Coordinates: 36°26′23″N 077°43′31″W

Site history
- Built: 1956
- In use: 1956-1978

Garrison information
- Garrison: 632d Aircraft Control and Warning (later Radar) Squadron

Roanoke Rapids Air Force Station (ADC ID: M-117 NORAD ID: Z-117) was a United States Air Force General Surveillance Radar station. It is 6.1 miles (9.8 km) southwest of Gaston, North Carolina, near the closed Halifax County Airport. It was closed in 1978.

== History ==
Roanoke Rapids AFS was established in 1954 by Air Defense Command as one of a planned deployment of forty-four mobile radar stations to support the permanent ADC Radar network in the United States sited around the perimeter of the country. This deployment was projected to be operational by mid-1952. Funding, constant site changes, construction, and equipment delivery delayed deployment.

This site became operational on 1 March 1956 when the 632d Aircraft Control and Warning Squadron was assigned and began operating AN/MPS-11 and AN/TPS-10D radars, and initially the station functioned as a Ground-Control Intercept (GCI) and warning station. As a GCI station, the squadron's role was to guide interceptor aircraft toward unidentified intruders picked up on the unit's radar scopes. Two years later, the AN/TPS-10D was replaced with a pair of AN/FPS-6 height-finder radars.

The R-16 Ground Air Transmitting Receiving (GATR) Site for communications was located at 34°45′33″N 076°51′20″W, approximately 126 miles south-southeast of the main site. It was originally established for the 614th AC&W Squadron at Cherry Point MCAS (Z-117). Normally the GATR site was connected by a pair of buried telephone cables, with a backup connection of dual telephone cables overhead. The Coordinate Data Transmitting Set (CDTS) (AN/FST-2) at the main site converted each radar return into a digital word which was transmitted by the GATR via microwave to the Control Center. After Roanoke Rapids AFS was inactivated, R-16 was used by OL-AA, 701st Radar Squadron at Fort Fisher AFS, North Carolina. (Z-115)

During 1959, Roanoke Rapids AFS joined the Semi Automatic Ground Environment (SAGE) system, initially feeding data to DC-04 at Fort Lee AFS, Virginia. After joining, the squadron was re-designated as the 632d Radar Squadron (SAGE) on 1 October 1959. The radar squadron provided information 24/7 to the SAGE Direction Center where it was analyzed to determine range, direction altitude speed and whether or not aircraft were friendly or hostile. On 31 July 1963, the site was redesignated as NORAD ID Z-117. In 1966 an AN/FPS-27 was performing search duties at this site.

In addition to the main facility, Roanoke Rapids AFS operated two AN/FPS-14 unmanned Gap Filler sites near the Atlantic coast:

- Elizabeth City, NC (M-117B/Z-117B): 36°14′46″N 076°15′20″W

Assigned from Cape Charles AFS, VA (P-56) in September 1957.

- Engelhard, NC (M-117D/Z-117D): 35°29′49″N 076°00′34″W

Reassigned from Cherry Point AFS (Z-116) after site was closed 1 August 1963.

Over the years, the equipment at the station was upgraded or modified to improve the efficiency and accuracy of the information gathered by the radars. The 632d was inactivated on 30 September 1978 as part of a general reduction of Aerospace Defense Command air defense units.

Today the site is abandoned with deteriorating buildings. Two radar towers remain in poor condition. The housing area is in use by private individuals. The Gap Filler support buildings remain, however the radar towers were dismantled and removed.

== Air Force units and assignments ==
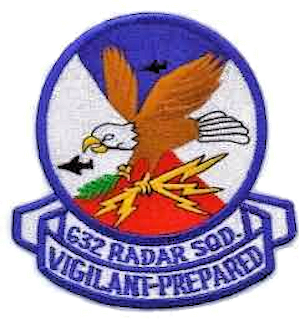
Emblem of the 632d Radar Squadron

Units:

- 632d Aircraft Warning and Control Squadron, Assigned 1 March 1956

Reactivated at Dobbins AFB (M-111), GA on 20 May 1953 (not equipped or manned)

Redesignated 632d Radar Squadron (SAGE), 1 October 1959
Redesignated: 623d Radar Squadron, 1 February 1974
Inactivated on 30 September 1978

Assignments:

- 35th Air Division, 20 May 1953
- 85th Air Division, 1 March 1956
- Washington Air Defense Sector, 1 September 1958
- 33d Air Division, 1 April 1966
- 20th Air Division, 19 November 1969
- 20th ADCOM Region, 8 December 1978 – 30 September 1978

== See also ==
- List of USAF Aerospace Defense Command General Surveillance Radar Stations
