= Winston-Salem Air Force Station =

Closed United States Air Force General Surveillance Radar station in North Carolina

Winston-Salem Air Force Station
- Part of Air Defense Command (ADC)

Site information
- Type: Air Force Station
- Controlled by: United States Air Force

Location
- Location of Winston-Salem AFS, North Carolina
- Coordinates: 36°02′30″N 080°08′18″W

Site history
- Built: 1956
- In use: 1956-1970

Garrison information
- Garrison: 810th Aircraft Control and Warning (later Radar) Squadron

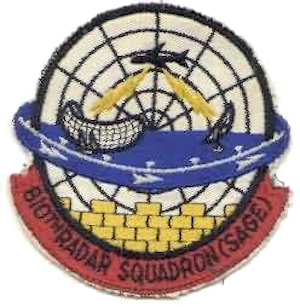
Emblem of the 810th Radar Squadron

Winston-Salem Air Force Station (ADC ID: M-130 NORAD ID: Z-130) is a closed United States Air Force General Surveillance Radar station that was active from 1956 to 1970. It is located 1 mile (1.6 km) southeast of Winston-Salem, North Carolina.

== History ==
Winston-Salem AFS was established in 1954 by Air Defense Command as one of a planned deployment of forty-four Mobile radar stations to support the permanent ADC Radar network in the United States sited around the perimeter of the country. This deployment was projected to be operational by mid-1952. Funding, constant site changes, construction, and equipment delivery delayed deployment.

This site became operational on 1 December 1956 when the 810th Aircraft Control and Warning Squadron was assigned to Winston-Salem AFS with AN/MPS-11 and AN/FPS-6A radars, and initially the station functioned as a Ground-Control Intercept (GCI) and warning station. As a GCI station, the squadron's role was to guide interceptor aircraft toward unidentified intruders picked up on the unit's radar scopes. The AN/MPS-11 set was replaced by an AN/FPS-8 radar that saw service between 1960 and 1962. In 1962 the 810th began operating AN/FPS-24 search and AN/FPS-26 height-finder radars along with the previously installed AN/FPS-6 set.

During 1962 Winston-Salem AFS joined the Semi Automatic Ground Environment (SAGE) system, initially feeding data to DC-04 at Fort Lee AFS, Virginia. After joining, the squadron was redesignated as the 810th Radar Squadron (SAGE) on 1 March 1962. The radar squadron provided information 24/7 the SAGE Direction Center where it was analyzed to determine range, direction altitude speed and whether or not aircraft were friendly or hostile. On 31 July 1963, the site was redesignated as NORAD ID Z-130. The AN/FPS-6A was retired in 1968.

In addition to the main facility, Winston-Salem AFS operated an AN/FPS-18 unmanned Gap Filler site:

- Allen, NC (M-130B/Z-130B): 35°13′31″N 080°38′07″W

The 810th was inactivated on 31 July 1970 as part of a general reduction of Aerospace Defense Command air defense units.

Today some former USAF buildings now used as part of a light industrial complex. The large AN/FPS-24 tower still stands, as well as most of the support buildings and barracks. The housing area is in private hands. Some of the buildings are used by ARCA Addiction Recovery Care Association and Google offers an excellent view at https://www.google.com/maps?q=1931+Union+Cross+Road+Winston+Salem,+NC+27107&hl=en&ll=36.044363,-80.136168&spn=0.002622,0.004128&sll=35.225278,-80.635278&sspn=0.006591,0.011576&t=h&hnear=1931+Union+Cross+Rd,+Winston-Salem,+Forsyth,+North+Carolina+27107&z=19 where the radar building can be seen clearly without the radar that was once on top of the structure. During the late 1960s the base was visited by both Club and Boy Scout troops as part of a Merit Badge exercise.

== Air Force units and assignments ==
=== Units ===
- Constituted as the 810th Aircraft Control and Warning Squadron

Activated at Dobbins AFB (M-111), GA on 20 June 1953 (not equipped or manned)
Moved to Andrews AFB (SM-171), MD on 1 July 1956 (not equipped or manned)
Moved to Winston-Salem AFS on 1 December 1956
Redesignated as 810th Radar Squadron (SAGE) on 1 March 1962
Inactivated on 31 July 1970

=== Assignments ===
- 85th Air Division, 1 July 1956
- 35th Air Division, 1 September 1958
- 32d Air Division, 15 November 1958
- Washington Air Defense Sector, 1 July 1961
- 33d Air Division, 1 April 1966
- 20th Air Division, 19 November 1969 – 31 July 1970

== See also ==
- List of USAF Aerospace Defense Command General Surveillance Radar Stations
