= Manassas Air Force Station =

Manassas Air Force Station
- Part of Air Defense Command (ADC)

Site information
- Type: Air Force Station
- Controlled by: United States Air Force

Location
- Location of Manassas AFS, Virginia
- Coordinates: 38°37′40″N 077°26′18″W

Site history
- Built: 1952
- In use: 1952-1965

Garrison information
- Garrison: 647th Aircraft Control and Warning (later Radar) Squadron

Manassas Air Force Station (ADC ID: P-55 NORAD ID: Z-55) is a closed United States Air Force General Surveillance Radar station. It is located 7.4 miles (11.9 km) west of Dale City, Virginia. It was closed in 1965.

== History ==
Manassas AFS was established as one of twenty-eight stations built as part of the second segment of the permanent Air Defense Command radar network. Prompted by the start of the Korean War, on 11 July 1950, the Secretary of the Air Force asked the Secretary of Defense for approval to expedite construction of the second segment of the permanent network. Receiving the Defense Secretary's approval on 21 July, the Air Force directed the Corps of Engineers to proceed with construction.

The 647th Aircraft Control and Warning Squadron began operating AN/FPS-3 and AN/CPS-4 radars at what was initially designated Quantico in March 1952, due to it being situated at the northeast corner of the Quantico Marine Corps Base. It assumed coverage from the temporary "Lashup" site L-14 at Fort Meade, Maryland in 1955, and initially the station functioned as a Ground-Control Intercept (GCI) and warning station. As a GCI station, the squadron's role was to guide interceptor aircraft toward unidentified intruders picked up on the unit's radar scopes. The AN/FPS-3 remained active until 1962. In July 1957, the name of the station was officially changed to Manassas Air Force Station.

In 1958 AN/FPS-6A and AN/FPS-6B radars took over height-finder chores. During 1959 Manassas AFS joined the Semi Automatic Ground Environment (SAGE) system, initially feeding data to DC-04 at Fort Lee AFS, Virginia. After joining, the squadron was re-designated as the 647th Radar Squadron (SAGE) on 1 October 1959. The radar squadron provided information 24/7 to the SAGE Direction Center where it was analyzed to determine range, direction altitude speed and whether or not aircraft were friendly or hostile.

Manassas AFS was upgraded to an AN/FPS-35 radar in 1961, but problems prevented operations. It became operational in 1962, and was tested to determine if it could detect missile launchings. The radar detected Polaris and Minuteman missile launches from Cape Canaveral on 28 June 1962. Additional tests revealed the AN/FPS-35 radar had marginal value for missile detection. The AN/FPS-3 was then retired. In 1963 an AN/FPS-26A replaced the AN/FPS-6A height-finder radar. On 31 July 1963, the site was redesignated as NORAD ID Z-55.

In addition to the main facility, Manassas operated several unmanned AN/FPS-14 Gap Filler sites

- Hermanville, MD (P-55B): 38°13′40″N 076°24′33″W

When Manassas AFS closed, the site became an annex of Fort Meade, MD and was redesignated "RP-54A".

- Hanover, PA (RP-55D): 39°51′28″N 076°56′52″W

Reassigned to Fort Meade, MD in December, 1960 and was redesignated "RP-54B".

- Thomas, WV (P-55F): 39°08′50″N 079°34′16″W

When Manassas AFS closed, the site became an annex of Oakdale AI, PA and was redesignated "RP-62G".

The site was removed from service on 25 June 1965. Reportedly, the FPS-35 radar sail was then sent to Fortuna AFS, North Dakota, to replace the one there which had been destroyed in a fierce wind storm a year earlier. The Manassas GATR site at Independent Hill, VA 38°37′35″N 077°27′20″W was retained as site R-20 and manned by the 770th AC&W Squadron, Operating Location "A", and continued in operation until 1976.

Today, the former Manassas Air Force Station is an administrative and logistics center for the Prince William County School District. The area remains fenced and many of the former Air Force buildings are in use, along with the housing area. The large AN/FPS-35 search radar tower remains, as well as the foundations for the other towers, although the towers themselves were removed several years ago.

== Air Force units and assignments ==
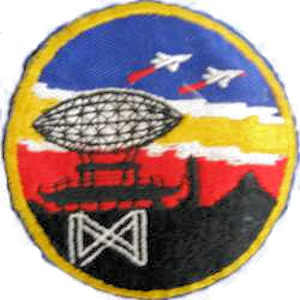
Emblem of the 647th Radar Squadron

Units:

- 647th Aircraft Control and Warning Squadron

Activated on 30 April 1948 at Camp Kilmer, New Jersey
Moved later that year to Roslyn AFS, New York
Moved to Grenier Field, New Hampshire in March 1949
Moved to Gravelly Point, Arlington, Virginia on 1 January 1950 (not manned or equipped)
Moved to Fort George G. Meade, Maryland, 1 January 1951 (not manned or equipped)
Moved to Quantico, Virginia on 1 April 1952
Station redesignated Manassas AFS, VA, 1 July 1957
Redesignated as 647th Radar Squadron (SAGE), 1 October 1959
Discontinued and inactivated 25 June 1965.

Assignments:

- 503d Aircraft Control and Warning Group, 30 April 1948
- 26th Air Division, 6 February 1952
- 4710th Defense Wing, 16 February 1953
- 85th Air Division, 1 March 1956
- Washington Air Defense Sector, 1 September 1958 – 25 June 1965

== See also ==
- List of USAF Aerospace Defense Command General Surveillance Radar Stations
