= GE 477L Nuclear Detection and Reporting System =

US Cold War system

The GE 477L Nuclear Detection and Reporting System (NUDETS, NUDETS 477L, Program 477L) was a Cold War "Nuclear Detonation and Radioactive Fall-out Reporting System" for the National Military Command System. Planning/development began "by September 1, 1959, when NORAD had taken over responsibility from CONAD." In February 1961, General Electric and the sensor subcontractor Dresser agreed on a "team proposal" to the USAF. GE's oral proposal to the USAF was on October 18 1961, and in early November the GE/Dresser team was selected from 13 proposals. The contract was completed February 5 1962; specifications were approved June 1962; and the "target cost" and "target fee" amounts were $1,709,755 and $95,000. Lt Col Elmer Jones was the program chief at the System Program Office.

== Deuces Wild/Thirsty Camel ==
Phase I of NUDETS deployed under the code names Deuces Wild and Thirsty Camel and was a prototype system "in operation in the Baltimore/Washington, D.C. area and reported data to the NORAD COC for about 20 months (l July 1964 to 27 February 1966)--Chidlaw Building Combined Operations Center in Colorado Springs until Cheyenne Mountain Complex became operational in 1965-6. The "regional data processing center" was at Benton Air Force Station, and the sensors were at sensors located at Benton; Thomas, West Virginia; Manassas, Virginia, and Hermanville, Maryland (RP-54A/Z-227A, 38°13′40″N 076°24′33″W). Phase I testing "showed that the data it gave was not reliable" and by May 1965, NUDETS was planned to be cancelled. NUDETS was combined with the Army's Improved Biological and Chemical Detection Warning System to form the NORAD Nuclear Biological Chemical (NBC) Warning and Reporting System effective 1 January 1966 by NORAD Operation Order 303N-66, 26 November 1965.
