= North Charleston Air Force Station =

Closed United States Air Force General Surveillance Radar station

North Charleston Air Force Station
- Part of Air Defense Command (ADC)

Site information
- Type: Air Force Station
- Controlled by: United States Air Force

Location
- Location of North Charleston AFS, South Carolina
- Coordinates: 32°53′44″N 080°01′20″W

Site history
- Built: 1955
- In use: 1955-1980

Garrison information
- Garrison: 792d Aircraft Control and Warning (later Radar) Squadron

North Charleston Air Force Station (ADC ID: M-113 NORAD ID: Z-113) is a closed United States Air Force General Surveillance Radar station. It is located in the City of North Charleston, South Carolina. It was closed in 1980.

== History ==
North Charleston AFS was established in 1954 by Air Defense Command as one of a planned deployment of forty-four Mobile radar stations to support the permanent ADC Radar network in the United States sited around the perimeter of the country. This deployment was projected to be operational by mid-1952. Funding, constant site changes, construction, and equipment delivery delayed deployment.

This site became operational on 1 June 1955 when the 792d Aircraft Control and Warning Squadron activated an AN/MPS-7 radar at the site, designated M-113. Logistical support for the radar site was provided by the adjacent MATS Charleston AFB, and initially the station functioned as a Ground-Control Intercept (GCI) and warning station. As a GCI station, the squadron's role was to guide interceptor aircraft toward unidentified intruders picked up on the unit's radar scopes.

By 1956 operational radars included the AN/MPS-7, AN/GPS-3, AN/MPS-14, and AN/MPS-8 sets. In late 1959 this site was also performing air traffic control duties for the FAA with a newly installed AN/FPS-20A search radar and AN/MPS-14 set.

In 1961 the search radar was upgraded and redesignated as an AN/FPS-66 and an AN/FPS-26 height-finder radar was installed. During 1962 North Charleston AFS joined the Semi Automatic Ground Environment (SAGE) system, initially feeding data to DC-04 at Fort Lee AFS, Virginia. After joining, the squadron was redesignated as the 792d Radar Squadron (SAGE) on 25 March 1962. The radar squadron provided information 24/7 the SAGE Direction Center where it was analyzed to determine range, direction altitude speed and whether or not aircraft were friendly or hostile. On 31 July 1963, the site was redesignated as NORAD ID Z-113. By 1966 the site was operating an AN/FPS-27.

In addition to the main facility, Fort Fisher AFS operated several unmanned Gap Filler sites:

- Stateburg, SC (M-113A/Z-113A): 33°56′37″N 080°31′21″W
- Georgetown SC (M-113B/Z-113B): 33°18′57″N 079°19′26″W
- Parris Island MCAS SC (M-113C/Z-113C): 32°13′42″N 080°42′21″W

The sites at Statesburg and Georgetown were opened in 1959 AN/FPS-14 radars, Parris Island was taken over from the closed site (M-112) at Hunter AFB, Georgia in December 1961 and was an AN/FPS-18. All the Gap Fillers were closed in June 1970.

Over the years, the equipment at the station was upgraded or modified to improve the efficiency and accuracy of the information gathered by the radars. The facility came under Tactical Air Command jurisdiction in 1979 with the inactivation of Aerospace Defense Command and the activation of ADTAC. North Charleston AFS was closed on 4 June 1980.

In 1980 the Air Force built a height-finder tower at Jedburg, SC, an FAA site located twenty-two miles northwest of Charleston and closed North Charleston AFB. The North Charleston GATR (Ground Air Transmitter Receiver) site (R-113), operated by the 1968th Communications Squadron remained open temporarily after the parent radar sited closed.

Today North Charleston Air Force Station has been mostly torn down. Some former AF buildings are now used as government offices for the city of North Charleston. The large support buildings for the FPS-27, FPS-26 and FPS-66 radars remain. The former housing units used for low-income housing. Also the site hosts a local Marine Corps Reserve Training Center. The Gap Filler at Parris Island is now part of a golf course; the one at Georgetown County Airport has been redeveloped; the Stateburg site remains, with an existing radome .

== Air Force units and assignments ==
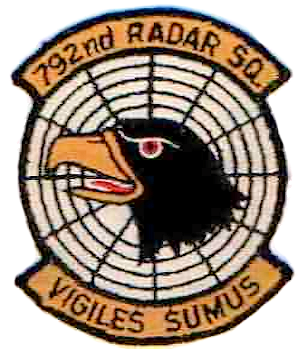
Emblem of the 792d Radar Squadron

=== Units ===
- Constituted as the 792d Aircraft Control and Warning Squadron

Activated at Tinker AFB, OK on 16 March 1951
Inactivated on 4 June 1951 (not manned or equipped)
Activated at Ethan Allen AFB (L-3), VT on 1 November 1953. (not manned or equipped)
Moved to Dobbins AFB, GA (M-87) on 24 December 1953 (not manned or equipped)
Moved to Charleston AFB, SC on 1 October 1954 (not manned or equipped)
Moved to North Charleston Air Force Station on 1 June 1955
Redesignated as 792d Radar Squadron (SAGE) on 25 March 1962
Redesignated as 792d Radar Squadron on 1 July 1974
Inactivated on 4 June 1980

=== Assignments ===
- 546th Aircraft Control and Warning Group, 16 March 1951 – 4 June 1951
- 32d Air Division, 1 November 1953
- 35th Air Division, 24 December 1953
- 32d Air Division, 15 November 1958
- Washington Air Defense Sector, 1 July 1961
- 33d Air Division, 1 April 1966
- 20th Air Division, 19 November 1969 – 4 June 1980

== See also ==
- List of USAF Aerospace Defense Command General Surveillance Radar Stations
