= Bedford Air Force Station =

Former US Air Force radar station

Bedford Air Force Station
- Part of Air Defense Command (ADC)

Site information
- Type: Air Force Station
- Code: ADC ID: M-121, NORAD ID: Z-121
- Controlled by: United States Air Force

Location
- Location of Bedford AFS, Virginia
- Coordinates: 37°31′02″N 079°30′37″W

Site history
- Built: 1954
- In use: 1954-1975

Garrison information
- Garrison: 649th Aircraft Control and Warning (later Radar) Squadron

Bedford Air Force Station is a closed United States Air Force General Surveillance Radar station. It is located 12.7 miles (20.4 km) north of Bedford, Virginia. It was closed in 1975.

== History ==
Bedford AFS was established by Air Defense Command in 1954 as part of a planned deployment of forty-four Phase I Mobile Radar stations. It was one of twenty-nine stations which were sited around the perimeter of the country to support the permanent ADC network of seventy-five stations. The deployment had been projected to be operational by mid-1952. Funding, constant site changes, construction, and equipment delivery delayed deployment

The 649th Airborne Control and Warning Squadron achieved beneficial occupancy by 1 December 1954. Operational status was achieved in 1956 with the activation of the AN/MPS-8 and AN/MPS-11 radars, and initially the station functioned as a Ground-Control Intercept (GCI) and warning station. As a GCI station, the squadron's role was to guide interceptor aircraft toward unidentified intruders picked up on the unit's radar scopes.

By 1958 the AN/MPS-8 had been superseded by a pair of AN/FPS-6 height-finder radars. In 1959 an AN/FPS-20A search radar replaced the AN/MPS-11 set. During 1959 Bedford AFB joined the Semi Automatic Ground Environment (SAGE) system, initially feeding data to DC-04 at Fort Lee AFS, Virginia. After joining, the squadron was re-designated as the 649th Radar Squadron (SAGE) on 1 October 1959. The radar squadron provided information 24/7 the SAGE Direction Center where it was analyzed to determine range, direction altitude speed and whether or not aircraft were friendly or hostile.

In 1960 this site also began performing air traffic control duties for the FAA. In 1963 the search radar was upgraded and redesignated as an AN/FPS-67. On 31 July 1963, the site was redesignated as NORAD ID Z-121.

Over the years, the equipment at the station was upgraded or modified to improve the efficiency and accuracy of the information gathered by the radars. The 649th was inactivated and the Air Force closed the facility on 30 June 1975. Afterward the FAA took over the facility, and today it is an active Joint Surveillance System (JSS) site, now operating an ARSR-3 Long Range Air Route Surveillance Radar. Most of the buildings on the site have been torn down, the housing and GATR site have been obliterated as well.

== Air Force units and assignments ==
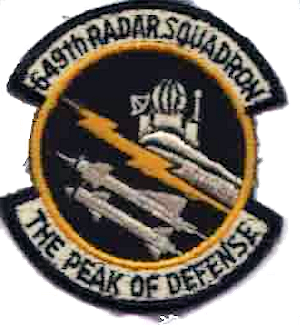
Emblem of the 649th Radar Squadron

Units:

- 649th Aircraft Control and Warning Squadron, Assigned 1 December 1954

Activated as 649th Aircraft Control Squadron at Orlando AFB, Florida on 20 November 1948
Moved to Roslyn, New York ca. 1 April 1949
Inactivated 1 October 1949
Redesignated 649th Aircraft Control and Warning Squadron
Activated at Roslyn (later Roslyn AFS), NY, on 26 May 1953 (not manned or equipped)
Redesignated 649th Radar Squadron (SAGE), on 1 October 1959
Redesignated 649th Radar Squadron, on 1 February 1974
Inactivated on 30 June 1975

Assignments:

- 539th Aircraft Control & Warning Group, 20 November 1948
- 503rd Aircraft Control & Warning Group, ca. 1 Apr 1949 – 1 October 1949
- 26th Air Division, 26 May 1953
- 4710th Defense Wing, 1 May 1954
- 85th Air Division, 1 March 1956
- Washington Air Defense Sector, 1 September 1958
- 33d Air Division, 1 April 1966
- 20th Air Division, 19 November 1969 – 30 June 1975

== See also ==
- List of USAF Aerospace Defense Command General Surveillance Radar Stations
