= 503rd Aircraft Control and Warning Group =

503d Aircraft Control and Warning Group
- Active: 1949-52
- Country: United States
- Branch: United States Air Force
- Type: Air Defense Warning and Control
- Part of: Air Defense Command; First Air Force; 26th Air Division

The 503d Aircraft Control and Warning Group (AC&WG) is an inactive United States Air Force unit. Its last assignment was with Air Defense Command (ADC)'s 26th Air Division at Roslyn AFS New York. It was inactivated in 1952.

== History ==
Activated as an ADC Aircraft Control and Warning Group, forming radar squadrons in the late 1940s and the early 1950s and deploying them around the New York, New Jersey area under First Air Force and the 26th Air Division. On 16 April 1950, the reserve 563d Aircraft Control and Warning Group was activated as a Corollary unit at Roslyn, sharing the 503d's equipment and facilities. The 563d was called to active duty on 2 June 1951 and was inactivated, with its personnel used as fillers for the 503d.

=== Lineage ===
- Constituted as the 503d Aircraft Warning Group, 1 April 1948
- Activated on 1 April 1948

Redesignated 503d Aircraft Control and Warning Group, 6 December 1949
Inactivated on 6 February 1952
Disbanded on 21 September 1984.

=== Assignments ===
- 26th Air Division, 16 November 1948 – 6 February 1952

=== Components ===
- 645th Aircraft Control and Warning Squadron

Mitchel Field, New York, 30 April 1948 – 1 January 1951

- 646th Aircraft Control and Warning Squadron

Highlands AFS, New Jersey, 1 June 1948 – 6 February 1952

- 647th Aircraft Control and Warning Squadron

Fort George G. Meade, Maryland, 1 January 1951 – 6 February 1952

- 648th Aircraft Control and Warning Squadron

Mud Pond, Pennsylvania, 1 January 1951 – 6 February 1952

- 658th Aircraft Control and Warning Squadron

Santini, New York, 1 January 1951 – 6 February 1952

- 770th Aircraft Warning and Control Squadron

Palermo AFS, New Jersey, 1 January 1951 – 6 February 1952

- 771st Aircraft Control and Warning Squadron

Cape Charles AFS, Virginia, 1 January 1951 – 6 February 1952

- 772d Aircraft Control and Warning Squadron

Connellsville, Pennsylvania, 1 January 1951 – 6 February 1952

- 773d Aircraft Control and Warning Squadron

Camp Hero, New York, 1 June 1948 – 6 December 1949

=== Stations ===
- Fort Slocum (later, Slocum AFB), 1 April 1948
- Roslyn AFS, New York, 1 January 1951 – 6 February 1952

== See also ==
- List of USAF Aerospace Defense Command General Surveillance Radar Stations
- Aerospace Defense Command Fighter Squadrons
- List of United States Air Force aircraft control and warning squadrons
