= Naval Air Station Hutchinson =

Coordinates: 37°55′37″N 97°54′29″W

Naval Air Station Hutchinson, Kansas, is a former facility of the United States Navy, located 13 miles south of Hutchinson, Kansas, which was constructed during World War II, and reopened for several years in the 1950s before final closure in 1958. The base was then taken over by the Kansas Air National Guard.

== History ==
That which was initially designated Naval Reserve Aviation Base Hutchinson was created from July 1942 on farm land previously owned by the Amish. The 2,565-acre tract was purchased at $115 an acre, well above the usual $75-$100 of the time. Allowing the enterprising Amish to salvage and move their buildings served to save the Navy some $20,000 in dismantling fees.

The partially completed facility was commissioned NRAB Hutchinson on 27 October 1942 and the first cadets arrived the following month. Flight training began three months ahead of schedule.

On 1 January 1943, the Navy redesignated it Naval Air Station Hutchinson, although only 55 N2S Stearmans were on board at that time. By June there were 185 Stearmans and at the station's zenith at the end of the year, the ramps held 303 trainers. Shortly thereafter, the station was selected for termination of flight training.

From March 1944 until station closure in October 1946, Operation Training Unit VB-4 #1 operated with Consolidated PB4Y-1s and later PB4Y-2s.

=== Post-war ===
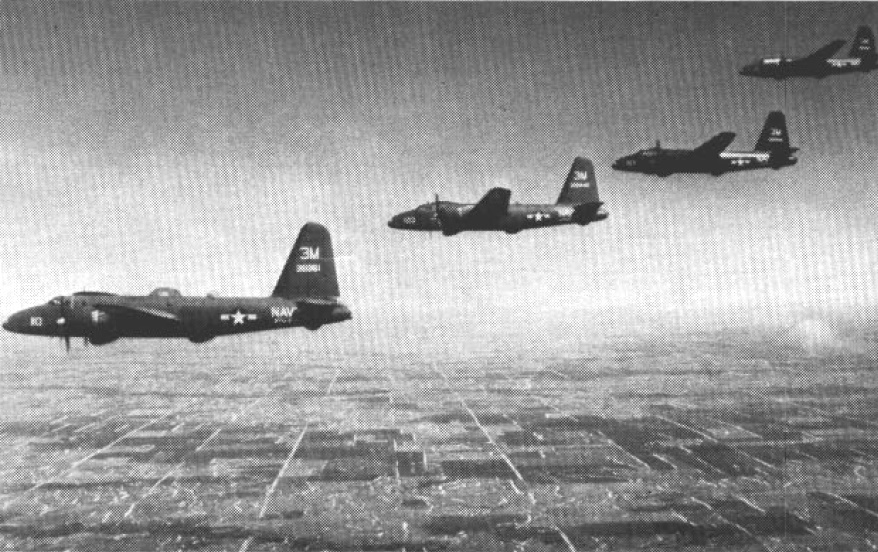
NAS Hutchinson Lockheed P2V Neptunes over Kansas, circa 1957.

Following World War II, the station fell into disrepair. The hangars were used for grain storage by local farmers, and a civilian leased the former recreation building as a roller rink. The onset of the Korean War necessitated reopening the base to relieve congestion at NAS Corpus Christi. On 25 April 1952, a Navy contingent of 1,200 men arrived to reactivate the base.

"During September, advanced multi-engine training commenced with PB4Y-2s and SNBs. Ultimately, the Advance Training Units 604 and 614 operated over 100 S2F Grumman Trackers and Lockheed P2V Neptunes with a total station personnel of 2,200. Hutchinson fell victim to the cuts of Naval Aviation in 1958 and the station closed for the final time on June 30."

Subsequently, the facility passed to the Kansas Air National Guard. and the U.S. Air Force as Hutchinson Air Force Station.

== See also ==
- Naval Air Station Olathe
