= 770th Radar Squadron =

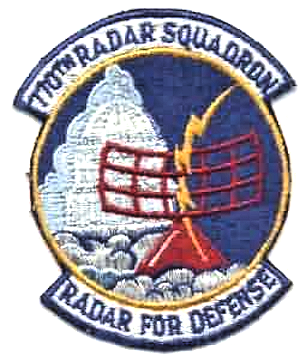
- Emblem of the 770th Radar Squadron
- Active: 1950-1979
- Country: United States
- Branch: United States Air Force
- Type: General Radar Surveillance

The 770th Radar Squadron is an inactive United States Air Force unit. It was last assigned to the 20th Air Division, Aerospace Defense Command, stationed at Fort George G. Meade, Maryland. It was inactivated on 1 January 1980.

The unit was a General Surveillance Radar squadron providing for the air defense of the United States.

== Lineage ==
- Constituted as the 770th Aircraft Warning and Control Squadron on 14 November 1950

Activated on 27 November 1950
Redesignated as the 770th Radar Squadron (SAGE) on 1 October 1958
Redesignated as the 770th Radar Squadron on 1 February 1974
Inactivated on 1 January 1980

== Assignments ==
- 503d Aircraft Control and Warning Group, 1 January 1951
- 26th Air Division, 6 February 1952
- 4710th Defense Wing, 16 February 1953
- 4709th Air Defense Wing, 1 March 1956
- 26th Air Division, 18 October 1956
- New York Air Defense Sector, 8 January 1957
- Washington Air Defense Sector, 1 October 1961
- 33d Air Division, 1 April 1966
- 20th Air Division, 19 November 1969 - 1 January 1980

== Stations ==
- Palermo AFS, New Jersey, 1 January 1951
- Fort George G. Meade, Maryland, 1 October 1961 - 1 January 1980
