= 546th Aircraft Control and Warning Group =

Inactive United States Air Force unit

546th Aircraft Control and Warning Group
- Active: 1951
- Country: United States
- Branch: United States Air Force
- Type: Command and Control
- Part of: Air Defense Command

The 546th Aircraft Control and Warning Group is an inactive United States Air Force unit. It was assigned to the 33d Air Division, stationed at Tinker Air Force Base, Oklahoma. It was inactivated on 4 June 1951.

This command and control organization activated on 19 March 1951 was responsible for the organization, manning, and equipping of new Aircraft Control and Warning (Radar) units. It was dissolved, with the units being assigned directly to the 33d AD.

Components

- 792d Aircraft Control and Warning Squadron

Tinker AFB, Oklahoma, 16 March-4 June 1951

- 793d Aircraft Control and Warning Squadron

Hutchinson AFS, Kansas, 1 May-4 June 1951

- 798th Aircraft Control and Warning Squadron

Belleville AFS, Illinois, 1 May-4 June 1951
