= Palermo Air Force Station =

Defunct American radar site in New Jersey

Palermo Air Force Station
- Part of Air Defense Command (ADC)

Site information
- Type: Air Force Station
- Controlled by: United States Air Force

Location
- Location of Palermo AFS, New Jersey
- Coordinates: 39°13′19″N 074°41′14″W

Site history
- Built: 1948
- In use: 1948–1970

Garrison information
- Garrison: 770th Aircraft Control and Warning (later Radar) Squadron (1952–1961); 680th Radar Squadron (1961–1970)

Palermo Air Force Station (ADC ID: P-54, NORAD ID: Z-54) is a closed United States Air Force (USAF) General Surveillance Radar station. It was located in Palermo, New Jersey, 4.8 miles (7.7 km) north of Sea Isle City, in Cape May County, New Jersey, United States. It was closed in 1970.

== History ==
In 1948 USAF directed Air Defense Command (ADC) to take radar sets out of storage for operation in the Northeastern United States. By August. a radar had been placed in operation at Palermo, NJ. This hasty program was appropriately named "Lashup." The AN/TPS-1B long-range search radar at Palermo (Lashup Site L-14) fed into a primitive control center established at Roslyn Air Warning Station, New York.

Prompted by the start of the Korean War, on 11 July 1950, the Secretary of the Air Force asked the Secretary of Defense for approval to expedite construction of additional stations, and it received the Defense Secretary's approval on 21 July, the Air Force directed the Army Corps of Engineers to proceed with construction of Palermo Air Force Station. The 770th Aircraft Control & Warning Squadron was activated to control the site.

Because of difficulties with new production radar equipment, Palermo AFS initially received radar equipment from the former Lashup site to expedite operational status. Thus it was designated as site LP-54, and initially the station functioned as a Ground-Control Intercept (GCI) and warning station. As a GCI station, the squadron's role was to guide interceptor aircraft toward unidentified intruders picked up on the unit's radar scopes.

In 1951 AN/CPS-5 and AN/TPS-10A height-finder radars were added to the site. By April 1952 the 770th Aircraft Control and Warning Squadron was operating AN/CPS-4 and AN/FPS-3 radars. In the spring of 1957, Palermo was one of the first to deploy an AN/FPS-20 radar. Palermo also received two AN/FPS-6 height-finder radars at this time.

During 1958 Palermo AFS joined the Semi Automatic Ground Environment (SAGE) system, initially feeding data to DC-01 at McGuire AFB, New Jersey. After joining, the squadron was redesignated as the 770th Radar Squadron (SAGE) on 1 Oct 1958. The radar squadron provided information 24/7 the SAGE Direction Center where it was analyzed to determine range, direction altitude speed and whether or not aircraft were friendly or hostile. By late 1959 this station also was performing air traffic control duties.

On 1 October 1961, the 770th Radar Squadron and the site designation (RP-54) left for Fort Meade, Maryland. The Palermo site was then operated by Detachment 1 of the New York Air Defense Sector and designated as site RP-63C. This unit was replaced by the 680th Radar Squadron in 1962 and the P-54 site designation returned to Palermo in 1963. On 31 July 1963, the site was redesignated as NORAD ID Z-54, and later the AN/FPS-20 was upgraded into an AN/FPS-65 radar. In 1968 one AN/FPS-6 height-finder radar was retired. I was stationed at Palermo from 1968 until it closed in 1970, and I worked in the "6 shop" – and both FPS-6 height finders were in operation until just before the site closed.

The 680th was inactivated and the Air Force closed the facility in May 1970. Palermo's GATR (Ground Air Transmitter Receiver) site (R-28) remained active until 1975, becoming a detachment of the 770th Radar Squadron at Fort Meade, Maryland. The housing reportedly was transferred to the U.S. Coast Guard after site closed.

For many years, the site was abandoned and overgrown, with deteriorating buildings and former radar towers dominating the site. Palermo AFS was demolished in 2003 and was redeveloped into the "Osprey Point" single-family housing development, with no evidence of the former military radar station.

== Units and Assignments ==
=== Units ===
- Constituted as the 770th Aircraft Control and Warning Squadron on 14 November 1950

Activated on 27 November 1950
Redesignated as the 770th Radar Squadron (SAGE) on 1 October 1958
Moved to Fort Meade, MD on 1 October 1961

- Organized as Detachment 1, New York Air Defense Sector on 1 October 1961

Discontinued on 1 June 1962

- 680th Aircraft Control and Warning Squadron activated at Yaak AFS, MT on 1 March 1951

Inactivated on 1 June 1960
Redesignated 680th Radar Squadron (SAGE) and activated at Palermo AFS on 1 June 1962
Inactivated on 30 May 1970

- Organized as Detachment, 770th Radar Squadron on 30 May 1970

Discontinued in 1975

=== Assignments ===
- 503d Aircraft Control and Warning Group, 27 November 1950
- 26th Air Division, 6 February 1952
- 4710th Defense Wing (later 4710th Air Defense Wing) 16 February 1953
- 4709th Air Defense Wing, 1 March 1956
- 26th Air Division, 18 October 1956
- New York Air Defense Sector, 8 January 1957
- 21st Air Division, 1 April 1966
- 35th Air Division, 1 December 1967
- 33rd Air Division, 1 April 1968
- 20th Air Division, 19 November 1969 – 1975

== See also ==
- List of United States Air Force aircraft control and warning squadrons
- United States general surveillance radar stations
