= Oakdale Air Force Station =

Oakdale Air Force Station
- Part of Air Defense Command (ADC)

Site information
- Type: Air Force Station
- Controlled by: United States Air Force

Location
- Location of Oakdale AFS, Pennsylvania
- Coordinates: 40°23′50″N 080°09′40″W

Site history
- Built: 1959
- In use: 1959 – present

Garrison information
- Garrison: 662d Radar Squadron

Oakdale Air Force Station (ADC ID: RP-62, NORAD ID: Z-62) is a United States Air Force General Surveillance Radar station. It is located 1.3 miles (2.1 km) east of the Pittsburgh suburb of Oakdale, Pennsylvania. It was closed in 1969.

== History ==
Oakdale Air Force Station was established in 1959 at the Oakdale Army Installation near Pittsburgh and activated in August 1960 with the transfer of the 662d Radar Squadron from Brookfield Air Force Station, Ohio, which was closed. Oakdale was designated RP-62, reflecting the replacement (R) of P-62 site at Brookfield. The move of the 662d Radar Squadron was part of a consolidation of Army and Air Force Radar units for budget considerations.

The United States Army had established Army Air-Defense Command Post (AADCP) P-70DC for the Nike Missile air-defense system, Pittsburgh Defense Area. The site had an FAA ARSR-lA search radar providing air-traffic-control data, as well as a pair of AN/FPS-6B height-finder radars, and initially the station functioned as a Ground-Control Intercept (GCI) and warning station. As a GCI station, the squadron's role was to guide interceptor aircraft toward unidentified intruders picked up on the unit's radar scopes.

During 1960 Oakdale AFS joined the Semi Automatic Ground Environment (SAGE) system, initially feeding data to DC-03 at Syracuse AFS, New York. After joining, the squadron was re-designated as the 662d Radar Squadron (SAGE) on 15 July 1960. The radar squadron provided information 24/7 the SAGE Direction Center where it was analyzed to determine range, direction altitude speed and whether or not aircraft were friendly or hostile.

An AN/FPS-20 search radar was installed in 1962. On 31 July 1963, the site was redesignated as NORAD ID Z-62. In 1963 this radar operated with AN/FPS-24 search radar as well as AN/FPS-26A and AN/FPS-90 height-finder radars (the Army also operated a pair of height-finder radars for a while, in support of Nike missile defense operations). The AN/FPS-20 was retired in 1966.

In addition to the main facility, Oakdale operated two unmanned AN/FPS-14 (RP-62B/G) and AN/FPS-18 (P-62A/E) Gap Filler sites

- Thompson, OH (RP-62A) 41°41′09″N 081°02′38″W
- Lewisville, OH (RP-62B) 39°45′23″N 081°13′40″W
- Brookfield, OH (RP-62E) 41°13′08″N 080°33′43″W
- Thomas, WV (RP-62G) 39°08′52″N 079°34′15″W

The Thompson and Lewisville sites, along with the former Brookfield AFS were transferred to Oakdale when Brookfield AFS was deactivated in 1960. The Thomas site was reassigned to Oakdale with the closure of Manassas AFS, VA in 1958. All Gap filler sites ere closed in June 1968.

Air Force operations ended with 662nd Radar Squadron (SAGE) inactivating on 31 December 1969. Army operations ended in 1974. The FAA retained the radar site, and replaced the AN/FPS-24 with an AN/FPS-67B search radar, still in use today on the old FPS-24 tower.

== Air Force units and assignments ==
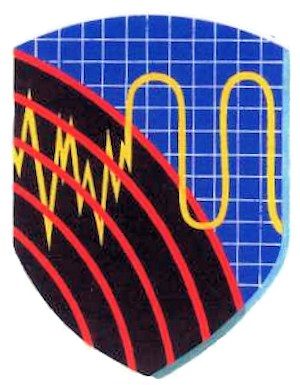
Emblem of the 662d Radar Squadron

Units:

- 662d Aircraft Control and Warning Squadron, moved from Brookfield AFS, PA on 1 November 1959.

Redesignated: 662d Radar Squadron (SAGE), 15 July 1960
Inactivated: 31 December 1969

Assignments:

- Detroit Air Defense Sector, 1 November 1959
- Syracuse Air Defense Sector, 15 June 1960
- Detroit Air Defense Sector, 4 September 1963
- 34th Air Division, 1 April 1966
- 33d Air Division, 16 September-31 December 1969

== See also ==
- List of USAF Aerospace Defense Command General Surveillance Radar Stations
- Pittsburgh Defense Area (Nike missiles)
