= Washington Air Defense Sector =

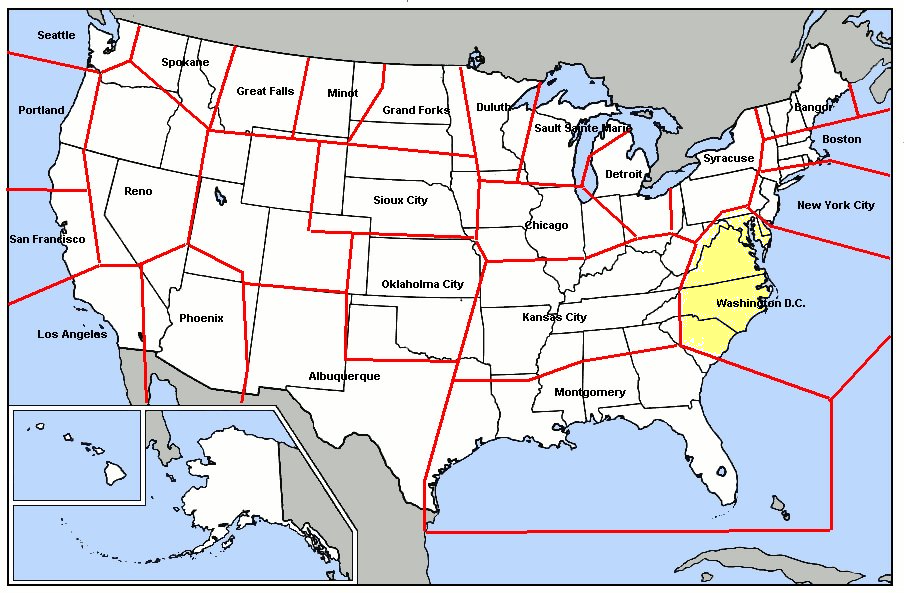
- 1958 Washington Air Defense Sector Area of Responsibility
- Active: 1956–1966
- Country: United States
- Branch: United States Air Force
- Role: Air defense

Insignia
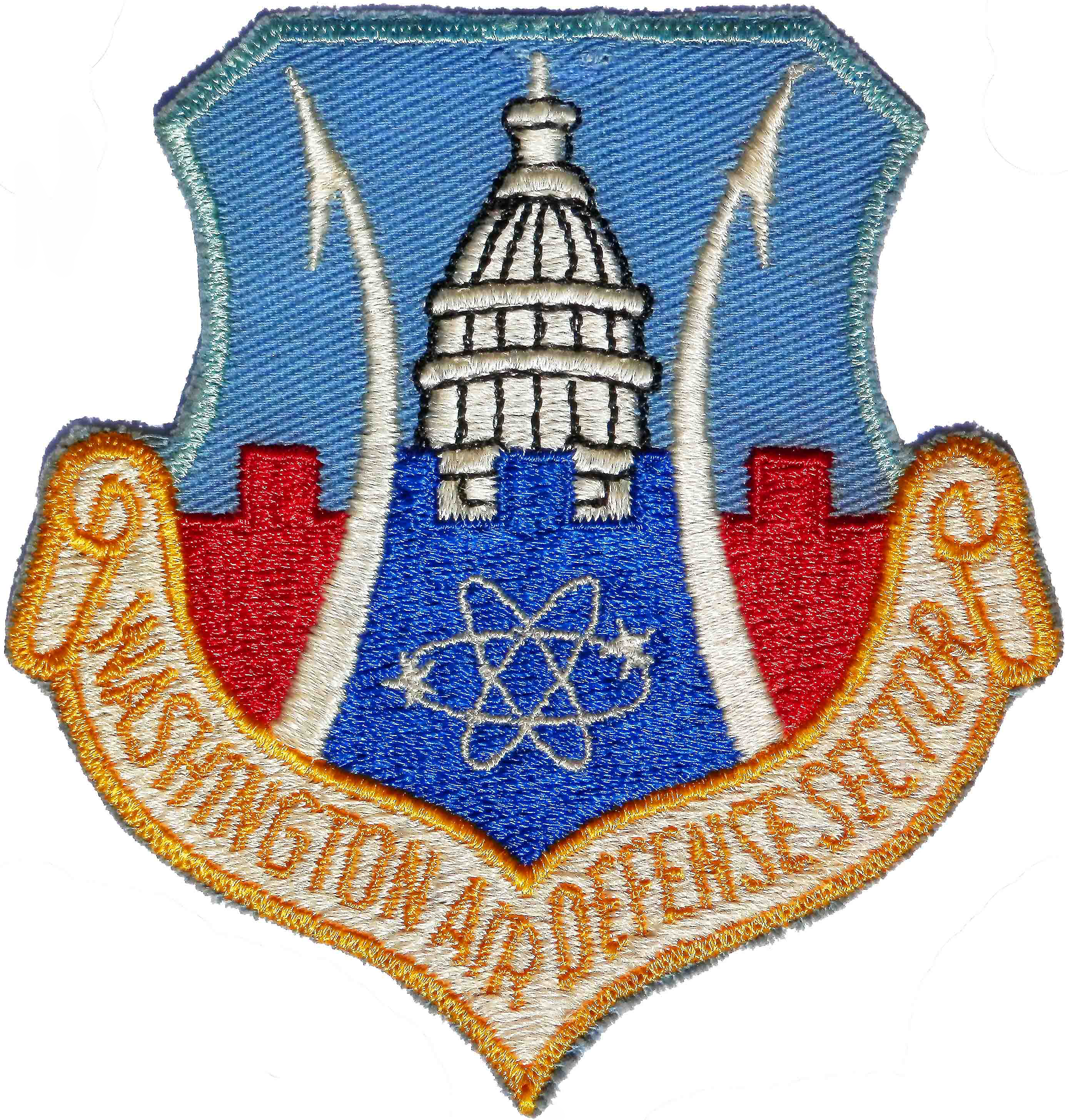
- Washington Air Defense Sector emblem (Note: Approved 5 September 1957. Description: On a shield per fess embattled of the sky proper, and Azure, the silhouetted Capitol dome issuing from the embattlement in chief Argent, and in base an electronic symbol of three orbits, two in saltire, entwined with a third, in fess, marked with two star-like electronic particles of the last [color mentioned]; all between two flanches per fess embattled of the first [color mentioned]and Gules; superimposed over each flanch a profiled delta-shaped projectile, point to chief, with power trail arched to base throughout Argent. Significance: The Capitol dome rising from the embattlement, on the field of our emblem, symbolizes our important area of defense is protected by an impregnable fortress of joint military power. Our national colors, red, white, and blue symbolize joint land, sea, and air military deterrent against an aggressor. The delta projectiles, rising skyward and flanking the Capitol, symbolize powerful missile weapons in readiness to protect our principles of peace and liberty. The electronic symbol over the fortress indicates modern “push-button” electronics covers all routes of our area of defense.)

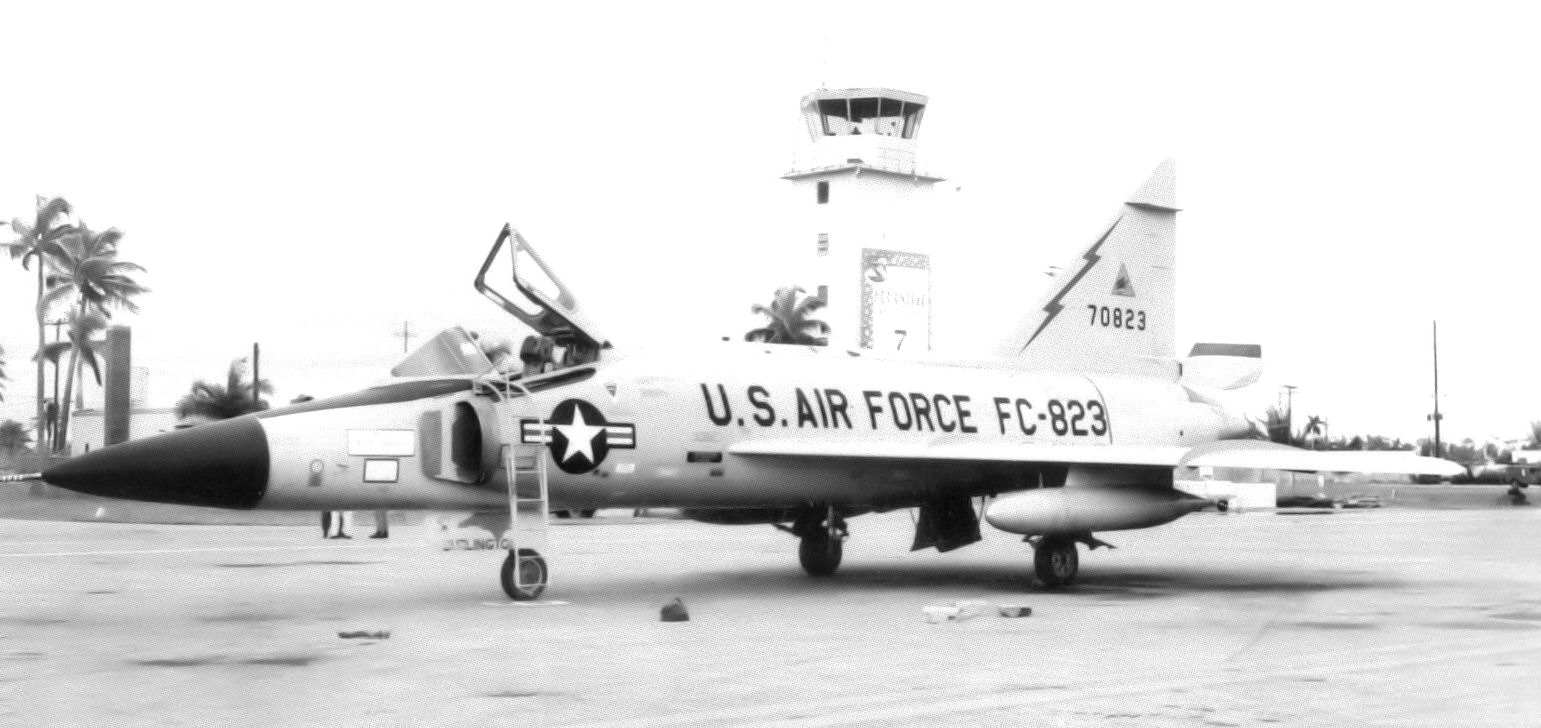
482d Fighter-Interceptor Squadron Convair F-102A-90-CO Delta Dagger 57-823, Washington Air Defense Sector, Seymour Johnson AFB, North Carolina, October 1962, Deployed at Homestead AFB, Florida during Cuban Missile Crisis

The Washington Air Defense Sector (WaADS) is an inactive United States Air Force organization. Its last assignment was with the Air Defense Command (ADC) 26th Air Division, being stationed at Fort Lee Air Force Station (AFS), Virginia. It was inactivated on 1 April 1966.

== History ==
WaADS was established in December 1956 as the 4625th Air Defense Wing. It was not assigned any units until 1958 when it assumed control of former ADC Eastern Air Defense Force units primarily in Maryland, Delaware, and Virginia. Units of the 32d Air Division in North and South Carolina were transferred to WaADS in 1961 as the 26th Air Division area of responsibility expanded southward. The organization provided command and control over several aircraft, missile and radar squadrons.

On 1 February 1959 the new Semi Automatic Ground Environment (SAGE) Direction Center (DC-04) became operational. 37°15′09″N 077°19′21″W DC-04 was equipped with dual AN/FSQ-7 Computers. The day-to-day operations of the command were to train and maintain tactical units flying jet interceptor aircraft (F-101 Voodoo; F-102 Delta Dagger; F-106 Delta Dart) or interceptor missiles (CIM-10 Bomarc) in a state of readiness with training missions and series of exercises with Strategic Air Command and other units simulating interceptions of incoming enemy aircraft.

The sector was eliminated on 1 April 1966 due to a general reorganization of Air Defense Command, most of its assigned units being reassigned to the 33d Air Division

=== Lineage ===
- Designated as 4625th Air Defense Wing, SAGE and organized on 1 December 1956

Redesignated Washington Air Defense Sector on 8 January 1957
Discontinued and inactivated on 1 April 1966

=== Assignments ===
- 85th Air Division, 1 December 1956
- 26th Air Division, 1 September 1958 – 1 April 1966

=== Stations ===
- Fort Lee AFS, Virginia, 1 December 1956 – 1 April 1966

=== Components ===
==== Interceptor squadrons ====
- 48th Fighter-Interceptor Squadron

Langley Air Force Base (AFB), Virginia, 1 September 1958 – 1 April 1966

- 95th Fighter-Interceptor Squadron

Andrews AFB, Maryland, 1 September 1958 – 1 July 1963

- 444th Fighter-Interceptor Squadron

Charleston AFB, South Carolina, 1 July 1961 – 1 April 1966

- 482d Fighter-Interceptor Squadron

Seymour Johnson AFB, North Carolina, 1 July 1961 – 1 October 1965

==== Missile squadron ====
- 22d Air Defense Missile Squadron (BOMARC)

Langley AFB, Virginia, 1 September 1959 – 1 April 1966

==== Radar squadrons ====
- 614th Aircraft Control & Warning Squadron (later 614th Radar Squadron(SAGE))

Cherry Point Marine Corps Air Station, North Carolina, 1 July 1961 – 1 August 1963

- 632nd Aircraft Control & Warning Squadron (later 632d Radar Squadron (SAGE))

Roanoke Rapids AFS, North Carolina, 1 September 1958 – 1 April 1966

- 647th Aircraft Control & Warning Squadron (later 647th Radar Squadron SAGE))

Manassas AFS, Virginia, 1 September 1958 – 25 June 1965

- 649th Aircraft Control & Warning Squadron (later 649th Radar Squadron (SAGE))

Bedford AFS, Virginia, 1 September 1958 – 1 April 1966

- 701st Aircraft Control & Warning Squadron (later 701st Radar Squadron (SAGE))

Fort Fisher AFS, North Carolina, 1 July 1961 – 1 April 1966

- 770th Radar Squadron (SAGE)

Fort George G. Meade, Maryland, 1 October 1961 – 1 April 1966

- 771st Aircraft Control & Warning Squadron (later 771st Radar Squadron (SAGE))

Cape Charles AFS, Virginia, 1 September 1958 – 1 April 1966

- 792nd Aircraft Control & Warning Squadron (later 792d Radar Squadron (SAGE))

North Charleston AFS, South Carolina, 1 July 1961 – 1 April 1966

- 810th Aircraft Control & Warning Squadron (later 810th Radar Squadron (SAGE))

Winston-Salem AFS, North Carolina, 1 July 1961 – 1 April 1966

=== Weapons Systems ===
- F-101B 1961-1966
- F-102A, 1958-1965
- F-106A, 1959-1966
- IM-99 (later CIM-10), 1959-1966

== See also ==
- List of USAF Aerospace Defense Command General Surveillance Radar Stations
- Aerospace Defense Command Fighter Squadrons
- List of MAJCOM wings
- List of United States Air Force aircraft control and warning squadrons

== Notes ==
Explanatory notes

Citations
