= 444th Fighter-Interceptor Squadron =

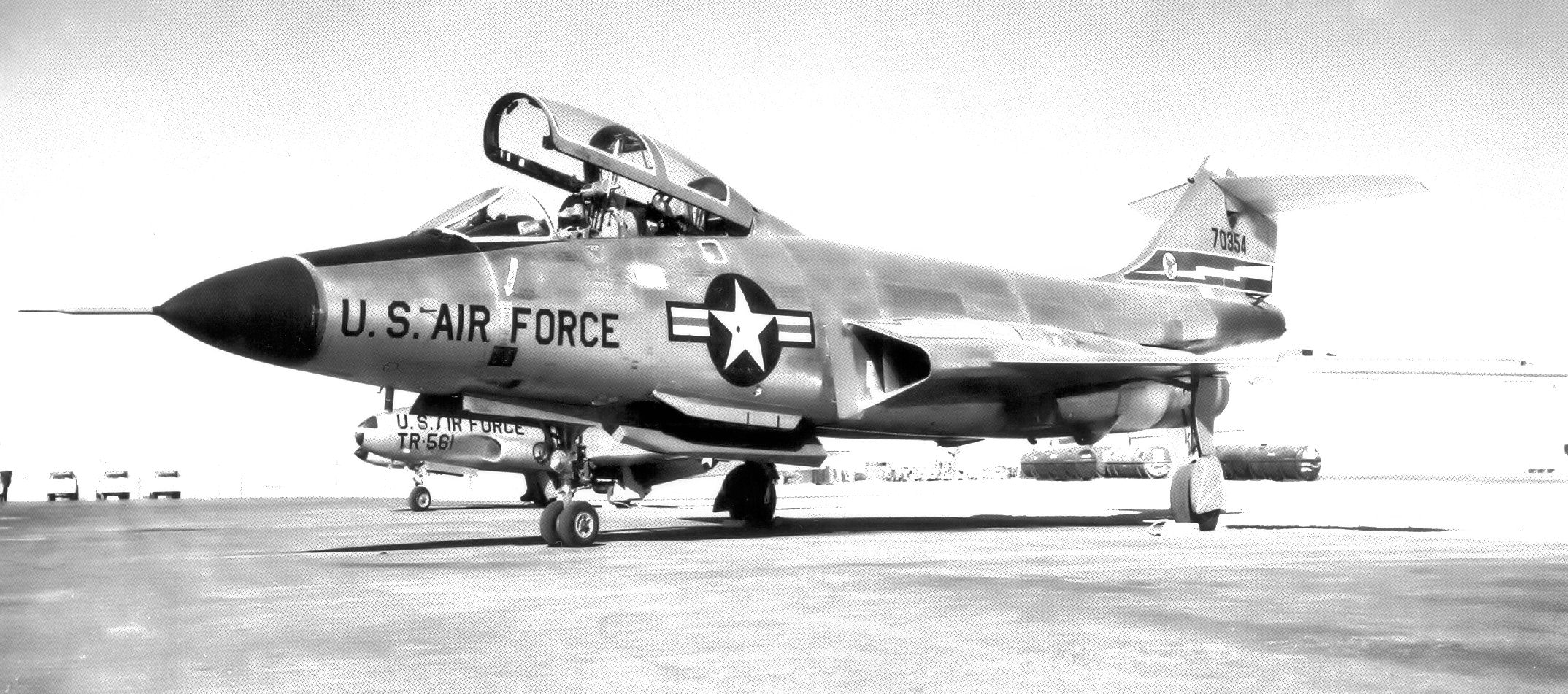
- 444th Fighter-Interceptor Squadron F-101B Voodoo at Charleston AFB in September 1962 (Note: Aircraft is McDonnell F-101B-90-MC Voodoo, serial 57-354. It was sent to the Military Aircraft Storage and Disposition Center on 23 July 1968. In 1971, it was taken from storage and assigned to the Royal Canadian Air Force. It was later on display at CFB Comox. Dirkx, Marco (21 June 2024). "1957 USAF Serial Numbers". Joe Baugher’s Serial Number List.)
- Active: 1943–1944; 1954–1968
- Country: United States
- Branch: United States Air Force
- Role: Fighter interceptor

Insignia
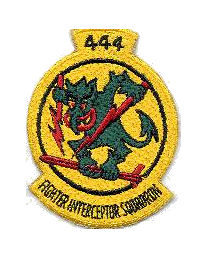
- Patch with 444th Fighter-Interceptor Squadron emblem (Note: Approved 13 July 1954. Description: On a disc Air Force yellow, within a double border of the first [color mentioned] and black, a gargoyle green, lips and eyes red, pupils, eyeballs and teeth Air Force yellow, perched on a rocket and grasping a lightning bolt in each hand, points downward red, all shaded and outlined of the third [color mentioned].)

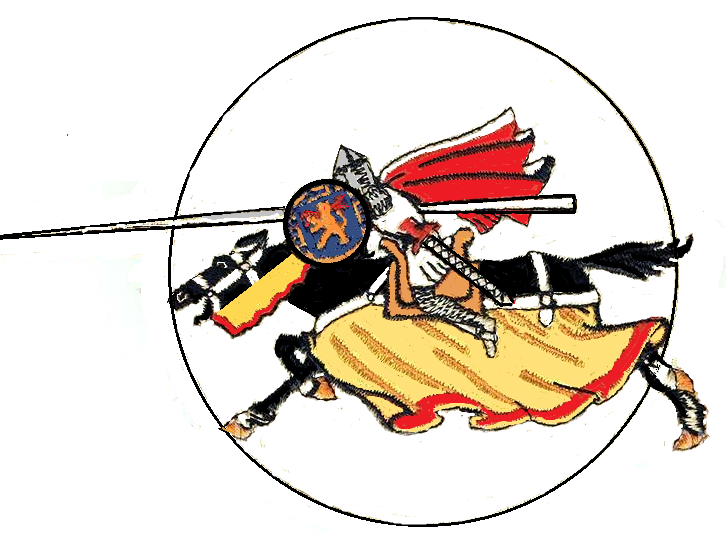
- 444 Fighter Sq emblem (World War II)

The 444th Fighter-Interceptor Squadron is an inactive United States Air Force unit. Its last assignment was with the Washington Air Defense Sector stationed at Charleston Air Force Base, South Carolina, where it was inactivated on 30 September 1968.

== History ==
=== World War II ===
The squadron was first activated at Tonopah Army Air Field, Nevada in February 1943, when the 328th Fighter Group expanded from three to four squadrons. The squadron was initially a Bell P-39 Airacobra replacement training unit. It moved to Concord Army Airfield, California and received Bell P-63 Kingcobra aircraft for training replacement pilots. Moved again to Santa Rosa Army Air Field, continuing mission until it was disbanded on 1 May 1944 and its personnel and equipment were absorbed by the 434th AAF Base Unit (Fighter Replacement Training Unit – Single Engine).

=== Air defense ===
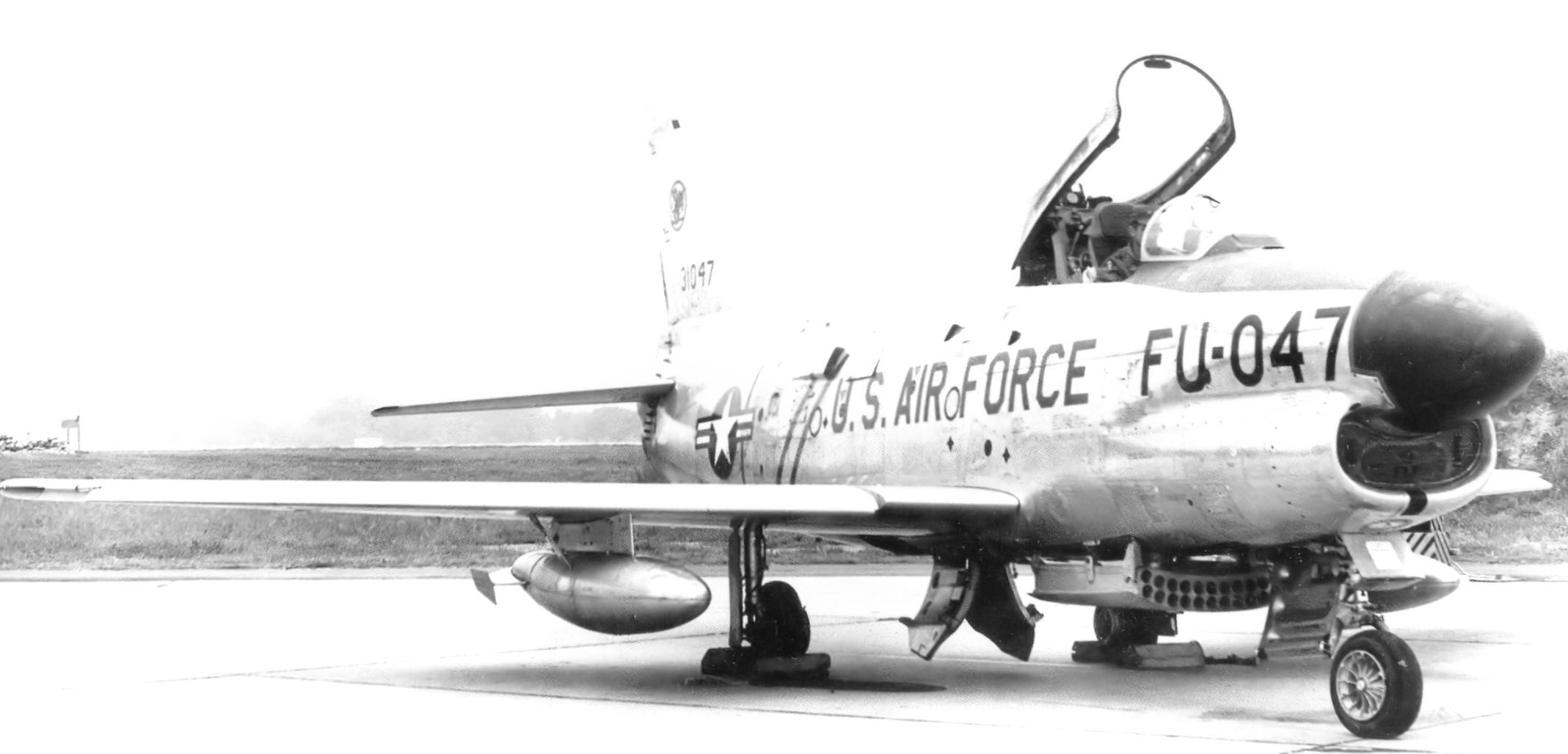
444th Fighter-Interceptor Squadron F-86L (Note: Aircraft is North American F-86L-60-NA Sabre serial 53-4047 at Charleston AFB, South Carolina in July 1957.)

The squadron was reconstituted and activated in 1954 as part of Air Defense Command as an air defense squadron, was equipped with the North American F-86D Sabre and stationed at Charleston Air Force Base, South Carolina with a mission for the air defense of Charleston and the military facilities in the region. Was upgraded to the North American F-86L Sabre in 1957, an improved version of the F-86D which incorporated the Semi Automatic Ground Environment, or SAGE computer-controlled direction system for intercepts.

The 444th was re-equipped with new McDonnell F-101B Voodoo supersonic interceptor, and the F-101F operational and conversion trainer in 1960. The two-seat trainer version was equipped with dual controls, but carried the same armament as the F-101B and were fully combat-capable. Operated the Voodoos until September 1968, the aircraft being passed along to the Air National Guard and the squadron inactivated as part of the general drawdown of the ADC active-duty interceptor force.

== Lineage ==
- Constituted as the 444th Fighter Squadron, Single Engine on 19 February 1943

Activated on 1 March 1943
Disbanded on 31 March 1944

- Reconstituted, and redesignated 444th Fighter-Interceptor Squadron, on 23 March 1953

Activated on 16 February 1954
Inactivated 30 September 1968

=== Assignments ===
- 328th Fighter Group, 1 March 1943 – 31 March 1944
- 35th Air Division, 16 February 1954
- 32d Air Division, 15 November 1958
- Washington Air Defense Sector, 1 July 1961 – 30 September 1968

=== Stations ===
- Hamilton Field, California, 1 March 1943
- Tonopah Army Air Field, Nevada, 6 June 1943
- Concord Army Air Field, California, 18 September 1943
- Santa Rosa Army Air Field, California, 15 December 1943 – 31 March 1944
- Charleston Air Force Base, South Carolina, 16 February 1954 – 30 September 1968

=== Aircraft ===
- Bell P-39 Airacobra, 1943–1944
- Bell P-63 Kingcobra, 1944
- North American F-86D Sabre, 1954–1957
- North American F-86L Sabre, 1957–1960
- McDonnell F-101B Voodoo, 1960–1968
