= 793d Radar Squadron =

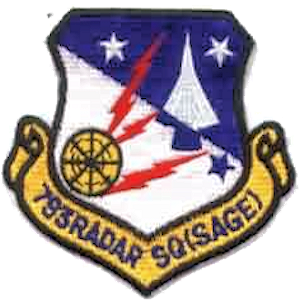
- Emblem of the 793d Radar Squadron
- Active: 1951-1968
- Country: United States
- Branch: United States Air Force
- Type: General Radar Surveillance

The 793d Radar Squadron is an inactive United States Air Force unit. It was last assigned to the 30th Air Division, Aerospace Defense Command, stationed at Hutchinson Air Force Station, Kansas. It was inactivated on 8 September 1968.

The unit was a General Surveillance Radar squadron providing for the air defense of the United States.

== Lineage ==
- Constituted as the 793d Aircraft Control and Warning Squadron

Activated on 1 May 1951
Redesignated as 793d Radar Squadron (SAGE) on 1 February 1962
Discontinued and inactivated on 8 September 1968

=== Assignments ===
- 546th Aircraft Control and Warning Group, 1 May 1951
- 159th Aircraft Control and Warning Group, 4 June 1951
- 33d Air Division, 6 February 1952
- 20th Air Division, 1 March 1956
- Kansas City Air Defense Sector, 1 January 1960
- Sioux City Air Defense Sector, 1 July 1961
- 30th Air Division, 1 April 1966 - 8 September 1968

Stations

- Hutchinson AFS, Kansas, 1 May 1951 - 8 September 1968

== See also ==
- List of United States Air Force aircraft control and warning squadrons
