= 22d Air Defense Missile Squadron =

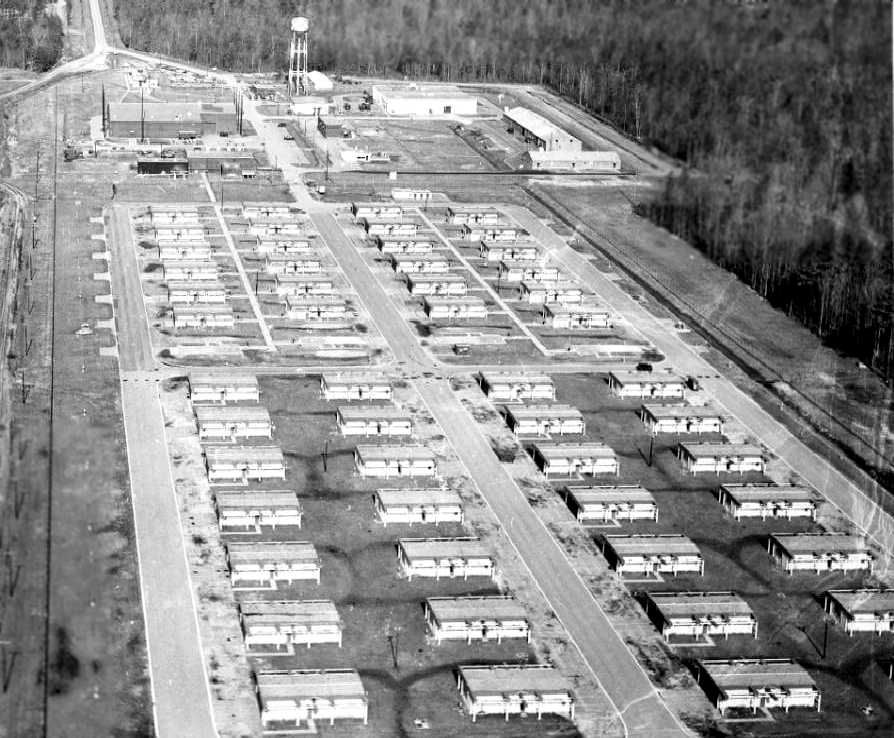
- Langley BOMARC site, 1965
- Active: 1959-1972
- Country: United States
- Branch: United States Air Force
- Type: Squadron
- Role: Air defense
- Decorations: Air Force Outstanding Unit Award

Insignia
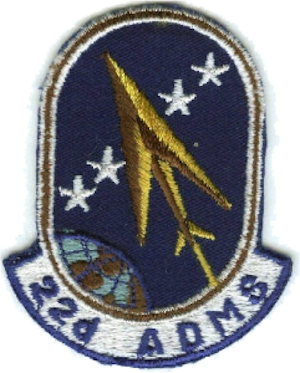
- Patch with 22d Air Defense Missile Squadron emblem (Note: Approved 8 June 1961. Description: On an Air Force blue oval background within a golden brown border fimbriated white, above a turquoise blue demi-globe issuing from dexter base, land areas golden brown, grid lines Air Force blue, a stylized ground-to-air missile flying upward in bend, leaving a trail, colors counterchanged bendwise, golden brown and Air Force golden yellow, between four white stars sinister bendwise, two in dexter, two in sinister chief. Significance: In keeping with the USAF theme, "Aerospace Power for Peace," it represents a free and peaceful world being guarded by the ever present supersonic striking force of the ground-to-air missile, symbolic of BOMARC. The two stars on either side of the missile indicate the numerical designation of the unit.)

The 22d Air Defense Missile Squadron is an inactive United States Air Force unit. It was last assigned to the 20th Air Division of Aerospace Defense Command, stationed near Langley Air Force Base, Virginia, where it was inactivated on 31 October 1972. The squadron was activated in 1959 and equipped with BOMARC missiles for the air defense of the area near its base.

== History ==
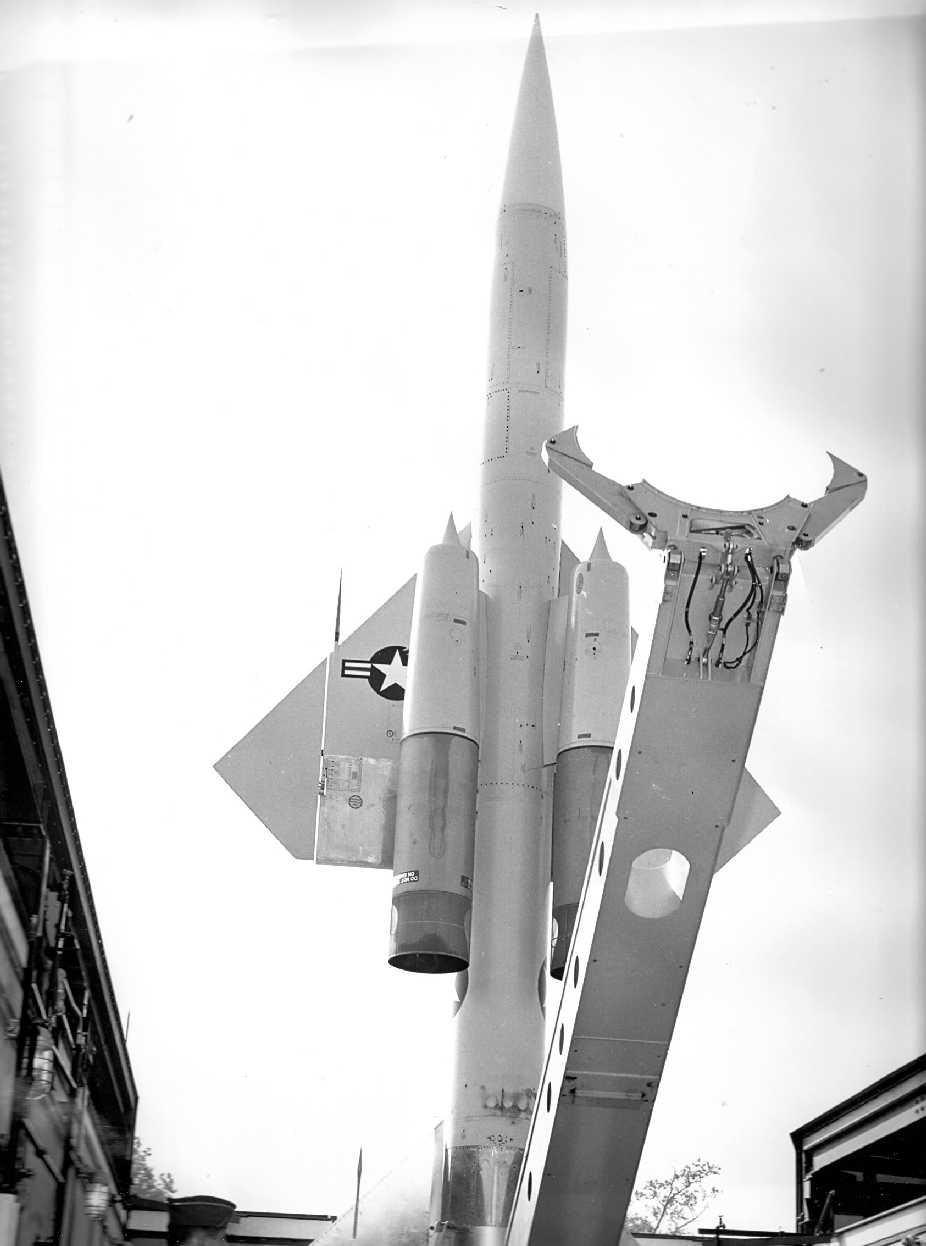
A 1965 photo of a squadron BOMARC missile elevated in its shelter

The squadron was activated at Langley Air Force Base, Virginia on 1 September 1959 as the 22d Air Defense Missile Squadron (BOMARC) and stood alert during the Cold War. It was equipped with IM-99A (later CIM-10) BOMARC surface to air antiaircraft missiles. It became operational with the IM-99A in September 1960, and upgraded to the IM-99B in October 1961. The squadron was tied into the Washington Semi-Automatic Ground Environment (SAGE) direction center which used analog computers to process information from ground radars, picket ships and airborne aircraft to accelerate the display of tracking data at the direction center to quickly direct the missile battery to engage hostile aircraft. The 22d became nonoperational o 1 October 1972 and was inactivated on 31 October 1972.

The BOMARC missile site was located 3 miles (4.8 km) west-northwest of Langley at 37°05′57″N 076°28′47″W. Although geographically separated from the base, it received administrative and logistical support from Langley.

== Lineage ==
- Constituted as the 22d Air Defense Missile Squadron on 10 July 1959

Activated on 1 September 1959
Inactivated on 31 October 1972

=== Assignments ===
- Washington Air Defense Sector, 1 September 1959
- 33d Air Division, 1 April 1966
- 20th Air Division, 19 November 1969 – 31 October 1972

=== Awards ===
- Air Force Outstanding Unit Award

1 September 1963 – 28 February 1965

== See also ==
- List of United States Air Force missile squadrons
