= 645th Radar Squadron =

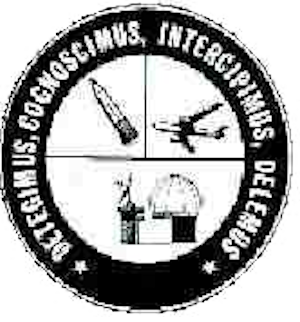
- Emblem of the 645th Radar Squadron
- Active: 1948–1952, 1962-1976
- Country: United States
- Branch: United States Air Force
- Type: General Radar Surveillance

The 645th Radar Squadron is an inactive United States Air Force unit. It was last assigned to the 20th Air Division, Aerospace Defense Command, stationed at Patrick Air Force Base, Florida. It was inactivated on 1 April 1976.

The unit was a General Surveillance Radar squadron providing for the air defense of the United States.

Lineage

- Activated 30 April 1948 as the 645th Aircraft Control Squadron

Redesignated 6 December 1949 as the 645th Aircraft Control and Warning Squadron
Inactivated on 6 February 1952

- Redesignated 645th Radar Squadron (SAGE)and activated on 28 June 1963
- Organized on 1 November 1962

Redesignated 645th Radar Squadron on 1 February 1974
Inactivated on 1 April 1976

Assignments

- 503d Aircraft Control and Warning Group, 30 April 1949 – 6 February 1952
- Air Defense Command, 28 June 1962
- Montgomery Air Defense Sector, 1 November 1962
- 32d Air Division, 1 April 1966
- 33d Air Division, 14 November 1969
- 20th Air Division, 19 November 1969 – 1 April 1976

Stations

- Roslyn AFS, New York, 1 April 1948
- Selfridge AFB, Michigan, March 1949
- Roslyn AFS, New York, 8 December 1949 - 6 February 1952
- Patrick AFB, Florida, 28 June 1962 – 1 April 1976

Notes

- The squadron was programmed for activation in the 1950s at Marathon AS, Ontario, but this action was cancelled. During the 1960s Air Force units that were activated were paper units until they were organized.
