= Roslyn Air National Guard Station =

Former Air National Guard Station in Roslyn, New York, United States

Roslyn Air National Guard Station
- Part of New York Air National Guard

Site information
- Type: Air National Guard Station
- Controlled by: United States Air Force

Location
- Location of Roslyn Air National Guard Station, New York
- Coordinates: 40°47′47″N 073°37′37″W

Site history
- Built: 1941
- In use: 1941-2000

Roslyn Air National Guard Station (ADC ID: P-3) is a closed United States Air Force station. It was located in East Hills, New York, on Long Island. It was originally part of Clarence MacKay's Harbor Hill estate. It was closed in 2000.

== History ==
=== World War II ===
During 1942, the site was leased by the United States Army from Clarence Mackay for a headquarters station, initially for the I Interceptor Command, then the unit being re-designated to I Fighter Command, a component of First Air Force. The leased site was designated as "Subpost #3, Mitchel Army Airfield". The 164th Army Air Forces Base Unit (Fighter Control) (164th AAFBU) was assigned to the station on 10 April 1944. The unit assumed the duties of the inactivated New York Fighter Wing.

The command established an integrated command and control facility dedicated solely to air defense. The first military buildings consisted of nine buildings, including enlisted and officer quarters, mess hall, recreation building, store room, transmitter building, receiver station, and radio tower, and D/F homer station.

Prior to April 1944, access roads, 7 foot barbed wire perimeter fence, Fighter Control Center (currently Building 6), emergency power building, and power distribution system had been completed. At this time, the installation was called the Roslyn Filter Center.

The mission of the 164th AAFBU was detection, interception, identification, and if necessary, destruction of all aircraft in the greater New York Metropolitan area. Through the use of radar and ground observers, the controllers of the Fighter Control Center would identify and classify all aircraft operating in the region. Unknown aircraft would be targeted for interception, and destruction if necessary, by interceptors operating out of nearby military airfields such as Mitchel Field, or by other active defense systems, such as anti-aircraft artillery (AAA), barrage balloons, and smoke generated equipment situated around nearby defense plants and military installations. Orders to passive defensive systems such as blackouts and air raid warnings were also issued from the Fighter Control Center to the appropriate Civil Defense personnel.

The Roslyn Filter Center operated until the end of the war and was then declared surplus to the needs of the Air Defense Command. Operating personnel were withdrawn on or about 14 January 1946, and the 164th AAFBU was inactivated. Caretaker personnel were assigned to protect the property against pilfering and vandalism.

=== Air Defense Command ===
The United States Air Force re-leased the established facility in 1951 and assigned it to Air Defense Command (ADC). On 1 January 1951 ADC assigned the 503d Aircraft Control and Warning Group to Roslyn with the mission of developing a general radar surveillance system for the New York area. The 645th Aircraft Control and Warning Squadron was assigned to the station which established a Manual Control Center (MCC) at the facility. The unit received information from the 773d AC&W Squadron at Camp Hero, New York (L-10); the 646th AC&W Squadron at Twin Lights, New Jersey (L-12), and the 770th AC&W Squadron at Palermo, New Jersey (L-13).

The 503d AC&W Group and 645th AC&W Squadron were inactivated 6 February 1952, their mission being taken over by the 26th Air Division. In 1953, the U.S. Government purchased the 50 acre facility for the sum of $250,000, the facility being designated as Roslyn Air Force Station (AFS). The 26th AD commanded the Manual Air-Defense Control Center (ADCC) established by the predecessor ADC organizations coordinating air defense over an area that covered much of the industrial northeast, including New York City, Philadelphia, and Washington, D.C.. It employed off shore naval picket ships, fixed "Texas Tower" radar sites, airborne early warning units, and a civilian ground observer corps program.

The 26th AD phased down in when the SAGE program was implemented at McGuire AFB, New Jersey, the control center being re-designated as the "Combat Alert Center (Manual)". It was reassigned to Syracuse AFS, New York on 15 August 1958.

=== New York Air National Guard ===
With the reassignment of the ADC 26th Air Division, control of Roslyn AFS was transferred to the New York Air National Guard. The NYANG assigned a variety of non-flying units to the station, the 152nd Tactical Control Group, moving to the station in 1959. It later was moved to Syracuse, New York. The 213th Engineering Installation Squadron moved to the station in 1959, with a mission install and maintain Radio, Central Office, and Wire communications Facilities under the Air Force Communication Service.

=== Closure ===
BRAC 1995 closed Roslyn Air National Guard Station, with inactivation taking place in 2000. In 2005, the former Air Force station was torn down, being replaced by the Park at East Hills. A few former Air Force buildings remain in the woods to the west of the park, deteriorating and being covered by vegetation.

== See also ==
- List of USAF Aerospace Defense Command General Surveillance Radar Stations
