= Hutchinson Air Force Station =

Closed United States Air Force station

Hutchinson Air Force Station
- Located near: Yoder, Kansas
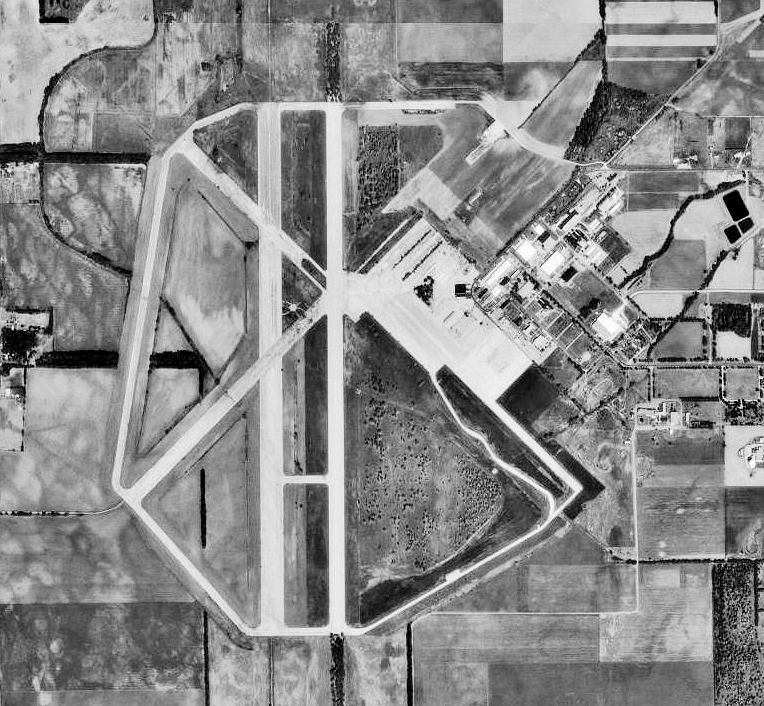
- USGS photo, 1 October 1991

Site information
- Type: Air Force Station
- Controlled by: United States Navy; United States Air Force

Location
- Location of Hutchinson AFS, Kansas
- Coordinates: 37°55′34″N 097°53′13″W

Site history
- Built: 1942
- In use: 1952-1968

Hutchinson Air Force Station (ADC ID: P-47, NORAD ID: Z-47) is a closed United States Air Force station. It is located 2 miles (3.2 km) west-southwest of Yoder, Kansas. It was closed for all military use in 1968. It was operated alongside Hutchinson Air National Guard Base when it was operational.

== History ==
In 1951 the United States Air Force Air Defense Command selected a portion of the then-closed World War II NAS Hutchinson facility as a site for one of twenty-eight radar stations built as part of the second segment of the permanent ADC general radar surveillance network for the United States. Prompted by the start of the Korean War, on 11 July 1950, the Secretary of the Air Force asked the Secretary of Defense for approval to expedite construction of the second segment of the permanent network.

Receiving the Defense Secretary's approval on 21 July, the Air Force directed the Army Corps of Engineers to proceed with construction of a radar station on the eastern part of the ground station, about a mile from the runways and ramp/hangars being used by the Navy when it reactivated its facilities.

On 1 May 1951, the 793d Aircraft Control and Warning Squadron (AC&W Sq) was activated at Hutchinson Air Force Station (AFS) (P-47), the radar site on the facility. In May 1952, the 793 AC&W Sq began operating a pair of AN/FPS-10 radars, and initially the station functioned as a Ground-Control Intercept (GCI) and warning station. As a GCI station, the squadron's role was to guide interceptor aircraft toward unidentified intruders picked up on the unit's radar scopes. During 1958, an AN/FPS-3 search radar saw duty and a pair of AN/FPS-6A height-finder radars were installed.

By late 1959, Hutchinson AFS was performing air traffic control duties for the Federal Aviation Administration. At this time the site operated an AN/FPS-20 search radar. In the early 1960s, this radar was upgraded and redesignated as an AN/FPS-66. During late January 1961, Hutchinson AFS joined the Semi Automatic Ground Environment (SAGE) system, feeding data to Site DC-22 at Sioux City AFS, Iowa. After joining, the squadron was redesignated as the 793d Radar Squadron (SAGE) on 1 February 1962. The radar squadron provided information 24/7/52 to the SAGE Direction Center, where it was analyzed to determine range, direction altitude speed and whether or not aircraft were friendly or hostile.

On 31 July 1963, the site was redesignated as NORAD ID Z-47. By 1963, height-finding duties were being performed by AN/FPS-6A radars, and one was upgraded to an AN/FPS-90 in 1964.

In addition to the main facility, Hutchinson operated two AN/FPS-14 Gap Filler sites:

- Ellsworth, KS (P-47A) 38°50′29″N 098°11′49″W
- Wilsey, KS (P-47B) 38°40′02″N 096°44′11″W

The 793rd Radar Squadron was inactivated on 8 September 1968, primarily due to budget reductions. With its closure the site was declared excess and closed on 30 September 1968.

== Station today ==
The main support station is now the Hutchinson Community College and Area Vocational School, which have torn down the former military buildings and replaced them with new buildings. Some former military family housing units appear to be in use as private residences.

The Federal Aviation Administration took over operation and maintenance of the former Air Force radars. which are still in use. (N 37 55' 23" W 97 53' 15").

== See also ==
- List of USAF Aerospace Defense Command General Surveillance Radar Stations
- List of United States Air Force aircraft control and warning squadrons
