= AN/FPS-8 Radar =

Cold War-era American air defense radar

AN/FPS-8
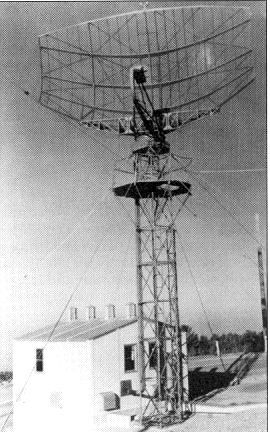
- General Electric AN/FPS-8 Radar
- Country of origin: United States
- Manufacturer: General Electric
- Introduced: 1954-1958
- No. built: Over 200 produced
- Type: Medium-Range Search Radar
- Frequency: 1280 - 1380 megahertz
- PRF: 360 hertz
- Beamwidth: 2.5 degrees
- Pulsewidth: 3 microseconds
- RPM: 0 to 10 rpm
- Power: 1 MW
- Other names: AN/GPS-3, AN/MPS-11, AN/FPS-88

The AN/FPS-8 Radar was a Medium-Range Search Radar used by the United States Air Force Air Defense Command.

The radar was a medium power D-Band search radar designed for aircraft control and early warning, and was installed at commercial airports and military bases both in the United States and overseas. In most installations the antenna was exposed, being mounted on a temporary tower.

For severe environmental conditions, the AN/FPS-8 was self-contained in an arctic tower with a protective radome. Over the years improvements were made to the basic AN/FPS-8, culminating in the final version whose nomenclature was AN/FPS-88 (V). The AN/FPS-8 also had two mobile versions: the AN/MPS-11 and the AN/MPS-11A.

In accordance with the Joint Electronics Type Designation System (JETDS), the "AN/FPS-7" designation represents the 7th design of an Army-Navy electronic device for fixed ground search radar. The JETDS system also now is used to name all Department of Defense electronic systems.

== See also ==
- List of radars
- List of military electronics of the United States
