= 85th Air Division =

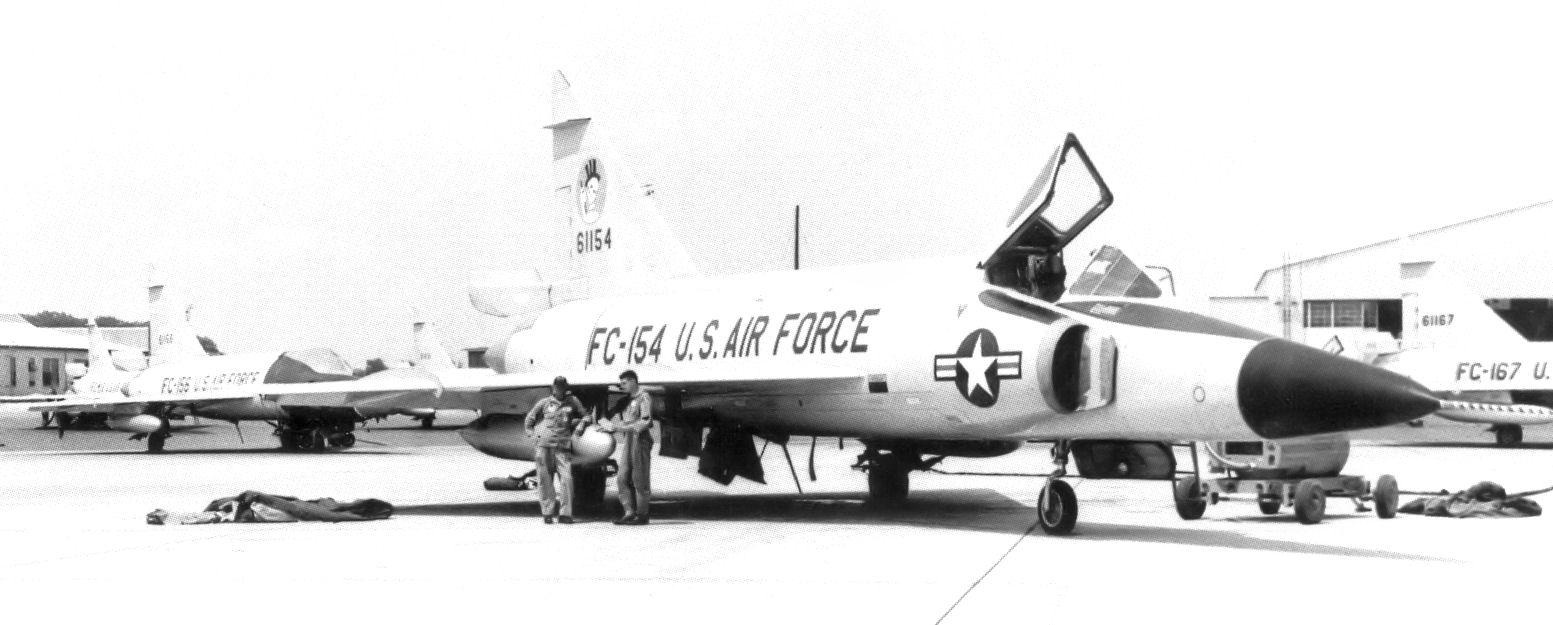
- 95th Fighter-Interceptor Squadron F-102A at Andrews AFB (Note: Aircraft is Convair F-102A-65-CO Delta Dagger, serial 56-1154 in March 1958.)
- Active: 1943–1948; 1955–1958
- Country: United States
- Branch: United States Air Force
- Role: Command of air defense units
- Engagements: South West Pacific Theater of World War II
- Decorations: Philippine Republic Presidential Unit Citation

Insignia
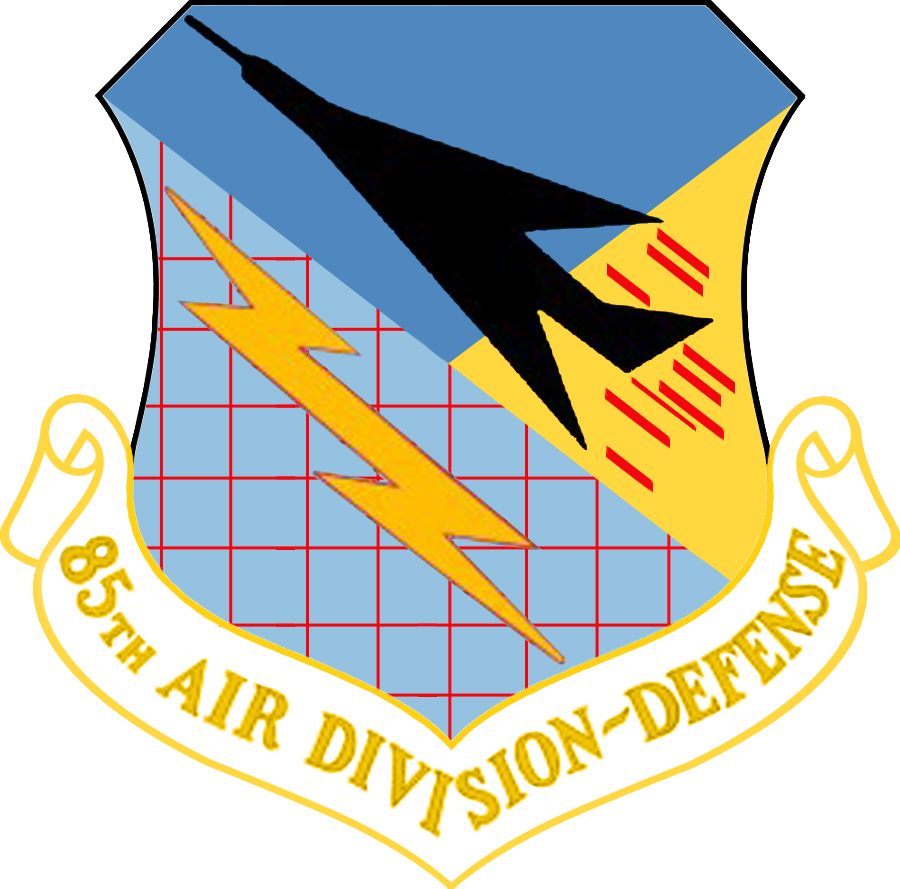
- 85th Air Division emblem (Note: Approved 26 December 1956.)

The 85th Air Division is an inactive United States Air Force unit. Its last assignment was with Eastern Air Defense Force of Air Defense Command at Andrews Air Force Base, Maryland. It was inactivated on 1 September 1958.

== History ==
During World War II, the 85th Fighter Wing was a command and control organization of Fifth Air Force, operating primarily in the Southwest Pacific Theater. It had no units assigned before departing overseas from California. In the Southwest Pacific Area its units fought in "New Guinea and the Philippine Islands (February 1944 – August 1945) [flying] cover missions for convoys, patrols, escorted bombers, attacked enemy airfields, and support[ing] ground forces."

"After the war's end, the organization provided fighter protection for the Philippine Islands and conducted an intensive training program in aerial combat, gunnery, and instrument flying, until [the units inactivation in] June 1948."

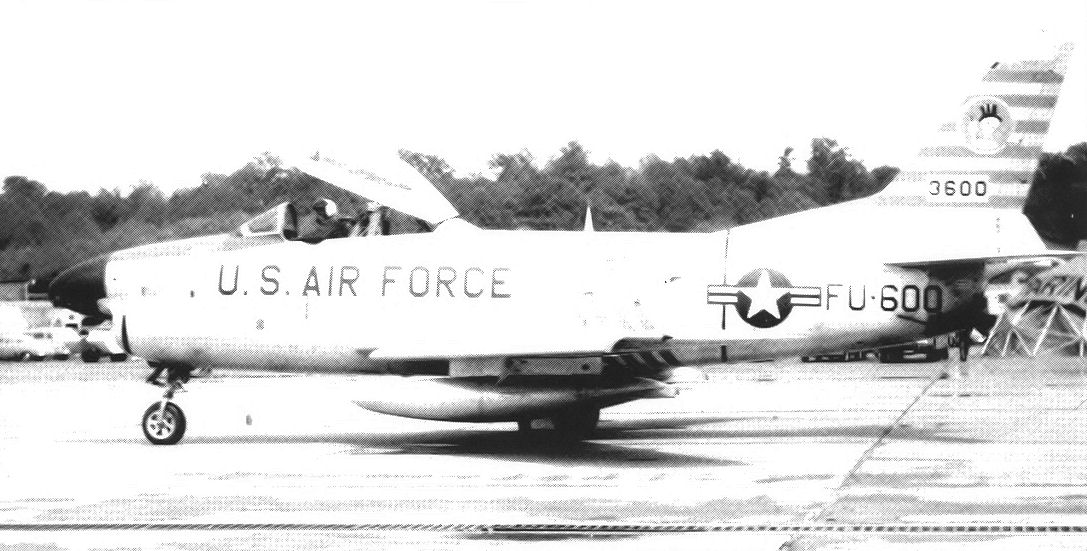
95th FIS F-86D-55 at Andrews AFB in 1955 (Note: Aircraft is North American F-86D-55-NA Sabre Serial 53-600 in 1955.)

During the Cold War the unit was reactivated as an Air Division by Air Defense Command. "It was assigned to the Eastern Air Defense Force in September 1955 with a mission to intercept unidentified aircraft over the Washington, D.C. area. It participated in numerous training exercises. It also took part in gunnery and air-launched training and readiness tests." Inactivated in September 1958.

== Lineage ==
- Established as the 85th Fighter Wing on 4 November 1943

Activated on 10 November 1943
Inactivated on 30 June 1948

- Redesignated 85 Air Division (Defense) on 3 May 1955

Activated on 8 September 1955
Inactivated on 1 September 1958

=== Assignments ===
- Fourth Air Force, 10 November 1943
- IV Fighter Command, 28 November 1943 – 10 January 1944
- Army Service Forces, Port of Embarkation, 10 January – 17 February 1944
- Fifth Air Force, 18 February 1944
- Far East Air Forces, 11 May 1945
- Thirteenth Air Force, 1 September 1945
- Fifth Air Force, 1 June 1947 – 30 June 1948
- Eastern Air Defense Force, 8 September 1955 – 1 September 1958

=== Stations ===
- Hamilton Field, California, 10 November 1943
- San Francisco Airport, California, 10 November 1943 – 10 January 1944
- Gusap Airfield, New Guinea, 25 February 1944
- Hollandia Airfield Complex, New Guinea, 24 July 1944
- Bayug Airfield, Leyte, Philippines, 24 October 1944
- Fort William McKinley, Luzon, Philippines, c. 15 June 1945
- Basa Air Base, Luzon, Philippines, c. 15 July 1946
- Nagoya Airfield, Japan, 1 June 1947 – 30 June 1948
- Andrews Air Force Base, Maryland, 8 September 1955 – 1 September 1958

=== Components ===
Wing

- 4625th Air Defense Wing (later Washington Air Defense Sector): 1 December 1956 – 1 September 1958

Groups

- 18th Fighter Group: 15 March 1946 – 1 May 1947
- 49th Fighter Group: 19 April – 5 June 1944
- 348th Fighter Group: 7 November 1944 – 8 February 1945
- 414th Fighter Group: c. 15 December 1945-c. 30 September 1946
- 475th Fighter Group: 16 June 1944 – 18 May 1945

Squadrons

- 17th Photographic Reconnaissance Squadron: 1 February – 22 March 1946
- 48th Fighter-Interceptor Squadron: 1 March 1956 – 1 September 1958
- 95th Fighter-Interceptor Squadron: 1 March 1956 – 1 September 1958
- 419th Night Fighter Squadron: 10 January 1946 – 20 February 1947
- 482d Fighter-Interceptor Squadron: 8 April 1956 – 1 September 1958
- 550th Night Fighter Squadron: 7 April-c. 30 June 1945

== See also ==
- List of USAF Aerospace Defense Command General Surveillance Radar Stations
- Aerospace Defense Command Fighter Squadrons
- List of United States Air Force air divisions
