= Fort Lee Air Force Station =

Former United States Air Force station

Fort Lee Air Force Station
- Part of Air Defense Command (ADC)

Site information
- Type: Air Force Station
- Controlled by: United States Air Force

Location
- Location of Fort Lee AFS, Virginia
- Coordinates: 37°15′08″N 77°19′21″W

Site history
- Built: 1956
- In use: 1956-1983

Garrison information
- Garrison: Washington Air Defense Sector; 33d Air Division; 20th Air Division

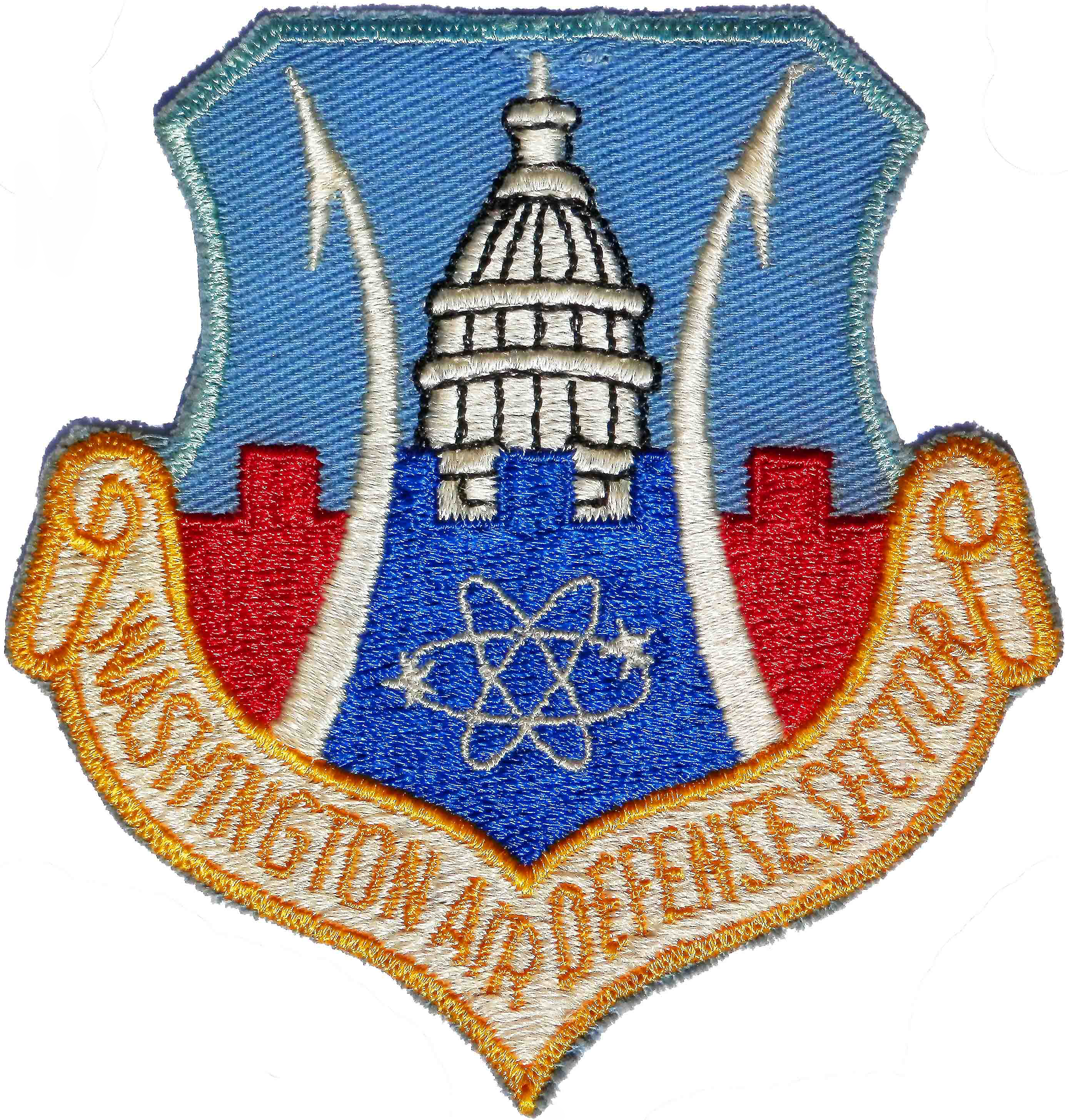
Emblem of the Washington Air Defense Sector

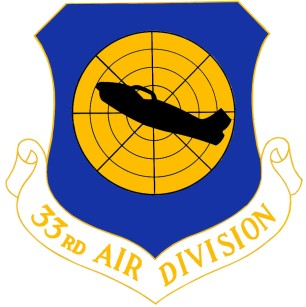
Emblem of the 33d Air Division

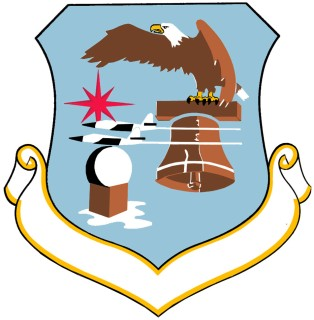
Emblem of the 20th Air Division

Fort Lee Air Force Station is a former United States Air Force station. It is located 2.9 miles (4.7 km) northwest of Prince George, Virginia. It was closed in 1983 due to budget cuts.

== History ==
Fort Lee Air Force Station, located on the United States Army Fort Lee installation, was selected in 1956 for a Semi Automatic Ground Environment (SAGE) system direction center (DC) site, designated DC-04. The SAGE system was a network linking Air Force (and later FAA) General Surveillance Radar stations into a centralized center for Air Defense, intended to provide early warning and response for a Soviet nuclear attack. This automated control system was used by NORAD for tracking and intercepting enemy bomber aircraft. In the later versions the system could automatically direct aircraft to an interception by sending instructions directly to the aircraft's autopilot.

The 4625th Air Defense Wing was activated at the site under the 85th Air Division on 1 December 1956 to supervise the construction of the SAGE blockhouses and the installation and testing of the SAGE electronic and data processing equipment. The 4625th ADW was re-designated as the Washington Air Defense Sector (WaADS) on 8 January 1957 upon DC-04's activation, remaining under the 85th AD.

The operation of the Semi Automatic Ground Environment (SAGE) direction center (DC-04) was the mission the WaADS. The Sector was disestablished on 1 April 1966, the SAGE operations were reassigned to the 33d Air Division, being moved to Fort Lee AFS from Richards-Gebaur AFB, Missouri. The 33d AD was inactivated on 19 November 1969, its assets being assumed by the newly reactivated 20th Air Division at Fort Lee AFS

The DC-04 and the 20th Air Division were inactivated on 1 March 1983 by Air Defense, Tactical Air Command (ADTAC). With its inactivation, Fort Lee Air Force Station was closed. After its closure, the site was taken over by other Federal Government agencies, and it now houses several such offices. Only the orderly room, mess hall and one barracks building still stand of the Air Force station.

The SAGE blockhouse also stands, now named Von Steuben Hall, it contains the U.S. Army Communications-Electronics Command (CECOM) Software Engineering Center - Lee (SEC-Lee).

=== Known ADCOM units assigned ===
- 20th ADCOM Region

Transferred to ADTAC as 20th NORAD Region, 1 October 1979 – 1 March 1983

- 20th Air Division, 19 November 1969 – 1 March 1983
- 33d Air Division, 1 April 1966 – 19 November 1969
- Washington Air Defense Sector, 8 January 1957 – 1 April 1966
- 4638th Air Defense Squadron (SAGE), 1 July 1972

Re-designated: 20th Air Defense Squadron (SAGE), 1 January 1975 – 1 March 1983

== See also ==
- List of USAF Aerospace Defense Command General Surveillance Radar Stations
