= Experimental SAGE Subsector =

The Experimental Semi-Automatic Ground Environment (SAGE) Sector (ESS, Experimental SAGE Subsector until planned Sectors/Subsectors were renamed NORAD Regions, Divisions, and Sectors) was a prototype Cold War Air Defense Sector for developing the Semi Automatic Ground Environment. The Lincoln Laboratory control center in a new building was at Lexington, Massachusetts.

== ESS Computer System ==
The network's Direction Center was completed in a new 1954 building (Building F, 42°27′37″N 071°16′04″W) with prototype peripherals and a single IBM XD-1 computer, a successor to Lincoln Lab's Whirlwind I computer (WWI). In 1955, Air Force personnel began IBM training at the Kingston, New York, prototype facility, and the "4620th Air Defense Wing (experimental SAGE) was established at Lincoln Laboratory"—its "primary mission was computer programming".

ESS had a capacity of 48 tracks and used a pre-SAGE ground environment in a "prototype intercept monitor room [at] MIT's Barta building" with "track situation displays, which geographically showed Air Defense Identification Zone lines and antiaircraft circles [and] each console also had a 5-inch CRT for digital information display. Audible alert signals were used, with a different signal for each symbol on a situation display."

== Radar stations ==
Initial service test models of the Burroughs AN/FST-2 Coordinate Data Transmitting Set were placed with radars at South Truro and West Bath, Maine; followed by Texas Tower#2 (TT2) in the Atlantic Ocean, which provided a "triangular pattern with overlap" radar coverage (TT2 later had a connection from the XD-1 via the GE G/A Data Link Output Subsystem through North Truro Air Force Station.) By August 1955, 13 radar stations were networked by the subsector, e.g.:

- Chatham
- Clinton, Massachusetts with gap-filler radar
- Great Boars Head
- Halibut Point
- Killingly, Connecticut (41.865734°N 71.820958°W).with gap-filler radar
- Rockport Air Force Station
- Scituate, Massachusetts
- South Truro
- West Bath, Maine (43°54′7″N 69°50′43″W) with AN/FPS-31 on Jug Handle Hill: ("Lincoln Laboratories experimental radar station")

Required by 21 November 1955 were 44 consoles: 38 for the operations floor, 3 on the computer floor for display maintenance, and 3 near the maintenance console (program checkout). WWI was connected to the Experimental SAGE Subsector to verify crosstelling (collateral communication) with the ESS DC, and WWI was also used for a Ground-to-Air (G/A) experiment using a transmitter of the GE G/A Data Link Output Subsystem on Prospect Hill, Waltham, MA sending data to simulated airborne equipment at Lexington. Transmissions from the WWI SAGE Evaluation (WISE) computer system to XD-1 and back were without error by December 1955 when operational software specifications were frozen. Operating procedures for the ESS external sites were complete in March 1956, and

== System Operation Testing ==
From November 15, 1955, to November 7, 1956, three System Operation Tests were conducted which used voice "Ground-to-Air" communication from the Barta control room to aircraft outfitted with SAGE receivers (F-86 interceptors modified to F-86L models in "Project FOLLOW-ON".) Test teams included employees of Bell Telephone Laboratories, Western Electric-ADES, IBM, the RAND Corporation, and Lincoln Labs' Division 6, Division 3, & Division 2 (Division 6 had been created for ESS support.)

The North Truro P-10 AN/FST-2 was moved to Almaden Air Force Station (M-96)c. 1957-8 and on August 7, 1958, control of an airborne BOMARC missile that had malfunctioned transferred from the "Experimental SAGE Sector" to a Westinghouse AN/GPA-35 Ground Environment system and the missile crashed into the Atlantic Ocean. By December 31, 1958, ADC Manual 55-28 described the Model 3 SAGE System.

External images
- Military operators at ESS consoles
- ""Prototype intercept monitor room in the SAGE direction center in MIT's Barta building." [dated February 19, 1955 at archive[dot]today[slash]tPdY2]

== 1959 Experimental Testing ==
"To prove out the revised SAGE computer program" for Automatic Targeting and Battery Evaluation and ADDC-AADCP crosstelling, a "SAGE/Missile Master" test was conducted beginning in September 1959 with communications between the ESS XD-1 and Martin AN/FSG-1 Antiaircraft Defense System equipment at Fort Banks planned for the CONAD Joint Control Center at Fort Heath—a "SAGE ATABE Simulation Study" (SASS) was also completed 1959–60 by MITRE Corporation.
