= Belleville Air Force Station =

Closed United States Air Force General Surveillance Radar station

Belleville Air Force Station
- Part of Air Defense Command (ADC)

Site information
- Type: Air Force Station
- Code: ADC ID: P-70, NORAD ID: Z-70
- Controlled by: United States Air Force

Location
- Location of Belleville AFS, Illinois
- Coordinates: 38°28′32″N 089°54′21″W

Site history
- Built: 1951
- In use: 1951-1968

Garrison information
- Garrison: 798th Aircraft Control and Warning (Later Radar) Squadron

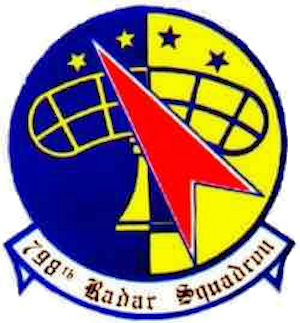
Emblem of the 798th Radar Squadron

Belleville Air Force Station is a closed United States Air Force General Surveillance Radar station. It is located 2 miles (3.2 km) southeast of Belleville, Illinois. It was closed in 1968.

== History ==
Belleville AFS was one of twenty-eight stations built as part of the second segment of the Air Defense Command permanent radar network, primarily to provide air defense radar coverage for Saint Louis and Scott Air Force Base. Prompted by the start of the Korean War, on 11 July 1950, the Secretary of the Air Force asked the Secretary of Defense for approval to expedite construction of the permanent network. Receiving the Defense Secretary's approval on 21 July, the Air Force directed the Corps of Engineers to proceed with construction.

On 1 May 1951 the 798th Aircraft Control and Warning Squadron began operations. The site initially used AN/CPS-4 and AN/FPS-3 radars, and initially the station functioned as a Ground-Control Intercept (GCI) and warning station. As a GCI station, the squadron's role was to guide interceptor aircraft toward unidentified intruders picked up on the unit's radar scopes. The AN/FPS-3 remained in operation until 1963 (at which time it presumably was upgraded to an AN/FPS-20).

The United States Army established Army Air-Defense Command Post (AADCP) SL-47DC for Nike Missile air-defense system, St. Louis Defense Area in 1959 at Belleville. During 1962 Belleville AFS joined the Semi Automatic Ground Environment (SAGE) system, feeding data to DC-07 at Truax Field, Wisconsin. After joining, the squadron was redesignated as the 798th Radar Squadron (SAGE) on 1 March 1962. The radar squadron provided information 24/7 the SAGE Direction Center where it was analyzed to determine range, direction altitude speed and whether or not aircraft were friendly or hostile. On 31 July 1963, the site was redesignated as NORAD ID Z-70. In 1963 two AN/FPS-6 height-finder radars also stood guard. Later, during the mid-1960s, this site operated with an AN/FPS-66 search radar.

In addition to the main facility, Belleville operated five unmanned AN/FPS-18 Gap Filler sites:

- Edgewood, MO (P-70B) 39°19′17″N 091°09′08″W
- Vichy, MO (P-70C) 38°08′08″N 091°46′24″W
- Marquand, MO (P-70D) 37°27′49″N 090°12′37″W
- Neoga, IL (P-70F) 39°20′15″N 088°23′48″W
- Bowling Green, MO (P-70G) 39°21′55″N 091°12′43″W

The 798th Radar Squadron was discontinued along with the Army Command Post on 18 June 1968; the station was closed on 30 June. Today the former radar station has been redeveloped into a vocational rehabilitation center. Most of the former military buildings are still in use. There is a small memorial on the site for its military use.

== Air Force units and assignments ==
=== Units ===
- Constituted as the 798th Aircraft Control and Warning Squadron

Activated on 1 May 1951
Redesignated as 798th Radar Squadron (SAGE) on 1 March 1962
Discontinued and inactivated on 18 June 1968

=== Assignments ===
- 546th Aircraft Control and Warning Group, 1 May 1951
- 159th Aircraft Control and Warning Group, 1 June 1951
- 33d Air Division, 6 February 1952
- 20th Air Division, 1 March 1956
- Kansas City Air Defense Sector, 1 January 1960
- Chicago Air Defense Sector, 1 July 1961
- 20th Air Division, 1 April 1966
- 30th Air Division, 1 December 1967 – 18 June 1968

== See also ==
- List of USAF Aerospace Defense Command General Surveillance Radar Stations
- List of United States Air Force aircraft control and warning squadrons
