= Air Defense Sector =

Air Defense Sector may refer to:

== Regional air defense sectors ==
- Eastern Air Defense Sector (1956—1966, 1987—), headquartered at Griffiss Business and Technology Park, the former Griffiss Air Force Base, in Rome, New York
- Southwest Air Defense Sector (1987–1994), an inactive United States Air Force organization, last headquartered at March Air Force Base, California
- Southeast Air Defense Sector (1987–2006), a unit of the US Air Force, last headquartered at Tyndall Air Force Base near Panama City, Florida
- Western Air Defense Sector (1958–), a unit of the Washington Air National Guard, headquartered at Joint Base Lewis-McChord, Tacoma, Washington

== Air defense sectors named for metropolitan areas ==
=== Canada ===
- Goose Air Defense Sector (1963-1966), last headquartered at Goose Air Force Base, Labrador, Canada

=== United States ===
(by state)

- Phoenix Air Defense Sector (1960-1966), last headquartered at Luke Air Force Base, Arizona
- San Francisco Air Defense Sector (1959–1963), last headquartered at Beale Air Force Base, California
- Denver Air Defense Sector (1959), a SAGE sector in the Rocky Mountain division, Colorado
- Sioux City Air Defense Sector (1961–1966), last headquartered at Sioux City Air Force Station, Iowa
- Bangor Air Defense Sector (1958–1966), last headquartered at Topsham Air Force Station, Maine
- Albuquerque Air Defense Sector (1950, 1960), last headquartered at Kirtland Air Force Base, New Mexico
- Detroit Air Defense Sector (1957–1966), last headquartered at Custer Air Force Station, Michigan
- Sault Sainte Marie Air Defense Sector (1958–1966), last headquartered at K.I. Sawyer Air Force Base, Michigan
- Duluth Air Defense Sector (1959–1966), last headquartered at Duluth Airport, Minnesota
- Kansas City Air Defense Sector (1961–1962), last headquartered at Richards-Gebaur Air Force Base, Missouri
- Great Falls Air Defense Sector (1959-1966), last headquartered at Malmstrom Air Force Base, Montana
- Reno Air Defense Sector (1959–1966), last headquartered at Stead Air Force Base, Nevada
- Boston Air Defense Sector (1956-1966), last headquartered at Hancock Field, New York
- Syracuse Air Defense Sector (1956–1963), last headquartered at Hancock Field, New York
- Grand Forks Air Defense Sector (1957-1963), last headquartered at Grand Forks Air Force Base, North Dakota
- Minot Air Defense Sector (1959-1963), last headquartered at Minot Air Force Base, North Dakota
- Oklahoma City Air Defense Sector (1960–1966), last headquartered at Oklahoma City Air Force Station, Oklahoma
- Portland Air Defense Sector (1948-1966), last headquartered at Adair Air Force Station, Oregon
- Washington Air Defense Sector (1956–1966), headquartered at Fort Lee Air Force Station, Virginia
- Spokane Air Defense Sector (1958–1963), last headquartered at Larson Air Force Base, Washington
- Chicago Air Defense Sector (1957–1966), last headquartered at Truax Field, Wisconsin

== See also ==
- Air Defense Command
