= Sioux City Air Defense Sector =

Sioux City Air Defense Sector

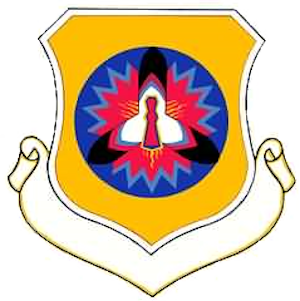
- Emblem of the Sioux City Air Defense Sector
- Active: 1961–1966
- Country: United States
- Branch: United States Air Force
- Role: Air Defense
- Part of: Air Defense Command

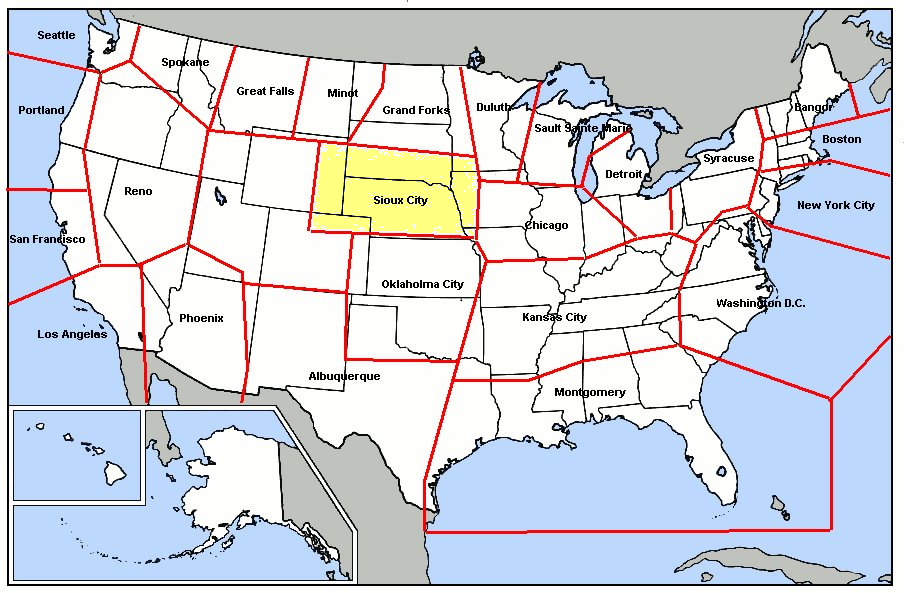
Map of Sioux City ADS

The Sioux City Air Defense Sector (SCADS) is an inactive United States Air Force organization. Its last assignment was with the Air Defense Command 29th Air Division, being stationed at Sioux City Air Force Station, Iowa.

== History ==
SCADS was established in October 1958 assuming control of former ADC Central Air Defense Force units in western Iowa, most of Nebraska along with southern South Dakota. Also provided air defense over parts of Minnesota, Colorado and Wyoming. The organization provided command and control over several aircraft and radar squadrons.

On 1 December 1961, the new Semi Automatic Ground Environment (SAGE) Direction Center (DC-22) became operational. 42°23′51″N 096°22′25″W DC-22 was equipped with dual AN/FSQ-7 Computers. The day-to-day operations of the command was to train and maintain tactical flying units flying jet interceptor aircraft (F-94 Starfire; F-102 Delta Dagger; F-106 Delta Dart) in a state of readiness with training missions and series of exercises with SAC and other units simulating interceptions of incoming enemy aircraft.

The Sector was inactivated on 1 April 1966 as part of an ADC consolidation and reorganization, and its units were reassigned to the 30th Air Division.

=== Lineage ===
- Established as Sioux City Air Defense Sector on 1 October 1959

Inactivated on 1 April 1966

=== Assignments ===
- 20th Air Division, 1 October 1959
- 33d Air Division, 1 January 1960
- 29th Air Division, 1 July 1961 – 1 April 1966

=== Stations ===
- Sioux City Air Force Station, Iowa, 1 October 1959 – 1 April 1966

=== Components ===
==== Wing ====
- 328th Fighter Wing (Air Defense)

Richards-Gebaur AFB, Missouri, 1 July 1961 – 1 April 1966

==== Radar Squadrons ====
- 625th Radar Squadron

Hastings AFS, Nebraska, 1 January 1962 – 1 April 1966

- 695th Radar Squadron

Pickstown AFS, South Dakota, 16 April 1961 – 1 April 1966

- 731st Radar Squadron

Sundance AFS, Wyoming, 25 June 1963 – 1 April 1966

- 738th Radar Squadron

Olathe AFS, Kansas, 1 July 1961 – 1 April 1966

- 787th Radar Squadron

Chandler AFS, Minnesota, 4 September 1963 – 1 April 1966

- 789th Radar Squadron

Omaha AFS, Nebraska, 1 July 1961 – 1 April 1966

- 793d Radar Squadron

Hutchinson AFS, Kansas, 1 July 1961 – 1 April 1966

- 903d Radar Squadron

Gettysburg AFS, South Dakota, 4 September 1963 – 1 April 1966

== See also ==
- List of USAF Aerospace Defense Command General Surveillance Radar Stations
- Aerospace Defense Command Fighter Squadrons
