= 20th Air Division =

20th Air Division

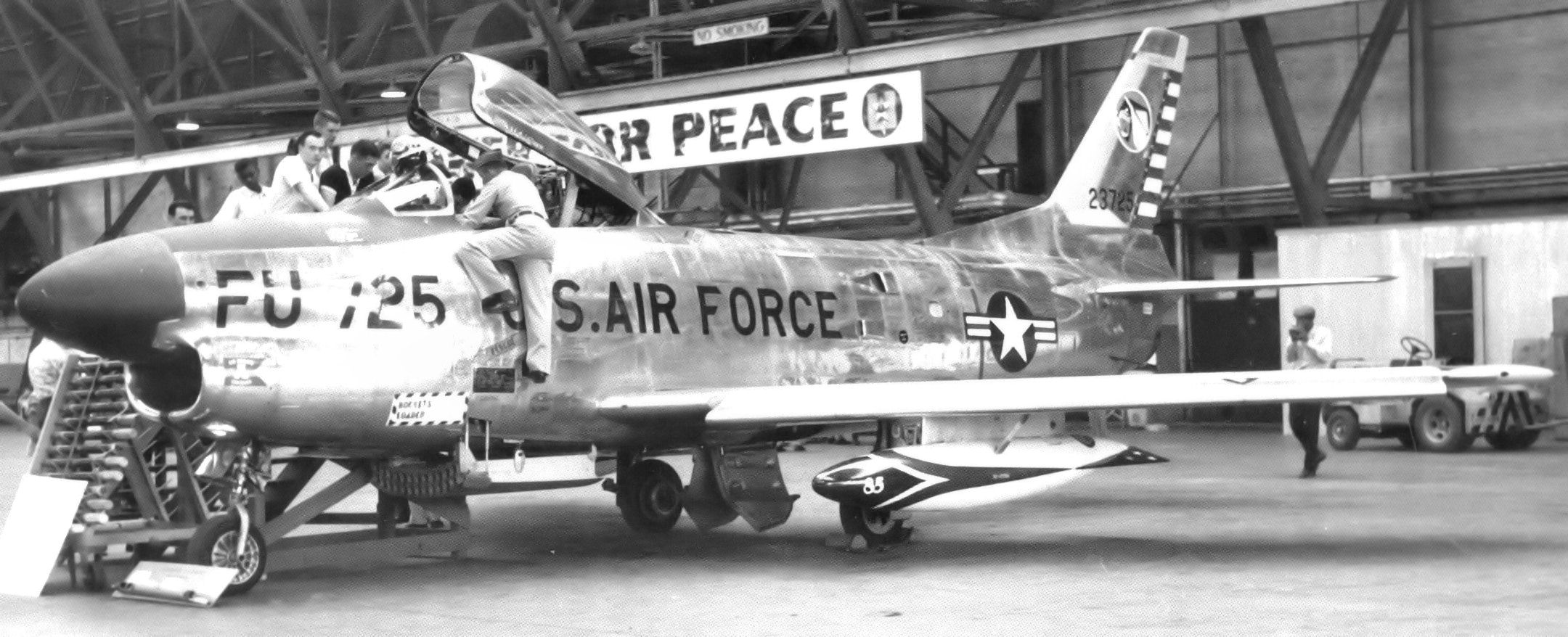
- F-86D Sabre of the 20th Air Division's 85th Fighter-Interceptor Squadron at Scott AFB in 1957
- Active: 1955–1960; 1966–1967; 1969–1983
- Country: United States
- Branch: United States Air Force
- Role: Command of air defense forces
- Part of: Tactical Air Command

Insignia
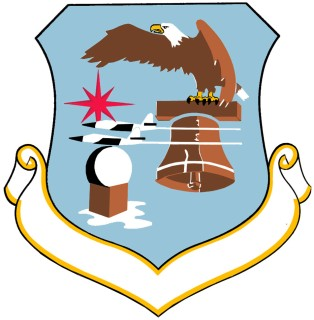
- 20th Air Division Emblem (approved 20 August 1956)

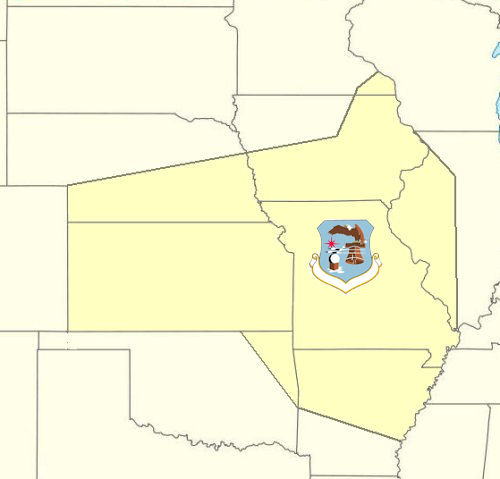
20th Air Division ADC AOR 1955–1960

The 20th Air Division is an inactive United States Air Force organization. Its last assignment was with Tactical Air Command at Tyndall Air Force Base, Florida where it was inactivated on 1 March 1983.

During most of the division's history it served with Air Defense Command as a regional command and control headquarters. Between 1955 and 1967 the division controlled air defense units in the central United States. It controlled a slightly different areas of the midwestern US from 1955 to 1960 and again from 1966 to 1967. Its area of responsibility shifted to the east coast if the United States from 1969 to 1983. It was shifted to its final station on paper in 1983 and was immediately inactivated.

== History ==
The 20th Air Division was assigned to Air Defense Command (ADC) for most of its existence. It served as a regional command and control headquarters, controlling fighter interceptor and radar units over several areas of responsibility during the Cold War. For three years it also commanded a surface-to-air missile squadron.

The division was initially activated as an intermediate command organization under Central Air Defense Force at Grandview Air Force Base (later Richards-Gebaur Air Force Base) in June 1955. The division was responsible for the interceptor and radar units within an area that covered parts of Nebraska, Oklahoma, Arkansas, Illinois, Iowa, and virtually all of Kansas and Missouri.

On 1 October 1959 ADC activated the Sioux City Air Defense Sector and its Semi Automatic Ground Environment (SAGE) DC-22 Direction Center and assigned it to the division. The 20th also operated a Manual Control Center (MCC-2) at Richards-Gebaur. The division was inactivated in 1960 when ADC reorganized its regional air defense units, and the 33d Air Division assumed command of most of its former units.

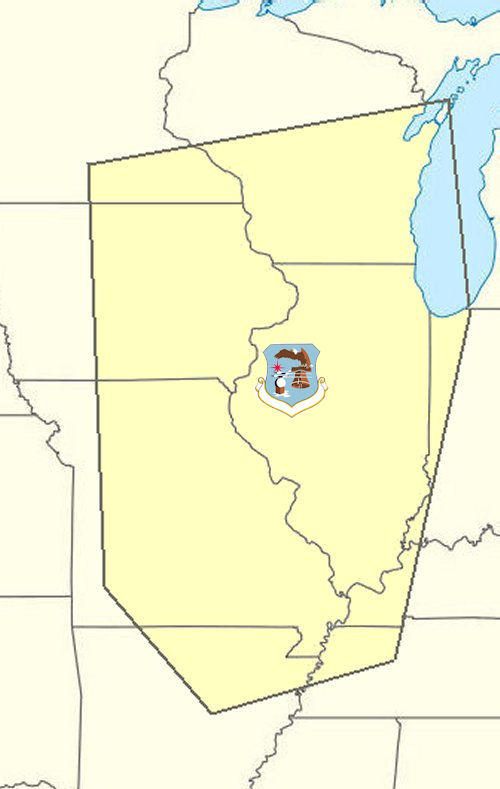
20th Air Division ADC AOR 1966–1967

The division was reactivated in 1966 under Tenth Air Force as a SAGE organization, replacing the Chicago Air Defense Sector when ADC discontinued its air defense sectors and replaced them with air divisions. The 20th provided air defense from the Truax Field, Wisconsin DC-7/CC-2 SAGE blockhouse for parts of Wisconsin, Minnesota, Iowa, Missouri, Arkansas, Tennessee, Kentucky, Indiana, and all of Illinois. The division also acted as the 20th NORAD Region after activation of the North American Air Defense Command (NORAD) Combat Operations Center at the Cheyenne Mountain Complex, Colorado. Operational control of the division was transferred to NORAD from ADC.

In addition to the active duty interceptor and radar units, the division supervised Air National Guard units that flew interception sorties using (among other aircraft) McDonnell F-101 Voodoos and Convair F-106 Delta Darts. At the same time the division controlled numerous radar squadrons. It was inactivated in 1967 as part of an ADC consolidation of intermediate level command and control organizations, driven by budget reductions required to fund USAF operations in Southeast Asia.

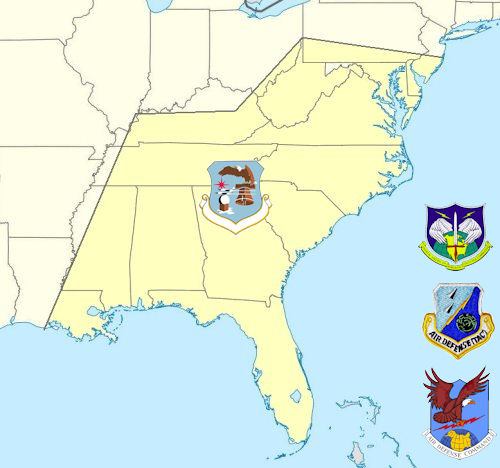
20th Air Division/NORAD Region ADC AOR 1969–1983

The 20th Air Division was activated for a third time in November 1969 under Aerospace Defense Command (ADCOM). The division provided air defense for virtually all of the southeastern United States, except for most of Louisiana from the SAGE DC-4 blockhouse at Fort Lee Air Force Station, Virginia. The division also controlled a CIM-10 Bomarc surface-to-air anti-aircraft missile squadron near Langley Air Force Base until the squadron's inactivation in October 1972.

ADCOM was inactivated on 1 October 1979. The atmospheric defense resources (interceptors and warning radars) of ADCOM were reassigned to Tactical Air Command, which formed Air Defense, Tactical Air Command as the headquarters to control them. After 1981, the division controlled units equipped with McDonnell Douglas F-15 Eagle aircraft. Its subordinate units continued to participate in intensive academic training, numerous multi-region simulated (non-flying) exercises, and flying exercises.

The division moved to Tyndall Air Force Base, Florida in March 1983 where it was inactivated and its mission, personnel and equipment were transferred to the Southeast Air Defense Sector.

== Lineage ==
- Established as the 20 Air Division (Defense) on 8 June 1955

Activated on 8 October 1955
Inactivated on 1 January 1960

- Activated on 20 January 1966 (not organized)

Organized on 1 April 1966
Discontinued and inactivated, on 31 December 1967

- Activated on 19 November 1969

Inactivated on 1 March 1983

=== Assignments ===
- Central Air Defense Force, 8 October 1955 – 1 January 1960
- Air Defense Command, 20 January 1966
- Tenth Air Force, 1 April 1966 – 31 December 1967
- Aerospace Defense Command, 19 November 1969
- Air Defense, Tactical Air Command, 1 October 1979 – 1 March 1983

=== Stations ===
- Grandview Air Force Base (later, Richards Gebaur Air Force Base0, Missouri, 8 October 1955 – 1 January 1960
- Truax Field, Wisconsin, 1 April 1966 – 31 December 1967
- Fort Lee Air Force Station, Virginia, 19 November 1969
- Tyndall Air Force Base, Florida, 1 March 1983

=== Components ===
==== Sector ====
- Sioux City Air Defense Sector: 1 October 1959 – 1 January 1960

==== Groups ====
- 53d Fighter Group: 1 March 1956 – 1 January 1960

Sioux Gateway Airport, Iowa

- 327th Fighter Group: 1 April 19–25 April June 1966

Truax Field, Wisconsin

- 328th Fighter Group: 1 March 1956 – 1 January 1960

Richards-Gebaur Air Force Base, Missouri

- 678th Air Defense Group: 1 March 1970 – 1 March 1983

Tyndall Air Force Base, Florida

- 701st Air Defense Group: 1 March 1970 – 17 January 1974

Fort Fisher Air Force Station, North Carolina

==== Squadrons ====
===== Fighter-Interceptor =====
- 48th Fighter-Interceptor Squadron: 19 November 1969 – 1 March 1983

Langley Air Force Base, Virginia

- 85th Fighter-Interceptor Squadron: 1 March 1956 – 1 July 1959

Scott Air Force Base, Illinois

- 95th Fighter-Interceptor Squadron: 19 November 1969 – 31 January 1973

Dover Air Force Base, Delaware

===== Missile =====
- 22d Air Defense Missile Squadron (BOMARC): 19 November 1969 – 31 October 1972

Langley Air Force Base, Virginia

===== Radar =====
- 20th Air Defense Squadron (SAGE), 1 January 1975 – 1 October 1979
- 630th Radar Squadron, 1 August 1972 – 31 December 1977

Houston Intercontinental Airport, Texas

- 632d Radar Squadron, 19 November 1969 – 30 September 1978

Roanoke Rapids Air Force Station, North Carolina

- 634th Radar Squadron, 1 January 1973 – 1 July 1974

Lake Charles Air Force Station, Louisiana

- 635th Radar Squadron, 1 January 1973 – 1 June 1974

Dauphin Island Air Force Station, Alabama

- 644th Radar Squadron, 19 November 1969 – 1 April 1978

Homestead Air Force Base, Florida

- 645th Radar Squadron, 19 November 1969 – 1 April 1976

Patrick Air Force Base, Florida

- 649th Radar Squadron, 19 November 1969 – 30 June 1975

Bedford Air Force Station, Virginia

- 650th Aircraft Control and Warning Squadron, 1 March 1956 – 8 October 1957

Dallas Center Air Force Station, Iowa

- 657th Radar Squadron, 19 November 1969 – 30 September 1970

Bedford Air Force Station, Virginia

- 660th Radar Squadron, 19 November 1969 – 15 November 1980

MacDill Air Force Base, Florida

- 671st Radar Squadron, 19 November 1969 – 30 September 1979

NAS Key West, Florida

- 676th Radar Squadron, 1 April 1966 – 1 December 1967

Antigo Air Force Station, Wisconsin

- 678th Radar Squadron, 19 November 1969 – 1 March 1970

Tyndall Air Force Base, Florida

- 679th Radar Squadron, 19 November 1969 – 1 February 1974

NAS Jacksonville, Florida

- 680th Radar Squadron, 19 November 1969 – 30 May 1970

Palermo Air Force Station, New Jersey

- 691st Radar Squadron, 19 November 1969 – 30 September 1970

Cross City Air Force Station, Florida

- 693d Radar Squadron, 19 November 1969 – 30 September 1970

Dauphin Island Air Force Station, Florida

- 701st Radar Squadron, 1 April 1966 – 1 March 1970

Fort Fisher Air Force Station, North Carolina

- 702d Radar Squadron, 19 November 1969 – 9 June 1979

Savannah Air Force Station, Georgia

- 725th Aircraft Control and Warning Squadron, 1 March 1956 – 1 January 1960

Walnut Ridge Air Force Station, Arkansas

- 738th Aircraft Control and Warning Squadron, 1 March 1956 – 1 January 1960

Olathe Air Force Station, Kansas

- 755th Radar Squadron, 1 April 1966 – 1 December 1967

Williams Bay Air Force Station, Wisconsin

- 770th Radar Squadron, 19 November 1969 – 1 February 1974

Fort George G. Meade, Maryland

- 771st Radar Squadron, 19 November 1969 – 1 February 1974

Cape Charles Air Force Station, Virginia

- 782d Radar Squadron, 1 April-25 June 1966

Rockville Air Force Station, Indiana

- 787th Aircraft Control and Warning Squadron, 1 January 1959 – 1 January 1960

Chandler Air Force Station, Minnesota

- 788th Aircraft Control and Warning (later Radar) Squadron, 1 March 1956 – 15 October 1958; 1 April 1966 – 1 December 1967

Waverly Air Force Station, Iowa

- 789th Aircraft Control and Warning Squadron, 1 March 1956 – 1 January 1960

Omaha Air Force Station, Nebraska

- 790th Aircraft Control and Warning (later Radar) Squadron, 1 March 1956 – 1 April 1959; 1 April 1966 – 1 December 1967

Kirksville Air Force Station, Missouri

- 791st Aircraft Control and Warning (later Radar) Squadron, 1 March 1956 – 15 October 1958; 1 April 1966 – 1 December 1967

Hanna City Air Force Station, Illinois

- 792d Radar Squadron, 19 November 1969 – 8 December 1978

North Charleston Air Force Station, South Carolina

- 793d Aircraft Control and Warning Squadron, 1 March 1956 – 1 January 1960

Hutchinson Air Force Station, Kansas

- 796th Aircraft Control and Warning Squadron, 1 March 1956 – 1 June 1961

Bartlesville Air Force Station, Oklahoma

- 797th Aircraft Control and Warning Squadron, 1 March 1956 – 1 June 1961

Fordland Air Force Station, Missouri

- 798th Aircraft Control and Warning (later Radar) Squadron, 1 March 1956 – 1 January 1960

Belleville Air Force Station, Illinois

- 810th Radar Squadron, 19 November 1969 – 31 July 1978

Winston-Salem Air Force Station, North Carolina

- 861st Radar Squadron, 19 November 1969 – 30 June 1975

Aiken Air Force Station, South Carolina

- 4638th Air Defense Squadron (SAGE), 1 January 1972 – 1 January 1975

=== Aircraft and Missiles ===
- North American F-86 Sabre, 1956–1959
- Northrop F-89 Scorpion, 1956–1957
- McDonnell F-101 Voodoo, 1959–1960
- Convair F-102 Delta Dagger, 1957–1960
- Convair F-106 Delta Dart, 1969–1981
- CIM-10 BOMARC, 1969–1972; F-15, 1981–1983

== See also ==
- F-89 Scorpion units of the United States Air Force
- List of Sabre and Fury units in the US military
- List of F-106 Delta Dart units of the United States Air Force
- List of United States Air Force Aerospace Defense Command Interceptor Squadrons
- United States general surveillance radar stations
