= Rolla National Airport =

Rolla National Airport (formerly Vichy Army Airfield)
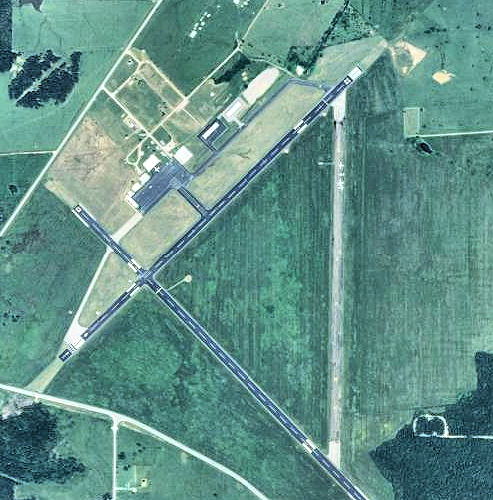
- IATA: VIH; ICAO: KVIH; FAA LID: VIH

Summary
- Airport type: Public
- Owner: City of Rolla
- Serves: Rolla / Vichy, Missouri
- Location: Maries County, Missouri
- Elevation AMSL: 1,148 ft (350 m)
- Coordinates: 38°07′39″N 091°46′10″W
- Website: www.RollaCity.org/...

Map
- Location of airport in Missouri

Runways
Direction	Length		Surface
Direction	ft	m	Surface
4/22	5,500	1,676	Asphalt
13/31	5,500	1,676	Asphalt

Statistics (2010)
- Aircraft operations: 10,570
- Based aircraft: 68
- Source: Federal Aviation Administration

Rolla National Airport (IATA: VIH, ICAO: KVIH, FAA LID: VIH) is a public use airport in Maries County, Missouri, United States. It is owned by the City of Rolla (in adjacent Phelps County) and located 11 nautical miles (13 mi, 20 km) north of its central business district. The airport is one nautical mile (2 km) northwest of Vichy, Missouri. It is included in the National Plan of Integrated Airport Systems for 2011–2015, which categorized it as a general aviation facility.

== History ==
The airport was originally built by the United States Army Air Forces in 1942 as a sub-base for Sedalia Army Air Field during World War II. It was designated as Vichy Army Airfield, and was used by I Troop Carrier Command for training. The Third Air Force 76th Reconnaissance Group operated L-1 Vigilant and L-4 Grasshopper light observation aircraft from the airfield in the spring of 1943 in support of Army training at Fort Leonard Wood.

The airfield was vacated by the Air Force in March 1946; however, it was re-activated by the United States Navy, which used it as an Outlying Field (OLF) for Naval Air Station St. Louis. When the Navy ended its use, it was deeded to the city of Rolla in 1957 and became Rolla National Airport.

In August 1959, the USAF Air Defense Command established site "P-70C (later Z-70C)" at the airport. It was an Air Defense Radar Gap-Filler Annex, equipped with a Bendix AN/FPS-18 Radar medium-range search radar 38°08′08″N 091°46′24″W, assigned to the 798th Radar Squadron, Belleville AFS, Illinois. The station was inactivated in late 1968. Both building and radar tower (but now without radome) are still extant. The radome was removed in November 2011.

The facility was struck by an EF2 tornado on April 15, 2023; multiple hangars were damaged.

== Facilities and aircraft ==
Rolla National Airport covers an area of 1,370 acres (554 ha) at an elevation of 1,148 feet (350 m) above mean sea level. It has two runways, designated 4/22 and 13/31, each with an asphalt surface measuring 5,500 by 100 feet (1,676 x 30 m).

For the 12-month period ending March 31, 2010, the airport had 10,570 aircraft operations, an average of 28 per day: 95% general aviation, 3% air taxi, and 2% military. At that time there were 68 aircraft based at this airport: 85% single-engine and 15% multi-engine.

== See also ==
- Missouri World War II Army Airfields
