= Bartlesville Air Force Station =

Bartlesville Air Force Station
- Part of Air Defense Command (ADC)

Site information
- Type: Air Force Station
- Controlled by: United States Air Force

Location
- Location of Bartlesville AFS, Oklahoma
- Coordinates: 36°45′44″N 096°02′18″W

Site history
- Built: 1951
- In use: 1951–1961

Garrison information
- Garrison: 796th Aircraft Control and Warning Squadron

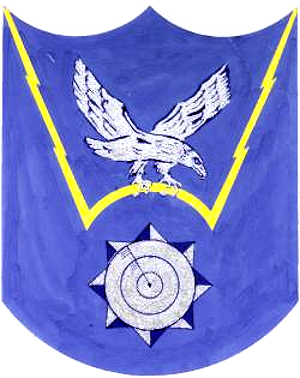
Emblem of the 796th Aircraft Control and Warning

Bartlesville Air Force Station (ADC ID: P-77) is a closed United States Air Force General Surveillance Radar station. It is located 3.2 miles (5.1 km) west-northwest of Bartlesville, Oklahoma. It was closed in 1961.

== History ==
In late 1951 Air Defense Command selected Bartlesville, OK as a site for one of twenty-eight radar stations built as part of the second segment of the permanent radar surveillance network. Prompted by the start of the Korean War, on 11 July 1950, the Secretary of the Air Force asked the Secretary of Defense for approval to expedite construction of the second segment of the permanent network. Receiving the Defense Secretary's approval on 21 July, the Air Force directed the Corps of Engineers to proceed with construction.

On 1 May 1951 the 796th Aircraft Control and Warning Squadron began operating a pair of AN/FPS-10 radars, and initially the station functioned as a Ground-Control Intercept (GCI) and warning station. As a GCI station, the squadron's role was to guide interceptor aircraft toward unidentified intruders picked up on the unit's radar scopes. In 1958 an AN/FPS-6 replaced the AN/FPS-10 height-finder radar.

In addition to the main facility, Bartlesville operated two AN/FPS-14 Gap Filler site:

- Ottawa, OK (P-77A) 36°51′37″N 094°47′08″W
- Winfield, KS (P-77D) 37°12′47″N 096°57′00″W

This site was inactivated 1 June 1961 due to budgetary constraints. Today what was Bartlesville Air Force Station is largely obliterated. It now consists of various residential and commercial establishments.

== Air Force units and assignments ==
=== Units ===
- Constituted as the 796th Aircraft Control and Warning Squadron

Activated on 1 May 1951
Discontinued and inactivated on 1 June 1961

=== Assignments ===
- 546th Aircraft Control and Warning Group, 1 May 1951
- 159th Aircraft Control and Warning Group, 4 June 1951
- 33d Air Division, 6 February 1952
- 20th Air Division, 1 March 1956
- Kansas City Air Defense Sector, 1 January 1960 – 1 June 1961

== See also ==
- List of United States Air Force aircraft control and warning squadrons
- United States general surveillance radar stations
