= Pickstown Air Force Station =

Pickstown Air Force Station
- Part of Air Defense Command (ADC)

Site information
- Type: Air Force Station
- Controlled by: United States Air Force

Location
- Location of Pickstown AFS, South Dakota
- Coordinates: 43°04′59″N 098°28′31″W

Site history
- Built: 1961
- In use: 1961-1968

Garrison information
- Garrison: 695th Radar Squadron

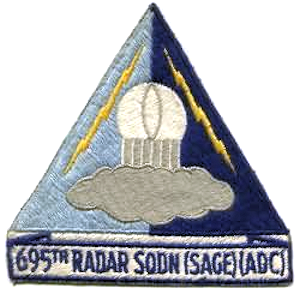
Emblem of the 695th Radar Squadron

Pickstown Air Force Station (ADC ID: SM-134, NORAD ID: Z-134) is a closed United States Air Force General Surveillance Radar station. It is located 3.1 miles (5.0 km) east-northeast of Pickstown, South Dakota. It was closed in 1968.

== History ==
Pickstown Air Force Station was initially part of Phase II of the Air Defense Command Mobile Radar program. The Air Force approved this expansion of the Mobile Radar program on 23 October 1952. Radars in this network were designated "SM."

The station became operational with the activation of the 695th Radar Squadron (SAGE) on 18 April 1961. The squadron was equipped with AN/FPS-66 and a pair of AN/FPS-6 radars. It fed data to DC-22 at Sioux City AFS, Iowa. The radar squadron provided information 24/7 the SAGE Direction Center where it was analyzed to determine range, direction altitude speed and whether or not aircraft were friendly or hostile.

The radars were operated until 1968 when Air Defense Command closed the station as part of a draw down of assets and budget reductions. Today, what was Pickstown AFS has been completely redeveloped. It is now Fort Randall Casino & Hotel operated by the Yankton Sioux Tribe.

== Air Force units and assignments ==
Units:

- 695th Radar Squadron (SAGE), Activated on 16 April 1961

Inactivated on 8 September 1968

Assignments:

- Sioux City Air Defense Sector, 16 April 1961
- 30th Air Division, 1 April 1966 – 8 September 1968

== See also ==
- List of USAF Aerospace Defense Command General Surveillance Radar Stations
