= Omaha Air Force Station =

Closed United States Air Force General Surveillance Radar station

Omaha Air Force Station
- Part of Air Defense Command (ADC)

Site information
- Type: Air Force Station
- Controlled by: United States Air Force

Location
- Location of Omaha AFS, Nebraska
- Coordinates: 41°21′39″N 096°01′28″W

Site history
- Built: 1951
- In use: 1951–1968

Garrison information
- Garrison: 789th Aircraft Control and Warning (later Radar) Squadron

Omaha Air Force Station (ADC ID: P-71, NORAD ID: Z-71) is a closed United States Air Force General Surveillance Radar station. It is located 7.5 miles (12.1 km) north of Omaha, Nebraska. It was closed in 1968.

== History ==
Omaha Air Force Station was one of twenty-eight stations built as part of the second segment of the Air Defense Command permanent radar network. Prompted by the start of the Korean War, on 11 July 1950, the Secretary of the Air Force asked the Secretary of Defense for approval to expedite construction of the permanent network. Receiving the Defense Secretary's approval on 21 July, the Air Force directed the Corps of Engineers to proceed with construction.

The 789th Aircraft Control and Warning Squadron was activated at the station on 1 May 1951. The squadron first operated an AN/CPS-4 and AN/FPS-3 radar at Omaha in April 1952, and initially the station functioned as a Ground-Control Intercept (GCI) and warning station. As a GCI station, the squadron's role was to guide interceptor aircraft toward unidentified intruders picked up on the unit's radar. Eventually the Air Force replaced the height-finder radar with an AN/FPS-6, and replaced the AN/FPS-3 search radar with an AN/FPS-20. In late 1959 this station was also performing air traffic control duties for the FAA.

An Army Air-Defense Command Post (AADCP) was established at Omaha AFS in 1959 for Nike missile command-and-control functions as part of the Offutt AFB Defense Area. The site was equipped with the AN/GSG-5(V) BIRDIE solid-state computer system. The Army Nike radars were fully integrated with the Air Force sets. Semi Automatic Ground Environment (SAGE) operations began in 1961, initially feeding data to DC-08 at Richards-Gebaur AFB, Missouri. After joining, the squadron was redesignated as the 789th Radar Squadron (SAGE) on 1 January 1962. The radar squadron provided information 24x7 to the SAGE Direction Center where it was analyzed to determine range, direction altitude speed and whether or not aircraft were friendly or hostile. A second height-finder radar (AN/FPS-6A) was installed in 1962. On 31 July 1963, the site was redesignated as NORAD ID Z-71.

In addition to the main facility, Omaha AFS operated one AN/FPS-18 "Gap Filler" site:

- Dallas Center AFS, IA (P-71D) 41°43′05″N 093°54′19″W

Dallas Center was taken over in 1957 after its closure as M-122. It was operated until its final closure in December 1967.

In 1964 the AN/FPS-20A radar was upgraded to become an AN/FPS-66, then updated again to an AN/FPS-66A in 1967. The 789th Radar Squadron (SAGE) was inactivated 8 September 1968, and the search radar was transferred to the FAA. Omaha AFS is an FAA site, using the Air Force AN/FPS-66A radar as part of the NAS Defense Program until February 2014. The FPS was decommissioned at that time, and replaced by the Common Air Route Surveillance Radar (CARSR).

== Air Force units and assignments ==
=== Units ===
- Constituted as the 789th Aircraft Control and Warning Squadron

Activated on 1 May 1951
Redesignated as 789th Radar Squadron (SAGE) on 1 January 1962
Discontinued and inactivated on 8 September 1968

=== Assignments ===
- 543d Aircraft Control and Warning Group, 1 May 1951
- 31st Air Division, 6 February 1952
- 20th Air Division, 1 March 1956
- Kansas City Air Defense Sector, 1 July 1961
- 30th Air Division, 1 April 1966 – 8 September 1968

== See also ==
- List of United States Air Force aircraft control and warning squadrons
- United States general surveillance radar stations
