= Walnut Ridge Air Force Station =

Closed United States Air Force General Surveillance Radar station

Walnut Ridge Air Force Station
- Part of Air Defense Command (ADC)

Site information
- Type: Air Force Station
- Controlled by: United States Air Force

Location
- Location of Walnut Ridge AFS, Arkansas
- Coordinates: 36°07′48″N 090°55′09″W

Site history
- Built: 1956
- In use: 1956-1963

Garrison information
- Garrison: 725th Aircraft Control and Warning (later Radar) Squadron

Walnut Ridge Air Force Station (ADC ID: SM-143) is a closed United States Air Force General Surveillance Radar station. It is located 4.7 miles (7.6 km) north-northeast of Walnut Ridge, Arkansas. It was closed in 1963.

== History ==
Walnut Ridge Air Force Station was one of many radar installations conceived as part of Phase II of the Air Defense Command's Mobile Radar program. The Air Force approved this expansion of the Mobile Radar program on October 23, 1952.

The United States Air Force Air Defense Command established a Mobile Radar site at Walnut Ridge Regional Airport in 1956, designating it Walnut Ridge Air Force Station, and designating it as SM-143. The facility was originally constructed in 1943 and had formerly served as an Army Air Corps Pilot School during WW2. The government formally announced the construction of the $500k, 200 personnel radar facility on January 14, 1955, and construction was underway by May of that year. By January of the following year, the first Air Force personnel arrived at Walnut Ridge, and the 725th Aircraft Control and Warning Squadron was transferred from Tinker AFB, OK on 1 July and began operating an AN/MPS-11 radar set at the station. Initially the station functioned as a Ground-Control Intercept (GCI) and warning station. As a GCI station, the squadron's role was to guide interceptor aircraft toward unidentified intruders picked up on the unit's radar scopes.

In 1958 an AN/FPS-6 replaced the AN/FPS-4 height-finder radar that had been installed a year earlier, and a second AN/FPS-6 was added subsequently. During 1962 Walnut Ridge AFS joined the Semi Automatic Ground Environment (SAGE) system, feeding data to DC-07 at Truax Field, Wisconsin. After joining, the squadron was re-designated as the 725th Radar Squadron (SAGE) on 1 May 1962. The radar squadron provided information 24/7 the SAGE Direction Center where it was analyzed to determine range, direction altitude speed and whether or not aircraft were friendly or hostile.

In March 1963 the Air Force ordered this site to close. Operations ceased on 1 August 1963 and the 725th Radar Squadron was inactivated.

With its closure, Walnut Ridge was determined to be excess by the military and turned over to the local government for civil use. Today, the Air Force radar site is part of the civil airport (formerly Marine Corps Air Facility Walnut Ridge), and the Williams Baptist College. Most of the USAF buildings are still in use, some by the college and some by Southwest Airlines, which has established a training facility at the site.

== Air Force units and assignments ==
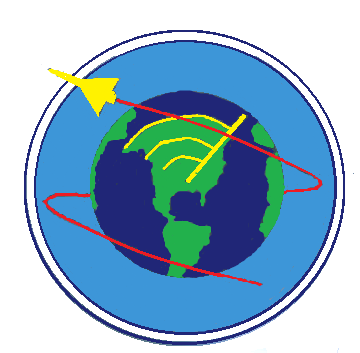
725th Aircraft Control & Warning Sq (later 725th Radar Squadron) emblem

=== Units ===
- 725th Aircraft Control and Warning Squadron, activated at Tinker AFB, Oklahoma, 8 April 1955

Moved to Walnut Ridge Air Force Station, 1 July 1956
Redesignated 725th Radar Squadron (SAGE), 1 May 1962
Discontinued, 1 August 1963

=== Assignments ===
- 33d Air Division, 8 April 1955
- 20th Air Division, 1 March 1956
- Kansas City Air Defense Sector, 1 January 1960
- Chicago Air Defense Sector, 1 July 1961 – 1 August 1963

== See also ==
- List of USAF Aerospace Defense Command General Surveillance Radar Stations
