= Chandler Air Force Station =

Closed radar station in Minnesota, US

Chandler Air Force Station
- Part of Air Defense Command (ADC)

Site information
- Type: Air Force Station
- Code: ADC ID: P-18, NORAD ID: Z-18
- Controlled by: United States Air Force

Location
- Location of Chandler AFS, Minnesota
- Coordinates: 43°53′52″N 095°56′45″W

Site history
- Built: 1951
- In use: 1951–1969

Garrison information
- Garrison: 787th Aircraft Control and Warning Squadron

Chandler Air Force Station is a closed United States Air Force General Surveillance Radar station. It is 2.2 miles (3.5 km) south of Chandler, Minnesota, on the Buffalo Ridge in section 13 of Moulton Township, Murray County. It was closed in 1969.

== History ==
In late 1951 Air Defense Command selected the site as one of 28 radar stations built as part of the second segment of the permanent radar surveillance network. Prompted by the start of the Korean War, on July 11, 1950, the Secretary of the Air Force asked the Secretary of Defense for approval to expedite construction of the second segment of the permanent network. Receiving the Defense Secretary's approval on July 21, the Air Force directed the Corps of Engineers to proceed with construction.

The 787th Aircraft Control and Warning Squadron was activated at Moulton, MN on 27 June 1951. The site was equipped with AN/FPS-3 and AN/FPS-4 radars, and initially the station functioned as a Ground-Control Intercept (GCI) and warning station. As a GCI station, the squadron's role was to guide interceptor aircraft toward unidentified intruders detected by the unit's radar.

The site was named Chandler Air Force Station (AFS) on 1 December 1953. By 1959 these sets had been replaced by AN/FPS-20 and AN/FPS-6 radars, and the AN/FPS-20 set was upgraded and redesignated as an AN/FPS-64, and a second height-finder radar (AN/FPS-26) was added in 1961.

During 1961 Chandler AFS joined the Semi Automatic Ground Environment (SAGE) system, initially feeding data to DC-11 at Grand Forks AFB, North Dakota. After joining, the squadron was redesignated as the 787th Radar Squadron (SAGE) on 1 April 1961. The radar squadron provided information 24/7 the SAGE Direction Center where it was analyzed to determine range, direction altitude speed and whether or not aircraft were friendly or hostile.

Chandler AFS was later switched to SAGE Data Center DC-22 at Sioux City AFS, Iowa in 1963. On 31 July 1963, the site was redesignated as NORAD ID Z-18. In 1965 Chandler AFS was operating an AN/FPS-27 set, and the AN/FPS-64 was inactivated.

The Air Force ceased radar operations on 2 July 1969, and inactivated the 787th Radar Squadron on 30 September 1969. Air Force teams dismantled and removed the radars and communications equipment throughout the summer of 1969. Domes from the two height-finder radars were removed, leaving one dome over the search radar. A small unit remained for over a year to run that radar for the Federal Aviation Administration.

The government subsequently sold the radar site to a developer and the housing area to a group of investors. Buyers removed the homes and the developer salvaged materials from the radar site, but was unable to find a commercial tenant or buyer. Today what was Chandler AFS has been obliterated, demolished in June 1993 after sitting derelict for decades. A radio transmitter station now stands on the site, and what appears to be a large overgrown pile of concrete on the site which may be the remains of the Air Force structures. The site is located at 339 State Highway 91, Chandler MN 56122 under the county-wide 9-1-1 address system.

== Air Force units and assignments ==
=== Units ===
- Constituted as the 787th Aircraft Control and Warning Squadron

Activated at Moulton, MN on 27 June 1951
Site named Chandler Air Force Station, 1 December 1953
Redesignated as 787th Radar Squadron (SAGE) on 1 April 1961
Inactivated on 30 September 1969

=== Assignments ===
- 543d Aircraft Control and Warning Group, 27 June 1951
- 31st Air Division, 6 February 1952
- 20th Air Division, 1 January 1959
- Kansas City Air Defense Sector, 1 January 1960
- Grand Forks Air Defense Sector, 1 March 1961
- Sioux City Air Defense Sector, 4 September 1963
- 30th Air Division, 1 April 1966
- 29th Air Division, 1 July 1968 – 30 September 1969

== See also ==
- List of United States Air Force aircraft control and warning squadrons
- United States general surveillance radar stations
