= Kansas City Air Defense Sector =

Kansas City Air Defense Sector
- Active: 1961–1962
- Country: United States
- Branch: United States Air Force
- Role: Air Defense
- Part of: Air Defense Command

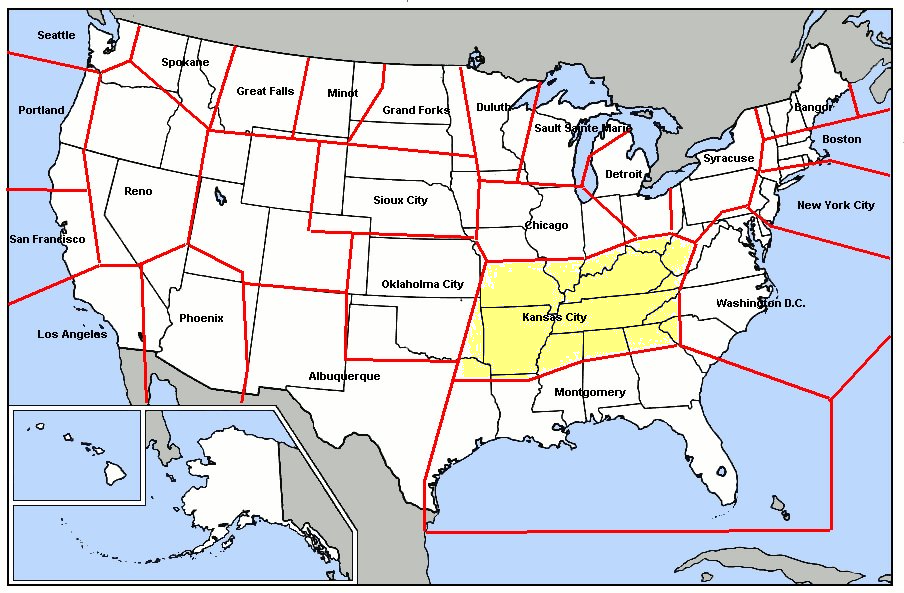
Map of Great Falls ADS

The Kansas City Air Defense Sector (KCADS) is an inactive United States Air Force organization. Its last assignment was with the Air Defense Command 29th Air Division, being stationed at Richards-Gebaur Air Force Base, Missouri. It was inactivated on 1 January 1962.

== History ==
Established in January 1960 assuming control of former ADC Central Air Defense Force units with a mission to provide air defense of Kentucky, Tennessee and Arkansas along with sections of southern Missouri; Illinois; Indiana and Ohio; western West Virginia; Virginia; North and South Carolina; northern Georgia, Alabama, Mississippi, and small sections of northeast Texas and eastern Oklahoma.

Operated a Manual Direction Center. The day-to-day operations of the command was to train and maintain tactical flying units flying jet interceptor aircraft (F-94 Starfire; F-102 Delta Dagger; F-106 Delta Dart) in a state of readiness with training missions and series of exercises with SAC and other units simulating interceptions of incoming enemy aircraft.

The sector was eliminated on 1 January 1962 as part of ADC reorganization and consolidation, the command's units being reassigned to several (20th, 34th, 32d) Air Divisions.

=== Lineage ===
- Established as Kansas City Air Defense Sector on 1 January 1960

Inactivated on 1 January 1962

=== Assignments ===
- 33d Air Division, 1 January 1960
- 29th Air Division, 1 July 1961 – 1 January 1962

=== Stations ===
- Richards-Gebaur AFB, Missouri, 1 January 1960 – 1 January 1962

=== Components ===
==== Wing ====
- 328th Fighter Wing (Air Defense)

Richards-Gebaur AFB, Missouri, 1 February-1 July 1961

==== Groups ====
- 53d Fighter Group (Air Defense)

Sioux City Airport, Iowa, 1 January-1 April 1960

- 328th Fighter Group (Air Defense)

Richards-Gebaur AFB, Missouri, 1 January 1960 – 1 July 1961

==== Radar squadrons ====
- 725th Radar Squadron

Walnut Ridge AFS, Arkansas, 1 January 1960 – 1 July 1961

- 738th Radar Squadron

Olathe AFS, Kansas, 1 January 1960 – 1 July 1961

- 787th Radar Squadron

Chandler AFS, Minnesota, 1 January 1960 – 1 July 1961

- 789th Radar Squadron

Omaha AFS, Nebraska, 1 January 1960 – 1 July 1961

- 796th Aircraft Control and Warning Squadron

Bartlesville AFS, Oklahoma, 1 January 1960 – 1 June 1961

- 797th Aircraft Control and Warning Squadron

Fordland AFS, Missouri, 1 January 1960 – 1 June 1961

- 798th Radar Squadron

Belleville AFS, Illinois, 1 January 1960 – 1 July 1961

== See also ==
- List of USAF Aerospace Defense Command General Surveillance Radar Stations
- Aerospace Defense Command Fighter Squadrons

External image
- SAGE facilities
