= Fordland Air Force Station =

Closed United States Air Force General Surveillance Radar station

Fordland Air Force Station
- Part of Air Defense Command (ADC)

Site information
- Type: Air Force Station
- Controlled by: United States Air Force

Location
- Location of Fordland AFS, Missouri
- Coordinates: 37°09′15″N 92°52′33″W

Site history
- Built: 1951
- In use: 1951–1961

Garrison information
- Garrison: 797th Aircraft Control and Warning Squadron

Fordland Air Force Station (ADC ID: P-68) is a closed United States Air Force General Surveillance Radar station. It is located 3.6 miles (5.8 km) east of Fordland, Missouri. It was closed in 1960.

== History ==
Fordland AFS was one of the twenty-eight stations built as part of the second segment of the Air Defense Command permanent radar network, primarily to provide air defense radar coverage for southern Missouri. Prompted by the start of the Korean War, on 11 July 1950, the Secretary of the Air Force asked the Secretary of Defense for approval to expedite construction of the permanent network. Receiving the Defense Secretary's approval on 21 July, the Air Force directed the Corps of Engineers to proceed with construction.

On 1 May 1951 the 797th Aircraft Control and Warning Squadron began operating AN/FPS-3 and AN/FPS-4 radars from Fordland, and initially the station functioned as a Ground-Control Intercept (GCI) and warning station. As a GCI station, the squadron's role was to guide interceptor aircraft toward unidentified intruders picked up on the unit's radar scopes. During 1954 an AN/TPS-10D saw service here; it was removed in 1955. In 1958 an AN/FPS-6 replaced the AN/FPS-4 height-finder radar which was removed in 1959.

In 1960 Fordland began feeding data to the Manual Control Center (MCC-2) at Richards-Gebaur AFB, Missouri as the SAGE Data Center (DC-8) was not yet operational. However, Fordland Air Force Station was inactivated 1 June 1961 due to budget constraints.

The site was reported excess to GSA in 1961, when it was conveyed via quitclaim deed in 1962 by HEW to the State of Missouri, Division of Inmate Education. Today the site is the Ozark Correctional Center (OCC), a minimum security (C-2) institution. It is also shown on maps as Fordlands Honor Camp. Many Air Force buildings remain and are in use, and from aerial images, appears to have the radar towers still standing.

== Air Force units and assignments ==
=== Units ===
- Constituted as the 797th Aircraft Control and Warning Squadron

Activated on 1 May 1951 at Fordland AFS, MO
Discontinued and inactivated on 1 June 1961

=== Assignments ===
- 546th Aircraft Control and Warning Group, 1 May 1951

159th Aircraft Control and Warning Group, 1 June 1951
33d Air Division, 6 February 1952

- 20th Air Division, 1 March 1956
- Kansas City Air Defense Sector, 1 January 1960 – 1 June 1961

== Fordland Honor Camp ==
The Fordland Air Force Station was acquired by the Missouri Department of Corrections and in 1961, the Fordland Honor Camp was opened. It was a satellite prison of the Missouri State Penitentiary to help ease the existing overcrowded conditions.

The first Commander of the newly opened Fordland Honor Camp was Sergeant Donald W. Wyrick, an employee of the Missouri State Penitentiary. He was specifically appointed to this position by Missouri State Penitentiary Warden E. V. Nash. Sergeant Wyrick would continue to work his way up through the ranks to become Warden of the Missouri State Penitentiary.

Today, the site is known as the Ozark Correctional Center. It is a minimum-security prison operated by Missouri's Department of Corrections. It houses 750 male inmates, all of whom are participating in a long-term drug rehabilitation program.

== See also ==
- List of United States Air Force aircraft control and warning squadrons
- United States general surveillance radar stations
