= Sundance Air Force Station =

Sundance Air Force Station
- Part of Air Defense Command (ADC)

Site information
- Type: Air Force Station
- Controlled by: United States Air Force

Location
- Location of Sundance AFS, Wyoming
- Coordinates: 44°28′43″N 104°27′06″W

Site history
- Built: 1960
- In use: 1960-1968

Garrison information
- Garrison: 731st Radar Squadron

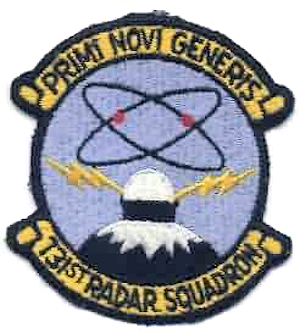
Emblem of the 731st Radar Squadron

Sundance Air Force Station (ADC ID: TM-201, NORAD ID: Z-201) is a closed United States Air Force General Surveillance Radar station. It is located 6.3 miles northwest of Sundance, Wyoming. It was closed in 1968.

== History ==
Sundance Air Force Station came into existence as part of Phase III of the Air Defense Command Mobile Radar program. On 20 October 1953 ADC requested a third phase of twenty-five radar sites be constructed.

The station became operational with the activation of the 731st Radar Squadron (SAGE) on 1 December 1960, feeding data to DC-19 at Minot AFB, North Dakota. Operational status was delayed at Sundance AFS to allow testing to determine if atomic energy could be used to produce sufficient power to operate a radar station.

A Portable Medium 1 (PM-1) transportable nuclear power plant developed by the US Army Nuclear Power Program was designed and installed on the site. The tests succeeded, and the site became operational in 1962 with the activation of AN/FPS-7C search radar and the AN/FPS-6 and AN/FPS-26 height-finder radars as the United States' first nuclear-powered radars.

The radar squadron provided information to the SAGE Direction Center where it was analyzed to determine range, direction, altitude, and speed, and to evaluate whether aircraft were friendly or hostile.

The radars were operated until 1968 when Air Defense Command closed the station as part of a draw down of assets and budget reductions. The PM-1 plant was operated by Air Force, Army and Navy personnel, and it produced electricity for 4,101 hours without incident. It was dismantled after the site was inactivated. The reactor site remains fenced, marked as "US Government Property, No Trespassing".

Today, what was Sundance AFS is part of a housing development called "Vista West". What remains of undeveloped parts of the radar station are abandoned, the buildings severely deteriorated.

== Air Force units and assignments ==
Units:

- 731st Radar Squadron (SAGE), Activated on 1 December 1960

Discontinued on 18 June 1968

Assignments:

- 29th Air Division, 1 December 1960
- Minot Air Defense Sector, 1 January 1961
- Sioux City Air Defense Sector, 25 June 1963
- 30th Air Division, 1 April 1966 – 18 June 1968

== See also ==
- List of USAF Aerospace Defense Command General Surveillance Radar Stations
