= Prospect Hill, Waltham, Massachusetts =

Hill and park in near Boston, Massachusetts, U.S.

Prospect Hill Park
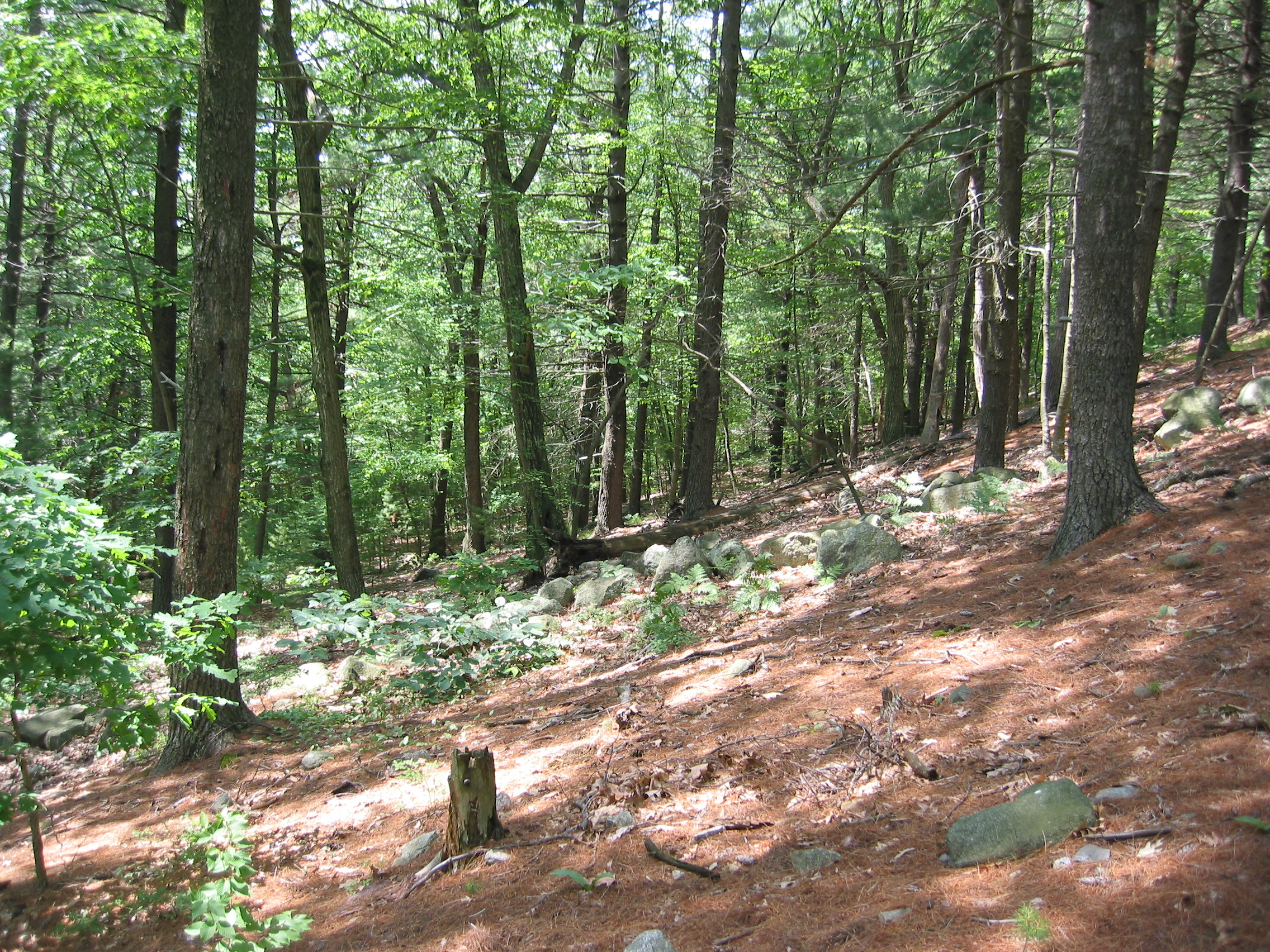
- Interactive map of Prospect Hill Park
- Location: Waltham, Massachusetts
- Coordinates: 42.3867°N 71.2544°W
- Area: 273 acres (110 ha)
- Elevation: 485 feet (148 m) (maximum)
- Created: 1893
- Operator: City of Waltham
- Website: www.city.waltham.ma.us/recreation-department/pages/prospect-hill-park

Prospect Hill is a hill in Waltham, Massachusetts, United States, and is the third-highest point within 12 miles (19 km) of downtown Boston. The hill is in Prospect Hill Park on the west side of Waltham, near Route 128. It is exceeded in height by Great Blue Hill and Chickatawbut Hill, both in the Blue Hills Reservation. It is not to be confused with the much lower, historically significant Prospect Hill near Union Square in Somerville.

There are two different summits; Big Prospect, at 485 feet (148 m), and Little Prospect at 435 feet (133 m). In clear weather, Monadnock, 54 miles away, is visible in an approximately northwest direction. The hill and the surrounding area make up the 273-acre (110 ha) Prospect Hill Park, a municipal park with numerous hiking trails and picnic areas that is the oldest and largest public open space in Waltham.

== History ==
Waltham acquired approximately 75 acres (30 ha) for the park from private landowners in 1893. This area comprised the two peaks and their immediate surroundings. Additional land was purchased over several decades and the park reached 219 acres (89 ha) in 1927. It was improved with trails, picnic areas, fences and other amenities and generally well maintained through the first half of the 20th century. Vegetation management included the clearing of dead trees and underbrush, as well as the planting of thousands of trees. As a result of additional land purchases, the parked reached 250 acres by 1997. Its current size is 273 acres.

In 2021, the main park entrance from Totten Pond Road was temporarily closed as construction began on a capital improvement project to add "a water spray park, children’s playground area, picnic area, pavilion, multipurpose half court and a gaga pit". Construction was completed and the park reopened in November 2021.

== Ski slope ==
Additional land was added in 1948 for a ski slope. Slope construction was performed mostly by volunteers and included lights for night skiing. Natural snow cover was poor and there was little utilization due to insufficient snow for many years until snow making equipment was installed in 1968. A T-Bar was also added at that time. The ski area was popular for area residents learning to ski and was also convenient for those wanting to ski at night. The ski slopes were open from 1949 to 1987. The area reopened briefly in 1989–90 and has been closed since. The slope was operated by the city of Waltham until 1985. Thereafter, the facility was leased to private operators.

Due to the topography of Big Prospect, a very unusual configuration existed, with the novice area above a much steeper expert slope.

== Nearby development ==
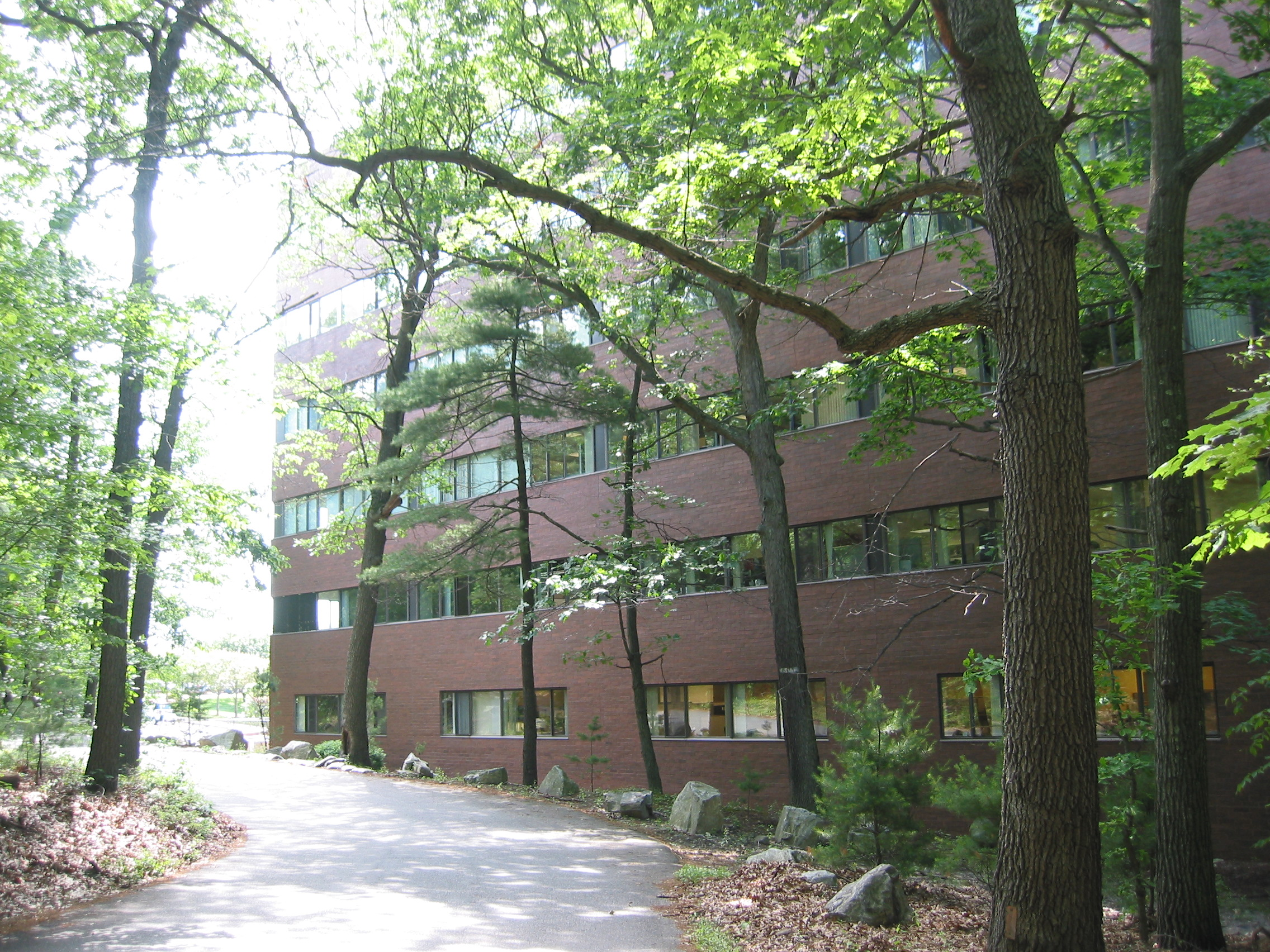
Office building on 5th Avenue is adjacent to the park road

The construction of Route 128 less than 1,000 feet (300 m) west of the park led to the construction of several office buildings next to the park's western boundary.

The former headquarters of the Polaroid Corporation was located adjacent to the southwest corner of Prospect Hill Park. The site was vacant for many years, until construction began in 2013 of "1265 Main," a mixed use retail and office project. The first phase of the project, including retail space and the U. S. headquarters of Clarks footwear, opened in 2016. Construction of Phase 2 began in 2019.

== Water tanks ==
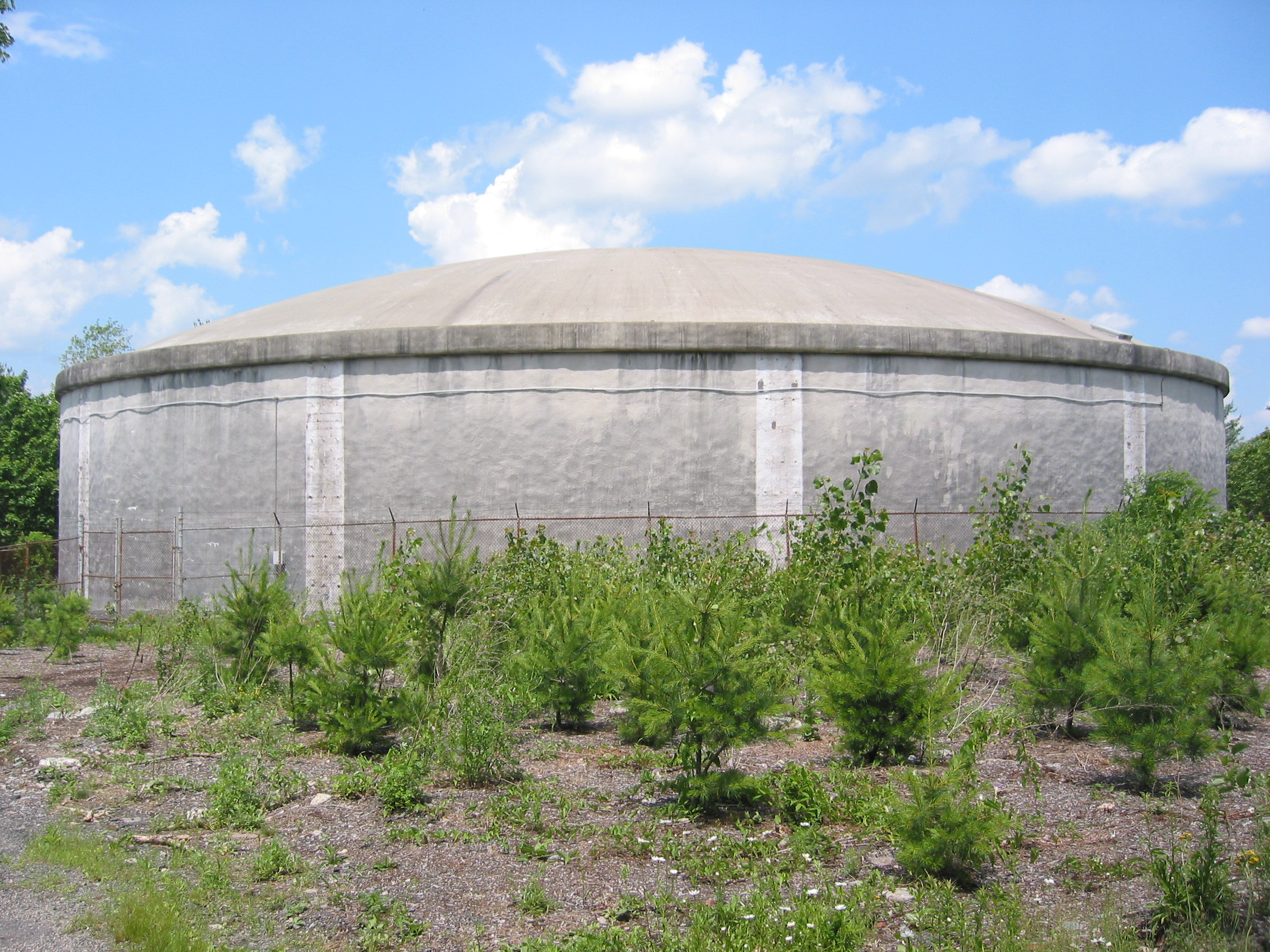
Water tank

In 1974, the city of Waltham built two water tanks near the summit of Big Prospect to hold eight million gallons of water. Their elevation guarantees good water pressure throughout the city.

== Other towers ==
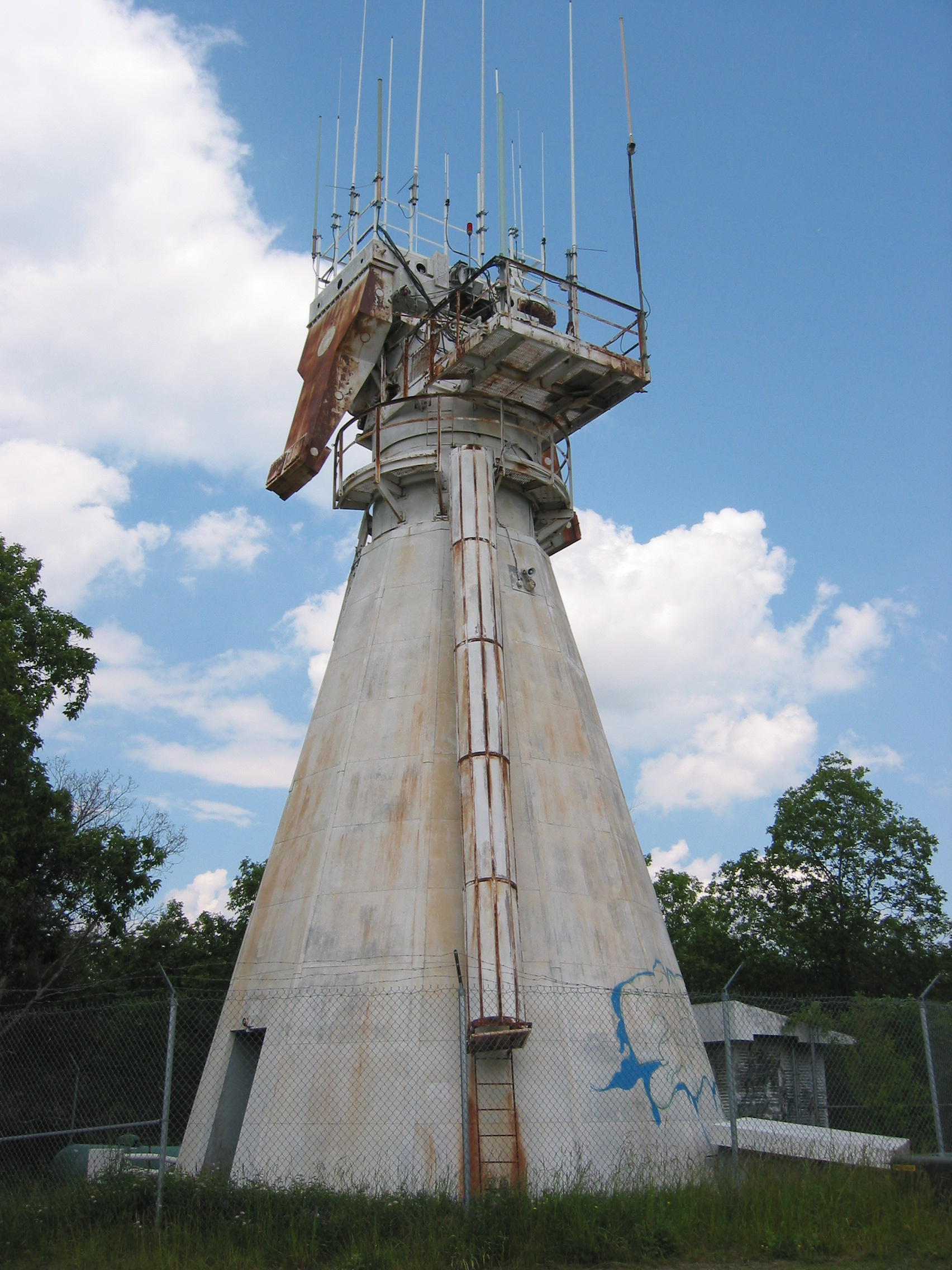
Communications tower

In 1917, a fire tower (used for the visual location of forest fires) was constructed on Big Prospect. Beginning in 1951, the United States Air Force utilized Big Prospect for research purposes. They erected a large parabolic dish antenna in 1963. This necessitated relocation of the fire tower to Little Prospect. This tower also became the location for the city's fire radio transmitters, and later for equipment of the Waltham Amateur Radio Association.

Projects included Experimental SAGE Subsector in the 1950s and the Joint Tactical Information Distribution System in the 1970s.

In 1997, the Air Force left Prospect Hill Park, and in 2002 all radio equipment was relocated to Big Prospect, serving Waltham's fire, police, public works, parks and recreation departments, the Massachusetts Army National Guard, the Civil Air Patrol, and the Waltham Amateur Radio Association.

== Gallery ==
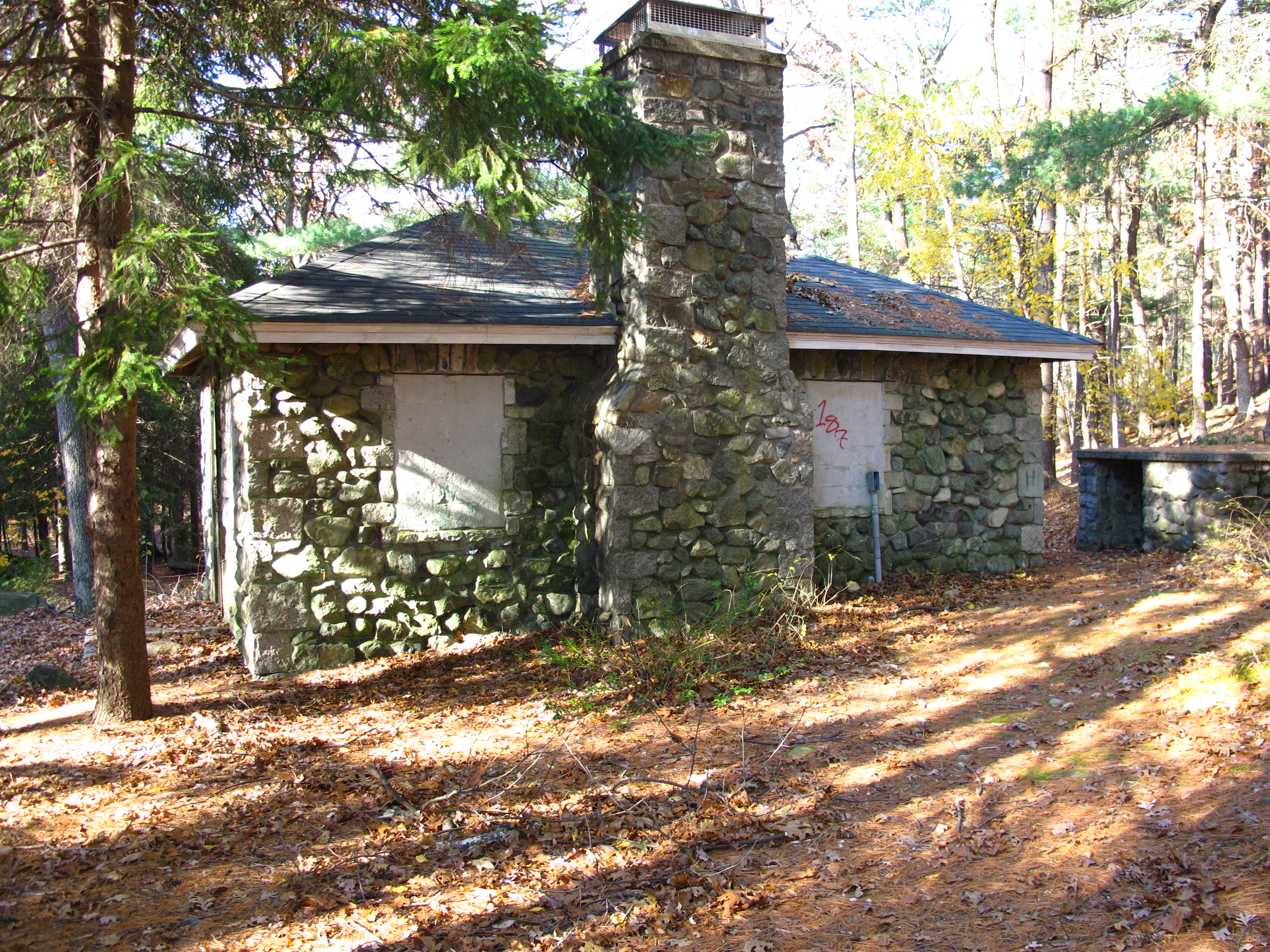
A park building in 2011

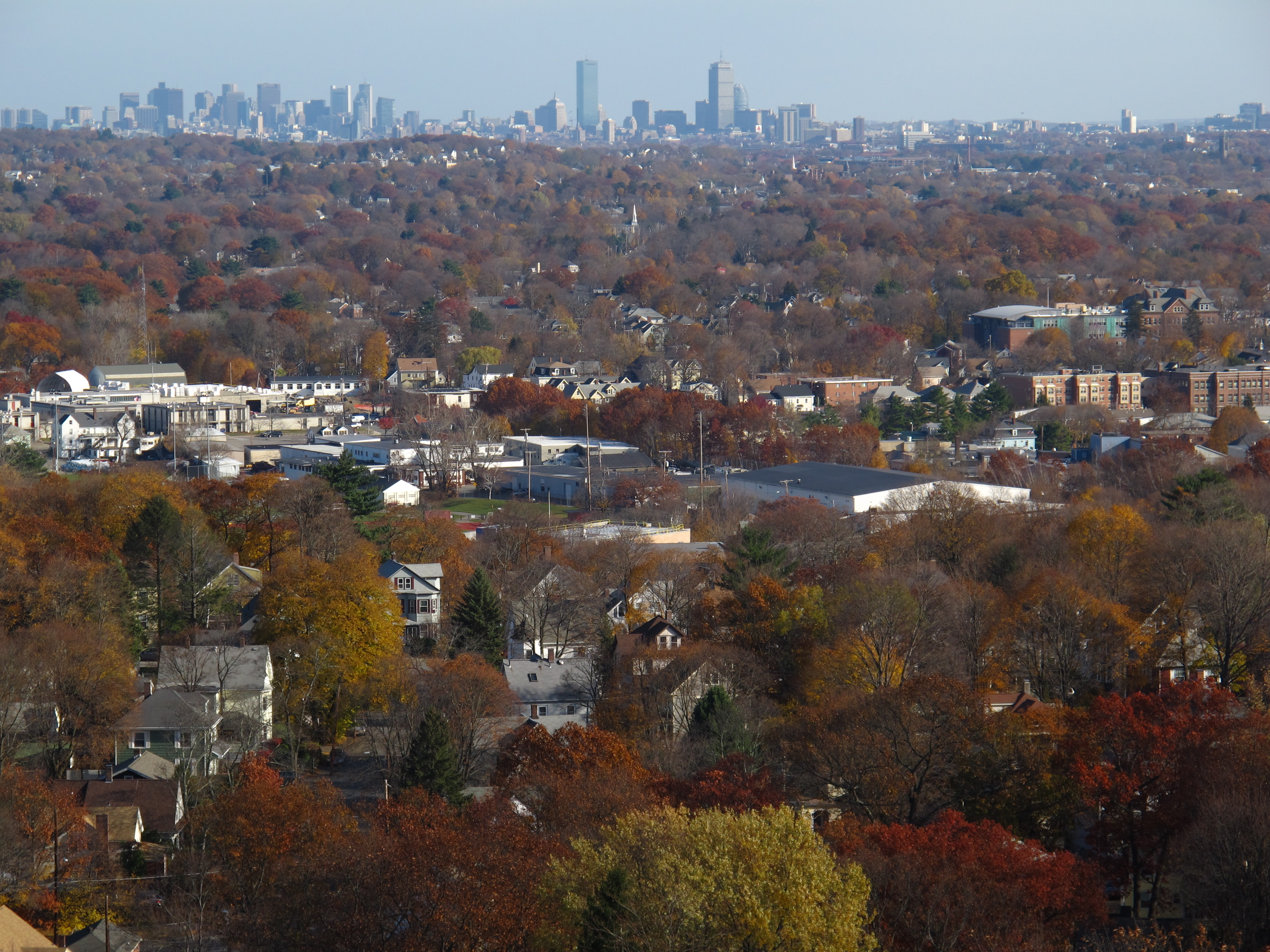
Boston seen from the park

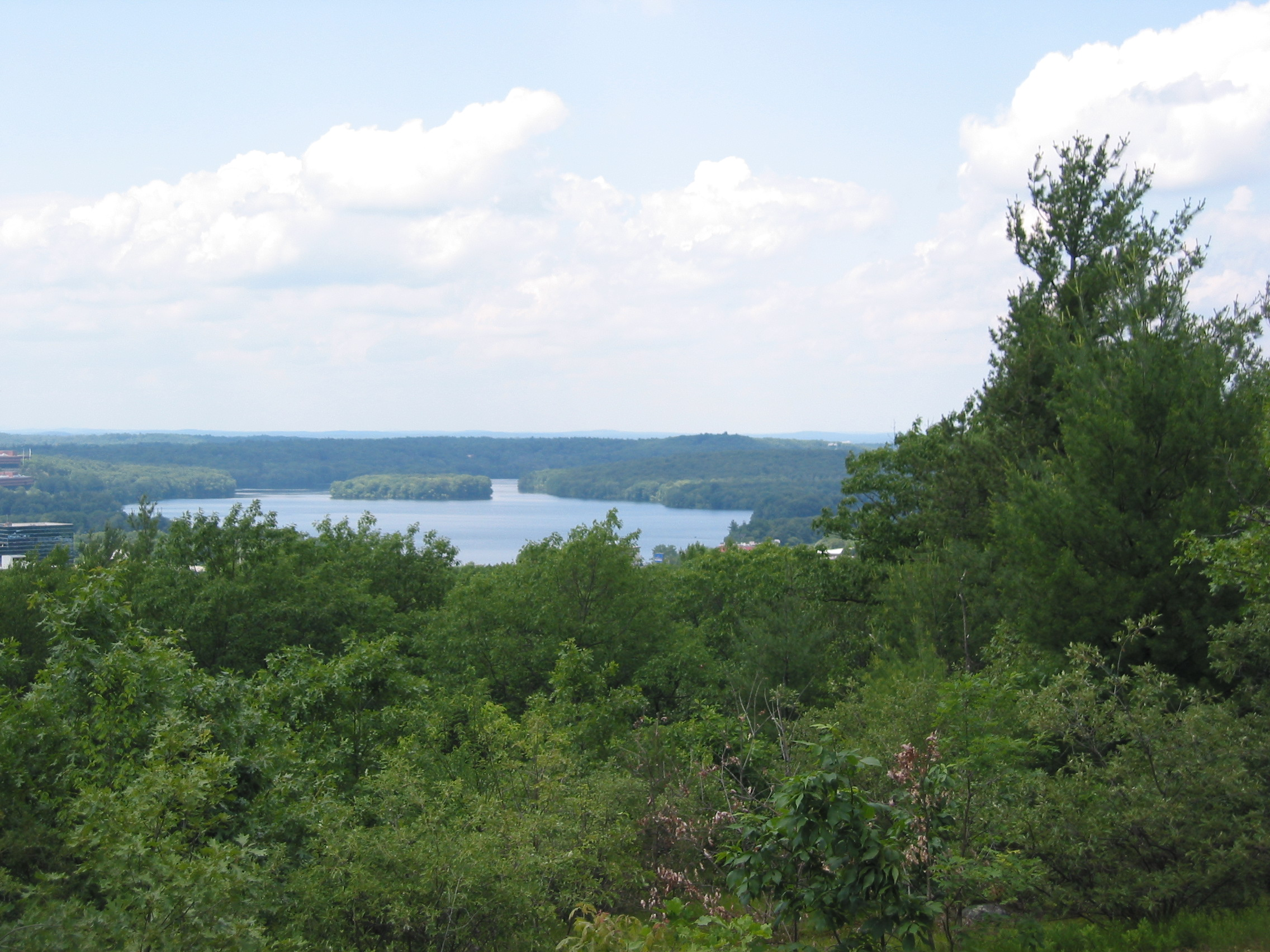
View to northwest includes Cambridge Reservoir

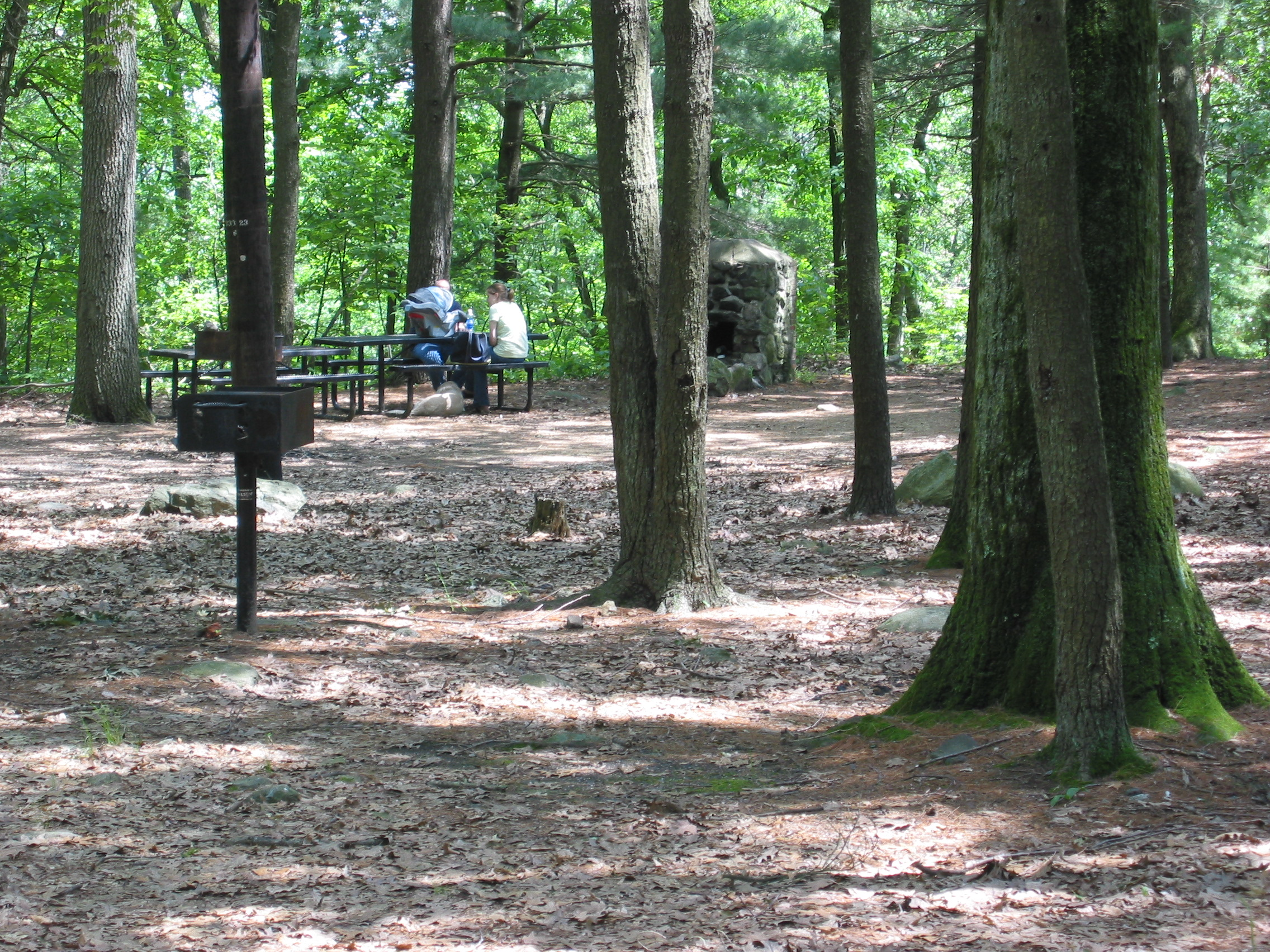
Picnic area

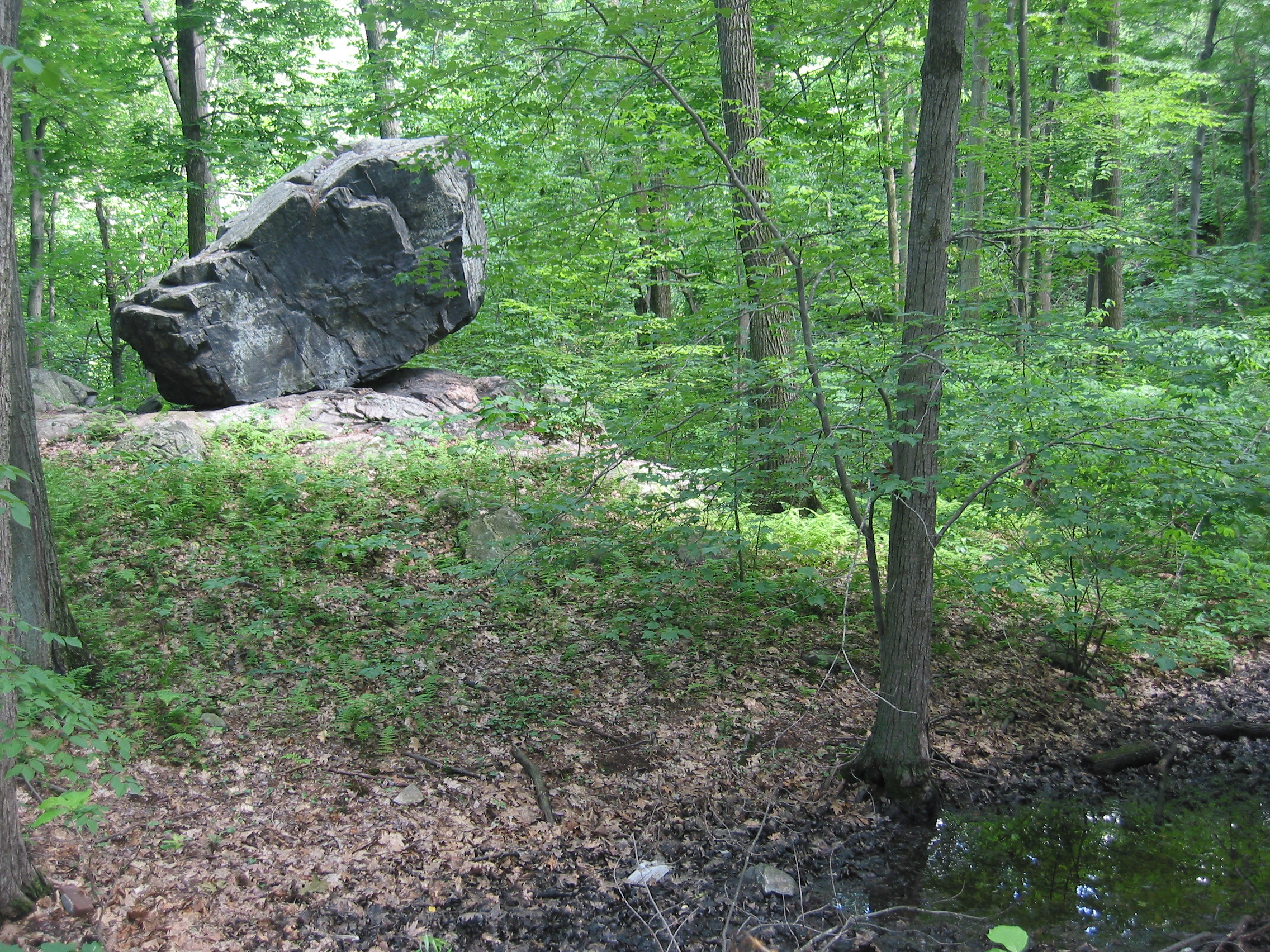
Glacial boulder
