= Dallas Center Air Force Station =

United States Air Force General Surveillance Radar station

Dallas Center Air Force Station
- Part of Air Defense Command (ADC)

Site information
- Type: Air Force Station
- Controlled by: United States Air Force

Location
- Location of Dallas Center AFS, Iowa
- Coordinates: 41°43′02″N 093°54′19″W

Site history
- Built: 1955
- In use: 1955-1957

Garrison information
- Garrison: 650th Aircraft Control and Warning Squadron

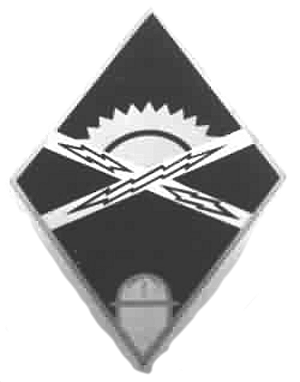
Emblem of the 650th Aircraft Control and Warning Squadron

Dallas Center Air Force Station (ADC ID: M-122) is a United States Air Force General Surveillance Radar station 3.7 miles (6.0 km) northeast of Dallas Center, Iowa, that was closed in 1957.

== History ==
Dallas Center Air Force Station was established as part of the planned deployment by Air Defense Command of forty-four Mobile radar stations across the United States to support the permanent Radar network established during the Cold War for air defense of the United States. This deployment had been projected to be operational by mid-1952.

The site consisted of 38.92 acres fee by purchase and condemnation and no-area license by donation made between March 1954 and November 1956: funding, constant site changes, construction, and equipment delivery delayed deployment. Improvements at the site consisted of a radar station; traffic check house, power building, mess hall, administration building; two supply buildings; 65-man airmen's barracks; base auto shop; water storage and pump house; above and underground storage tanks; sanitary sewer system; streets, drives, sidewalks, and parking areas.

Operational status was achieved in 1956 after the 650th Aircraft Control and Warning Squadron was moved to Dallas Center on 1 July 1955 with an AN/TPS-1D radar that had been moved in from Fort Snelling, Minnesota. Initially, the station was a Ground-Control Intercept (GCI) and warning station. As a GCI station, the squadron's role was to guide interceptor aircraft toward unidentified intruders picked up on the unit's radar scopes. The construction of the buildings was almost all wood or sheetrock.

Budget cuts forced Dallas Center AFS to cease operations in mid-1957, and the tending 650th AC&W Squadron was inactivated shortly after that. The site was then converted to an unstaffed AN/FPS-18 gap-filler radar annex (P-71C) for Omaha AFS, Nebraska. It was finally inactivated in December 1957. GSA reported an excess 38.23 acres fee on October 30, 1959, and then quitclaimed it to a private party on March 7, 1961, reserving road and utility line easement to the 3.15 acres. Relatives of the private party still own the 38.92 acres, which include the site and access on which the staffed radar station was located.

Both buildings and the radar tower are still extant. The site is now being used for Greenhouses for truck crops and as an auto junkyard. In 1988, the owners stated that only two structures remain and that all the above-ground storage tanks have been removed.

== Air Force units and assignments ==
Units:

- 650th Aircraft Control and Warning Squadron

Activated 20 November 1948 at Orlando AFB, Florida
Inactivated c. 27 September 1949
Activated at Snelling AFS, MN, 20 May 1953
Moved to Dallas Center AFS, IA on 1 July 1955
Inactivated on 8 October 1957

Assignments:

- 539th Aircraft Control & Warning Group, 20 November 1948 - ca. 27 September 1949
- 31st Air Division, 1 July 1955
- 20th Air Division, 1 March 1956 – 8 October 1957

== See also ==
- List of USAF Aerospace Defense Command General Surveillance Radar Stations
