= 738th Radar Squadron =

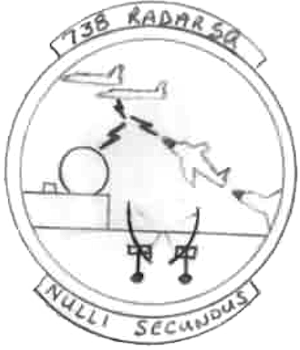
- Emblem of the 738th Radar Squadron
- Active: 1953-1968
- Country: United States
- Branch: United States Air Force
- Type: General Radar Surveillance

The 738th Radar Squadron is an inactive United States Air Force unit. It was last assigned to the 30th Air Division, Aerospace Defense Command, stationed at Olathe Air Force Station, Kansas. It was inactivated on 8 September 1968.

The unit was a General Surveillance Radar squadron providing for the air defense of the United States. The Federal Aviation Administration was co-located inside the Boundary of the 738th. The FAA maintained and operated the search radar system (AN/FPS-27) to control air traffic for western Missouri, and eastern Kansas. The 738th maintained two AN/FPS-6 radar systems.

Lineage

- Activated as 738th Aircraft Control and Warning Squadron on 1 February 1953

Redesignated as 738th Radar Squadron (SAGE), 1 January 1962
Inactivated on 8 September 1988

Assignments

- 33d Air Division, 1 February 1953
- 20th Air Division, 1 March 1956
- Kansas City Air Defense Sector, 1 January 1960
- Sioux City Air Defense Sector, 1 July 1961
- 30th Air Division, 1 April 1966 – 8 September 1988

Stations

- Olathe AFS, Kansas, 1 February 1953 – 8 September 1988
