= AN/GPA-35 Ground Environment =

The Westinghouse AN/GPA-35 Ground Environment (GPA-35 colloq.) was a United States Air Force surface-to-air missile weapons direction system. It was used for launch and steering during CIM-10 Bomarc tests during the Cold War. The command guidance system manufactured by Westinghouse Electric Corporation used Bendix AN/FPS-20 Radar data to track the missile. Lincoln Laboratory Division 6 had an AN/GPA-35 Study Group for integrating the AN/GPA-35 into the SAGE System.

Notable launches with GPA-35 guidance included:

- October 1956 — Six launches were used to test the AN/GPA-35 capability to command BOMARC intercept of QB-17 drones.
- October 1957 — A BOMARC test with "live high-explosive warhead" failed when the GPA-35 commanded "faulty mid-course guidance".
- 1 May 1958 — The "GPA-35 could not control the missile beyond 130 miles."
- 7 August 1958 — A GPA-35 took control of an airborne BOMARC from the Experimental SAGE Sector, and the missile malfunctioned and crashed into the Atlantic Ocean.
- 6 March 1959 — A straying BOMARC was self-destructed near the western boundary of the Eglin Gulf Test Range after a GPA-35 had transmitted the wrong commands.
- 13 April 1959 — The GPA-35 lost control of the missile 100 seconds after launch.
- 24 April 1959 — GPA-35 control was used for simultaneous guidance of two BOMARCS.

In accordance with the Joint Electronics Type Designation System (JETDS), the "AN/GPA-35" designation represents the 35th design of an Army-Navy electronic device for ground radar auxiliary system. The JETDS system also now is used to name all Department of Defense electronic systems.

== See also ==
- List of radars
- List of military electronics of the United States

== Bibliography ==
- McMullen, R. F. (15 February 1980). History of Air Defense Weapons 1946–1962 (Report). Vol. ADC Historical Study No. 14. Historical Division, Office of information, HQ ADC.
- Rice, Helen (2017). History of Ogden Air Material Area... 1934 - 1960 (Scribd image) (Report). p. 204. "On 17 May 1957 the Boeing Airplane Co., the prime contractor, received its initial contract for a plus [sic] $135 million to produce IM-99 Bomarcs. ...Boeing subcontracted to...Westinghouse Electric for the AN/GPA-35, ground-to-air guidance system used on the Bomarc until SAGE was fully operational"
