= Olathe Air Force Station =

Former United States Air Force radar station

Olathe Air Force Station
- Part of Air Defense Command (ADC)

Site information
- Type: Air Force Station
- Code: ADC ID: P-72, NORAD ID: Z-72
- Controlled by: United States Air Force

Location
- Location of Olathe AFS, Kansas
- Coordinates: 38°50′06″N 094°54′16″W

Site history
- Built: 1951
- In use: 1951–1968

Garrison information
- Garrison: 738th Aircraft Control and Warning (later Radar) Squadron

Olathe Air Force Station is a former United States Air Force radar station that was located in Gardner, Kansas. It was located next to Naval Air Station Olathe, now the grounds of New Century AirCenter.

== History ==
In 1950 the United States Air Force Air Defense Command selected Olathe NAS as a site for one of twenty-eight radar stations built as part of the second segment of the permanent ADC general radar surveillance network for the United States. Prompted by the start of the Korean War, on 11 July 1950, the Secretary of the Air Force asked the Secretary of Defense for approval to expedite construction of the second segment of the permanent network. Olathe was to provide defense radar coverage of the Kansas City area.

Receiving the Defense Secretary's approval on 21 July, the Air Force directed the Army Corps of Engineers to proceed with construction of a radar station on the western part of the ground station, about a mile from the runway and ramp/hangars being used by the Navy. Additional housing units were also constructed at Olathe to accommodate the Air Force personnel. The Federalized Utah Air National Guard 130th Aircraft Control and Warning Squadron was assigned to the site on 1 June 1951 at the facilities of the 2472d Air Force Reserve Training Command, and initially the station functioned as a Ground control intercept (GCI) and warning station. As a GCI station, the squadron's role was to guide interceptor aircraft toward unidentified intruders picked up on the unit's radar scopes. It was relieved from active duty and returned to control of the State of Utah on 1 February 1953.

The Ground Air Transmitting Receiving (GATR) Site for communications was located at 38°50′27″N 094°54′19″W, approximately 0.4 miles north from the main site. Normally the GATR site was connected by a pair of buried telephone cables, with a backup connection of dual telephone cables overhead. The Coordinate Data Transmitting Set (CDTS) (AN/FST-2) at the main site converted each radar return into a digital word which was transmitted by the GATR via microwave to the Control Center.

The national guardsmen were replaced by the 738th Aircraft Control and Warning Squadron (AC&W) was activated at was designated by ADC as Olathe Air Force Station, being designated P-72. The squadron began operations in using AN/CPS-4 and AN/FPS-3 radars. The AN/CPS-4 soon was replaced by an AN/FPS-4 set that in turn was superseded by a pair of AN/FPS-6A sets in 1958. In 1958 this site also replaced the AN/FPS-3 set with an AN/FPS-20 search radar.

Olathe AFS used these radars in conjunction with the Nike missile Army Air-Defense Command Post (AADCP) KC-65DC (1959–1969).

In 1958, the United States Army established an Air-Defense Command Post (AADCP) KC-65DC with the Air Force radar station at Olathe for Nike missile command-and-control functions as part of the Kansas City Defense Area. The site was equipped with the AN/GSG-5(V) BIRDIE solid-state computer system. The Army radars were fully integrated with the Air Force network, and both Army and Air Force personnel operated the radars.

In addition to the main facility, Olathe AFS operated the AN/FPS-14 Gap Filler site:

- Garland, KS (P-72A) 37°45′40″N 094°38′51″W

In late 1959 this station was also performing air-traffic-control duties for the Federal Aviation Administration (FAA). In the early 1960s the search radar was upgraded and redesignated as an AN/FPS-66. During late January 1961 Olathe AFS joined the Semi Automatic Ground Environment (SAGE) system, feeding data to DC-22 at Sioux City AFS, Iowa. After joining, the squadron was re-designated as the 793d Radar Squadron (SAGE) on 1 February 1962.

The radar squadron provided information 24/7 the SAGE Direction Center where it was analyzed to determine range, direction altitude speed and whether or not aircraft were friendly or hostile. On 31 July 1963, the site was redesignated as NORAD ID Z-72. Over the years, the equipment at the station was upgraded or modified to improve the efficiency and accuracy of the information gathered by the radars.

In September 1968 the Air Force inactivated the 738th Radar Squadron due to budget reductions and a general phase-down of Air Defense Command. The Army inactivated the Nike-Hercules AADCP in 1969

== See also ==
- United States general surveillance radar stations
