= AN/CPS-4 Radar =

AN/CPS-4
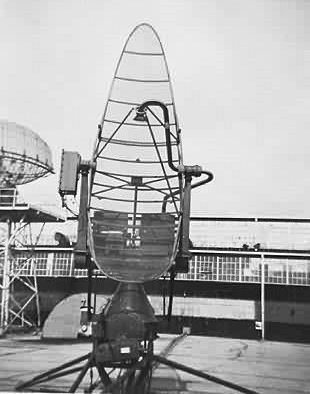
- AN/CPS-4 Radar
- Type: Medium-Range Height Finding
- Frequency: 2700 to 2900 MHz

The AN/CPS-4 Radar was a medium-range height-finding radar used by the United States Air Force Air Defense Command.

Developed by MIT's Radiation Laboratory, this height-finding radar was nicknamed "Beaver Tail." The radar was designed to be used in conjunction with the SCR-270 and SCR-271 search sets. The CPS-4 required six operators. This S-band radar, operating in the 2700 to 2900 MHz range, could detect targets at a distance of ninety miles. The vertical antenna was twenty feet high and five feet wide. This radar was often paired with the AN/FPS-3 search radar during the early 1950s at permanent network radar sites.

In accordance with the Joint Electronics Type Designation System (JETDS), the "AN/CPS-4" designation represents the 4th design of an Army-Navy air transportable electronic device for search radar equipment. The JETDS system also now is used to name all Department of Defense electronic systems.

== See also ==
- List of radars
- List of military electronics of the United States
