= 125th Special Tactics Squadron =

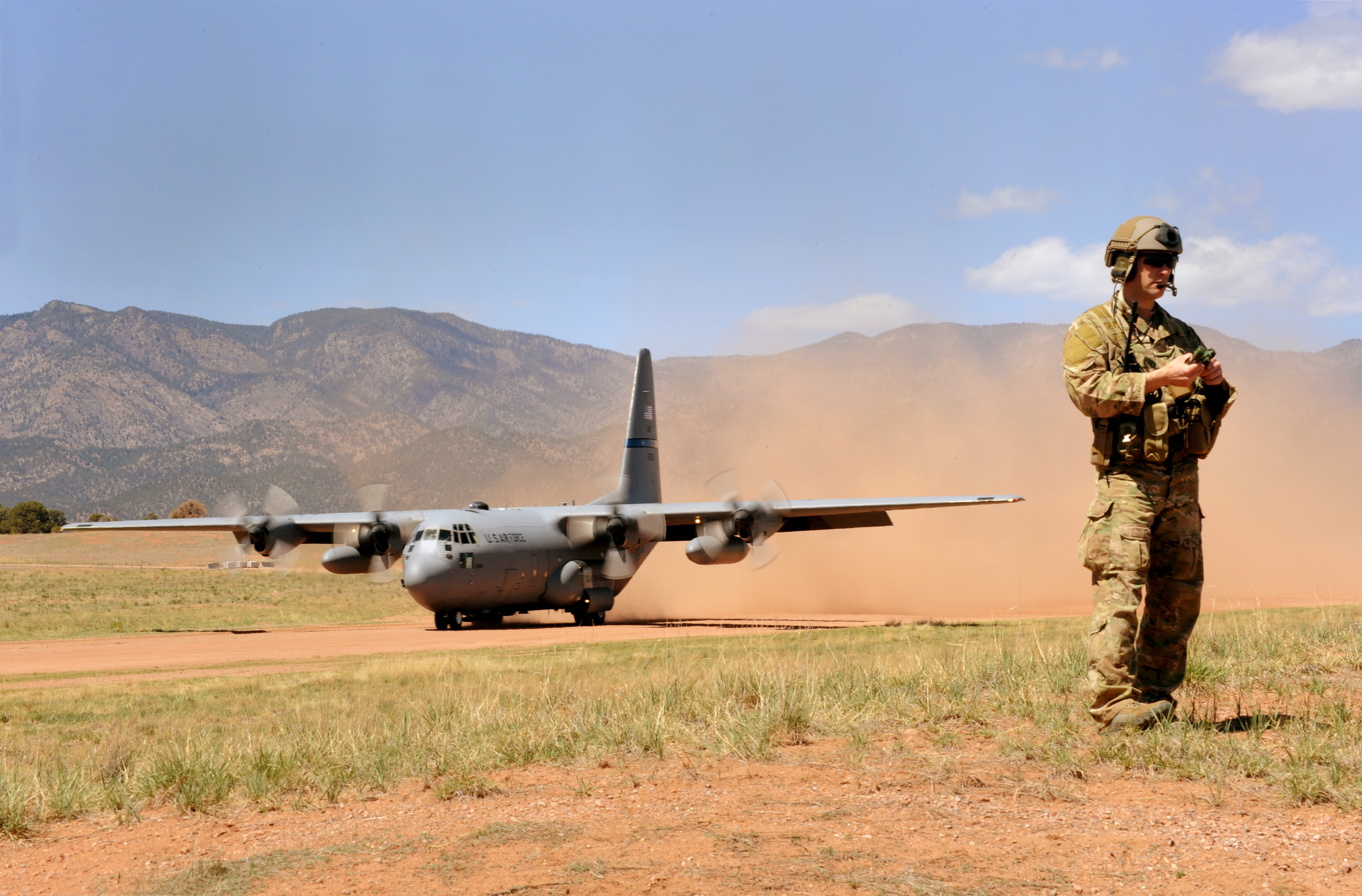
- A 125th Special Tactics Squadron special operations weatherman takes weather readings while a C-130 lands at the Red Devil air strip at Fort Carson, Colorado
- Active: 1956–present
- Country: United States
- Branch: Air National Guard
- Role: Special Operations, Direct Action, Unconventional warfare, Combat search and rescue, Combat Medic, Personnel recovery, Hostage Rescue, Human Intelligence, Humanitarian intervention Command and Control, Communications, Close Air Support, Air Support, Light Infantry, Airfield Assault Zone establishment, Air traffic control, fire support, Forward observer, Special reconnaissance
- Part of: Oregon Air National Guard
- Garrison/HQ: Portland Air National Guard Base
- Engagements: War in Afghanistan; Iraq War

Insignia
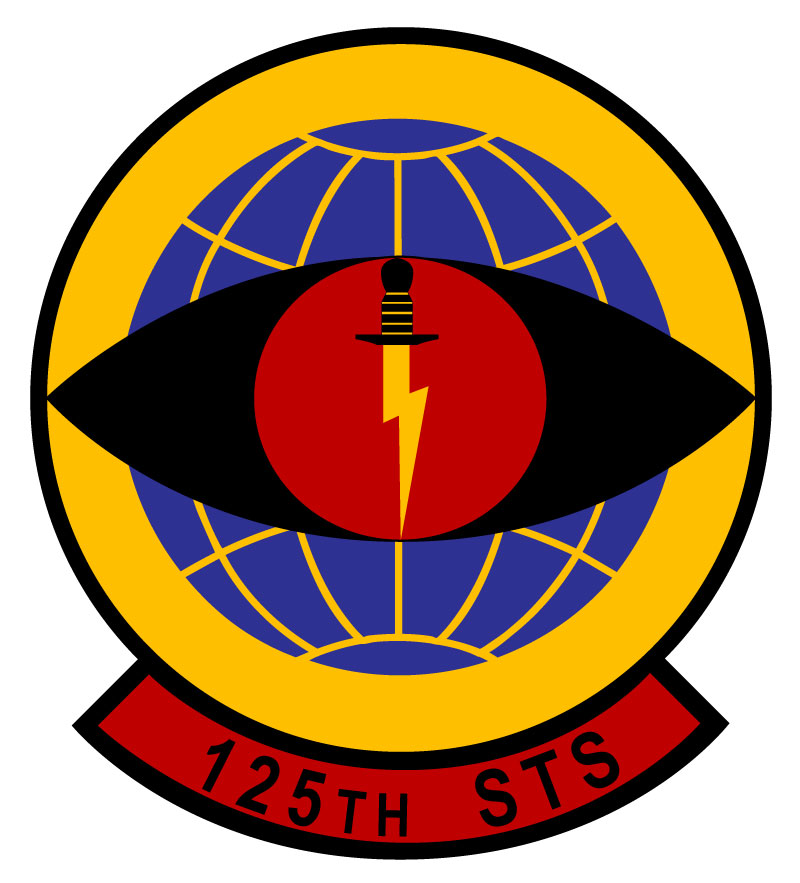
- 125th Special Tactics Squadron emblem

The 125th Special Tactics Squadron is a special operations force unit serving as part of the 142nd Wing of the United States Air National Guard. It is based at the Portland Air National Guard Base in Portland, Oregon.

== Mission ==
The squadron provides tactical air and ground integration force and the Air Force's special operations ground force leading global strike, personnel recovery operations and battlefield surgery.

The Special Tactics Squadron consist of:

- United States Air Force Combat Control Team - who are FAA-certified air traffic controllers and establish air control and provide combat support.
- United States Air Force Pararescue - primary mission is personnel recovery in hostile areas and are expert combat medical professionals.
- United States Air Force Special Reconnaissance – Special Reconnaissance Airmen are trained in surveillance and reconnaissance, electronic warfare (EW), long-range precision engagement and target interdiction, small unmanned aircraft systems.
- United States Air Force Combat Rescue Officer – is a Special Warfare Officer career field in the United States Air Force. Its Air Force Specialty Code (AFSC) is 19ZXC and it was created to strengthen USAF Special Warfare personnel recovery capabilities by providing commissioned officer leadership that possessed an operational skillset paralleling that of the enlisted pararescuemen (PJ). The CRO specialty includes direct combatant command and control of Combat Search and Rescue (CSAR) operations. They plan, manage and execute the six tasks of CSAR: prepare, report, locate, support, recover, and reintegrate isolated personnel and materiel. CROs conduct strategic, operational and tactical level planning, provide battle staff expertise, manage theater personnel recovery operations and conduct combat special operations.

Members of the 125th Special Tactics Squadron are trained in numerous infiltration methods that include: static-line and military free-fall parachuting, scuba, small boats, all-terrain vehicles, mountain ski and hiking, rappelling and fast rope.

== History ==
The 125th STS was is one of only two Special Tactics Units in the Air National Guard. On 9 September 2006, the 244th Combat Communications Squadron was re-missioned creating the fully operational 125th Special Tactics Squadron in 2007 at Portland Air National Guard Base, Portland, Oregon.

== See also ==
- List of United States Air Force special tactics squadrons
