= 123d Fighter Squadron =

123d Fighter Squadron

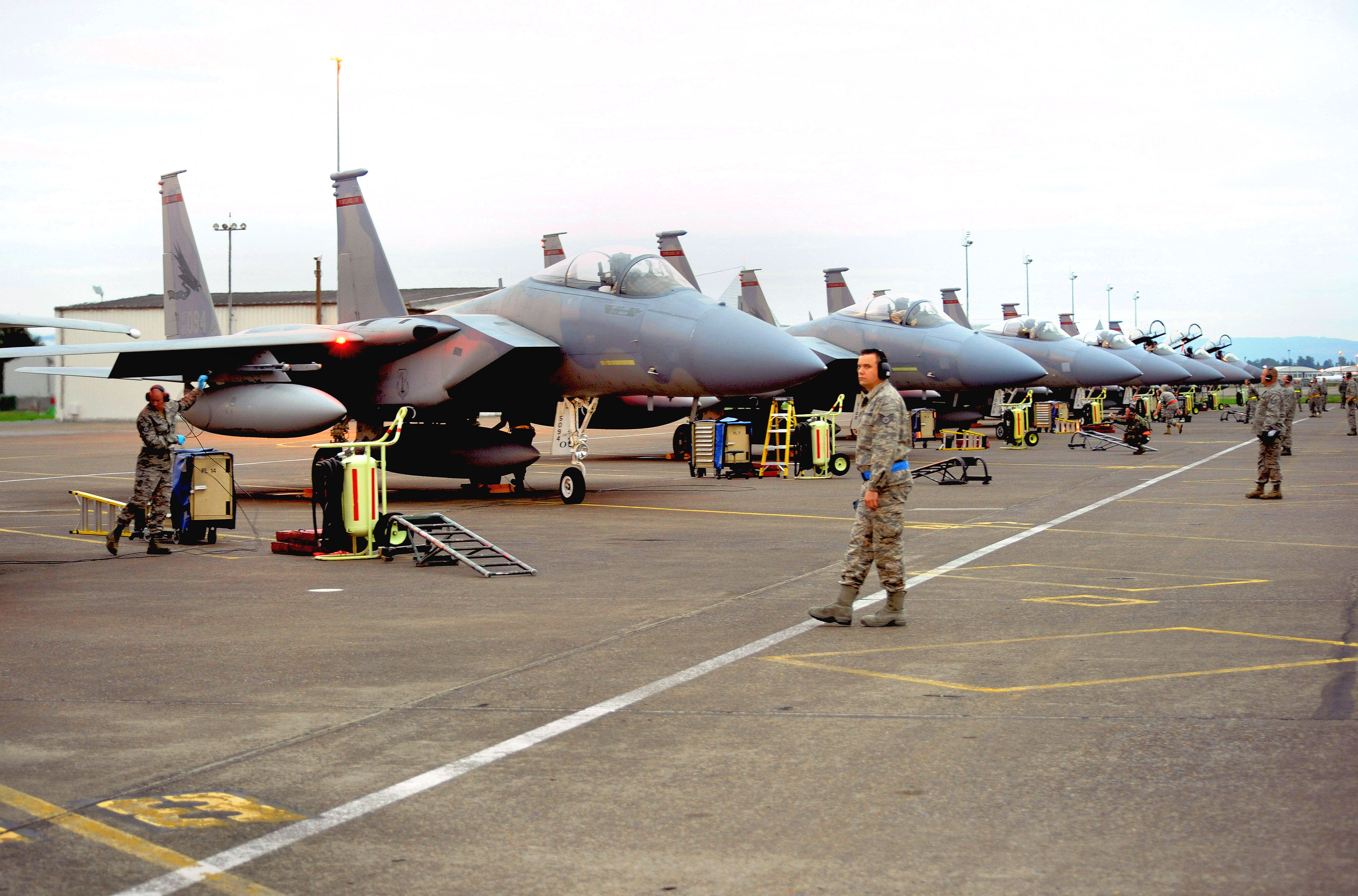
- Airmen of the 142nd Fighter Wing prepare F-15 Eagles for an overseas tour to supportExercise Iron Falcon (Note: Exercise Iron Falcon was held at the United Arab Emirates Air Warfare Center on 2 October 2010 and lasted 30 days.)
- Active: 1941–1945; 1946–1952; 1952–present
- Country: United States
- Allegiance: Oregon
- Branch: Air National Guard
- Type: Squadron
- Role: Fighter (air defense)
- Part of: Oregon Air National Guard
- Garrison/HQ: Portland Air National Guard Base, Oregon
- Nickname: Redhawks
- Engagements: American Theater, Antisubmarine Campaign; China-Burma-India Theater

Insignia
- 123d Fighter Squadron emblem (Note: Approved for the 35th Photographic Reconnaissance Squadron 23 October 1944. Reinstated for 123d Fighter Squadron.)

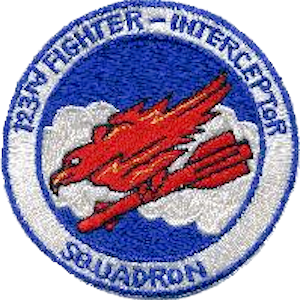
- Patch with 123d Fighter-Interceptor Squadron emblem

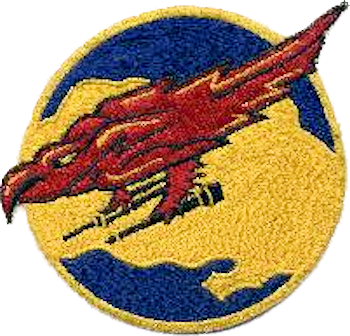
- Patch with 123d Fighter Squadron emblem (Note: Approved 24 January 1950)

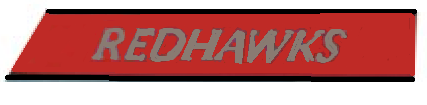
- Tail stripe

The 123d Fighter Squadron is a unit of the Oregon Air National Guard 142nd Fighter Wing located at Portland Air National Guard Base, Oregon. The 123d is equipped with the McDonnell Douglas F-15C Eagle and Boeing F-15EX Eagle II.

The squadron is a descendant organization of the 123d Observation Squadron formed on 30 July 1940. It was activated on 18 April 1941. The squadron is one of the 29 original National Guard Observation Squadrons of the United States Army National Guard formed before World War II.

== History ==
=== Oregon National Guard ===
Allotted to the Oregon National Guard in 1940, activated on 18 April 1941 at Portland Municipal Airport. The newly formed unit began operations with two officers, 108 enlisted men and two aircraft, a North American BC-1A (like the AT-6) and a Douglas O-46A. The squadron flew observation missions primarily along the Pacific Coast and occasionally made mail flights.

=== World War II ===
First ordered to active service in September 1941 as part of the pre-World War II buildup of the United States Army Air Corps, the 123d was assigned to the 70th Observation Group of Fourth Air Force. After the Japanese attack on Pearl Harbor, the squadron flew antisubmarine patrols along the Pacific Coast from airfields in Oregon and Washington, later becoming part of the air defense forces of Southern California. This included one of the first missions flown from a U.S. base on 7 December 1941. The squadron flew antisubmarine patrols until mid-1943 when the mission was turned over to the United States Navy.

After completion of the antisubmarine patrols, the 123d was reassigned to Third Air Force, and first send to Texas then to Oklahoma for training for combat reconnaissance and aerial photography to support Army ground forces. The squadron was deployed to Fourteenth Air Force in China as part of the China Burma India Theater, and engaged in unarmed observation flights over Japanese-held territory supporting Chinese Nationalist forces. During their deployment, the 123d flew North American B-25 Mitchells, Douglas A-20 Havocs and DB-7 Bostons originally built for the RAF. In late 1943, the 123d was redesignated the 35th Photographic Reconnaissance Squadron. The men and aircraft flew from rough and remote airfields in China throughout the rest of World War II, later flying unarmed high-speed long-range Lockheed P-38 Lightnings and F-5 reconnaissance Lightnings. The squadron received credit for participation in seven campaigns in World War II. Not all 123d personnel served with the 35th Photographic Reconnaissance Squadron, as some were diverted to other units as early as 1942 and served elsewhere in the Pacific and in Europe.

As part of the large drawdown of forces after the war, the 35th PRS inactivated on 7 November 1945, at Camp Kilmer, New Jersey.

=== Oregon Air National Guard ===
The squadron was redesignated as the 123d Fighter Squadron, Single Engine and was allotted to the Air National Guard, on 24 May 1946. It was organized at Portland Municipal Airport, Oregon, and was extended federal recognition on 26 June 1946.

The 123d was assigned to the 142d Fighter Group at Portland Municipal Airport. Thus the 142d began fighter operations for the first time in the North American North American F-51D Mustang with 75 officers and 800 enlisted men. The unit had a mission of the air defense of the State of Oregon.

==== Korean War activation ====
The squadron was called to active duty on 10 February 1951 as a result of the Korean War. It was redesignated the 123d Fighter-Interceptor Squadron and assigned to the 325th Fighter-Interceptor Wing, which was stationed at McChord Air Force Base, Washington, although the squadron remained at Portland Municipal Airport. However, Air Defense Command was experiencing difficulty under the existing wing base organizational structure in deploying its fighter squadrons to best advantage. As a result, in February 1952 the 123d was assigned to the 4704th Defense Wing, which was organized on a regional basis.

The squadron conducted air interception training missions with its F-51s until June 1952 when it was re-equipped with the North American F-86F Sabre daylight interceptor. On 1 November 1952, the 123rd was released back to the Oregon ANG and its personnel, mission and equipment were absorbed by the newly activated 357th Fighter-Interceptor Squadron.

==== Cold War ====
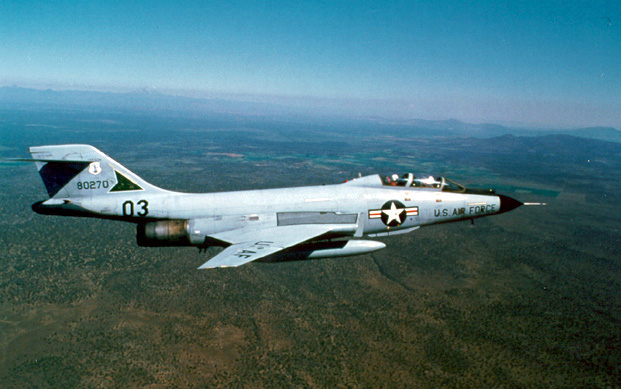
F-101B Voodoo from the 123rd Fighter-Interceptor Squadron (Note: Aircraft is McDonnell F-101B-105-MC Voodoo, serial 58-270, taken in 1974.)

Reformed as part of the 142d Fighter-Interceptor Group, retaining F-86F Sabres. It resumed its peacetime mission of the air defense of Oregon. Was upgraded by ADC in 1955 to the dedicated Lockheed F-94A Starfire all-weather interceptor. With this new aircraft, the mission of the 123d Fighter-Interceptor Squadron changed from day interceptor to day and night all-weather interceptor. In 1957 the 123d again upgraded to the improved Northrop F-89J Scorpion then in 1966 to the supersonic Convair F-102A Delta Dagger. In the summer of 1958, the 142d implemented the ADC Runway Alert Program, in which interceptors of the 123d Fighter-Interceptor Squadron were committed to a five-minute runway alert 24/7/365. The runway alert continues to this day.

In 1972 it received the Mach 2 McDonnell F-101B Voodoo. As an example of the unit's readiness and capability, in 1976, the unit won top honors at a pair of Aerospace Defense Command competitions, the Weapons Loading Competition and the William Tell Air Defense Competition. In William Tell 1976, the 142nd garnered first place in the F-101 category and Lt. Col. Don Tonole and Maj. Brad Newell captured the overall "Top Gun" title flying the McDonnell F-101B Voodoo.

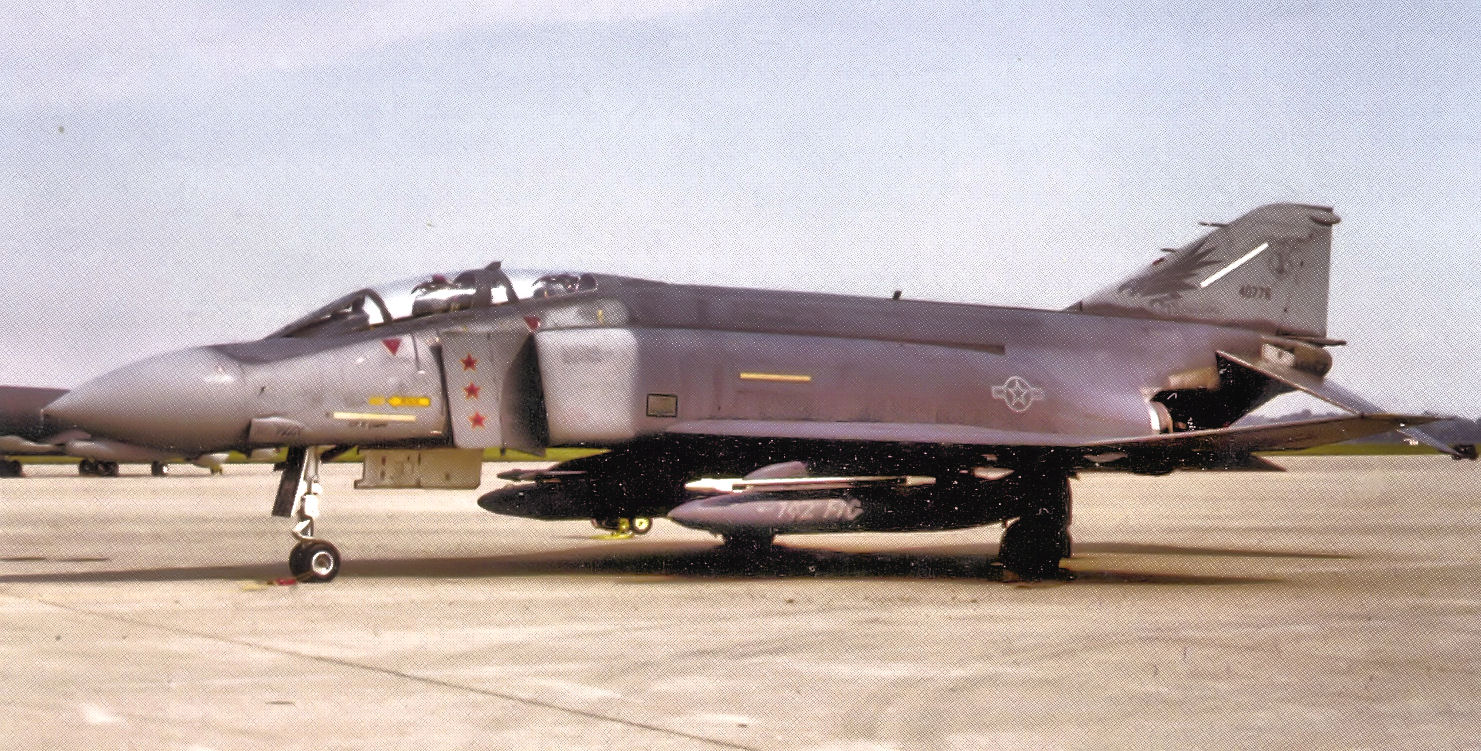
123d FIS McDonnell F-4C-23-MC Phantom about 1988 (Note: Aircraft is McDonnell F-4C-23-MC Phantom II, serial 64-776. Aircrews flying this aircraft during the Vietnam War were credited with the destruction of three MiGs.)

After the inactivation of Aerospace Defense Command in 1979 and the reassignment to Tactical Air Command (ADTAC), the 123d began receiving McDonnell F-4C Phantom II aircraft used in the interceptor mission beginning in 1981. Success came again at William Tell 1984 when the unit placed first in the F-4 category flying the McDonnell-Douglas F-4C Phantom II and beat many of its McDonnell F-15 Eagle and Convair F-106 Delta Dart rivals in the overall competition. Majors Ron Moore and Bill Dejager were the overall F-4 "Top Guns" of the competition.

In 1985, as part of the retirement of the F-4C from the inventory, the Oregon Air National Guard began to receive F-15A Eagles from active-duty units receiving the upgraded F-15C. Since the end of the Cold War, the 142d has served as the principal air defense unit of the Pacific Northwest. In 1992, as part of a large USAF reorganization, both the group and squadron were re-designated yet again as the 142d Fighter Group and the 123d Fighter Squadron, respectively. In 1995 the group was elevated to wing status, beginning its current designation as the 142d Fighter Wing.

The wing participated in a wide variety of expeditionary and humanitarian assistance missions in the turbulent post-Cold War environment while providing air defense of the Pacific Northwest. These included major deployments to Turkey in 1998 for Operation Northern Watch and to Saudi Arabia in 2000 for Operation Southern Watch, patrolling the no-fly zones then in place over Iraq. The wing deployed aircraft to Panama in 1998 in support of counter=drug missions, helping stem the flow of the drug trade by air. Wing personnel deployed on various other missions, sending medical troops to Belize, civil engineers to Macedonia, and to such places around the globe as Curaçao, Denmark, Germany, Guam, Kuwait, Spain and the United Kingdom.

==== Global War on Terrorism ====
On 11 September 2001, the wing was one of the first units to respond to terrorist attacks on the east coast with increased air defense to enhance security on the west coast, and subsequently participated in Operation Noble Eagle, the national military response to homeland defense.

In the 50th Year of William Tell Anniversary Competition held in 2004, the 142d Fighter Wing was rated first in maintenance, element attack and gun categories.

In 2004, unit personnel provided humanitarian aid in the wake of Hurricanes Katrina and Rita and the 2007 floods in Vernonia, Oregon. The wing also supported ongoing contingency operations in Southwest Asia, including Operation Iraqi Freedom and Operation Enduring Freedom, such as in the 2004 deployment of medical personnel to Qatar and the 2009 deployment of Security Forces Squadron personnel to Iraq.

In 2005, the early 1970s F-15A model were retired and the squadron received its current aircraft, the F-15C Eagle. With more than 1,000 officers and airmen, the 142d Fighter Wing guards the Pacific Northwest skies from northern California to the Canada–US border, on 24-hour Air Sovereignty Alert as part of Air Combat Command and the North American Aerospace Defense Command (NORAD). The wing also stands ready to participate in state and federal contingency missions as required.

In August 2010, two F-15 Eagles from this wing were dispatched in response to an airspace violation while the President visited Seattle, Washington. The jets produced two sonic booms over the Seattle skyline, the civilian Cessna 182 left restricted airspace before the jets arrived.

In August 2018, a Horizon Airlines Bombardier Dash 8 Q400 was stolen from Sea-Tac Int'l Airport by a mechanic. The plane was airborne for about an hour, and during that time performed several stunt maneuvers including a barrel roll. Two F-15C Eagles scrambled to intercept this aircraft to ensure it did not fly over any populated areas. They maintained communication with the pilot during his time in the air, but within minutes of their intercept, the plane nosedived and crashed into nearby Ketron Island, a sparsely populated island in the Puget Sound. There were no passengers or crew on board the plane, and the pilot was killed in the crash.

== Lineage ==
- Designated as the 123d Observation Squadron, and allotted to the National Guard on 30 July 1940

Activated on 18 April 1941
Ordered to active service on 15 September 1941
Redesignated 123d Observation Squadron (Light) on 13 January 1942
Redesignated 123d Observation Squadron on 4 July 1942
Redesignated 123d Reconnaissance Squadron (Bombardment) on 2 April 1943
Redesignated 35th Photographic Reconnaissance Squadron on 11 August 1943
Inactivated on 7 November 1945

- Redesignated 123d Fighter Squadron, Single Engine and allotted to the National Guard 24 May 1946

Extended federal recognition on 26 June 1946
Federalized and placed on active duty, 10 February 1951
Redesignated 123d Fighter-Interceptor Squadron on 1 March 1952
Inactivated and returned to Oregon state control on 1 November 1952
Activated c. 1 December 1952
Redesignated 123d Fighter Squadron 31 March 1992

=== Assignments ===
- Oregon National Guard, 18 April 1941
- 70th Observation Group (later 70th Reconnaissance Group), 15 September 1941
- 77th Tactical Reconnaissance Group, 11 August 1943 (attached to 70th Tactical Reconnaissance Group until 31 October 1943)
- III Reconnaissance Command (later III Tactical Air Command), 30 November 1943
- Army Air Forces, India-Burma Sector, 5 May 1944
- Fourteenth Air Force, c. September 1944
- Tenth Air Force, 1 August 1945
- Fourteenth Air Force, 25 August – 7 November 1945
- Oregon National Guard, 26 June 1946
- 142d Fighter Group, 30 August 1946
- Fourth Air Force, 10 February 1951 (attached to 325th Fighter-Interceptor Wing)
- 4704th Air Defense Wing, 6 February 1952 – 1 November 1952
- 142d Fighter-Interceptor Group (later 142d Fighter Group, 142d Fighter-Interceptor Group, 142d Fighter Wing), 1 December 1952
- 142d Operations Group, 1 March 1994

=== Stations ===
- Portland Airport, Oregon, 18 April 1941
- Gray Field, Washington, 25 September 1941 (detachment operated from Bowerman Field, Washington, 15 March – c. August 1942
- Ontario Army Air Field, California, 16 March 1943
- Roberts Field, California, 20 August 1943
- Gainesville Army Air Field, Texas, 10 November 1943
- Will Rogers Field, Oklahoma, 5 February – 10 April 1944
- Guskhara Airfield, India, 13 June 1944
- Kunming Airfield, China, 1 September 1944

Flight at Nanning Airfield, China, 16 September – 6 October 1944
Flight at Yunnani Airfield, China, 16 September 1944 – 10 February 1945

- Chanyi Airfield, China, 17 September 1944

Flight at Chihkiang Airfield, China, 19 October 1944 – c. 1 September 1945
Flight at Suichwan Airfield, China, 19 November 1944 – 22 January 1945
Flight at Chengkung Airfield, China, 10 February – 13 May 1945
Flight at Laohwangping Airfield, China, 27 February-c. 1 September 1945
Flight at Kunming Airport, China, 14 May – 31 July 1945
Flight at Nanning Airfield, China, 31 July – c. 1 September 1945

- Luliang Airfield, China, 18–24 September 1945
- Camp Kilmer, New Jersey, 5–7 November 1945
- Portland International Airport, Oregon, 26 June 1946 – 1 November 1952
- Portland International Airport, Oregon, 1 December 1952 – present

Designated Portland Air National Guard Base, Oregon, 1991–present

=== Aircraft ===
- North American O-47, 1941–1943
- Stinson O-49 Vigilant, 1941–1943
- Douglas O-46, 1941–1942
- North American B-25 Mitchell, 1943–1944, 1945
- Douglas A-20 Havoc, 1943
- Douglas DB-7 Boston, 1943
- Bell P-39 Airacobra, 1943–1944
- Lockheed P-38 Lightning, 1944
- Lockheed F-5 Lightning, 1944–1945
- North American F-51D Mustang, 1946–1952
- North American F-86F Sabre, 1952–1955
- Lockheed F-94A Starfire, 1955–1957
- Northrop F-89J Scorpion, 1957–1966
- Convair F-102A Delta Dagger, 1966–1971
- McDonnell F-101B Voodoo, 1972–1981

F-15EX Eagle II from the 123rd Fighter Squadron (Note: This Aircraft is a Boeing F-15EX Eagle II, Registration 21-0020, The Newest F-15EX in the 123rd Fighter Squadron)

- McDonnell F-4C Phantom II, 1981–1989
- McDonnell F-15A/B Eagle, 1989–2009
- McDonnell F-15C/D Eagle, 2007–present (planned retirement date 2025)
- Boeing F-15EX Eagle II, 2024–present

== See also ==
- List of observation squadrons of the United States Army National Guard
