= Beuzeville-au-Plain =

- Part of Sainte-Mère-Église
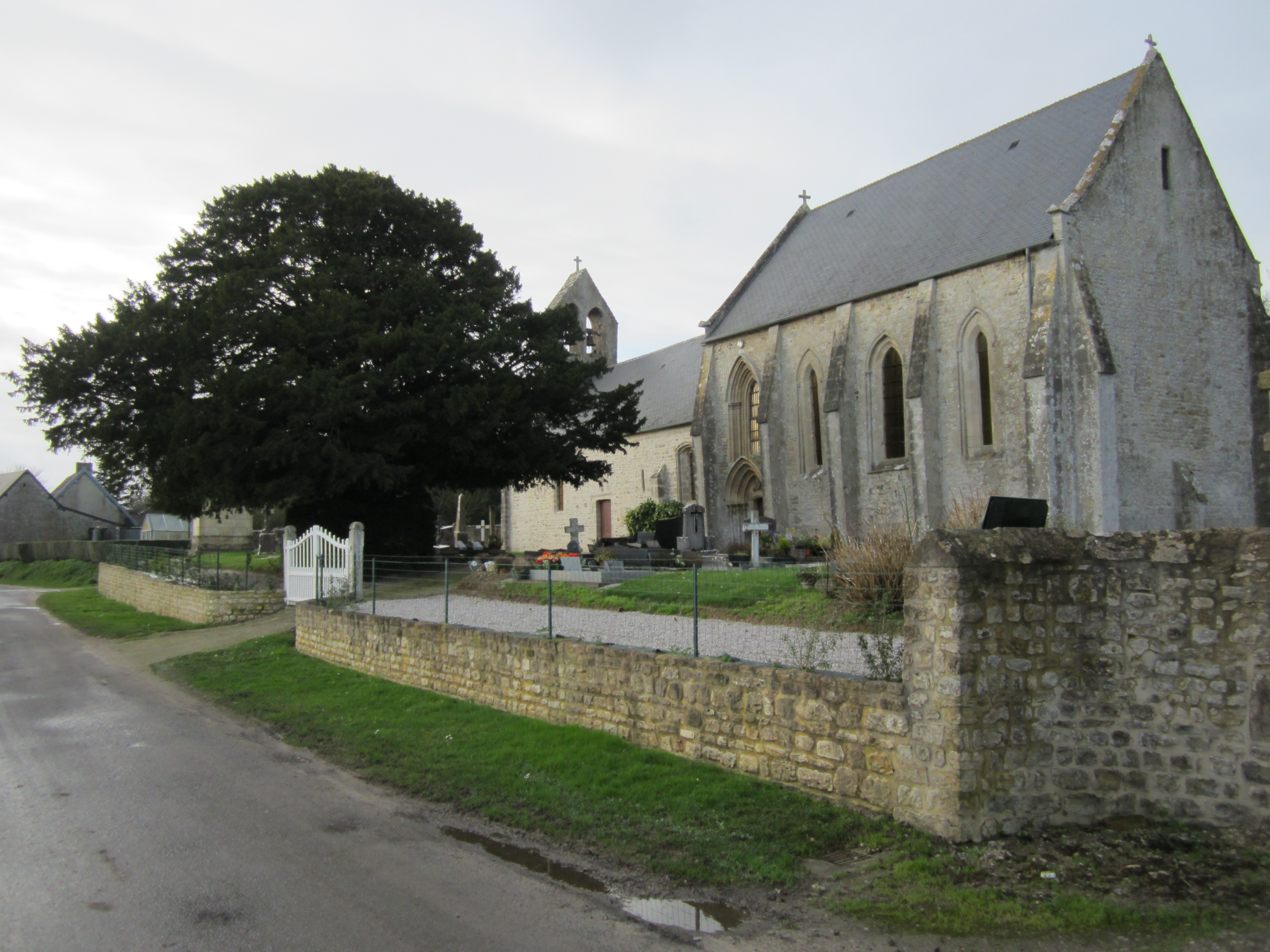
- The church of Saint-Brice
- Location of Beuzeville-au-Plain
- Location within France Location within Normandy
- Coordinates: 49°25′53″N 1°17′06″W
- Country: France
- Region: Normandy
- Department: Manche
- Arrondissement: Cherbourg
- Canton: Carentan
- Commune: Sainte-Mère-Église
- Area^{1}: 2.04 km^{2} (0.79 sq mi)
- Elevation: 27 m (89 ft)
- Highest elevation: 41 m (135 ft)
- Lowest elevation: 14 m (46 ft)
- Population (2023): 40
  - Density: 20/km^{2} (51/sq mi)
- Time zone: UTC+01:00 (CET)
  - Summer (DST): UTC+02:00 (CEST)
- Postal code: 50480
- ^{1} French Land Register data, which excludes lakes, ponds, glaciers > 1 km^{2} (0.386 sq mi or 247 acres) and river estuaries.

Beuzeville-au-Plain (French pronunciation: [bøzvil o plɛ̃]) is a former commune in the Manche department in the Normandy region in northwestern France. On 1 January 2016, it was merged into the commune of Sainte-Mère-Église.

== World War II ==
After the liberation of the area by Allied Forces in early June 1944, engineers of the Ninth Air Force IX Engineering Command began construction of a combat Advanced Landing Ground to the south of the town. Declared operational on 15 June, the airfield was designated as "A-6", it was initially used by the 371st Fighter Group which flew P-47 Thunderbolts until mid-September when the unit moved into Central France. Along with the 371st, the 367th Fighter Group flew P-38 Lightnings from the airfield. It was used until mid-September when it was closed.

== See also ==
- Communes of the Manche department
