= Oregon Air National Guard =

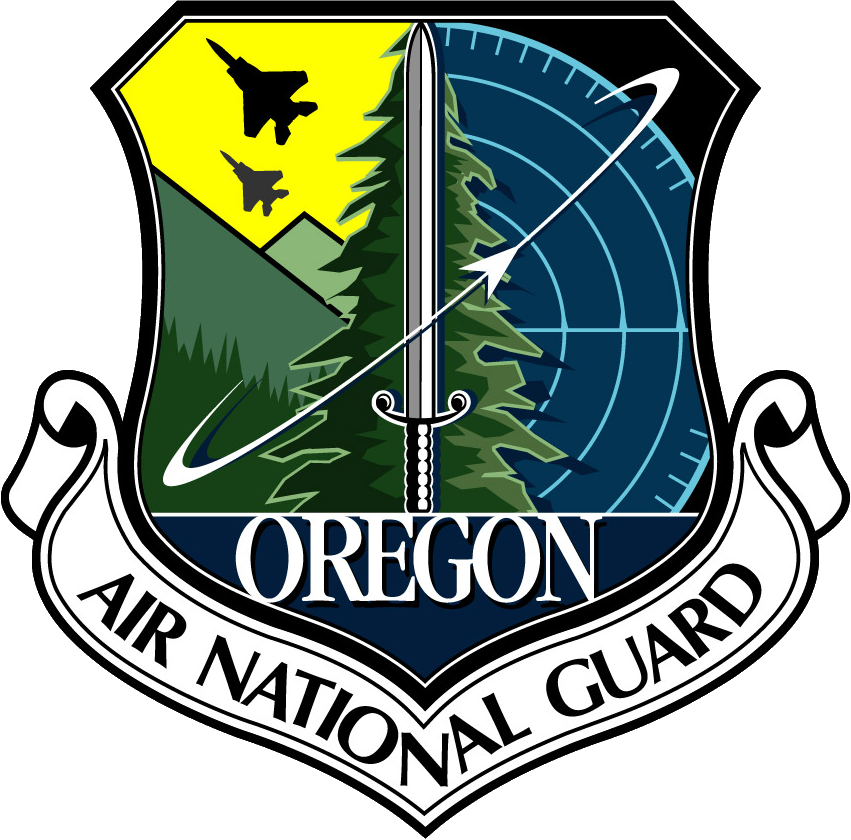
- Oregon Air National Guard logo
- Active: 18 April 1941– present
- Country: United States
- Branch: Air National Guard
- Type: State militia, military reserve force
- Role: "To meet state and federal mission responsibilities."
- Part of: Oregon Military Department; United States National Guard Bureau
- Garrison/HQ: Oregon Military Department, 1776 Militia Way SE, Salem, Oregon
- Mottos: "When we are needed, we are there."

Commanders
- Civilian leadership: President Donald Trump (Commander-in-Chief(when federalized)); Troy Meink (Secretary of the Air Force); Governor Tina Kotek (Commander-in-Chief)
- State Adjutant General: Brigadier General Alan R. Gronewold, USA
- Commander, Air Component: Brig. General David N. Unruh, USAF
- State Command Chief: CCM Brent Cavanais, USAF

Insignia
- Headquarters Oregon Air Guard emblem

Aircraft flown
- Fighter: F-15C/D Eagle Boeing F-15EX Eagle II Lockheed Martin F-35

The Oregon Air National Guard (OR ANG) is the aerial militia of the State of Oregon, United States of America. It is a reserve of the United States Air Force and along with the Oregon Army National Guard an element of the Oregon National Guard of the United States National Guard Bureau.

As state militia units, the units in the Oregon Air National Guard are not in the normal United States Air Force chain of command. They are under the jurisdiction of the governor of Oregon though the office of the Oregon Adjutant General unless they are federalized by order of the president of the United States. The Oregon Air National Guard is headquartered at the Oregon Military Department buildings in Salem.

== Overview ==
Under the "Total Force" concept, Oregon Air National Guard units are considered to be Air Reserve Components (ARC) of the United States Air Force (USAF). Oregon ANG units are trained and equipped by the Air Force and are operationally gained by a major command of the USAF if federalized. In addition, the Oregon Air National Guard forces are assigned to Air Expeditionary Forces and are subject to deployment tasking orders along with their active duty and Air Force Reserve counterparts in their assigned cycle deployment window.

Along with its federal obligations, the Oregon ANG may be activated by order of the governor to provide protection of life and property, and preserve peace, order and public safety. State missions include disaster relief in times of earthquakes, hurricanes, floods and forest fires, search and rescue, protection of vital public services, and support to civil defense.

== Components ==
The Oregon Air National Guard consists of the following major units:

- 142nd Wing
- 123d Fighter Squadron

Established 18 April 1941 (as: 123rd Observation Squadron); operates: F-15C/D Eagle, and the Boeing F-15EX Eagle II
Stationed at: Portland Air National Guard Base, Portland
Gained by: Air Combat Command and Air Force Special Operations Command
The 142nd Wing consists of over 1,000 officers and airmen, the "Redhawks" guard the Pacific Northwest airspace and coastal waters from northern California to the Canada–US border with F-15 Eagles on 24-hour Air Sovereignty alert. Both operational and training missions take 142d Wing units around the globe in support of drug interdiction, Air Expeditionary Force missions, and contingency operations.
The 142nd Wing is also home to the 125th Special Tactics Squadron, which conducts a wide array of special forces operations both domestically, and internationally. According to the 125th STS mission statement, the squadron is "poised for full spectrum rapid response to all crises and contingencies at home or abroad". Additionally, the 125th STS is one of only two Special Tactics Units in the Air National Guard. The inclusion of the 125th STS under the Wing led to the organization re-designating itself as the 142nd Wing in order to better articulate the varied capabilities of the organization.

- 173rd Fighter Wing

Established 1 January 1983 (as: 8123rd Fighter-Interceptor Training Squadron); Wing plans operate the F-35A training in 2026 for needs of Indo-Pacific Command
Stationed at: Kingsley Field Air National Guard Base, Klamath Falls, Oregon
Gained by: Air Combat Command
Originally an interceptor pilot training squadron, today the wing is an advanced training organization responsible for all USAF Reserve and Air National Guard Personnel F-15C/D pilot and Maintenance specialization training.

== History ==
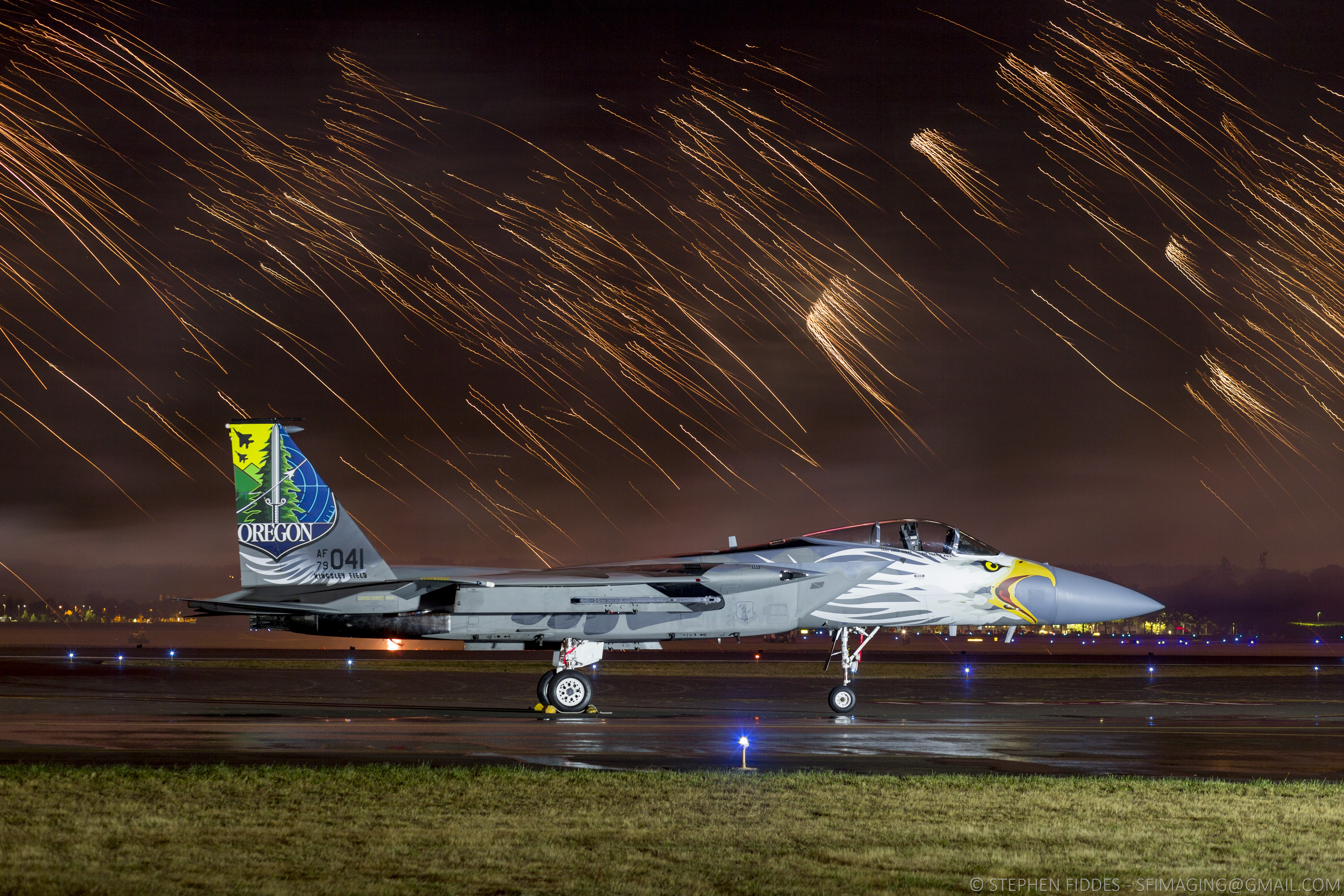
An F-15 of the 173rd Fighter Wing with the Oregon Air National Guard 75th Anniversary commemorative paint job at the Oregon International Air Show, 2016

The Oregon Air National Guard origins date to 30 July 1940 with the establishment of the 123rd Observation Squadron and is oldest unit of the Oregon Air National Guard. It is one of the 29 original National Guard Observation Squadrons of the United States Army National Guard formed before World War II. The unit consisted of two officers, 108 enlisted men and two aircraft, a North American BC-1A (like the AT-6) and a Douglas O-46A. The squadron flew observation missions primarily along the Pacific Coast and occasionally made mail flights. The 123rd Observation Squadron was ordered into active service on 15 September 1941 as part of the buildup of the Army Air Corps prior to the United States entry into World War II.

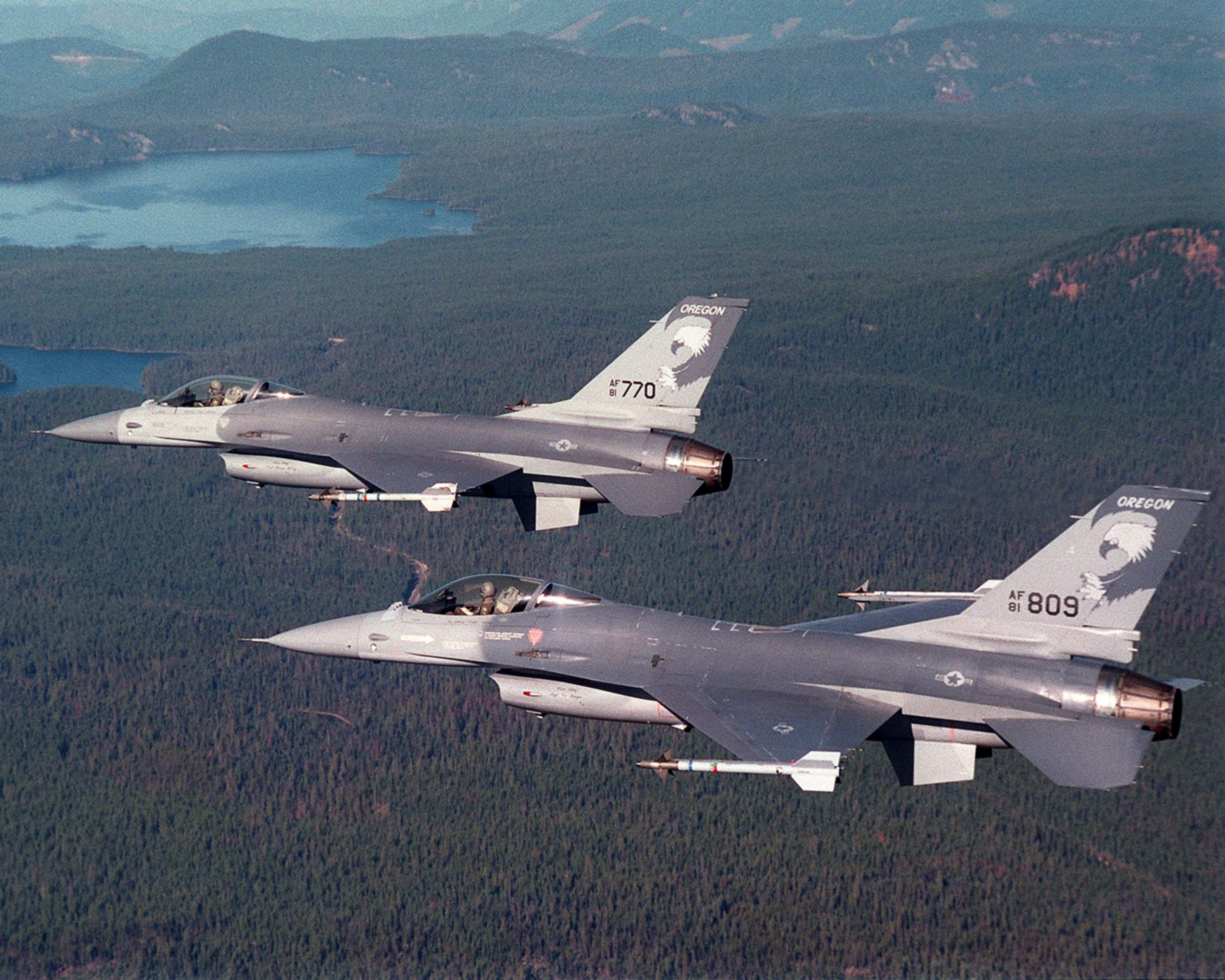
F-16A's from the 114th Tactical Fighter Training Squadron flying over Klamath Falls, July 1990.

On 24 May 1946 the United States Army Air Forces, in response to dramatic postwar military budget cuts, imposed by President Harry S. Truman, allocated inactive unit designations to the National Guard Bureau for the formation of an Air Force National Guard. These unit designations were allotted and transferred to various State National Guard bureaus to provide them unit designations to re-establish them as Air National Guard units.

The modern Oregon ANG received federal recognition on 30 August 1946 as the 142nd Fighter Group at Portland Municipal Airport, Portland. Its 123rd Fighter Squadron was equipped with F-51D Mustangs and its mission was the air defense of the state. 18 September 1947, however, is considered the Oregon Air National Guard's official birth concurrent with the establishment of the United States Air Force as a separate branch of the United States military under the National Security Act

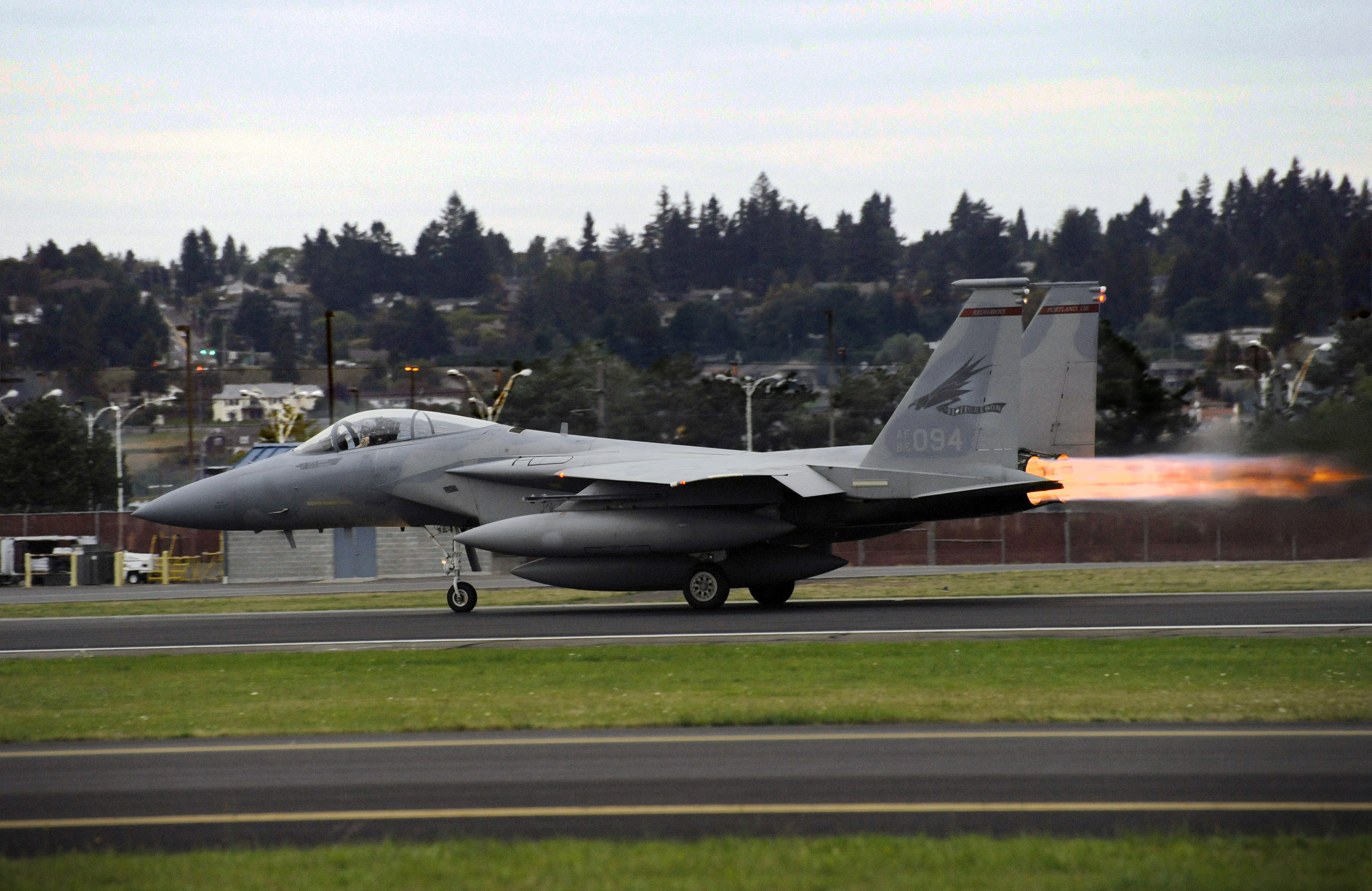
An F-15C Eagle of the 123rd Fighter Squadron at Portland ANGB.

Today the 142nd Fighter Wing at Portland and the 173rd Fighter Wing at Klamath Falls both fly the F-15 Eagle with a homeland defense mission. After the 11 September 2001 terrorist attacks on the United States, elements of every Air National Guard unit in Oregon were activated. Flight crews, aircraft maintenance personnel, communications technicians, air controllers and air security personnel were engaged in Operation Noble Eagle air defense overflights of major United States cities. Oregon ANG units were deployed overseas as part of Operation Enduring Freedom in Afghanistan and Operation Iraqi Freedom in Iraq as well as other locations as directed.

In April 2016, the Oregon Air National Guard celebrated its 75th anniversary with a commemorative paint job on one of the 173rd Fighter Wing's F-15's, as seen below.

== See also ==
- Oregon Civil Defense Force
- Oregon Wing Civil Air Patrol
