= Perthes, Haute-Marne =

Perthes
- Commune
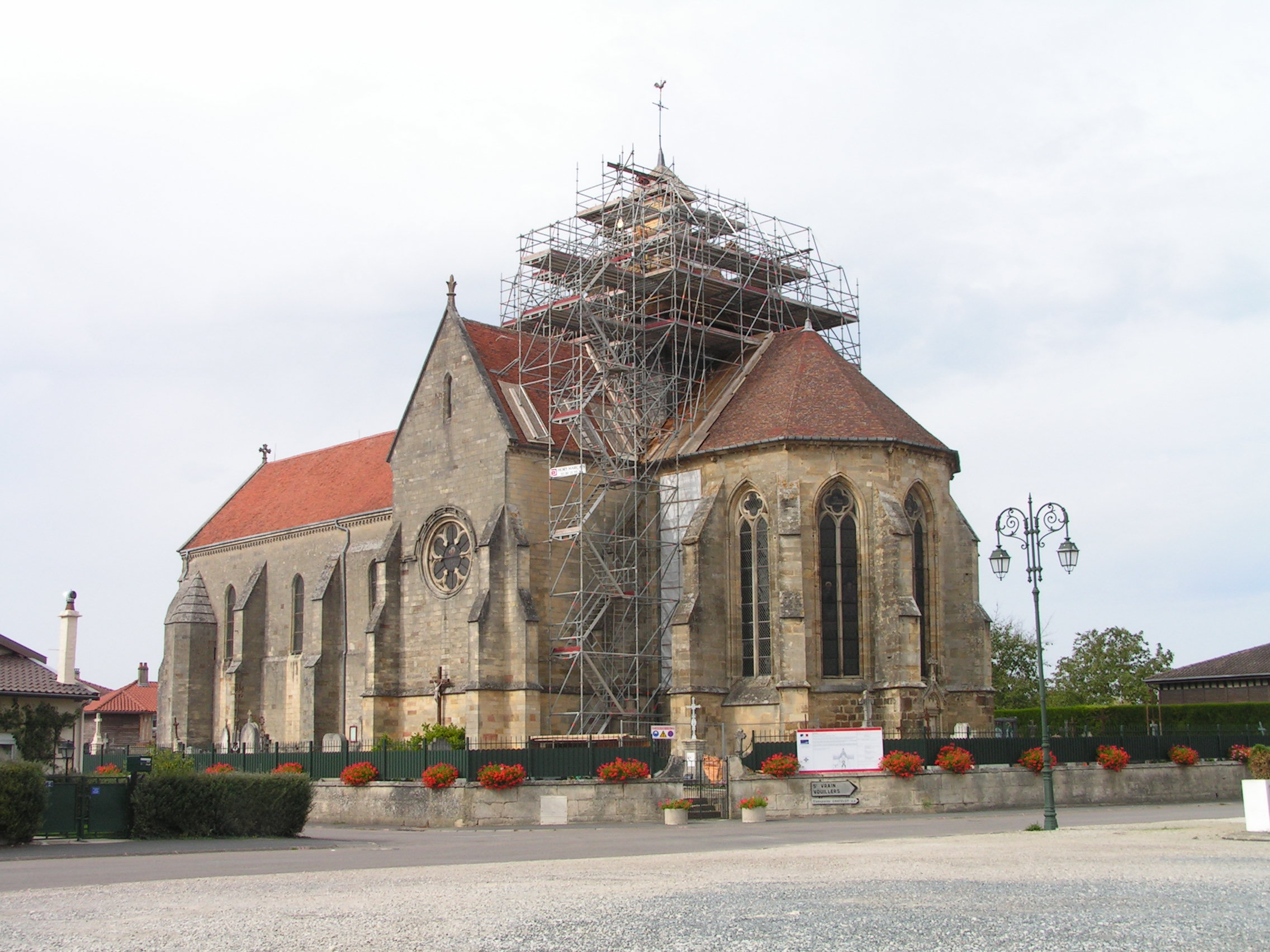
- The church in Perthes
- Location of Perthes
- Location within France Location within Grand Est
- Coordinates: 48°39′25″N 4°49′22″E
- Country: France
- Region: Grand Est
- Department: Haute-Marne
- Arrondissement: Saint-Dizier
- Canton: Saint-Dizier-1
- Intercommunality: CA Grand Saint-Dizier, Der et Vallées

Government
  - Mayor (2020–2026): Marie-Claude Saget-Thyes
- Area^{1}: 13.08 km^{2} (5.05 sq mi)
- Elevation: 128 m (420 ft)
- Highest elevation: 134 m (440 ft)
- Lowest elevation: 121 m (397 ft)
- Population (2023): 518
  - Density: 39.6/km^{2} (103/sq mi)
- Time zone: UTC+01:00 (CET)
  - Summer (DST): UTC+02:00 (CEST)
- INSEE/Postal code: 52386 /52100
- ^{1} French Land Register data, which excludes lakes, ponds, glaciers > 1 km^{2} (0.386 sq mi or 247 acres) and river estuaries.

Perthes (French pronunciation: [pɛʁt]) is a commune in the Haute-Marne department in north-eastern France.

== World War II ==
After the liberation of the area by Allied Forces in September 1944, engineers of the Ninth Air Force IX Engineering Command began construction of a combat Advanced Landing Ground outside of the town. Declared operational on 9 September, the airfield was designated as "A-65", it was used by several combat units until October when the units moved forward with the advancing Allies. Afterward, the airfield was closed.

== See also ==
- Communes of the Haute-Marne department
