= Portland Air National Guard Base =

United States Air Force base

- Portland, Oregon in the United States
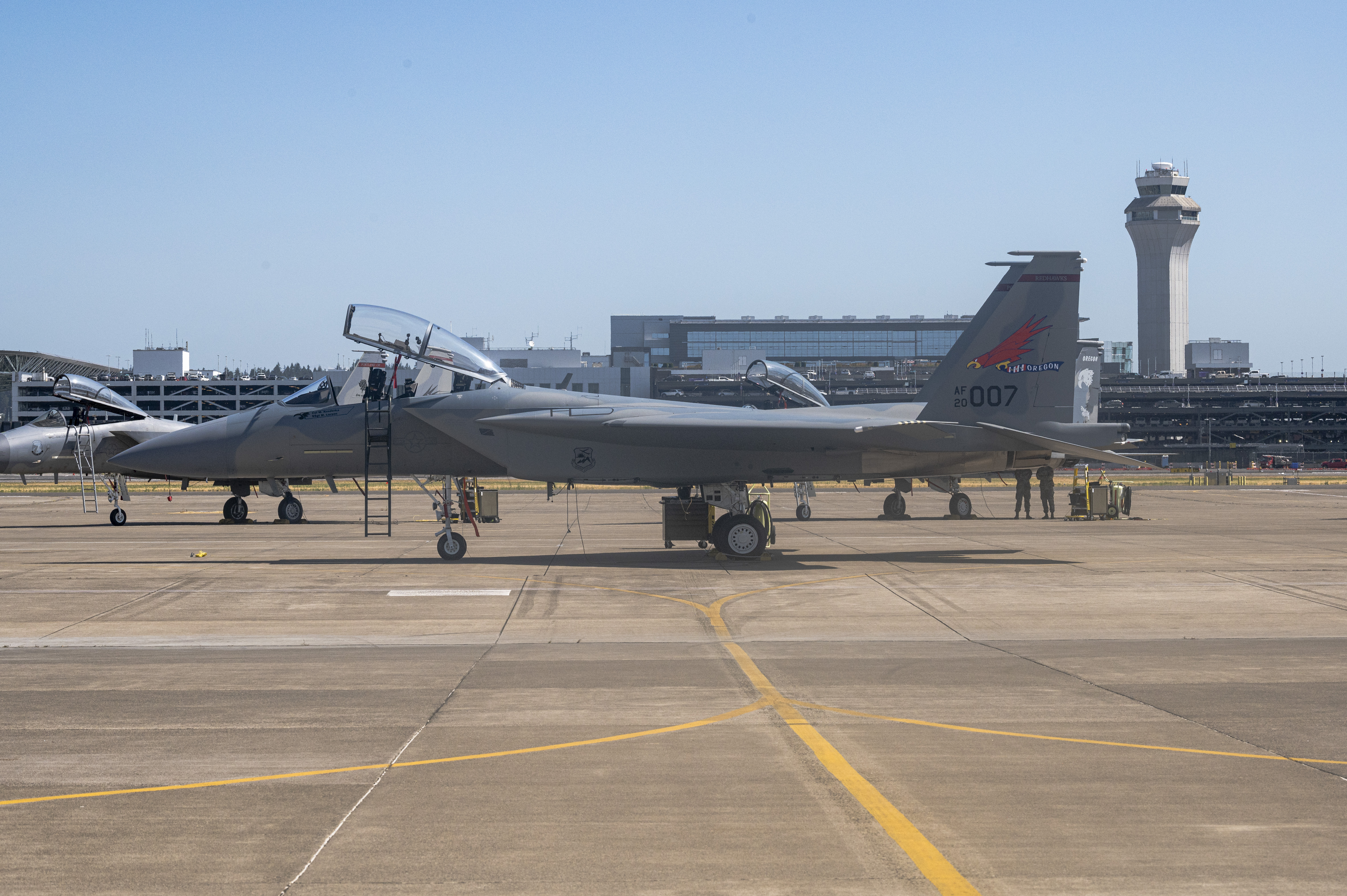
- F-15EX Eagle IIs of the Oregon Air National Guard's 142nd Fighter Wing at Portland Air National Guard Base in 2024.

Site information
- Type: Air National Guard base
- Owner: Department of Defense
- Operator: US Air Force (USAF)
- Controlled by: Oregon Air National Guard
- Condition: Operational

Location
- Location in the United States
- Coordinates: 45°34′56″N 122°35′23″W

Site history
- Built: 1940 (as Portland Army Air Base)
- In use: 1940 – present

Garrison information
- Garrison: 142nd Wing

Airfield information
- Identifiers: IATA: PDX, ICAO: KPDX, FAA LID: PDX, WMO: 726980
- Elevation: 9.4 meters (31 ft) AMSL
Runways
Direction	Length and surface
10R/28L	3,352.8 meters (11,000 ft) Concrete
10L/28R	2,994.6 meters (9,825 ft) Asphalt
3/12	1,828.8 meters (6,000 ft) Asphalt
- Airfield shared with Portland International Airport; Source: Federal Aviation Administration

Portland Air National Guard Base is a United States Air Force base, located at Portland International Airport, in Portland, Oregon.

== Overview ==
The base is the home of the 142nd Wing, Oregon Air National Guard. The 142nd FW participates around the globe supporting drug interdiction, NORAD air defense, as well as contingency operations such as Operations Noble Eagle, Enduring Freedom, and Iraqi Freedom. To complete these missions, four groups are assigned to the 142nd Wing: 142nd Operations Group, 142nd Maintenance Group, 142nd Mission Support Group and the 142nd Medical Group.

In addition, the Portland, Oregon Air National Guard Base is host to several tenant units:

- 142nd Operations Group
- 142nd Mission Support Group
- 142nd Maintenance Group
- 142nd Medical Group
- 142nd Security Forces Squadron
- 123d Fighter Squadron
- 123rd Weather Flight Squadron
- 125th Special Tactics Squadron
- Air Force Reserve 304th Rescue Squadron.

Additionally to National Guard activities, the air base serves as the headquarters for the 73rd Columbia Composite Squadron of the Civil Air Patrol.

== History ==
The base's history begins in 1936 when Works Progress Administration (WPA) funding allowed the City of Portland to purchase 700 acres of land along the Columbia River and bordering the Columbia Slough for a "Super Airport" to replace an earlier facility established in 1926.

On 1 July 1940 the GHQ Air Force Northwest Air District established a small depot to provide service for military aircraft using the airport. The 57th Service Squadron moved to the airport from Hamilton Field, California on 31 March 1941, the Air Corps facilities being designated Portland Army Air Base. Due to tensions between the United States and the Japanese Empire, the Oregon National Guard, sent its 123d Observation Squadron with North American O-47s to conduct patrols over the Columbia River approaches and the Oregon Pacific coastline.

The initial Air Corps use of the base was when Northwest Air District moved the 55th Pursuit Group (Interceptor) to the new base in late May 1941 from Hamilton Field. Three squadrons of P-43 Lancers (the predecessor to the Republic P-47 Thunderbolt) operated from the base. Portland AAB was also used as a transport field, with the 64th Transport Group at March Field, California stationing its 16th Transport Squadron at the base in July 1941 with C-47s. Later, during World War II, the base was a very active air transport center handling about 47 military transport landings a day.

=== World War II ===
After the Pearl Harbor Attack, the 17th Bombardment Group at Pendleton Airport in Northeast Oregon, now called Eastern Oregon Regional Airport, sent the B-25 Mitchell-equipped 34th Bombardment Squadron (as part of the Sierra Bombardment Group) to conduct antisubmarine and coastal patrols along the Pacific Coast. The P-43s from the 55th PG also flew reconnaissance missions until February 1942 when they were moved to Paine Field, Washington (although two of the squadrons had been dispersed to various fields in the Pacific Northwest right after the attack).

The 42d Bombardment Group used Portland for a B-25 Mitchell training base early in the war. Its 75th Bombardment Squadron moved to the field in January 1942, and until March trained B-25 combat crews. The squadron itself was deployed to New Caledonia in April and entered combat in June of that year.

The 28th Composite Group at Elmendorf Field, Alaska Territory stationed its 406th Bombardment Squadron at Portland during the summer and fall of 1942 as a B-25 OTU. Pilots and crews were then deployed to the Aleutian Campaign. The squadron moved to Alaska in November to engage the Japanese in combat, after the end of the campaign in October 1943, it returned briefly to Portland in October 1943 for re-equipping with new B-25s from North American before again deploying to RAF Alconbury, England. The 47th Bombardment Squadron (41st Bombardment Group) also received B-25s at Portland prior to its deployment to the Pacific Theater at Tarawa.

In late 1943, IV Fighter Command established a third-phase fighter training program at Portland, to finish training of squadrons after their initial formation. The 354th Fighter Group moved to field in October 1943, and flew P-39 Airacobras for about a month before deploying to England. The 354th, however was the only combat unit to train at Portland, with Fourth Air Force converting the field to a replacement training field. The 372d Fighter Group was assigned to Portland in November 1943, and performed the RTU mission with three squadrons of P-39s until March 1944. It was reassigned to Third Air Force in Louisiana in April 1944.

With the departure of the fighter RTU in April 1944, Portland Army Air Base returned to its transport mission for the remainder of the war, being operated jointly with the civilian airport. It was inactivated in 1946.

=== Cold War ===
In 1947, the Tactical Air Command (TAC) re-established a United States Air Force presence at Portland Airport, Portland Air Force Base being activated as a joint military/civil facility.

The Air Force Reserve 349th Troop Carrier Group at Hamilton AFB, California began deploying C-46 Commando transports of several troop carrier squadrons to the airport under the TAC Twelfth Reserve Area. In 1949, the USAFR 403d Troop Carrier Wing, Medium, was stationed at the airport. In 1952, the 406th deployed to Far East Air Forces in Japan for Korean War duty. It returned to Portland in 1953 and remained until 1957, flying C-119 Flying Boxcars until being moved to Selfridge AFB, Michigan.

In March 1948, Air Defense Command (ADC) activated an AN/TPS-1B radar at Portland Airport. It was installed and activated on a 24-hour-a-day basis in March 1948 as an 'Interim' site to protect the air approaches to Hanford, Washington. In August 1950, the site was incorporated into the 'Lashup' system, given designation "L-33". In 1951 the AN/TPS-1B search radar was joined by an AN/CPS-5 search radar. Operations ceased in February 1952 with the activation of site "P-12" at North Bend AFS in southern Oregon.

In 1952 jurisdiction of Portland AFB was transferred from TAC to Air Defense Command. ADC activated the 503d Air Defense Group on 1 February 1952. The 503d ADG controlled the F-94 Starfire 497th Fighter-Interceptor Squadron and the F-86D Sabre 357th Fighter-Interceptor Squadron from the base. In 1955, the group was re-designated as the 357th Fighter Group. The 357th remained at Portland, controlling several interceptor squadrons until 30 March 1966 when ADC inactivated the base.

=== Oregon Air National Guard and Air Force Reserve Command ===
The 142d Fighter Group was activated at Portland on 1 March 1951. The Group being allocated to the Oregon ANG on 24 May 1946, being re-designated from the World War II 371st Fighter Group.

After Air Defense Command closed its facilities in 1966, Portland AFB was inactivated and the military facilities were reduced in size. The 142nd Fighter Interceptor Group became the host unit of the military facilities at Portland International Airport. Around 1990, the Air Force facilities were designated as Portland Air Reserve Station, being a secure facility on the south side of the main airport runway and remaining a very active presence at the airport. Following a major overhaul of the USAF organizational structure in 1992, the 142d was redesignated as the 142d Fighter Wing (142 FW) and became an Air National Guard unit operationally-gained by the Air Combat Command (ACC).

In addition to the Oregon Air National Guard, the facility also hosted the 939th Rescue Wing (939 RQW) of the Air Force Reserve Command (AFRC), equipped with HC-130 and HH-60 combat search and rescue (CSAR) aircraft. In 2000, the 939 RQW began to divest itself of the CSAR mission, transitioning to the KC-135 Stratotanker aircraft and being redesignated as the 939th Air Refueling Wing (939 ARW).

BRAC 2005 brought the F-15C/D to the 142 FW, replacing its early 1970s A/B model Eagles, as well as directing the inactivation of the 939 ARW by 2008. The BRAC commission retained the 142 FW's Expeditionary Combat Support elements at the installation, to be renamed Portland Air National Guard Base, along with the 244th and 272d Combat Communications Squadrons (ANG), and the 304th Rescue Squadron (AFRC), the 304th to be a geographically separated unit (GSU) of the Air Force Reserve Command's 920th Rescue Wing in Florida.

On 10 August 2018, two F-15C's from the 142nd, both originally Massachusetts Air National Guard fighters on a "swap" to the Oregon Air National Guard, intercepted a stolen Horizon Air Bombardier Q400 turboprop over Seattle. The fighters armed with live AIM-9 Sidewinder and AIM-120 AMRAAM missiles, intercepted and escorted the plane away from populated areas before it crashed on Ketron Island near McChord Air Force Base.

=== Major units assigned ===
- 55th Pursuit Group, 21 May 1941 – 10 February 1942
- 354th Fighter Group, 2 June–5 October 1943
- 372d Fighter Group, 7 December 1943 – 29 March 1944
- 337th Fighter Group, 18 August 1955 – 30 March 1966
- 403d Troop Carrier Wing, 27 June 1949 – 29 March 1952; 1 January 1953 – 16 November 1957
- 454th Bombardment Wing, 13 June 1952 – 1 January 1953
- 503d Air Defense Group, 16 February 1953

Re-designated: 337th Fighter Group (Air Defense), 18 August 1955 – 25 March 1966

460th Fighter-Interceptor Squadron, 18 May 1955 – 30 March 1966

- 136th Aircraft Control and Warning Squadron (Federalized TX ANG) 1 February 1952 – 1 October 1953
- 123d Fighter Interceptor Squadron (Federalized OR ANG), 10 February 1951

Replaced by: 357th Fighter-Interceptor Squadron, 1 November 1952 – 25 May 1953

- 497th Fighter-Interceptor Squadron, 18 February 1953 – 18 August 1955
- 689th Aircraft Control and Warning Squadron, 1 October 1953 – 1 July 1956

== Future ==
In August 2020, it was announced that Portland will planned host the Air Force's first operational F-15EX unit from 2025. The F-15EX is intended to replace the ageing F-15C/D Eagle.

== Accidents ==
- On 22 October 1964, two F-102 Delta Daggers collided shortly after taking off and crashed, killing one pilot and injuring the other.

== See also ==
- List of USAF Aerospace Defense Command General Surveillance Radar Stations
- Aerospace Defense Command Fighter Squadrons
