= Perthes Airfield =

Perthes Airfield Advanced Landing Ground (ALG) A-65

- Champagne-Ardenne Region, France Perthes Airfield (France)

Site information
- Type: Military airfield
- Controlled by: United States Army Air Forces

Location
- Coordinates: 48°39′25″N 004°49′21″E

Site history
- Built by: IX Engineering Command
- In use: September–October 1944
- Materials: Grass

Perthes Airfield is an abandoned World War II military airfield, which is located near the commune of Perthes in the Champagne-Ardenne department of northern France.

Located probably north of the commune, it was a United States Army Air Force temporary airfield established during the Northern France Campaign in September 1944. Its primary use was for P-47 Thunderbolt fighters of the Ninth Air Force 371st Fighter Group.

== History ==
Known as Advanced Landing Ground "A-65", the airfield consisted of a single 5000' grass runway aligned 10/28. In addition, with tents were used for billeting and also for support facilities; an access road was built to the existing road infrastructure; a dump for supplies, ammunition, and gasoline drums, along with a drinkable water and minimal electrical grid for communications and station lighting.

Combat units stationed at the airfield were the 371st Fighter Group, between 18 September-1 October 1944 which flew support missions during the Allied invasion of Normandy, patrolling roads in front of the beachhead; strafing German military vehicles and dropping bombs on gun emplacements, anti-aircraft artillery and concentrations of German troops when spotted.

After the Americans moved east with the advancing Allied Armies, the airfield was closed on 5 October 1944, and the land was returned to its owners. Today there is little or no physical evidence of its existence or its location.

== See also ==
- Advanced Landing Ground
