= Laohwangping Airfield =

Defunct World War II USAAF airfield, China

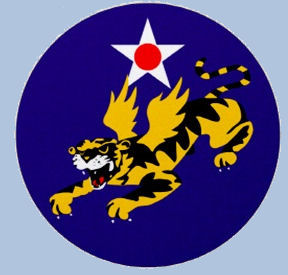
Laohwangping Airfield
- Part of Fourteenth Air Force
- Jiuzhou Zhen, Huangping County, Guizhou Province, Republic of China

Site information
- Type: Military airfield
- Controlled by: United States Army Air Forces

Location
- Coordinates: 27°00′00″N 107°45′35″E

Site history
- Battles/wars: China Defensive Campaign 1942-1945

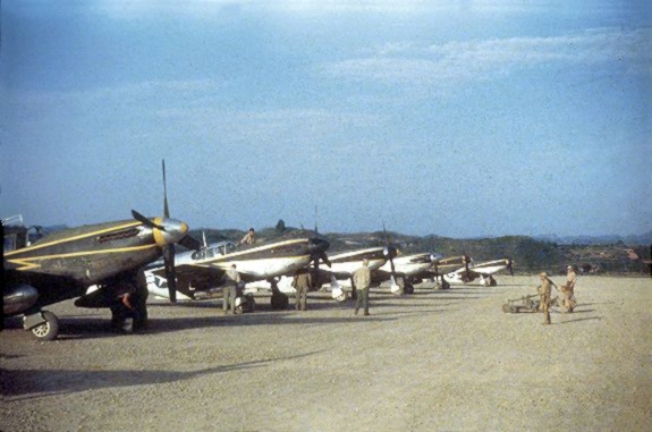
P-51 Mustang flightline, Laohwangping Airfield, June 1945.

Laohwangping Airfield (Chinese: 旧州机场) is a former World War II United States Army Air Forces airfield, located approximately 1 mile west of Jiuzhou Zhen (旧州镇), Huangping County, Guizhou Province, then in the Republic of China.

== Role in WWII ==
It was designed to be a refuelling station for aircraft coming from Chihkiang Airfield, Hunan,. Eventually it became the primary home of the 35th Photographic Reconnaissance Squadron, which flew unarmed P-38 Lightning photo-reconnaissance aircraft from the airfield beginning in February 1945 until the end of the war. It was also the home of the 23d Fighter Group 76th Fighter Squadron, equipped with P-51 Mustangs in February 1945.

== Construction ==
The airfield was slowly built from 1939. Serious construction only began from October 1943 as the Wu Dingchang (吴鼎昌), Governor of Guizhou, came to rally. It is officially opened from early 1945, yet it was partially operational and began in use from late 1943. It has a compressed earth runway with tents and small wooden buildings used for a support facility.

It appears to have been closed and dismantled in September 1945 after the war ended, with the land being returned to agricultural use. The available satellite image of this area of China is very low resolution and it is difficult to determine if any relics of the airfield exist.
