= Oregon Civil Defense Force =

- Active: 1961–2015, 2019–present
- Country: United States
- Allegiance: Oregon
- Type: State defense force
- Role: Military reserve force
- Part of: Oregon Military Department
- Garrison/HQ: Headquarters, ORSDF Camp Withycombe 10101 SE Clackamas Road, Bldg. 6305 Clackamas, OR 97015
- Website: Oregon Civil Defense Force Website

Commanders
- Civilian leadership: Governor Tina Kotek; Commander-in-Chief Roberta Janssen; Administrative Officer
- State military leadership: Brigadier General Alan R. Gronewold

The Oregon Civil Defense Force (ORCDF), formerly known as the Oregon State Defense Force, is the official state defense force of Oregon and one of the three components of Oregon State's organized militia, with Oregon's Army and Air National Guard (ORNG) making up the other two. It serves as a state-level military and emergency services reserve force.

As part of the official state militia, the Oregon Civil Defense Force serves under the Governor of Oregon rather than the President of the United States and draws its legal authority from Chapter 399 of Oregon law. Those statutes require that the ORCDF be made up of individuals that are not a part of the federal military services or the National Guard. It is an all volunteer force composed and is a branch of the Oregon Military Department.

In April 2015, the Oregon Military Department temporarily suspended the Oregon State Defense Force. However, a spokesman for the Oregon Military Department stated on record that the suspension was temporary and the ORSDF would return to active service. In 2017, the Oregon State Defense Force was renamed under Oregon state law as the Oregon Civil Defense Force. In December 2019, the ORSDF was reactivated under its current name: the Oregon Civil Defense Force.

== History ==
=== Civil War ===
The Oregon Civil Defense Force traces its root to the state military forces first created during the American Civil War. Although Oregon militia units did not directly serve in the Civil War, they were called up to replace the federal soldiers who were called away from protecting the frontier and redeployed to fight against the Confederate Army. In 1866, the state militia was disbanded as federal soldiers were once again deployed in the Oregon territory. However, almost immediately after their disbanding, they were re-formed after legislation was introduced by State Representative Colonel Owen Summers.

=== Spanish–American War ===
During the Spanish–American War, Oregon provided the 2nd Oregon Volunteer Infantry Regiment to serve in the Philippines. They were among the first United States forces to enter the Pacific theater of the war, and served with distinction. The 2nd Oregon Volunteer Regiment was the first unit to land in the Philippines, and the first to enter the capital of Manila.

=== World Wars I and II ===
During both World Wars, when the National Guard was deployed abroad, states were forced to organize their own military units if they wished to protect their borders and infrastructure from sabotage or attack. In World War I, a Home Guard was mustered to protect shipyards. Oregon's World War I-era home guard, the Oregon Guard, included an intelligence department created with the express purpose of finding spies, deserters, and draft-dodgers.

During World War II, a Home Guard was once again created in order to guard National Guard bases and protect against sabotage. After both wars, the organizations were deactivated.

=== Modern times ===
The Oregon National Guard Reserve was formed in 1961, and was renamed the Oregon State Defense Force (ORSDF) in 1989. In 1996, the ORSDF was activated to assist in recovery operations after severe snowstorms struck Oregon. In 2002, the Oregon State Defense Force was reorganized to better parallel their National Guard counterparts. In April 2015, the Oregon Defense Force was placed under temporary suspension. Spokesmen from the Oregon National Guard promised that the ORSDF would be returning. The ORSDF was reactivated under its current name, the Oregon Civil Defense Force, in December 2019.

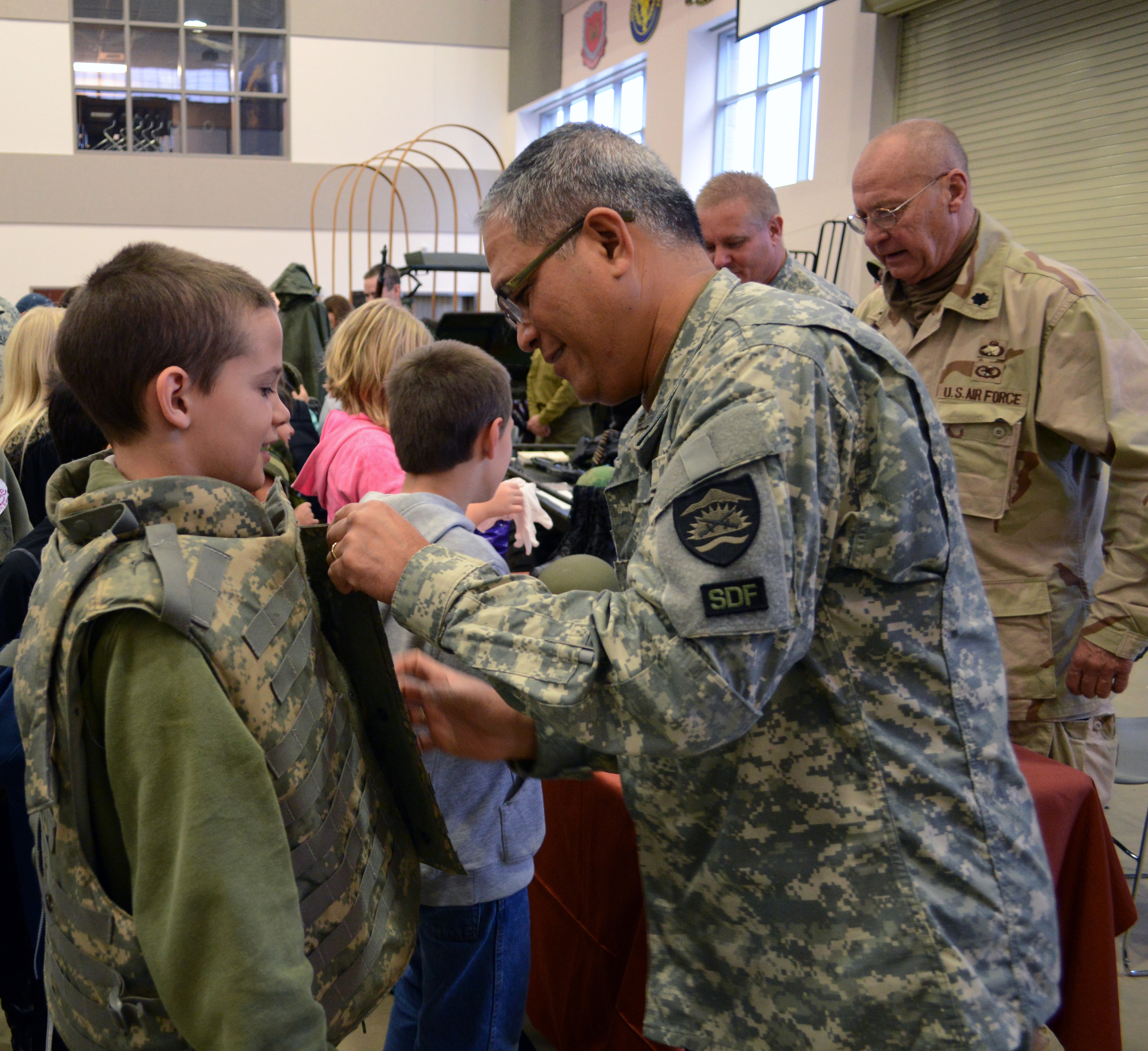
Staff Sgt. (ORSDF) Pedro Toledo (right), with the Oregon State Defense Force, helps a child try on body armor soldiers typically wear for training and deployments.

== Membership ==
Membership in the Oregon State Defense Force is open to able-bodied residents of the state between the ages of 18 and 45. State employees of the Oregon Military Department who are not otherwise members of the Oregon National Guard may be required to join the Oregon State Defense Force as a condition of employment.

== Duties ==
By statute the Oregon State Defense Force is an internal security force for the Oregon State National Guard and can be called upon by the Governor of Oregon to serve under many capacities.

- provide assistance to the Oregon National Guard in an emergency
- maintain ham radio communication during an emergency
- augment National Guard state active duty missions
- participate in local training exercises with other first responders
- fulfill the state duties of the National Guard when the National Guard is federalized.

The ORCDF assists, augments or replaces the National Guard as ordered by the Governor (e.g., during times of crisis or when the ORNG is deployed elsewhere). During emergency or disaster incidents, the ORCDF assists requesting civil or military authorities with rapidly deployable emergency communications, coordination, and incident command system expertise and support compliant with Federal Emergency Management Agency (FEMA) rules.

After the reactivation of the ORCDF in 2019, the primary mission assigned to the ORCDF became the support of high frequency communications at National Guard armories, with future additional missions to be determined in conjunction with the National Guard.

== Units ==
The units of the Oregon Civil Defense Force are organized as follows:

- Headquarters, 41st Regiment (Tigard)
- 218th Battalion (Forest Grove)
- 162nd Battalion (Springfield)
- 186th Battalion (Medford)
- Special Troops Detachment (Clackamas)
- Headquarters, 82nd Regiment (Clackamas)
- Headquarters, 249th Regiment (Warrenton)
- 1249th Battalion (Salem)
- 116th Battalion (La Grande)
- 1-82 Battalion (Bend)

=== ORSDF Pipe Band ===
The Oregon State Defense Force maintained a military band, which was composed of bagpipe and drum players. The unit was invited to play in Ronald Reagan's inauguration in 1981, and continued to play in military ceremonies and parades in Oregon. The ORSDF Pipeband became disassociated from the Oregon Military Department with the standing down of the ORSDF in 2015.

== Legal protection ==
=== Protection against dissolution ===
Oregon law requires the state to maintain the ORSDF at a cadre level during peacetime.

=== Employment protection ===
Employers within the state of Oregon are required under Oregon law to grant a leave of absence to any of their employees who are members of the Oregon State Defense Force, and who are activated to take part in training or to respond to an emergency situation. Employers must then reinstate these employees to their previous position, without loss of seniority, accrued vacation time, personal time, sick leave, or other benefits when their deployment ends.

== See also ==
- Awards and decorations of the State Defense Forces
- Oregon Naval Militia
- Oregon Wing Civil Air Patrol
