= Beuzeville Airfield =

Abandoned World War II military airfield in Normandy

Beuzeville/Ste Mère Eglise Airfield Advanced Landing Ground (ALG) A-6
- Manche, Basse-Normandie Region, France
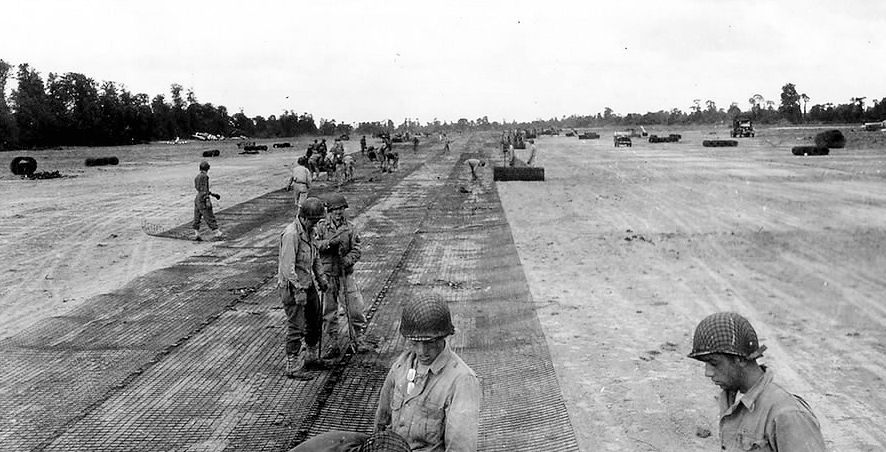
- 810th Engineering Aviation Brigade constructing Beuzeville/Ste Mère Eglise (A-6), France

Site information
- Type: Military Airfield
- Controlled by: United States Army Air Forces

Location
- Coordinates: 49°25′22″N 01°17′39″W

Site history
- Built by: IX Engineering Command
- In use: June–September 1944
- Materials: Square-Mesh Track (SMT)
- Battles/wars: World War II – EAME Theater: Normandy Campaign; Northern France Campaign

Garrison information
- Garrison: Ninth Air Force
- Occupants: 371st Fighter Group; 367th Fighter Group

Airfield information
Runways
| Direction | Length and surface |
|---|---|
| 06/24 | 5,000 feet (1,520 m) SMT/PSP |
- One runway, 4 alert pads, 50 hardstands

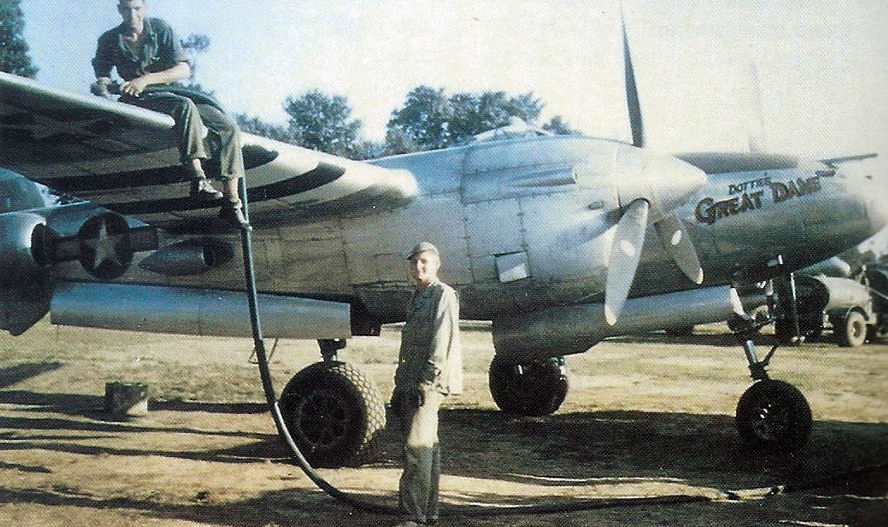
367th Fighter Group – 394th FS P-38 Lightning "Dotties Great Lady" at Beuzeville Airfield (A-6), France

Beuzeville/Ste Mère Eglise (Beuzeville) Airfield is an abandoned World War II military airfield, which is located near the commune of Beuzeville-au-Plain in the Normandy region of northern France.

Located just outside Beuzeville-au-Plain, the United States Army Air Force established a temporary airfield shortly after D-Day on 7 June 1944, shortly after the Allied landings in France The airfield was one of the first established in the liberated area of Normandy, being constructed by the IX Engineering Command, 819th Engineer Aviation Battalion.

== History ==
Known as Advanced Landing Ground "A-6", the airfield consisted of a single 5000' (1500m) Square-Mesh Track runway aligned 05/23. In addition, tents were used for billeting and also for support facilities. An access road was built to the existing road infrastructure, and a dump for supplies, ammunition, and gasoline drums, along with a drinkable water and minimal electrical grid for communications and station lighting.

Construction of the airfield began on the morning of 8 June, when an advanced element stronger than fifty men began work at about 10:00 a.m. After a day of hard work almost in the heart of the fighting during which the battalion lost seven men, the runway was almost ready. The presence of snipers and enemy aircraft at night prohibited night work. First the land was put to the standard R & R (refueling and rearming). In this configuration, it ended 14 June. Nevertheless, from 10 June, three spitfires from a Polish squadron of the 2nd Tactical Air Force British had already landed. The first American plane landed there on 11. The same day, five Waco gliders filled with ammunition and reinforcements to the 82nd Airborne also were there. The next day an air drop of more than 20 tons of ammunition occurred above the airfield. The rest of the battalion joined the media company on 11 and 12 June.

It was declared operational on 14 June, eight days after D-Day, and served as the first airfield on the beachhead. The fighter planes flew support missions during the Allied invasion of Normandy, patrolling roads in front of the beachhead, strafing German military vehicles and dropping bombs on gun emplacements, anti-aircraft artillery and concentrations of German troops in Normandy and Brittany when spotted.

After the Americans moved east into Central France with the advancing Allied Armies, the airfield was left un-garrisoned and used for resupply and casualty evacuation. It was closed on 18 September 1944 and the land returned to agricultural use.

== Major units assigned ==
- 371st Fighter Group 15 June – 18 September 1944

404th (9Q), 405th (8N), 406th (4w) Fighter Squadrons (P-47D)

- 367th Fighter Group 22 July – 14 August 1944

392d (H5), 393d (8L), 394th (4N) Fighter Squadrons (P-38)

== Current use ==
Today the airfield is a mixture of various agricultural fields. A memorial to the men and units that were stationed at Beuzeville was placed at the site of the former airfield. It is located near La Londe, bordering the D17 towards Beuzeville-au-Plain.

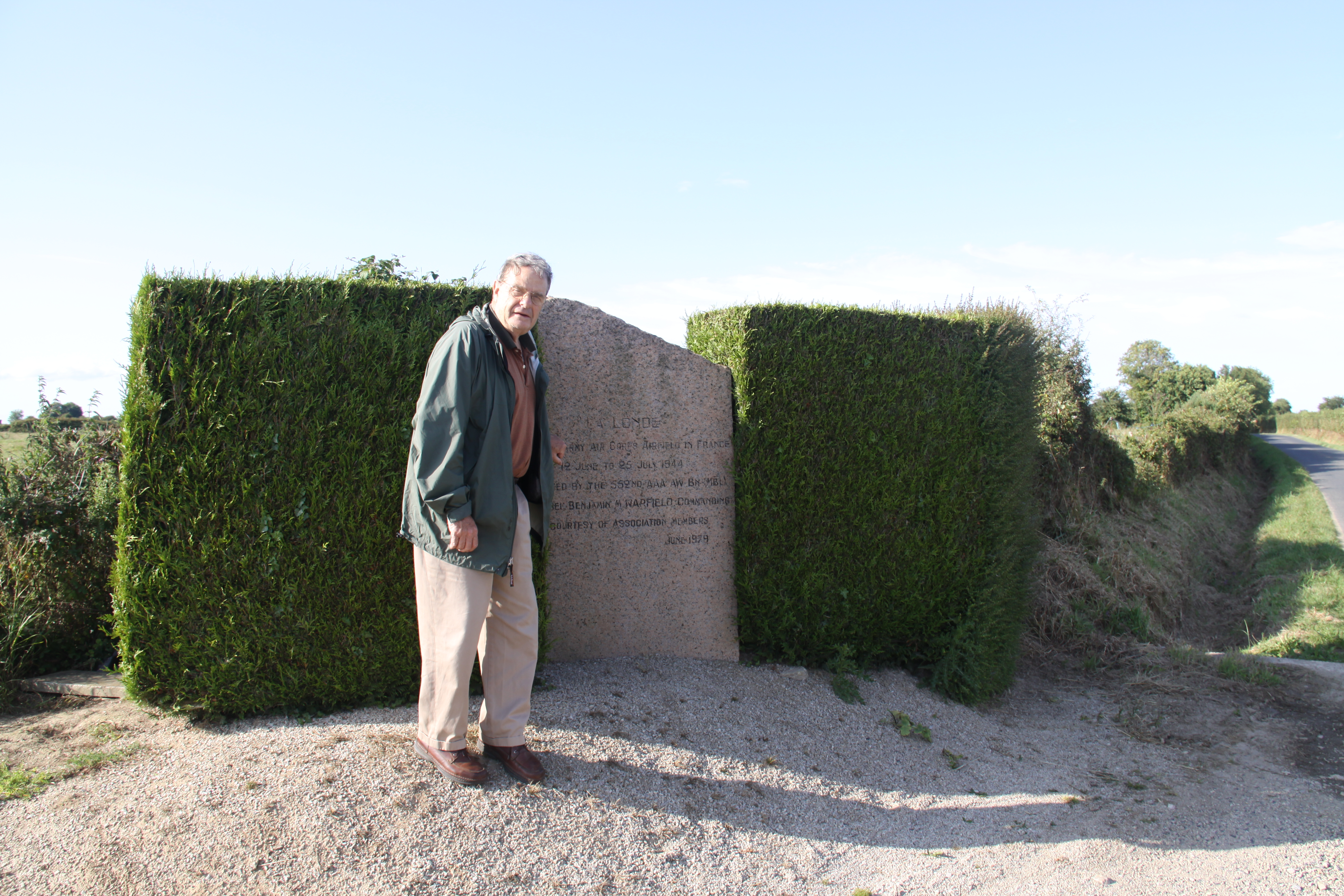
La Londe airfield memorial plaque in outside Ste.-Mere-Eglise

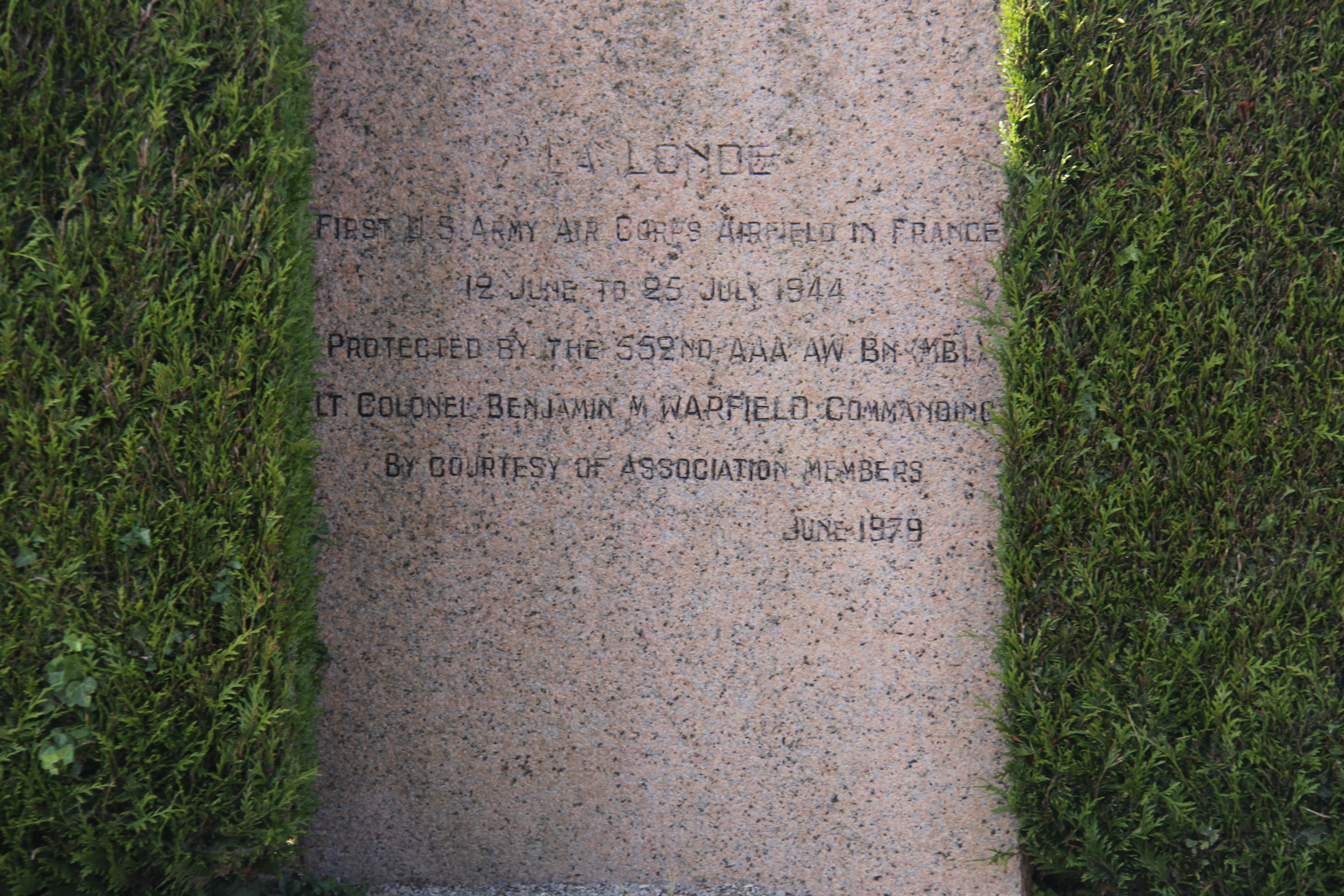
Close up of La Londe airfield memorial plaque in outside Ste.-Mere-Eglise

== See also ==
- Advanced Landing Ground
