= Exercise Iron Falcon =

Exercise Iron Falcon are military aerial training exercises at United Arab Emirates Air Warfare Center. Various squadrons from various United States Air Force (USAF) bases and coalition forces participated in these exercises at various times.

== 2004 Exercises ==
USAF leaders from Shaw Air Force Base, South Carolina participated in a special Special planning as an upgrade training for mission commanders was established. This training was specific for all members of the Gulf Cooperation Council to eventually participate in the primary exercise. The primary exercise training was developed during operations Northern Watch and Southern Watch. The 77th Fighter Squadron with their F-16 Fighting Falcons participated in the second part of this exercise.

== 2009 Exercises ==
In 2009, the F-22 Raptor made its first appearance in the Middle East at the United Arab Emirates Air Warfare Center from November until December 10. Six Raptors and their support unit from the 1st Fighter Wing at Langley Air Force Base, Virginia performed bilateral training their coalitions partners.

== See also ==
- MAPLE FLAG
- TOPGUN
- Opposing force
