= Oregon Wing Civil Air Patrol =

- Oregon Wing of Civil Air Patrol

Associated branches
- United States Air Force

Command staff
- Commander: Col Scott Maguire
- Deputy Commander: Maj Mike Wissing
- Chief of Staff: Capt Bart Bradish
- Deputy Chief of Staff: Col Virginia Thompson

Current statistics
- Cadets: 199
- Seniors: 270
- Total Membership: 469
- Website: orwg.cap.gov
- Statistics as of December 2020

The Oregon Wing is one of six wings that comprise the Pacific Region and one of 52 wings in the Civil Air Patrol. It serves as the headquarters for Civil Air Patrol units in the state of Oregon. Oregon Wing headquarters is located in Eugene, Oregon. The wing itself oversees nearly 500 cadet and adult members serving with 13 squadrons or flights across the state of Oregon.

== Mission ==
The Oregon Wing performs the three missions of the Civil Air Patrol: Emergency Services; a cadet program to build future leaders from American youth; and providing Aerospace Education for both CAP members and the general public.

=== Emergency services ===
The Civil Air Patrol provides emergency services mission support to local, state and federal agencies. These mission support activities include performing support for search and rescue activities, homeland security and disaster relief, assisting in humanitarian aid assignments during times of crisis, and aerial photography. CAP provides support to the Air Force by conducting light transport, communications support, low-altitude route surveys, and by conducting other support missions.

=== Cadet programs ===
The Civil Air Patrol offers a cadet program for youth aged 12 to 21, which includes providing cadets with aerospace education, leadership training, physical fitness and character development training. Cadets achieve ranks and milestones through a structured training program. They wear the Air Force style uniform, learn military style drill and ceremonies, provide color and honor guard support, and learn how to become effective leaders. Additionally, the national CAP cadet program provides unique training opportunities across the country. Inside of Oregon, they host the yearly Winter Raptor Encampment which is renowned among cadets across the nation for its professionalism and skill level.

=== Aerospace education ===
The Civil Air Patrol teaches aerospace education to CAP members and the general public. The aerospace education mission is accomplished through providing training to the members of CAP through the cadet program, and offering workshops for youth throughout the nation through schools and public aviation events. The organization also provides STEM kits to units, aerospace educators and school teachers at no cost to advance this initiative.

== Organization ==
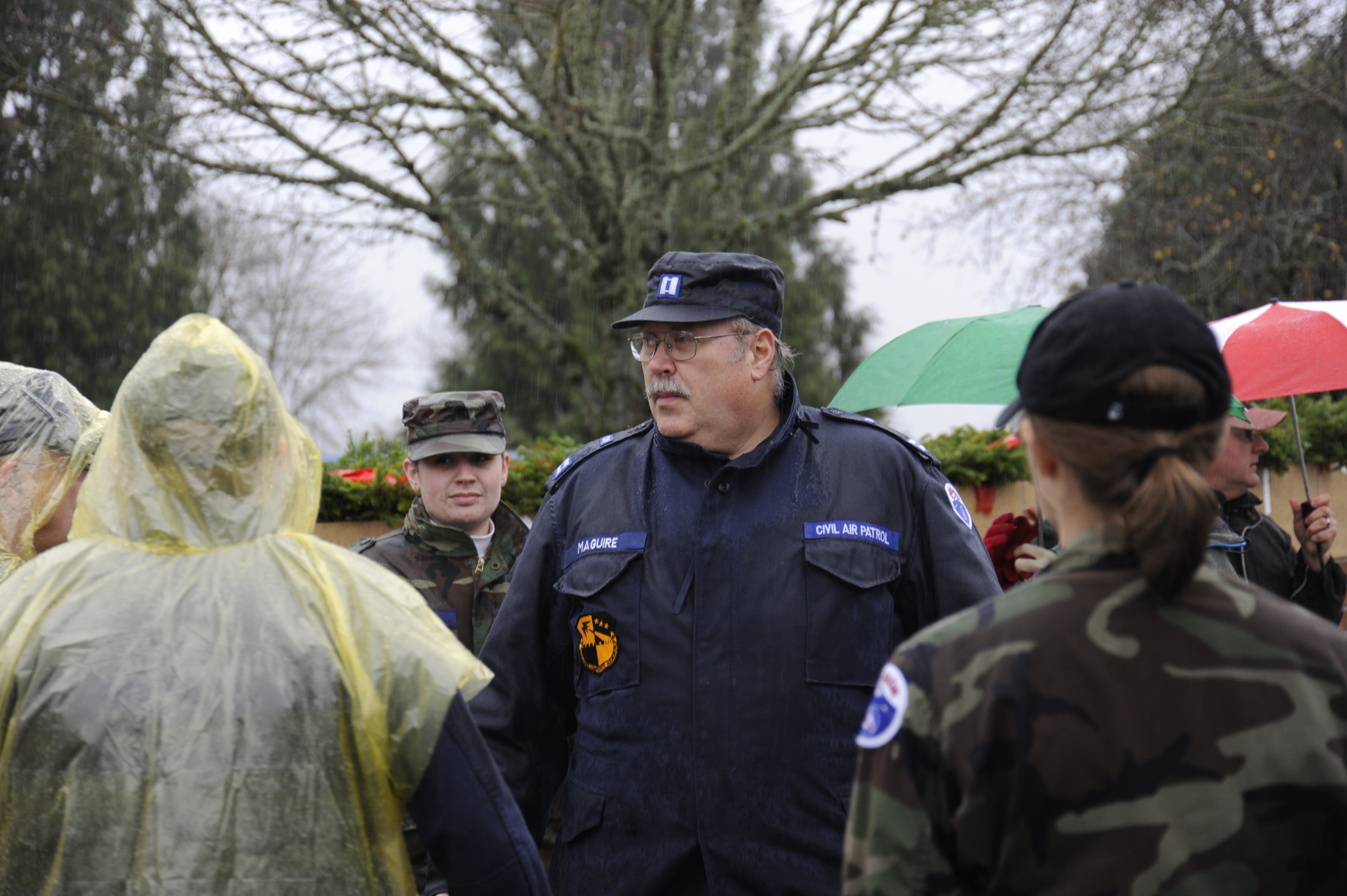
Members of the Civil Air Patrol receive a briefing prior to placing wreaths on graves in the Willamette National Cemetery, Portland, Oregon.

Squadrons of the Oregon Wing
Designation	Squadron Name	Location	Notes
OR-007	Medford Composite Squadron	Medford	
OR-008	Gorge Composite Squadron	Hood River	
OR-034	Washington County Composite Squadron	Hillsboro	
OR-037	Grants Pass Composite Squadron	Merlin	
OR-042	Salem Composite Squadron	Salem	
OR-050	High Desert Composite Squadron	Bend	
OR-055	Eugene Composite Squadron	Eugene	
OR-065	Aurora Composite Squadron	Aurora	
OR-073	Columbia Composite Squadron	Portland	
OR-099	McMinnville Composite Flight	McMinnville	
OR-114	Tillamook County Composite Squadron	Tillamook	

== See also ==
- Awards and decorations of the Civil Air Patrol
- Oregon Civil Defense Force
