= Air Support =

1992 video game

- Amiga cover art
- Developer: Psygnosis
- Publisher: Psygnosis
- Platforms: Amiga, Atari ST
- Release: 1992
- Genre: Turn-based strategy
- Mode: Single player

Air Support is a 1992 game for the Amiga and Atari ST. It is a top-down strategy game, with a first-person mode available for special missions. The game takes place during a retro-futuristic 21st century where all wars are fought in virtual reality.
