= 142nd Wing =

142nd Wing

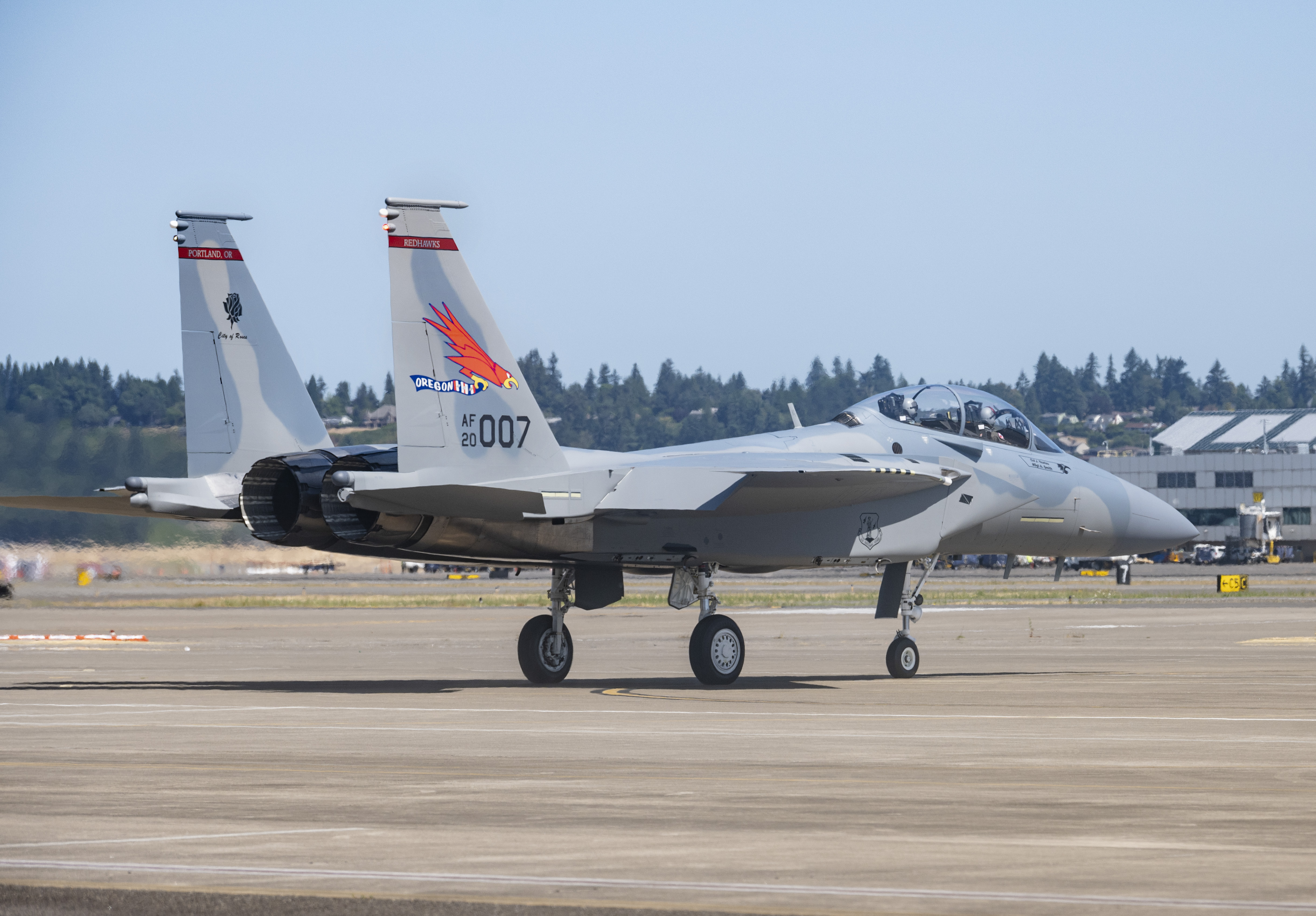
- A 142nd Wing F-15EX Eagle II at Portland Air National Guard Base 12 July 2024
- Active: 1950–1952; 1952–present
- Country: United States
- Branch: Air National Guard
- Type: Wing
- Role: Fighter/Air Defense/Special Tactics
- Part of: Oregon Air National Guard
- Garrison/HQ: Portland Air National Guard Base, Portland, Oregon
- Nickname: Redhawks
- Motto: Semper Vigilans (Latin for 'Always Ready')
- Decorations: Air Force Outstanding Unit Award
- Website: www.142wg.ang.af.mil

Commanders
- Current commander: Colonel David J. Christensen

Insignia
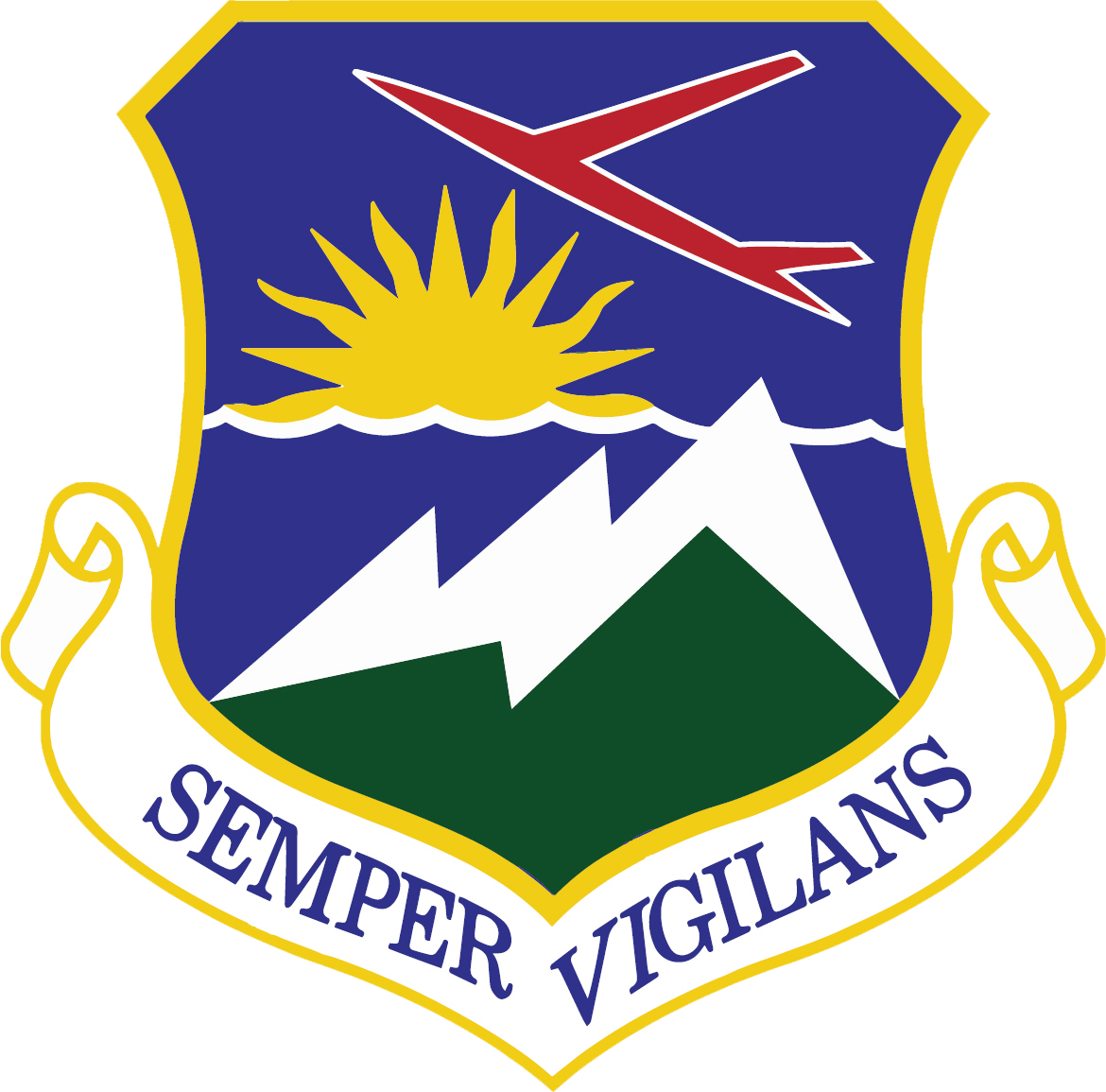
- 142nd Wing emblem

- 142nd Fighter Wing emblem

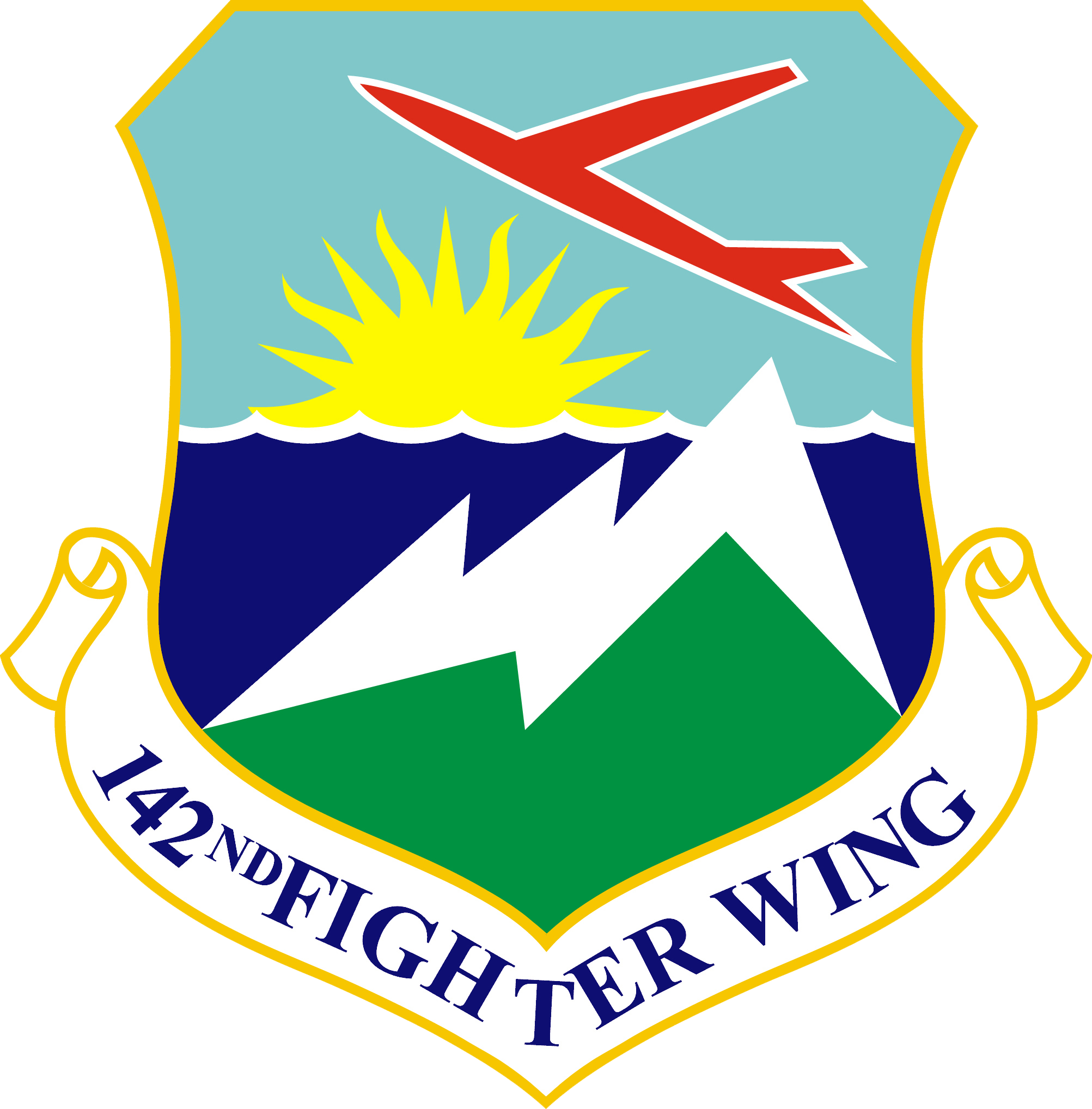
- 142nd Fighter Wing emblem

The 142nd Wing is a unit of the Oregon Air National Guard and the United States Air Force, stationed at Portland Air National Guard Base, Oregon. When activated for federal service, the wing falls under control of Air Combat Command.

The 123rd Fighter Squadron assigned to the wing's 142nd Operations Group, descends from the 123rd Observation Squadron, formed on 30 July 1940. It is one of the 29 original National Guard Observation Squadrons of the United States Army National Guard formed before World War II. The 123rd FS acts as a part of First Air Force and the Western Air Defense Sector, providing air sovereignty and homeland defense of the Western United States for NORAD on a 24/7 basis.

The 125th Special Tactics Squadron (STS), which conducts a wide array of special forces operations both domestically, and internationally, is also part of the wing. According to the 125th STS mission statement, the squadron is "poised for full spectrum rapid response to all crises and contingencies at home or abroad". The 125th STS is one of only two Special Tactics Units in the Air National Guard. The inclusion of the 125th STS under the Wing led to the organization re-designating itself as the 142nd Wing in order to better articulate the varied capabilities of the organization.

== Units ==
To carry out these missions, four groups are assigned to the 142nd Fighter Wing:

- 142nd Operations Group
  - 116th Air Control Squadron, Camp Rilea AFTC, Warrenton
  - 142nd Security Forces Squadron
  - 123rd Fighter Squadron
  - 125th Special Tactics Squadron
  - 123rd Weather Flight
- 142nd Maintenance Group
- 142nd Mission Support Group
- 142nd Medical Group

Portland Air National Guard Base in Portland, Oregon, is host to several tenant units as well as the Air Force Reserve 304th Rescue Squadron.

== History ==
=== World War II ===
Formed at Westover Field, Massachusetts in August 1943, the 371st Fighter Group trained in the mid-Atlantic area, and moved to the European theater during February and March 1944, serving in combat with 9th Air Force from April 1944 to May 1945.

During this time, the 371st Fighter Group began operations, using P-47 fighter aircraft over France. This involved dive-bombing, and escort missions prior to the invasion of Europe. Additionally, the 371st attacked railroads, trains, vehicles, gun emplacements, and buildings in France during the invasion on June 6, 1944. The Fighter Group also patrolled beachhead areas and continued its assaults against the enemy during the remainder of the Normandy campaign. This included participation in the aerial barrage that prepared the way for the Allied breakthrough at St. Lo on July 25, and supported the subsequent drive across northern France.

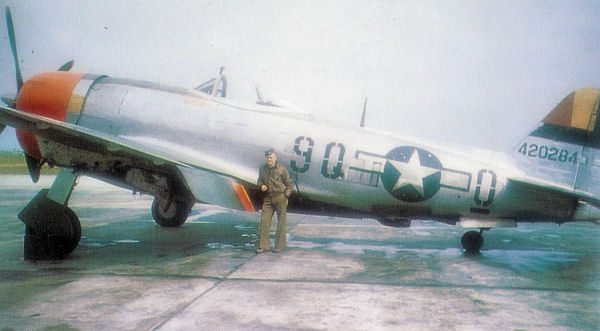
Republic P-47D-28-RE Thunderbolt, AAF Ser. No. 44-200284, of the 404th Fighter Squadron (photo taken at Fürth/Industrieflughafen, Germany.)

Operated in the area of northeastern France and southwestern Germany during the fall and winter of 1944–1945, attacking such targets as storage dumps, trains, rail lines, marshalling yards, buildings, factories, bridges, roads, vehicles, and strong points. Conducted operations that supported Allied ground action in the Battle of the Bulge, December 1944–January 1945. Launched a series of attacks against vehicles, factories, buildings, railroad cars, tanks, and gun emplacements during the period 15–21 March 1945, being awarded a Distinguished Unit Citation for this six-day action that contributed to the defeat of the enemy in southern Germany.

Continued operations until May 1945. Returned to the US, October and November 1945, and inactivated.

=== Oregon Air National Guard ===
The wartime 371st Fighter Group was re-activated and re-designated as the 142nd Fighter Group, and was allotted to the Oregon Air National Guard, on 24 May 1946. It was organized at Portland Municipal Airport, Oregon, and was extended federal recognition on 30 August 1946 by the National Guard Bureau. The 142nd Fighter Group was bestowed the history, honors, and colors of the 371st Fighter Group. The group's 123rd Fighter Squadron was equipped with P-51D Mustangs and was assigned to the Fourth Air Force, Air Defense Command.

=== Korean War activation ===
The group was federalized and brought to active duty on March 2, 1951. It was assigned to the Air Defense Command Western Air Defense Force. Afterwards, it was then reassigned to the federalized Washington Air National Guard's 142nd Fighter-Interceptor Wing in April 1951, and moved to O'Hare International Airport, Chicago, Illinois, by May of the same year. The organization was then re-designated as the 142nd Fighter-Interceptor Group on May 1, 1951. At O'Hare International Airport, the 142nd Fighter Group controlled the 62nd Fighter-Interceptor Squadron flying F-86A Sabre interceptors.

The group was inactivated on 6 February 1952, being replaced by the 4706th Air Defense Wing.

=== Cold War ===
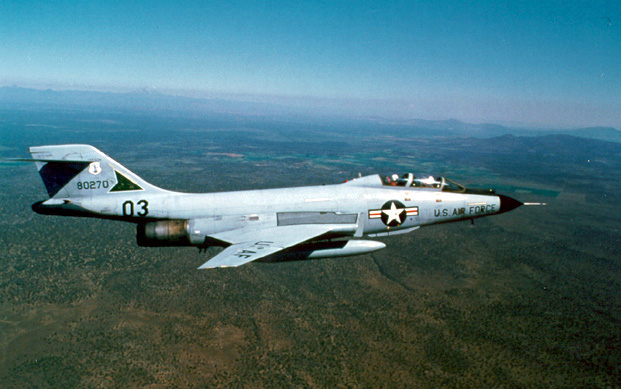
A two-seat McDonnell F-101B Voodoo

Resuming its peacetime mission of the air defense of Oregon, Air Defense Command (ADC) upgraded the groups capabilities by allocating the F-94A Starfire all-weather interceptor. With this new aircraft, the mission of the 123rd Fighter-Interceptor Squadron changed from day interceptor to day and night all-weather interceptor. In 1957 the 123rd again upgraded to the improved F-89J Scorpion, and again upgraded to the supersonic F-102A Delta Dagger in 1966. In the summer of 1958, the 142nd implemented the ADC Runway Alert Program, in which interceptors of the 123rd Fighter-Interceptor Squadron were committed to a five-minute runway alert 24/7. The runway alert continues to this day.

In 1972 it received the Mach-2 F-101B Voodoo. As an example of the unit's readiness and capability, in 1976, the unit won top honors at a pair of Aerospace Defense Command (ADC) competitions, the Weapons Loading Competition and the famous William Tell Air Defense Competition. In William Tell 1976, the 142nd garnered first place in the F-101 category and Lieutenant Colonel Don Tonole and Major Brad Newell captured the overall "Top Gun" title flying the McDonnell F-101B Voodoo.

After the inactivation of Aerospace Defense Command in 1979 and the reassignment to Tactical Air Command (ADTAC), the 123rd began receiving F-4C Phantom II aircraft used in the interceptor mission beginning in 1981. Success came again at William Tell 1984 when the unit placed first in the F-4 category flying the McDonnell-Douglas F-4C Phantom II and beat many of its F-15 Eagle and F-106 Delta Dart rivals in the overall competition. Majors Ron Moore and Bill De Jager were the overall F-4 "Top Guns" of the competition.

C-130A #56-531 BEAVER 41 overflying Mount Hood, Oregon 1986

Beginning in 1986, The OreANG's 142nd Fighter-Interceptor Group (FIG) was the first ever ANG fighter group to receive the Lockheed C-130A Hercules as an operational support aircraft, providing movements of high-priority passengers and cargo with time, place, or mission-sensitive requirements. All were a vital capability given the 24/7 air defense alert responsibility of the 142nd FIG at the height of the Cold War. C-130A-9-LM tail #56-0531 was permanently assigned to the 142nd FIG, call sign BEAVER 41 and flew throughout the U.S. and Alaska, covering a total of 20 states. #531 was the sole C-130 in the USAF inventory painted in gloss aircraft gray, and adorned with the unit "Redhawks" livery on its tail. The end of the OreANG C-130 program came on Feb. 6, 1990, when #531 was formally transferred to the U.S. Forest Service, continuing to serve as a aerial firefighting tanker for the western states.

OreANG 142nd FIG C-130A #56-531 departing Marine Corps Air Station Miramar 1988

In 1985, as part of the retirement of the F-4C from the inventory, the Oregon Air National Guard began to receive F-15A Eagles from active-duty units receiving the upgraded F-15C. Since the end of the Cold War, the 142nd has served as the principal air defense unit of the Pacific Northwest. In 1992, as part of a large USAF reorganization, both the group and squadron were re-designated yet again as the 142nd Fighter Group and the 123rd Fighter Squadron, respectively. In 1995 the group was elevated to wing status, beginning its current designation as the 142nd Fighter Wing.

The wing participated in a wide variety of expeditionary and humanitarian assistance missions in the turbulent post-Cold War environment while providing air defense of the Pacific Northwest. These included major deployments to Turkey in 1998 for Operation Northern Watch and to Saudi Arabia in 2000 for Operation Southern Watch. The wing deployed aircraft to Panama in 1998 in support of counter-drug missions, helping stem the flow of the drug trade by air. Wing personnel deployed on various other missions, sending medical troops to Belize, civil engineers to Macedonia, and to such places around the globe as Curaçao, Denmark, Germany, Guam, Kuwait, Spain and the United Kingdom.

=== Twenty-first century ===
On September 11, 2001, the wing was one of the first units to respond to the 9/11 terrorist attacks on the East Coast of the United States with increased air defense to enhance security on the west coast. This led into participation in Operation Noble Eagle.

In the 50th Year of William Tell Anniversary Competition held in 2004, the 142nd Fighter Wing was rated first in maintenance, element attack and gun categories.

In 2004, unit personnel provided humanitarian aid in the wake of Hurricanes Katrina and Rita and the 2007 floods in Vernonia, Oregon. The wing also supported ongoing contingency operations in Southwest Asia, including Operation Iraqi Freedom and Operation Enduring Freedom, such as in the 2004 deployment of medical personnel to Qatar and the 2009 deployment of Security Forces Squadron personnel to Iraq.

In 2005, the early 1970s F-15A model were retired and the squadron received its current aircraft, the F-15C Eagle.

The base was selected by the 2005 Base Realignment and Closure Commission (2005 BRAC) to close. Eleventh-hour negotiations between the political delegations from the states of Washington and Oregon saved the base from closure. Ironically the argument made by several groups to save the base was that of the NORAD mission it performed and the air cover it provided for the Pacific Northwest was essential to homeland security. However, the 2005 BRAC commission recommended keeping a small detachment in place at the base in order to support NORAD but close all other operations. As part of the recommendations of the 2005 BRAC, the Air Force Reserve Command's 939th Air Refueling Wing which was also located on the Portland Air National Guard Station was forced to terminate operations.

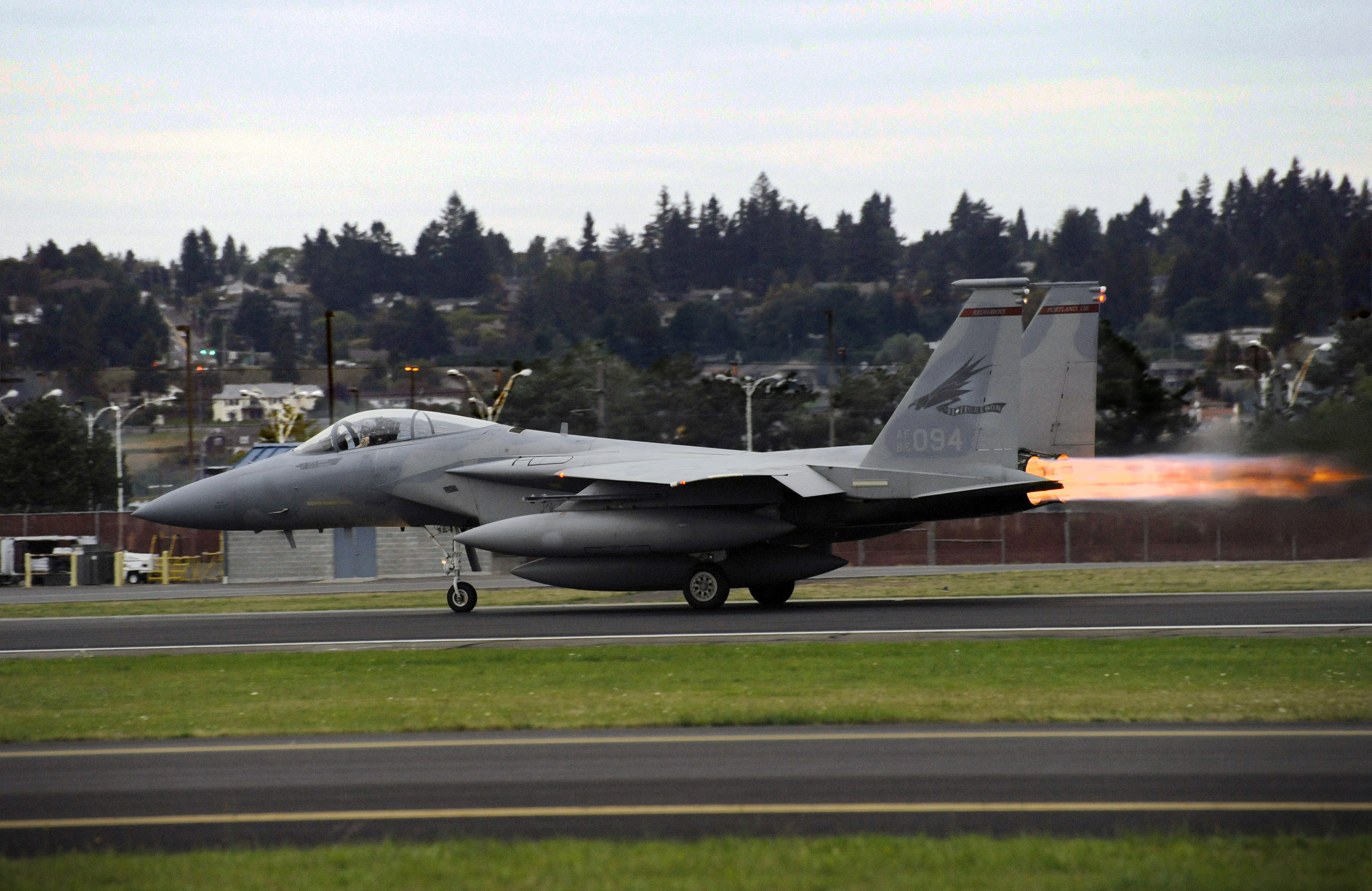
An Oregon Air National Guard F-15C Eagle takes off from the Portland Air National Guard Base Oct. 2, 2010

On June 26, 2007, an F-15 Eagle from the 142nd Fighter Wing crashed into the Pacific Ocean during a simulated dogfight. Two F-15s from the 142nd were flying with two F/A-18 Hornets from Naval Air Station Fort Worth Joint Reserve Base performing dissimilar air combat training. The United States Coast Guard performed a search using two HH-60 Jayhawks, two Coast Guard Cutters, and one HC-130 Hercules. The night of the crash, the pilot, Major Gregory Young's body was found 40 miles west of Cannon Beach, Oregon. The crash was due to unrecognized spatial disorientation, which caused the pilot to misperceive his attitude and airspeed until his aircraft impacted the water.

In August 2010, two F-15 Eagles from the 142nd Fighter Wing were dispatched to Seattle, Washington, during a visit by President Barack Obama. The aircraft were scrambled due to a civilian aircraft violating protected airspace established for the President's visit. The jets produced two sonic booms over the Seattle skyline, the civilian Cessna 182 left restricted airspace before the jets arrived.

On August 10, 2018, two F-15C's from the 142nd, both originally Massachusetts Air National Guard fighters on a "swap" to the Oregon Air National Guard, intercepted a stolen Horizon Air Bombardier Q400 turboprop over Seattle. The fighters armed with live AIM-9 Sidewinder and AIM-120 AMRAAM missiles, intercepted and escorted the plane away from populated areas before it crashed on Ketron Island, near McChord Air Force Base.

In June 2019, the 142nd Fighter Wing celebrated 30 years of flying the F-15 aircraft. Due in part to the wing's long familiarity with the aircraft, it was selected as one of the first operational wings to receive the Boeing F-15EX Eagle II fighter aircraft. F-15EX aircraft were expected to arrive sometime in 2024 or 2025. On June 6, 2024, first F-15EX for 142nd Wing arrived in Oregon.

=== 2020s ===
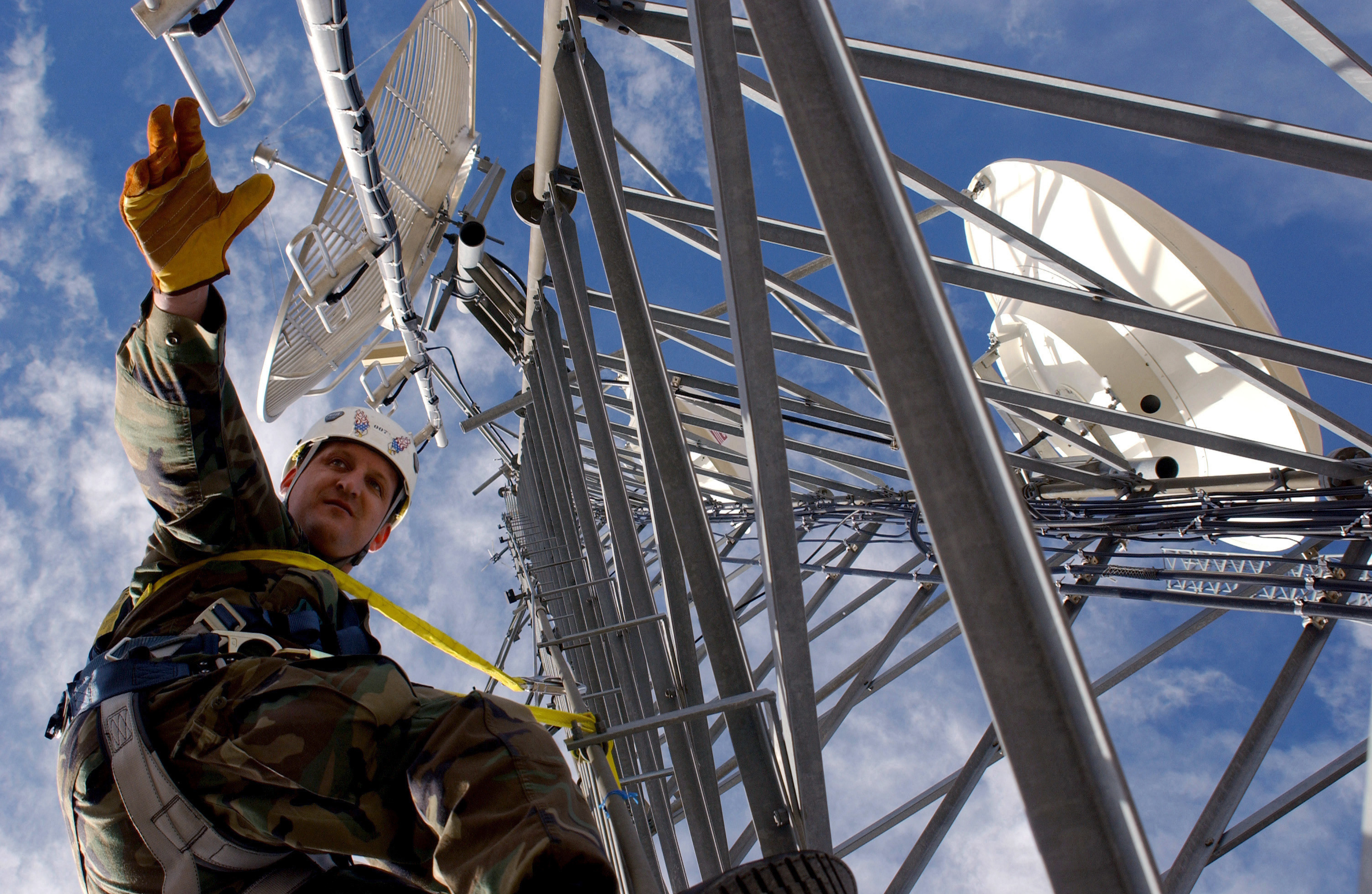
Technician from 142nd Fighter Wing working on a communications tower

The unit was redesignated as the 142nd Wing as of 6 March 2020, following the addition of the 125th Special Tactics Squadron.

In February 2021 in response to the COVID-19 pandemic, Governor Kate Brown activated the Oregon National Guard to help administer the COVID-19 vaccine to the public. As part of this effort, members of the 142nd Medical Group worked to administer the vaccine at the Oregon Convention Center mass vaccination site.

Today the 142nd Wing supports drug interdiction, United States Air Forces in Europe (USAFE) air defense, as well as contingency operations such as Operation Noble Eagle. The wing provides mission-ready units, personnel, and equipment for:

- Air defense of the Pacific Northwest, guarding the skies from northern California to the Canada–US border, on 24-hour alert as part of North American Air Defense Command
- air superiority missions
- Federal augmentation in support of Department of Defense objectives
- Response to state and local contingencies
- Domestic search and rescue operations
- Proactive involvement in activities that add value to the people and communities which it serves

Today the wing flies the McDonnell Douglas F-15 Eagle (C and D models), providing air defense and air superiority capabilities. It has more than 1,000 officers and enlisted ranks personnel.

== Lineage ==
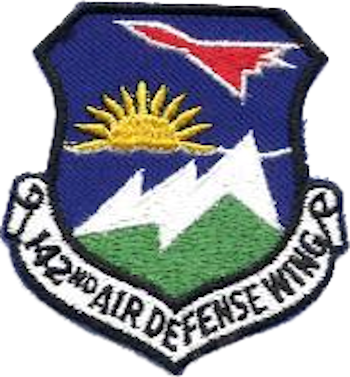
Legacy 142nd Air Defense Wing Emblem

- Constituted as 371st Fighter Group on 25 May 1943

Activated on 15 July 1943
Inactivated on 10 November 1945

- Redesignated 142nd Fighter Group. Allotted to Oregon ANG on 24 May 1946

Extended federal recognition on 30 August 1946

- Established as 142nd Fighter Wing, extended federal recognition and activated on 1 November 1950

142nd Fighter Group assigned as subordinate unit

Federalized and placed on active duty, 2 March 1951
Redesignated 142nd Fighter-Interceptor Wing on 2 March 1951
Inactivated on 6 February 1952

- Returned to Oregon state control and activated on 1 November 1952

Redesignated 142nd Air Defense Wing on 16 April 1956

Group re-designated as 142nd Fighter Group (Air Defense)

Redesignated 142nd Fighter-Interceptor Wing on 1 July 1960

Group re-designated as 142nd Fighter-Interceptor Group

Redesignated 142nd Fighter Wing on 16 March 1992

Group re-designated as 142nd Operations Group

Redesignated 142nd Wing on 6 March 2020

=== Assignments ===
- I Fighter Command, 15 July 1943

Attached to: Philadelphia Fighter Wing, 30 September 1943 – 14 February 1944

- IX Fighter Command, April 1944
- 100th Fighter Wing, 1 August 1944

Attached to: XIX Tactical Air Command, 1 August 1944

- XIX Tactical Air Command, 29 September 1944
- 1st Tactical Air Force (Provisional), 1 November 1944
- XIX Tactical Air Command, 16 February 1945 – October 1945
- Army Service Forces (for inactivation), 9–10 November 1945
- 60th Fighter Wing, 30 August 1946
- Oregon Air National Guard, 31 October 1950

Gained by: Fourth Air Force, Air Defense Command

- 142nd Fighter-Interceptor Wing (WA ANG), 2 March 1951 – 6 February 1952
- Oregon Air National Guard, 1 November 1952 – Present

Gained by: Western Air Defense Force, Air Defense Command
Gained by: Portland Air Defense Sector, Air Defense Command, 8 June 1958
Gained by: 26th Air Division, Air Defense Command, 1 April 1966
Gained by: 26th Air Division, Aerospace Defense Command, 15 January 1968
Gained by: Air Defense, Tactical Air Command (ADTAC), 1 October 1979
Gained by: First Air Force, Tactical Air Command, 9 December 1985
Gained by: Northwest Air Defense Sector (NWADS), 1 July 1987
Gained by: Western Air Defense Sector (WADS), 1 October 1997–Present

=== Components ===
==== World War II ====
- 404th Fighter Squadron (9Q): 15 July 1943 – 10 November 1945
- 405th Fighter Squadron (8N): 15 July 1943 – 10 November 1945
- 406th Fighter Squadron (4W): 15 July 1943 – 10 November 1945

==== Air National Guard ====
- 141st Fighter Group (Air Defense), 16 April 1956 – 1 July 1960
- 142nd Operations Group, 11 October 1995 – Present
- 142nd Tactical Fighter Training Group, 1 January 1983 – 15 March 1992
- 114th Fighter Squadron, 15 March 1992 – 1 April 1996 (Crater Lake–Klamath Regional Airport (Kingsley Field), Oregon)
- 116th Fighter (later Fighter-Interceptor) Squadron, 31 October 1950 – 10 February 1951; 1 November 1952 – 16 April 1956
- 123rd Fighter (Later Fighter-Interceptor, Fighter) Squadron, 30 August 1946 – Present

=== Stations ===
- Richmond Army Air Base,Virginia, 15 July 1943
- Camp Springs Army Air Field, Marylandn, 30 September 1943
- Richmond Army Air Base, Virginia, 18 January – 14 February 1944
- RAF Bisterne (AAF-415), England, March 1944
- Beuzeville Airfield (A-6), France, June 1944
- Perthes Airfield (A-65), France, 18 September 1944
- Dole/Tavaux Airfield (Y-7), France, 1 October 1944
- Tantonville Airfield (Y-1), France, 20 December 1944
- Metz Airfield (Y-34), France, 15 February 1945
- Frankfurt/Eschborn Airfield (Y-74), Germany, 7 April 1945
- Furth/Industriehafen Airfield (R-30), Germany, 5 May 1945
- AAF Station Hoersching, Austria, 16 August 1945
- Strasbourg/Entzheim Airport, France, September– October 1945
- Camp Shanks, New York, 9–10 November 1945
- Portland Municipal Airport, Oregon, 30 August 1946
- Geiger Field, Spokane Washington, 2 March 1951
- O'Hare International Airport, Chicago, Illinois, 1 May 1951 – 6 February 1952
- Portland Municipal (Later International) Airport, Oregon, 1 November 1952

Designated: Portland Air National Guard Base, Oregon, 1991–present

=== Aircraft ===
- P-47 Thunderbolt, 1943–1945
- F-51D Mustang, 1946–1952
- F-86F Sabre, 1952–1955
- F-94A Starfire, 1955–1957
- F-89J Scorpion, 1957–1966
- F-102A Delta Dagger, 1966–1971
- F-101B Voodoo, 1972–1981
- C-131B Samaritan, 1972–1986
- F-4C Phantom II, 1981–1989
- C-130A Hercules, 1986–1990
- F-15A/B Eagle, 1989–2009
- F-15C/D Eagle, 2007–Present (Planned retirement date 2025)
- F-15EX Eagle II, 2025–

=== Decorations ===
- Air Force Outstanding Unit Award
