= Sky Scorcher =

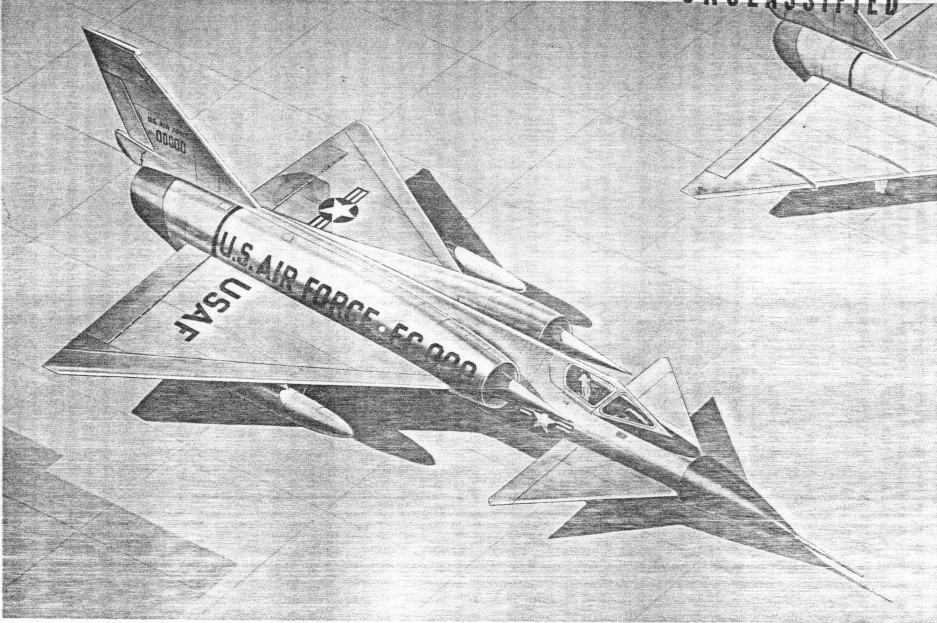
- Concept of an advanced F-106, like that which would have carried Sky Scorcher
- Type: Air-to-air missile
- Place of origin: United States

Production history
- Designed: 1956
- Manufacturer: Convair
- No. built: 0

Specifications
- Mass: 3,400 pounds (1,500 kg)
- Length: 18 feet (5.5 m)
- Diameter: 18 inches (460 mm)
- Warhead: Thermonuclear
- Blast yield: 2 megatons of TNT (8.4 PJ)
- Operational range: 140 mi (230 km)
- Maximum speed: Mach 3+

Sky Scorcher was a nuclear-armed air-to-air missile proposed to the United States Air Force in the 1950s. Intended for use as a weapon for the disruption of enemy bomber formations, it failed to find favor among Air Force planners and did not undergo development.

== Development ==
The Sky Scorcher project was proposed by the Convair Division of General Dynamics to the United States Air Force in 1956. The missile was intended to be carried by an advanced, enlarged version of Convair's F-106 Delta Dart interceptor, which had, at the time, not yet entered flight testing even in its baseline form.

Sky Scorcher was a very large missile, which was projected to be capable of carrying a thermonuclear warhead with a yield of two megatons. The oversized warhead would be used against attacking formations of supersonic bombers; it was anticipated that fourteen such initiations, at a distance of approximately 460 miles (740 km) from the bombers' target, would be sufficient to disrupt an attack. A force of eighty of the advanced fighters were proposed for carrying the weapon.

Despite Convair's sales pitch and the anticipated effectiveness of the weapon, the Air Force was unenthusiastic about the concept; aside from the expense of developing the aircraft and weapon, the Sky Scorcher missile also suffered from the fact that there would be significant effects on the ground below the location of an airburst of a multi-megaton nuclear warhead. As a result, the project was abandoned before any significant work was undertaken.
