= Lockheed C-141 Starlifter =

Retired American heavy military transport aircraft from Lockheed

C-141 Starlifter
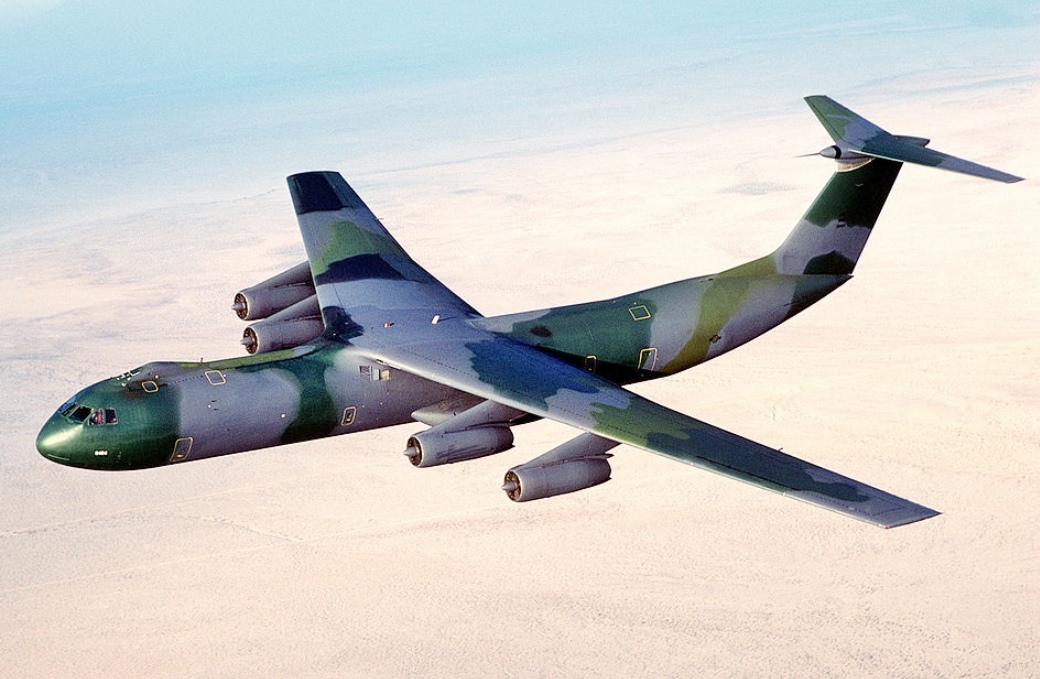
- A United States Air Force C-141B in flight

General information
- Type: Strategic airlifter
- National origin: United States
- Manufacturer: Lockheed
- Status: Retired
- Primary users: United States Air Force NASA
- Number built: 285

History
- Manufactured: 1963–1968
- Introduction date: April 1965
- First flight: December 17, 1963; 62 years ago
- Retired: May 2006
- Variant: Kuiper Airborne Observatory

The Lockheed C-141 Starlifter is a retired four-engine military strategic airlifter that served with the Military Air Transport Service (MATS), its successor organization the Military Airlift Command (MAC), and finally the Air Mobility Command (AMC) of the United States Air Force (USAF). The aircraft also served with airlift and air mobility wings of the Air Force Reserve (AFRES), later renamed Air Force Reserve Command (AFRC), the Air National Guard (ANG) and, later, one air mobility wing of the Air Education and Training Command (AETC) dedicated to C-141, C-5, C-17 and KC-135 training.

Introduced to replace slower propeller driven cargo planes such as the Douglas C-124 Globemaster II and Douglas C-133 Cargomaster, the C-141 was designed to requirements set in 1960 and first flew in 1963. Production deliveries of an eventual 285 planes began in 1965: 284 for the USAF, and a company demonstrator later delivered to National Aeronautics and Space Administration (NASA) for use as an airborne observatory. The aircraft remained in service for over 40 years until the USAF withdrew the last C-141s from service in 2006, after replacing the airlifter with the C-17 Globemaster III.

== Development ==
=== Origins ===
Throughout the early 1960s, the United States Air Force's Military Air Transport Service (MATS) relied on a substantial number of propeller-driven aircraft for strategic airlift. As these aircraft were mostly obsolescent designs and the USAF needed the benefits of jet power, the USAF ordered 48 Boeing C-135 Stratolifters as an interim step. The C-135 was a useful stop-gap, but only had side-loading doors, thus much of the bulky and oversize equipment employed by the U.S. Army would not fit.

In spring 1960, the USAF released Specific Operational Requirement (SOR) 182, calling for a new aircraft that would be capable of performing both strategic and tactical airlift missions. The strategic role demanded that the aircraft be capable of missions with a radius of at least 3,500 nautical miles (6,500 km) with a 60,000 pounds (27,000 kg) load. The tactical role required it to be able to perform low-altitude air drops of supplies, as well as carry and drop combat paratroops. The final version of SOR 182 was released in fall 1960, and requests for proposals were sent to Boeing, Douglas, Convair, and Lockheed-Georgia.

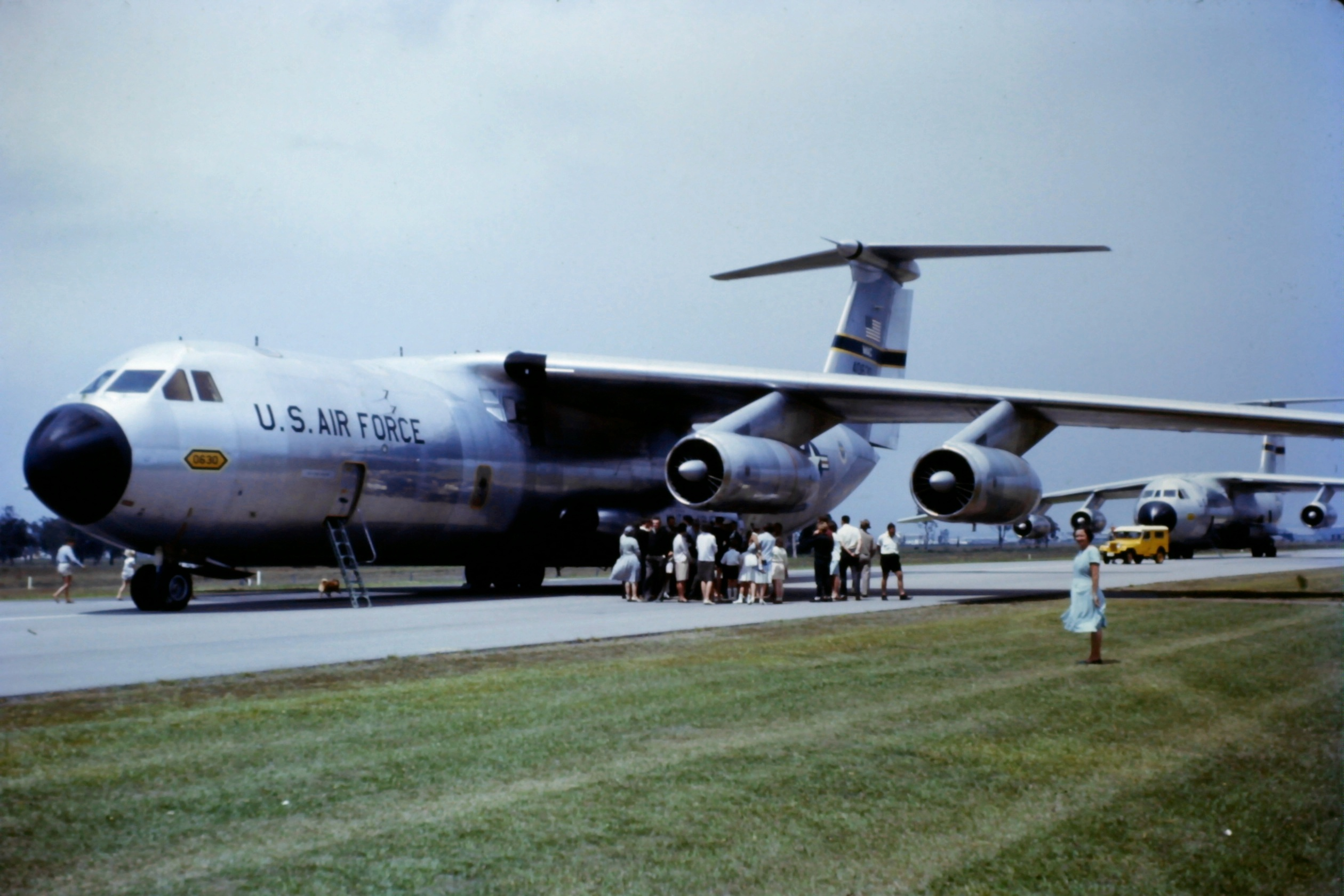
Early C-141As of 436th Airlift Wing, MAC, at Brisbane Airport, Australia, supporting the visit of President Lyndon B. Johnson, 22 October 1966

Lockheed's design team produced their own unique design in response to the requirement, internally designated as the Lockheed Model 300; it would be the first large jet designed from the start to carry freight. In comparison to the firm's previous utility transport, the turboprop-powered Lockheed C-130 Hercules, it was considerably bigger, as well as possessing greater speed and more power. In terms of its basic configuration, the Model 300 was a large airlifter, furnished with a T-tail and a high-mounted swept wing, under which a total of four pod-mounted TF33 turbofan engines were fitted. The Model 300 possessed a lengthy, unobstructed cargo deck, which provided sufficient space and fittings to safely accommodate up to 154 troops or 42,869 kg (94,510 lb) of cargo.

During March 1961, Lockheed's submission was selected as the winner. President John F. Kennedy's first official act after his inauguration was to order the development of the Lockheed 300 on 13 March 1961, placing an initial contract for five aircraft for test and evaluation, to be designated the C-141. One unusual aspect of the aircraft was that it was designed to meet both military and civil airworthiness standards. The prototype C-141A serial number 61-2775 was manufactured and assembled in record time, having been rolled out of Lockheed's factory at Marietta, Georgia on 22 August 1963. It was also the first aircraft to be designed and produced at the plant that would go into full-rate production. The prototype performed its maiden flight on 17 December of that year, coinciding with the 60th anniversary of the Wright brothers' first flight.

In conjunction with the USAF, Lockheed subjected the prototype to an intensive flight testing program, which would involve five testing and evaluation aircraft. The first delivery of a production C-141 occurred during April 1965. Over the course of three years, a total of 284 C-141s were manufactured, excluding five aircraft constructed for testing purposes. Production of new-build C-141s ended in February 1968.

=== Derivatives ===
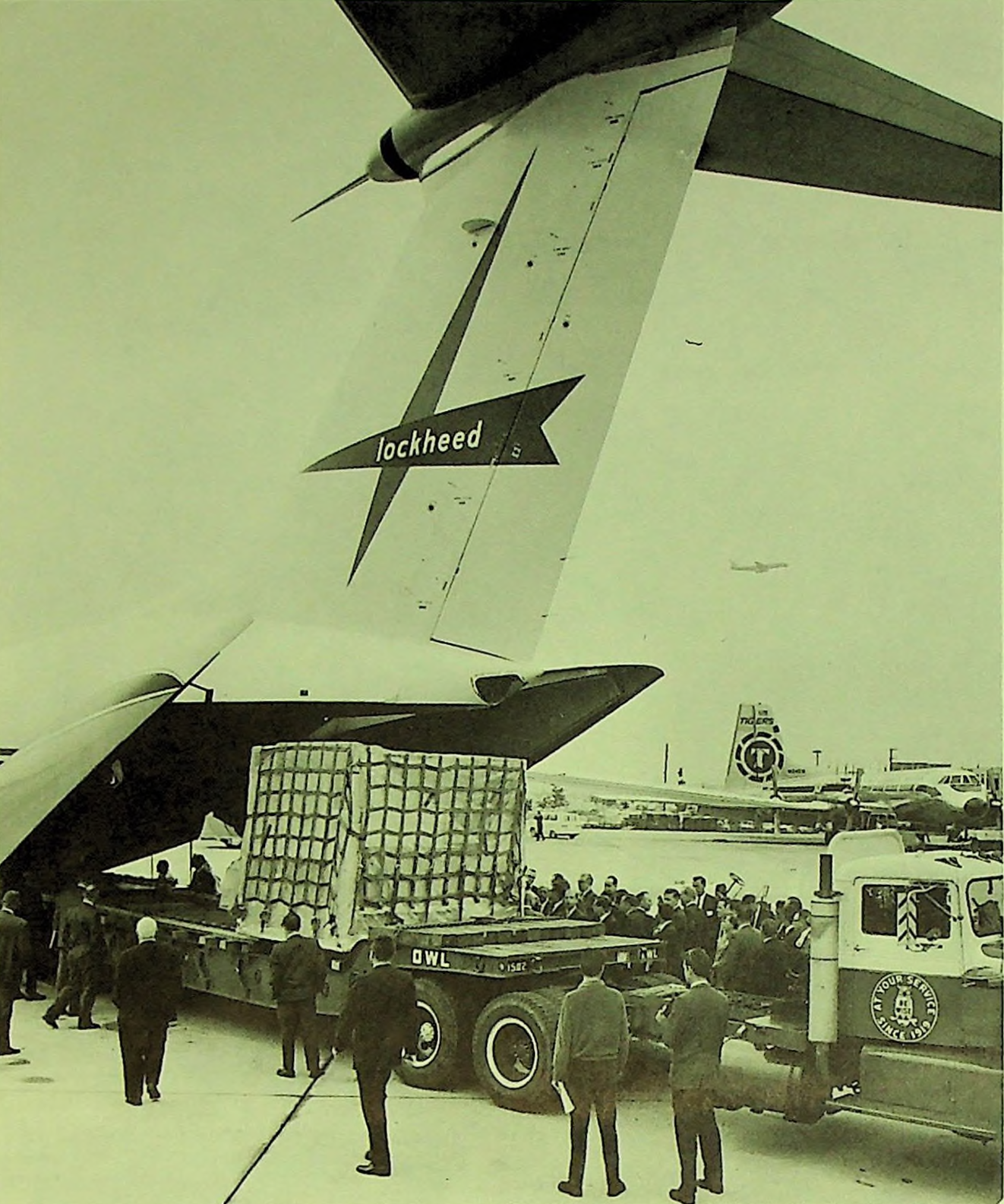
Civil Lockheed Starlifter demonstration for Flying Tiger Line, 1966

During the 1960s, Lockheed made efforts to market the aircraft on the civilian market; this resulted in provisional orders having been placed by both Flying Tiger Line and Slick Airways. These were to be a stretched version, 37 feet (11 m) longer than the C-141A, which was marketed as the L-300B or L-301 SuperstarLifter. Slick's order was ultimately for six firm, and Flying Tiger for eight. Other changes were also incorporated to adapt the design to be more suited to the commercial sector, including the use of a different control yoke. Following the satisfactory completion of civil testing, a Federal Aviation Administration (FAA) type certificate was awarded to the C-141 on 29 January 1965 to allow it to operate commercially. In summer 1965, go ahead on a commercial version seemed likely, but later that year Slick abandoned scheduled and domestic service. When no commercial sales were made, Lockheed donated the aircraft to NASA.

Another, more ambitious proposal, commonly designated as SC.5/40, sought to combine elements of the Starlifter with another strategic airlifter, the turboprop-powered Short Belfast, was to be performed in partnership with the British aircraft manufacturer Shorts. For this variant, the fuselage of the Belfast would have been paired with the wing of the Starlifter, which would have readily enabled the adoption of turbojet engines; speculated engines to power the envisioned airlifter included the Pratt & Whitney JT3D-3 (18,000 lb) or JT3D-8 (21,000 lb), Rolls-Royce Conway 550 (21,825 lb) or Bristol Siddeley BS.100 (27,000 lb approximately). A broadly similar but improved proposal, designated as SC.5/45, was heavily promoted by Shorts for Operational Requirement ASR.364, partly on the basis that it would also enable a near-identical civil-orientated model to be produced for home and export use, designated as SC.5/41. Detailed presentations on the SC.5/41 and SC.5/45 proposals were reportedly made to both British Overseas Airways Corporation (BOAC) and to the Royal Air Force (RAF) respectively, but no orders were placed.

== Design ==
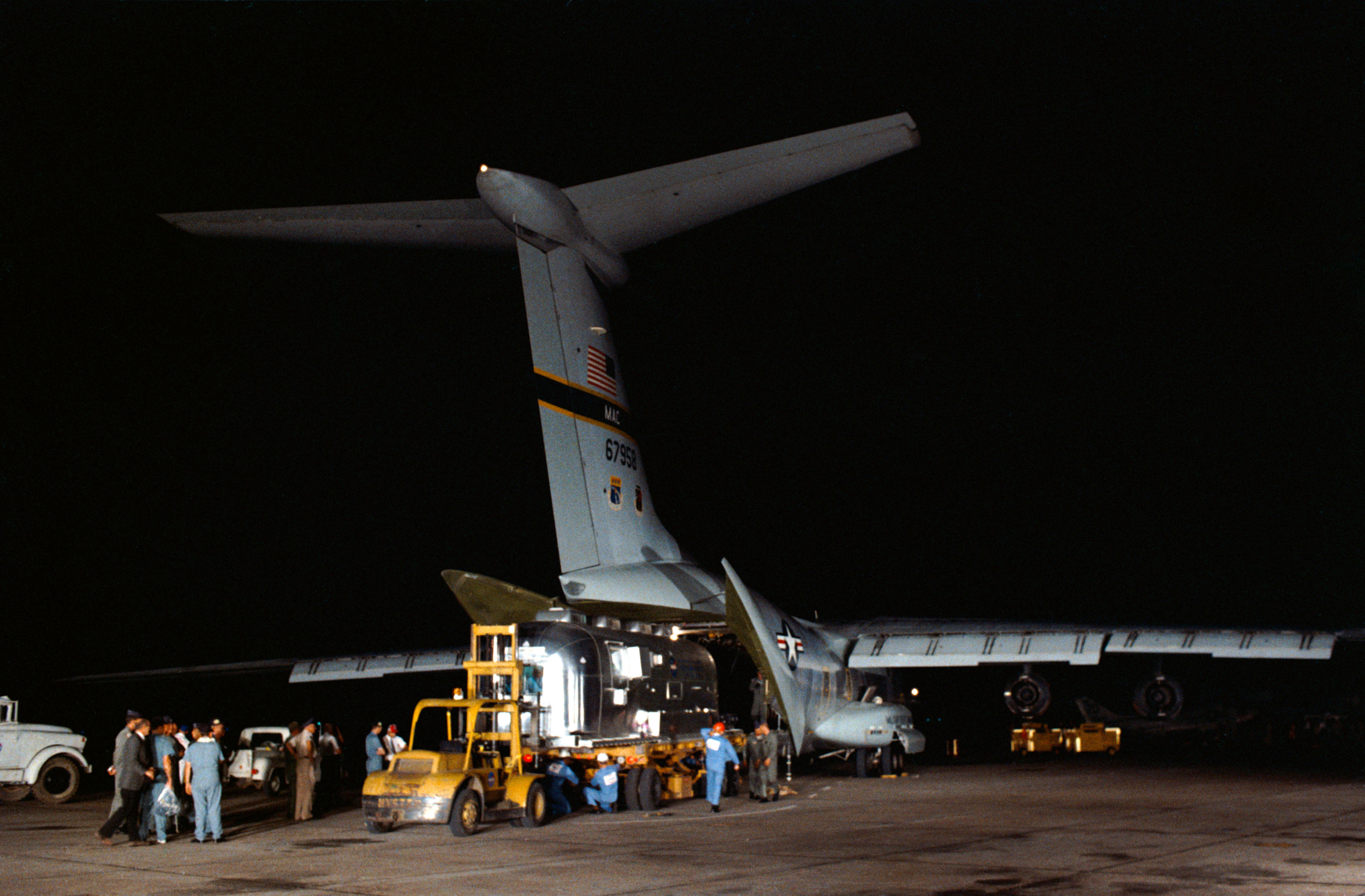
The Apollo 11 Mobile Quarantine Facility is unloaded from a C-141 at Ellington Air Force Base, 27 July 1969.

The Lockheed C-141 Starlifter is a long range strategic airlifter, designed for transporting large quantities of either cargo or passengers. It is powered by an arrangement of four TF33 turbofan engines, each capable of generating up to 21,000 pounds-force (93 kN) of thrust; these were installed in pods beneath the high-mounted swept wing. The underside accommodates the retractable tricycle landing gear, consisting of a twin-wheel nose unit and four-wheel main units, the latter of which retract forward into fairings set onto each side of fuselage. The flight deck is typically operated by a crew of four.

The use of a high-mounted wing enabled internal clearance in the cargo compartment of 10 feet (3.0 m) wide, 9 ft (2.7 m) high and 70 ft (21 m) long. Accordingly, the C-141 was capable of carrying, for example, a complete LGM-30 Minuteman intercontinental ballistic missile (ICBM) in its container; it was capable of carrying a maximum of 70,847 pounds (32,136 kg) over short distances, and carry up to 92,000 pounds (42,000 kg) when appropriately configured to carry the Minuteman, which lacked other equipment. In terms of personnel, the aircraft could carry a maximum of 154 fully-equipped troops, 123 paratroops or 80 litter patients at a time. In practice, it was discovered that, under typical conditions, the cargo deck of the C-141A would run out of volume before the maximum weight value could be reached.

In terms of ground logistics, an important aspect of the C-141 was the floor height of the cabin being only 50 inches (130 cm) above the ground, enabling easy access to the cabin via the large rear doors incorporated into the upwards-sweeping rear fuselage. This section is furnished with a large single-piece hydraulically-actuated loading ramp for simplified loading/unloading of both vehicles and general cargo. The two side-facing rear doors were designed to allow the type to be used for dropping paratroops (in August 1965, the C-141 performed the first such drop from a jet-powered aircraft). The rear cargo doors could be also opened in flight to perform airborne cargo drops.

== Operational history ==
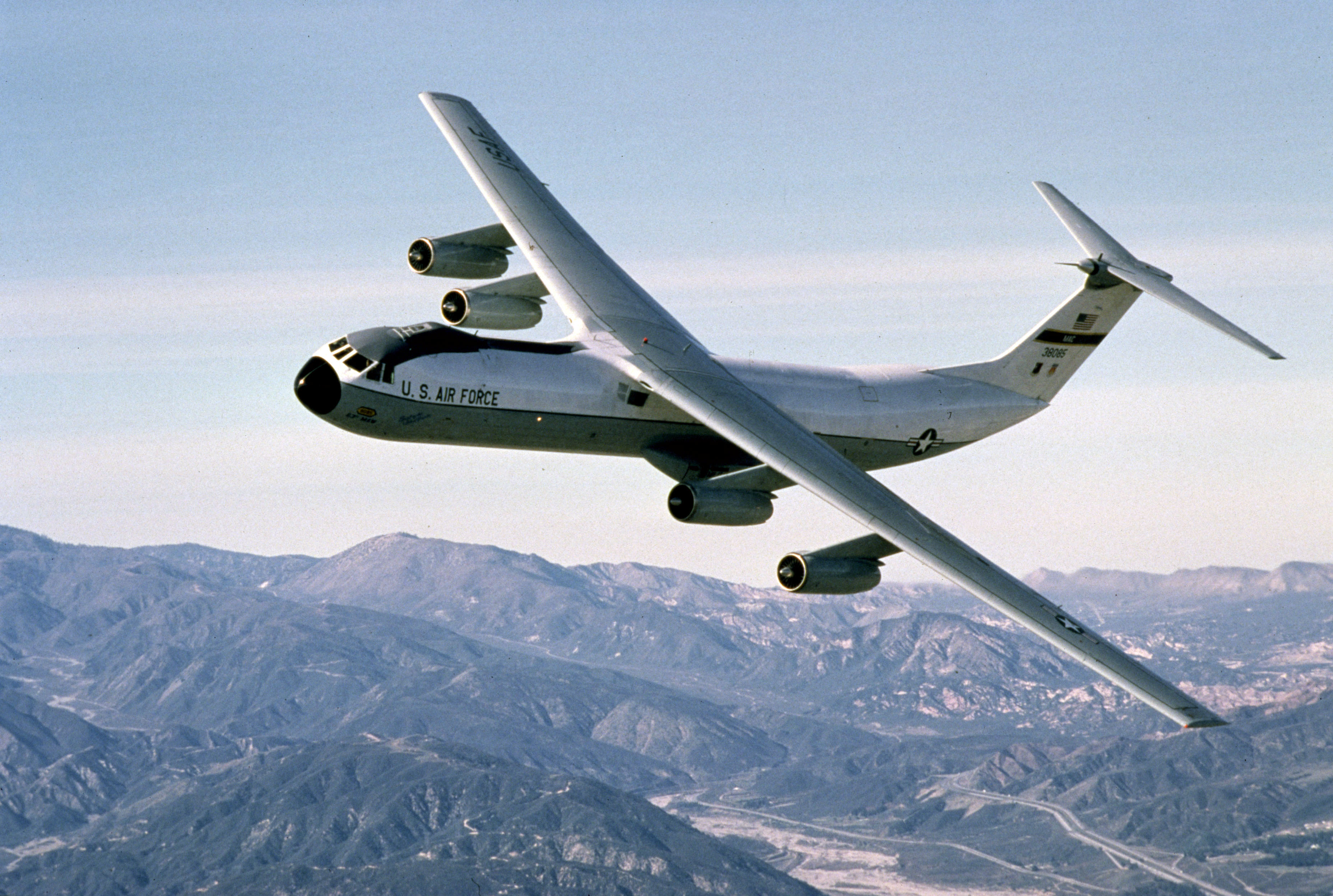
A C-141 in flight, c. 1984

The prototype and development aircraft were involved in an intensive operational testing program, along with the first C-141 to be delivered to MATS (63-8078) on 19 October 1964 to the 1707th Air Transport Wing, Heavy (Training), Tinker Air Force Base, Oklahoma. The first delivery to an operational unit (63-8088) was conducted on 23 April 1965 to the 44th Air Transport Squadron, 1501st Air Transport Wing, Travis Air Force Base, California.

Although operational testing was still underway, as a consequence of the United States' military involvement in South Vietnam, the C-141 was quickly dispatched to the region to commence operational sorties within the combat zone. The type became heavily used throughout the latter stages of the Vietnam War, its transport capabilities being in high demand. Even following the arrival of large numbers of C-141s in the Vietnam theatre, the type was never able to replace the C-124 Globemaster II fully due to its inability to transport outsize equipment in-theatre; this situation was later addressed by the introduction of the even larger C-5 Galaxy. The final duties performed by the C-141 in the conflict were repatriation flights, bringing home thousands of American prisoners of war (POWs).

Despite some operational issues experienced, the C-141 formed the backbone of the USAF's strategic airlift capability during the late 1960s; it continued to hold this status through to the late 1990s. On 8 January 1966, following the disestablishment of MATS, all C-141s were transferred to the newly established Military Airlift Command (MAC).

During October 1973, both the C-141 and the larger C-5 Galaxy airlifted supplies from the United States to Israel during the 1973 Yom Kippur War as part of Operation Nickel Grass. Over the course of the operation, C-141s flew 422 missions and carried a total of 10,754 tons of cargo. By 1975, the C-141 fleet had reportedly accumulated an average of 20,000 flight hours each, two-thirds of their original rated life span.

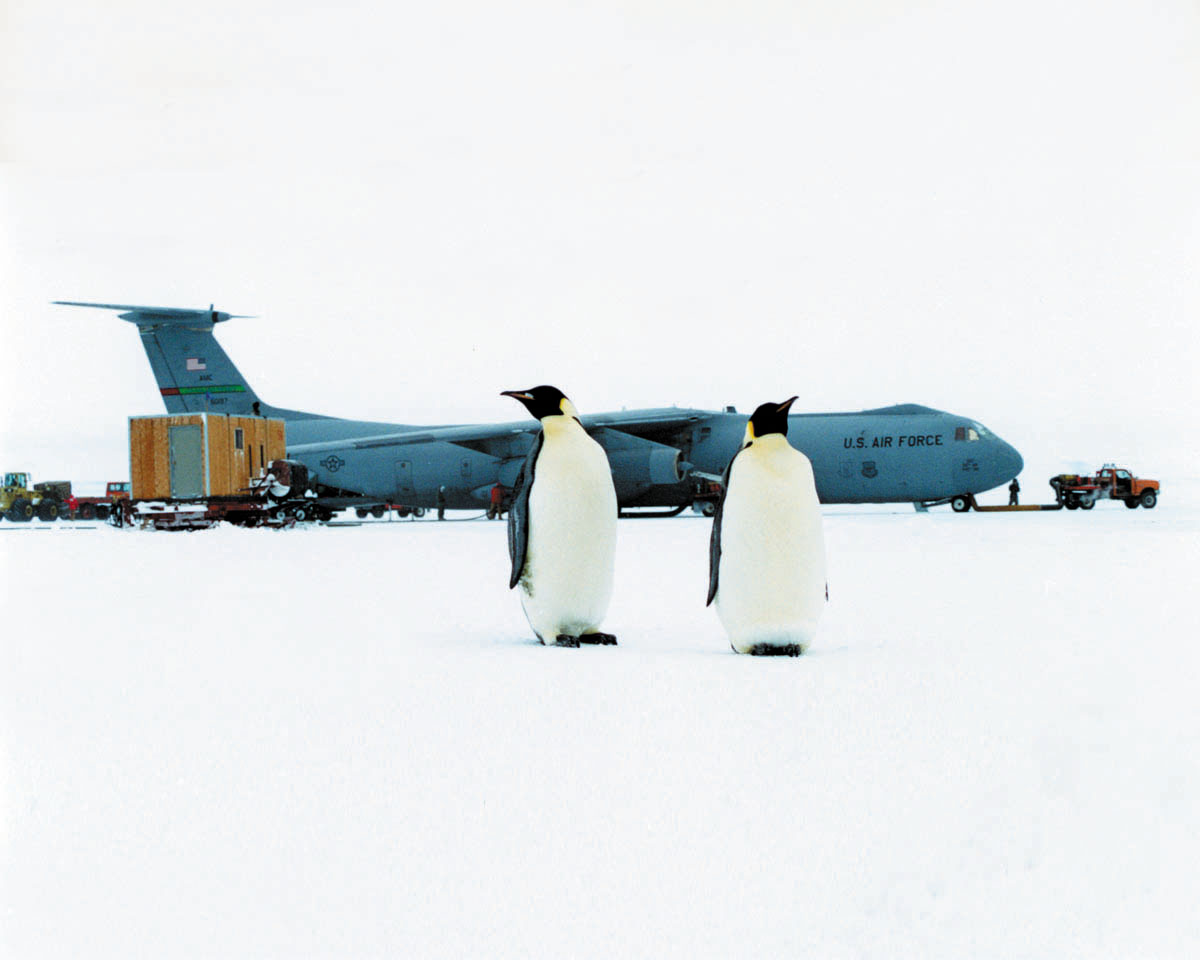
A C-141 participating in Operation Deep Freeze, October 1997 (2 Emperor Penguins can be seen standing in the foreground).

Despite an early belief that the advantages of the turbojet over preceding propeller-driven cargo aircraft would render the latter obsolete, service experiences with the C-141 found that there was still a useful role for turboprop-driven utility transports such as the Lockheed C-130 Hercules. Capabilities such as short-field takeoff performance and suitability for austere airstrips meant that such aircraft proved useful, while the C-141 proved to be anything but robust, suffering numerous instances of structural failures. Specifically, the C-141 fleet was troubled by seemingly random cracking through the wing area, which was, according to a report compiled by the Government Accountability Office (GAO), sometimes attributable to stresses imposed under certain types of missions undertaken. A planned remedial program during the 1980s to repair C-141 wing boxes uncovered significant corrosion and cracking, necessitating the replacement of all wing boxes across the fleet instead of making repairs.

During the late 1970s, the USAF opted to commence a series of major upgrades to the C-141 fleet; not only was work started on a life extension program but, in 1977, the service also accepted a proposal from Lockheed to stretch several aircraft. The first of these stretched airlifters, re-designated C-141B to differentiate it from unmodified members of the fleet, was delivered during December 1979. The final C-141B was delivered in 1982. A total of 270 C-141As were modified to the C-141B standard, comprising nearly the entire original production run.

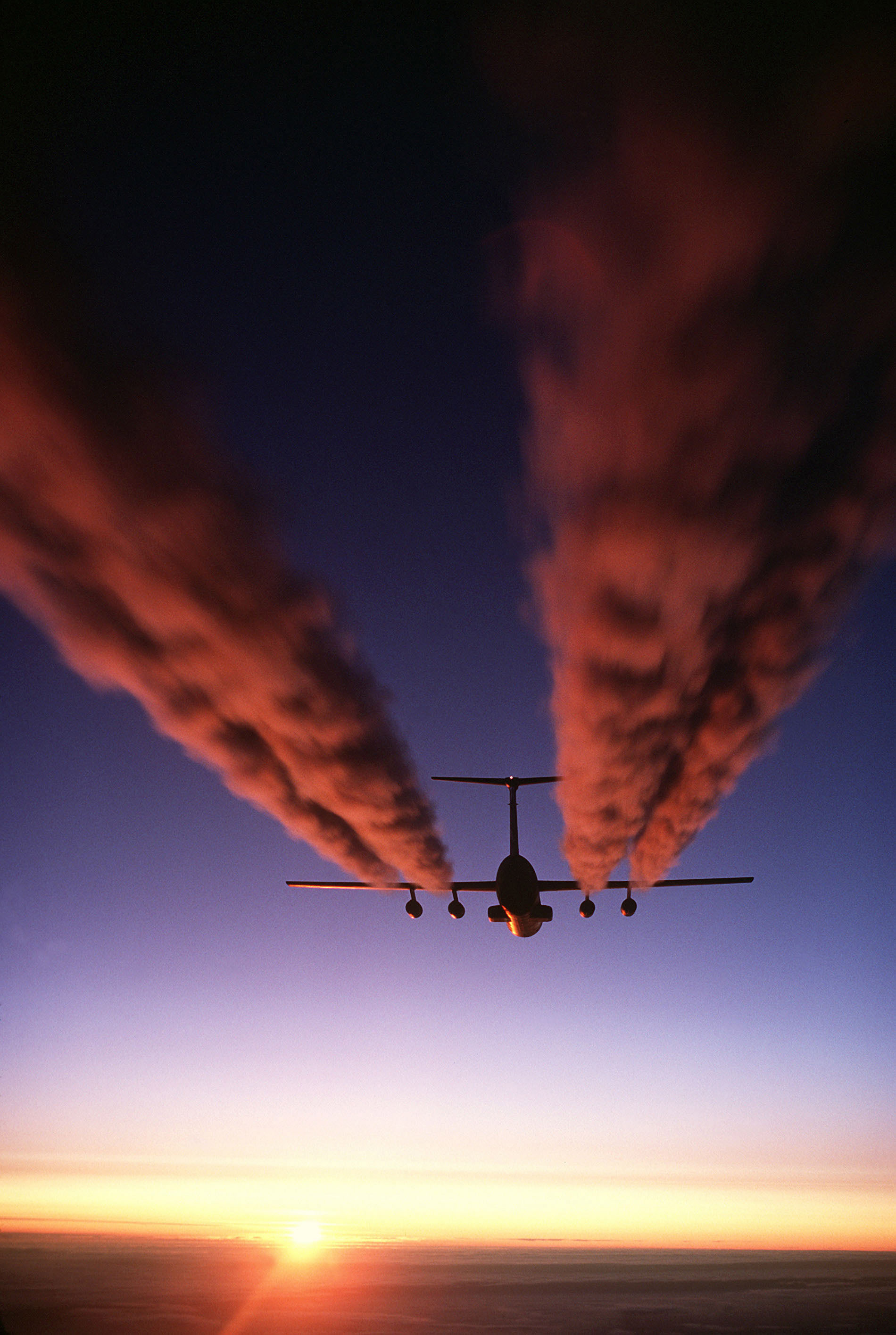
A C-141 Starlifter leaves a contrail over Antarctica

The first strategic airlift flight of Operation Desert Shield was flown by a MAC C-141 of the 437th Military Airlift Wing out of Charleston AFB, SC, on 7 August 1990. A pact between the Indian government and the US also allowed US C-141 aircraft flying in materials from the Philippines to stop in Mumbai to refuel, which led to disquiet within most of the nation's formerly pro-Iraqi stance. The C-141 proved to be a workhorse airlifter of Operations Desert Shield and Desert Storm, flying 159,462 short tons (144,661 t) of cargo and 93,126 passengers during 8,536 airlift missions. In order to provide sufficient C-141s to meet intense demands, all scheduled maintenance activities were postponed, while the planned peacetime flight hours of the fleet were doubled. According to a GAO report, weight-related operational restrictions imposed upon the fleet have little effect on performance overall. This airlift effort has been referred to as the largest in history.

On 1 June 1992, following the disestablishment of Military Airlift Command, all C-141s and the airlift wings to which they were assigned were transferred to the newly established Air Mobility Command (AMC). Air Force Reserve Command (AFRC) and Air National Guard (ANG) C-141s and units were also transferred to AMC.

By 1992, shortly following the end of Desert Storm, according to a GAO report, the C-141 fleet had, on average, nearly reached its 30,000 flight hour rated service life. While the USAF was in the process of putting the fleet through a life extension program, numerous aircraft had reached well into their extended service life already, necessitating large numbers of C-141s to be withdrawn accompanied by tight limitations on the remaining fleet's flying hours being implemented during the 1990s. The GAO warned that, should another event on the scale of Desert Storm break out, the USAF would probably experience a significant shortage in airlift capabilities due to the high fatigue state of the fleet, and noted that the C-17 Globemaster III intended to eventually replace the C-141 was experiencing delays.

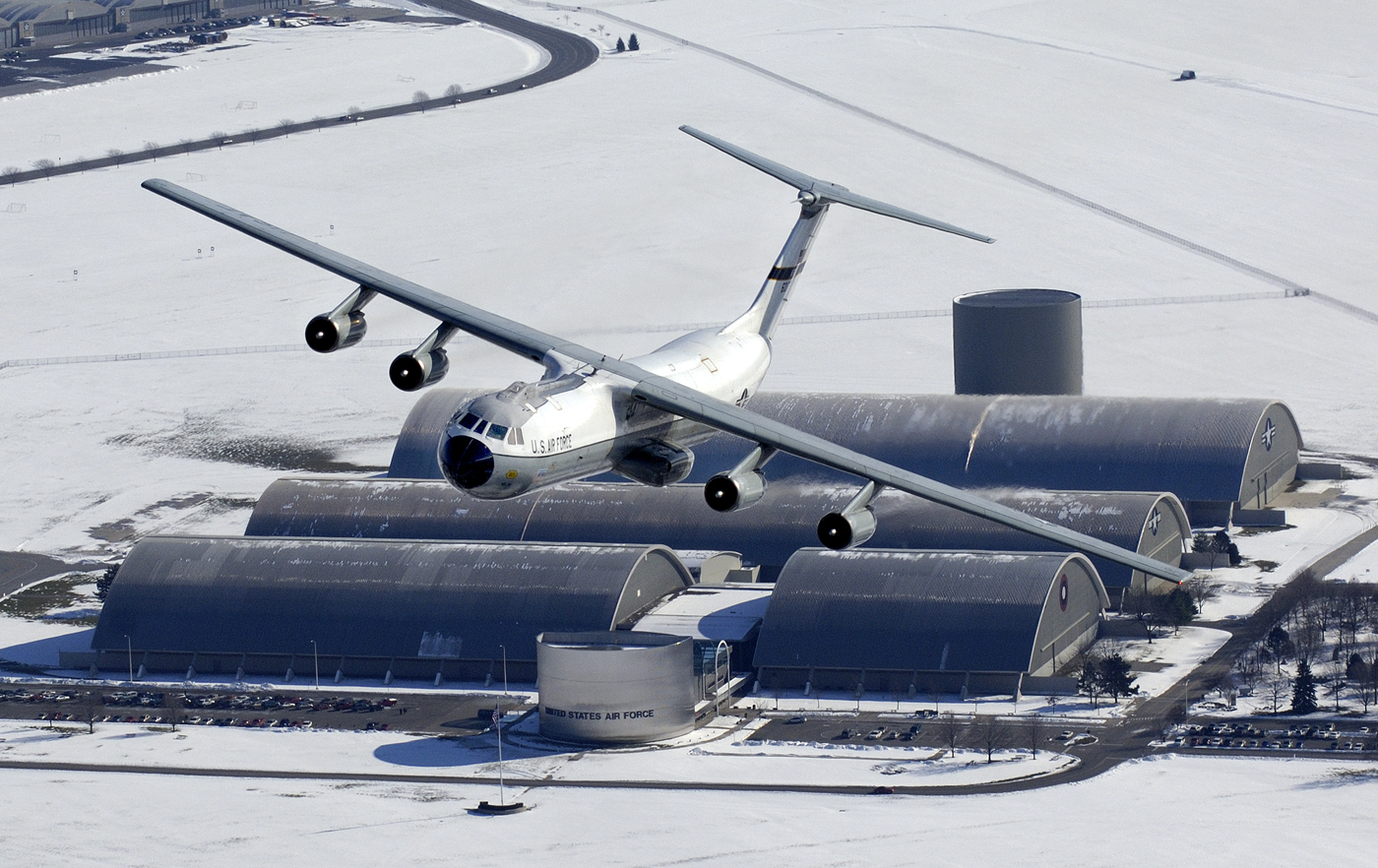
Hanoi Taxi flying over the National Museum of the United States Air Force in December 2005.

During 1994, one of the aircraft based at Wright-Patterson AFB was identified by its crew chief as the Hanoi Taxi (AF Serial Number 66-0177), the first aircraft to land in North Vietnam in 1973 for Operation Homecoming in the final days of the Vietnam War, to repatriate American POWs from North Vietnam.

Between 1996 and 1998, a C-141A was used as a towing aircraft in the Eclipse project to demonstrate the possibility of using aerotow systems to bring towed winged vehicles to sufficient altitude to launch small satellites, the ultimate goal was to lower the cost of space launches. Six successful tests were flown with a modified Convair F-106 Delta Dart, the QF-106 variant, in tow. A similar system can be seen in SpaceShipTwo, whereby atmospheric engines carry a rocket-engined "second stage" to high altitude for launch.

On 16 September 2004, the C-141 left service with all active USAF units, being confined to Air Force Reserve and Air National Guard units for the final two years of its operational service life. Between 2004 and 2006, multiple C-141s assigned to the Air Force Reserve's 445th Airlift Wing (445 AW) at Wright-Patterson AFB were deployed to Iraq and Afghanistan, where they were typically engaged in the medical evacuation (MEDEVAC) mission to repatriate wounded service members.

In 2005, Hanoi Taxi and other aircraft were marshalled by the USAF to provide evacuation for those seeking refuge from Hurricane Katrina. This aircraft and others evacuated thousands of people, including the MEDIVAC of hundreds of ill and injured. With the 5 May 2005 announcement of the retirement of the last eight C-141s, the Hanoi Taxi embarked on a series of flights, giving veterans, some of whom flew out of POW captivity in Vietnam in this aircraft, the opportunity to experience one more flight before retirement. On 6 May 2006, the Hanoi Taxi landed for the last time and was received in a formal retirement ceremony at the National Museum of the United States Air Force, located at Wright-Patterson Air Force Base near Dayton, Ohio.

There are 14 C-141s, including the "Hanoi Taxi", now on static display at various air museums around the United States. All other airframes were retired to the "boneyard" at Davis-Monthan AFB, Arizona, where they were scrapped.

== Variants ==
=== C-141A ===
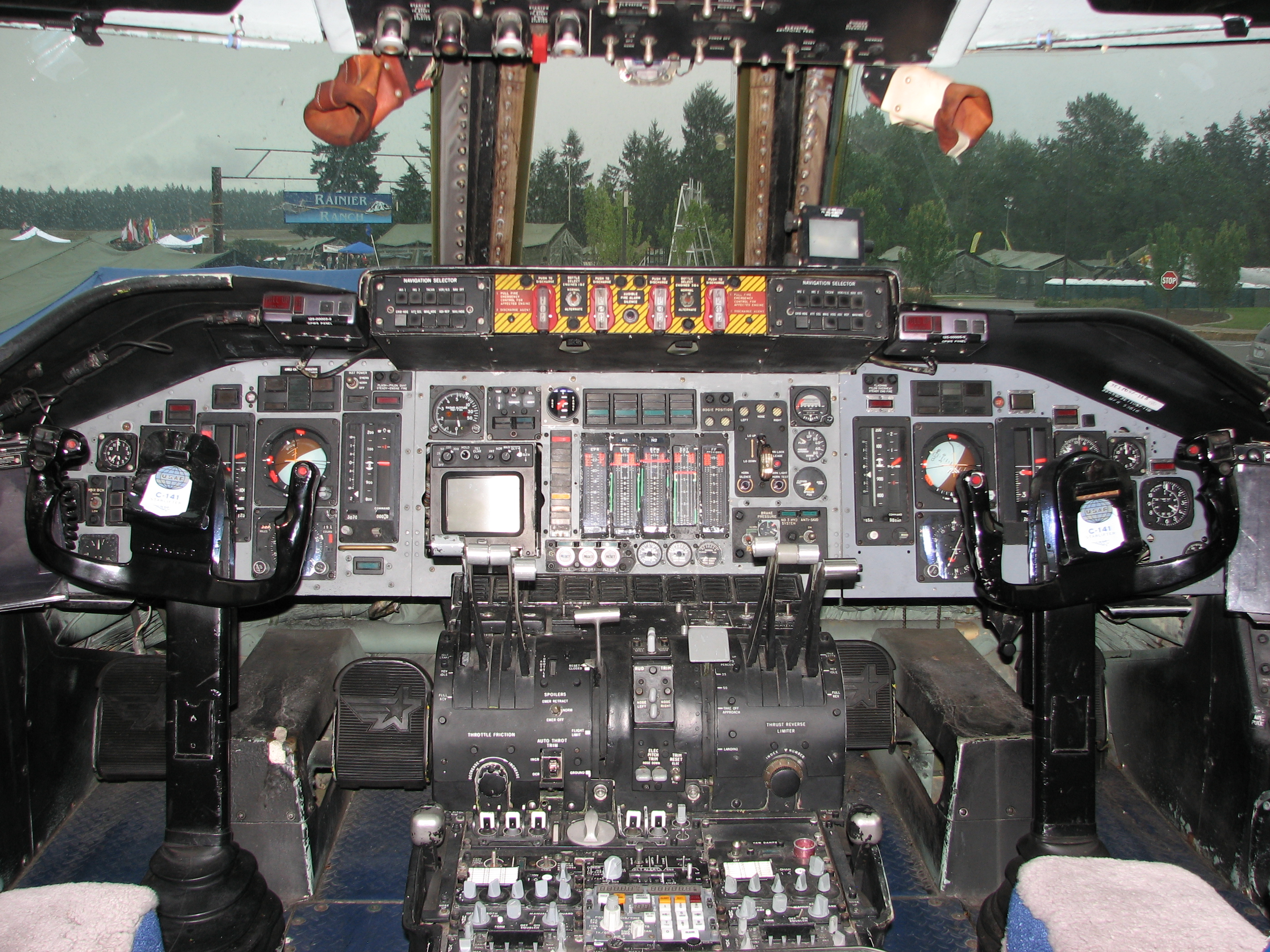
Cockpit of early C-141 on display at McChord AFB

The original Starlifter model, designated C-141A, could carry 154 passengers, 123 paratroopers or 80 litters for wounded with seating for 16. A total of 284 A-models were built. The C-141A entered service in April 1965. It was soon discovered that the aircraft's volume capacity was relatively low in comparison to its lifting capacity; it generally ran out of physical space before it hit its weight limit. The C-141A could carry ten standard 463L master pallets and had a total cargo capacity of 62,700 pounds (28,400 kg). It could also carry specialized cargoes, such as the Minuteman missile.

NASA obtained Lockheed's C-141 demonstrator, designated L-300, and modified it to house the Kuiper Airborne Observatory (KAO) telescope for use at very high altitudes. The aircraft, NC-141A, was retired in 1995 and placed in storage at NASA Ames Research Center, Moffett Federal Airfield, California. It was scrapped in 2025, with certain sections preserved for future display. The KAO was replaced by the 747SP-based Stratospheric Observatory for Infrared Astronomy (SOFIA).

=== C-141B ===
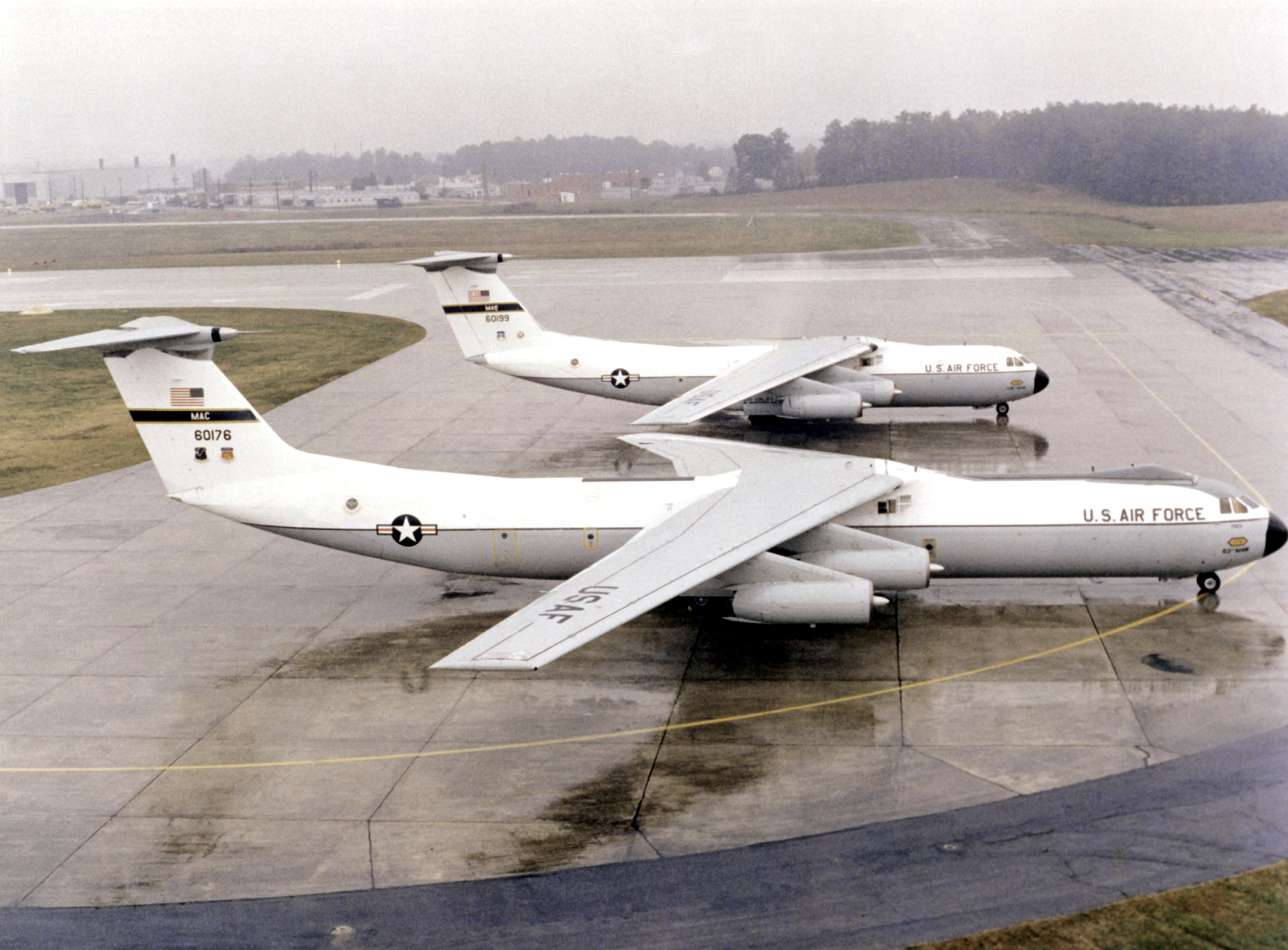
A lengthened C-141B in front of a C-141A

In service, the C-141 proved to "bulk out" before it "grossed out", meaning that it often had additional lift capacity that went wasted because the cargo hold was full before the plane's weight capacity had been reached. To correct the perceived deficiencies of the original model and utilize the C-141 to the fullest of its capabilities, 270 in-service C-141As (vast majority of the fleet) were stretched, adding needed payload volume. The conversion program took place between 1977 and 1982, with first delivery taking place in December 1979. These modified aircraft were designated C-141B. It was estimated that this stretching program was equivalent to buying 90 new aircraft, in terms of increased capacity. Also added was a boom receptacle for inflight refueling. The fuselage was stretched by adding "plug" sections forward and aft of the wings, lengthening the fuselage a total of 23 feet 4 inches (7.11 m) and allowing the carriage of 103 litters for wounded, 13 standard pallets, 205 troops, 168 paratroopers, or an equivalent increase in other loads.

==== SOLL II ====
In 1994, a total of 13 C-141Bs were given SOLL II (Special Operations Low-Level II) modifications, which gave the aircraft a low-level night flying capability, enhanced navigation equipment, and improved defensive countermeasures. These aircraft were operated by AMC in conjunction with Air Force Special Operations Command (AFSOC).

=== C-141C ===
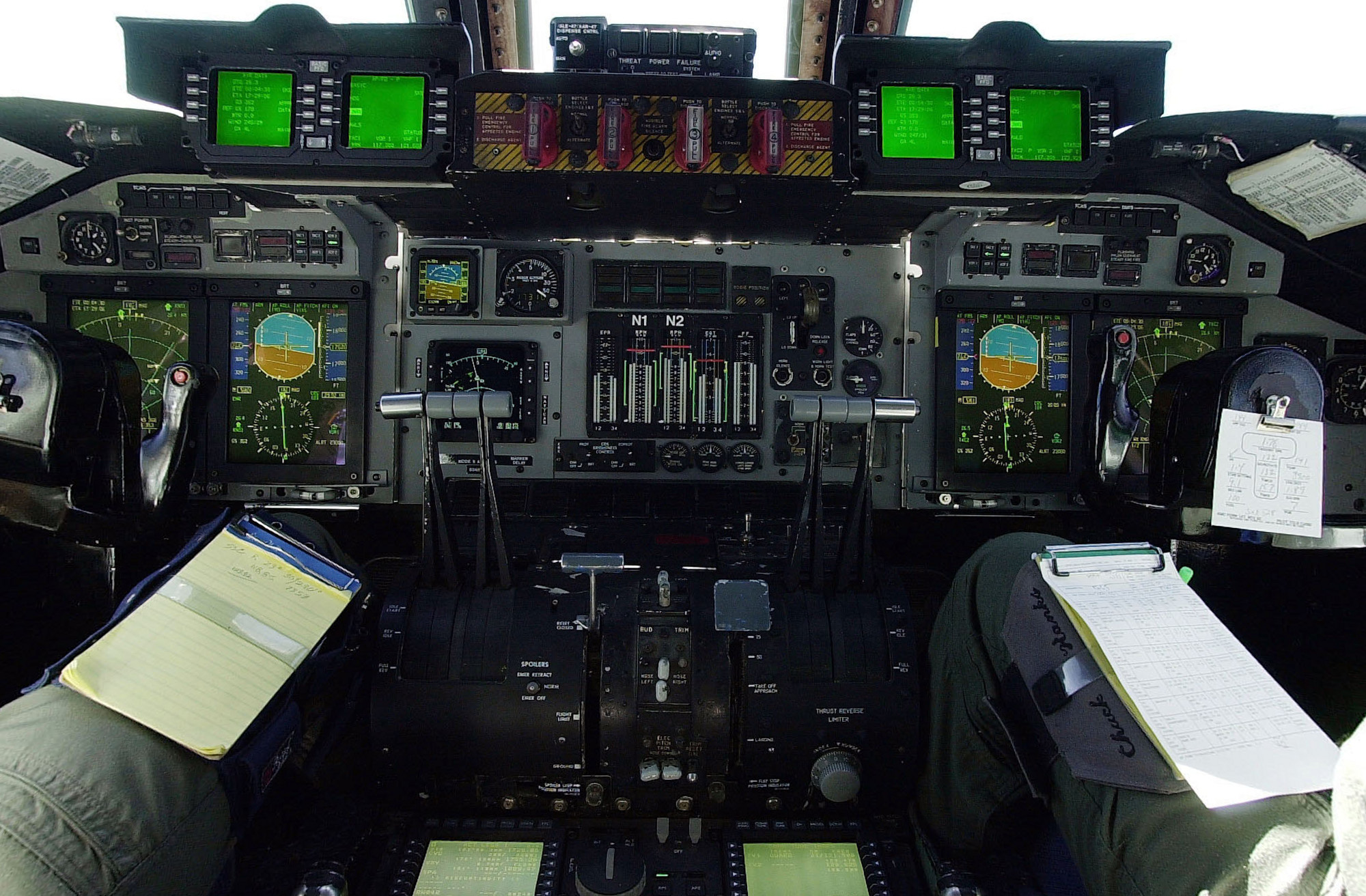
Upgraded glass cockpit of the C-141C variant

A total of 63 C-141s were upgraded throughout the 1990s to C-141C configuration, with improved avionics and navigation systems, to keep them up to date. New capabilities, including traffic collision avoidance system (TCAS) and Global Positioning System (GPS), were added to aircraft that received this upgrade package. This variant introduced some of the first glass cockpit technology to the aircraft, as well as improving reliability by replacing some mechanical and electromechanical components with more modern electronic equivalents. The final C-141C were delivered during late 2001.

== Operators ==
United States

- United States Air Force – 284 C-141A, B, and C
- NASA – One Lockheed L-300-50A-01, construction number 300-6110, built as the civil demonstrator version of the C-141A. Initially registered N4141A and operated by Lockheed, it was later acquired by NASA and registered N714NA. NASA received the aircraft in early 1972; its first astronomical research flight took place in January 1974, it was dedicated as the Kuiper Airborne Observatory in May 1975, and it was grounded in October 1995.

== Accidents ==
21 C-141s were lost to accidents in the plane's 41-year service life.

C-141 hull losses
Date	Type	Tail	Unit	Location	Fatalities	Cause	Refs
7 Sep 1966	C-141A	65-0281	62 MAW	McChord AFB, WA	3 ground crew	Ground accident (explosion and fire) during fuel systems maintenance work not performed in accordance with procedures.	
23 Mar 1967	C-141A	65-9407	62 MAW	Da Nang, Republic of Vietnam (South Vietnam)	5 crew	Ground collision after air traffic control cleared a USMC fighter jet for takeoff, but also cleared the C-141 to cross the runway. One C-141 crew member and both USMC pilots survived.	
13 Apr 1967	C-141A	66-0127	62 MAW	Cam Ranh Bay, Republic of Vietnam (South Vietnam)	7 crew	Crashed just after takeoff due to checklist deviation.	
28 Aug 1973	C-141A	63-8077	438 MAW	Hueva Castile-La Mancha, Spain (near Torrejon AB)	7 crew, 17 passengers	Ground impact in level flight due to miscommunication with Torrejon AB air traffic control and checklist deviation. One crew member survived.	
18 Aug 1974	C-141A	65-0274	437 MAW	Mount Potosi, about 17 miles (27 km) from La Paz, Bolivia	7 crew	Crashed at the 19,000 feet (5,800 m) level of a 20,000 feet (6,100 m) mountain due to navigation error in reporting position to air traffic control.	
21 Mar 1975	C-141A	64-0641	62 MAW	Mount Constance, Washington (near McChord AFB)	10 crew, 6 passengers	Air traffic control confused aircraft call signs and cleared the C-141A to descend below safe minimums.	
28 Aug 1976	C-141A	67-0006	438 MAW	Peterborough, Cambridgeshire, England, near RAF Mildenhall	14 crew, 4 passengers	Navigating through thunderstorms with an inoperative weather radar, the aircraft encountered severe turbulence and broke up in-flight while on approach for landing.	
28 Aug 1976	C-141A	67-0008	438 MAW	Søndre Strømfjord, Greenland	7 crew, 16 passengers	Flight crew attempted a go around after touchdown. The plane over-rotated, stalled, and crashed on the runway. One crew member and three passengers survived.	
18 Sep 1979	C-141	64-0647	438 MAW	Charleston, South Carolina	0	Electrical failure in landing gear handle caused nose gear to retract after landing. Fire then destroyed the aircraft.	
12 Nov 1980	C-141	67-0030	62 MAW	Cairo West Air Base, Egypt	6 crew, 7 passengers	Crashed while on a visual approach for a night landing. During the turn to final the aircraft’s bank angle and rate of descent increased until impact.	
7 Mar 1982	C-141B	67-0017	438 MAW	Cairo West Air Base, Egypt	0	Ground accident (fire) caused by an APU accumulator failure.	
31 Aug 1982	C-141B	64-0652	437 MAW	near Knoxville, Tennessee	9 crew	Crashed into a mountain during a low-level airdrop training mission in marginal weather.	
12 Jul 1984	C-141B	64-0624	315 MAW	NAS Sigonella, Lentini, Sicily, Italy	8 crew, 1 passenger	Crashed shortly after takeoff due to multiple engine failures and fire in the cargo compartment.	
15 Oct 1986	C-141B	65-0246	439 MAW	Travis Air Force Base, Solano County, California	0	While parking after landing, the left wing struck a light pole and caught fire, destroying the left wing.	
20 Feb 1989	C-141B	66-0150	63 MAW	near Hurlburt Field, Okaloosa County, Florida	7 crew, 1 passenger	Controlled flight into terrain. Crashed into ground four miles from the runway while on approach for landing, and in a high rate of descent.	
1 Dec 1992	C-141B	66-0142	62 MAW	near Harlem, Montana	6 crew	Mid-air collision with C-141 65-0255 (below) while flying a night air refueling/airdrop training mission.	
1 Dec 1992	C-141B	65-0255	62 MAW	near Harlem, Montana	7 crew	Mid-air collision with C-141 66-0142 (above) while flying a night air refueling/airdrop training mission.	
7 Oct 1993	C-141B	65-0253	60 AMW	Travis Air Force Base, Solano County, California	0	Ground accident (explosion and fire) during fuel systems maintenance work not performed to procedures.	
23 Mar 1994	C-141B	66-0173	438 MAW	Pope Air Force Base, North Carolina	24 Army personnel	Destroyed while on the ground when struck by debris from a nearby mid-air collision between an F-16 and a C-130. The aircraft was in the process of loading Army Paratroops at the time.	
13 Sep 1997	C-141B	65-9405	305 AMW	Atlantic Ocean, 80 miles off the coast of Namibia, Africa	9 crew	Mid-air collision with a German Air Force Tu-154.	
22 Dec 2001	C-141B	Unknown	164 AW	Memphis International Airport	0	Mechanical failure of the left wing structure during ground refueling caused by an incomplete maintenance procedure.	

== Aircraft on display ==
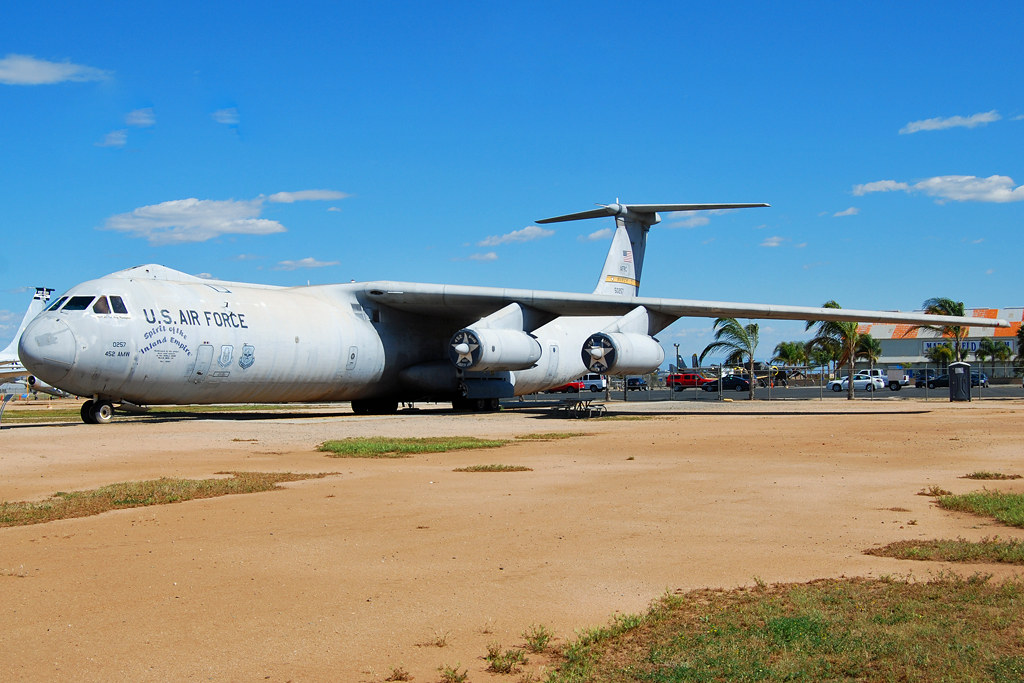
C-141B 65-0257 nicknamed "Spirit of the Inland Empire" on display at March Field Air Museum

- 61-2775 "First of the Fleet" – C-141A is on display at the Air Mobility Command Museum at Dover Air Force Base near Dover, Delaware. This airframe is the first C-141 built.
- 61-2779 "Against the Wind" – NC-141A is stored at the Air Force Flight Test Museum at Edwards Air Force Base near Rosamond, California. It was used as an Advanced Radar and Electronic Counter Countermeasures Test Bed.
- 63-8079 "City of Charleston" – C-141B is on display at the Charleston AFB Air Park at Charleston Air Force Base in Charleston, South Carolina.
- 63-8088 "The Golden Bear" – C-141B is on display at the Travis Air Force Base Heritage Center at Travis Air Force Base near Fairfield, California. It was the first C-141 delivered to Travis AFB.
- 64-0626 – C-141B is on display at the Air Mobility Command Museum at Dover Air Force Base near Dover, Delaware.
- 65-0236 – C-141B is on display at the Scott Field Heritage Air Park at Scott Air Force Base near Belleville, Illinois. This airframe participated in Operation Homecoming returning POWs from Hanoi.
- 65-0248 – C-141C is on display at the Museum of Aviation at Robins Air Force Base near Warner Robins, Georgia. This replaced another airframe that was previously on display at the museum.
- 65-0257 "Spirit of the Inland Empire" – C-141B is on display at the March Field Air Museum at March Air Reserve Base in Riverside, California.
- 65-0277 "Tacoma Starlifter" – C-141B is on display at the McChord Air Museum at McChord Air Force Base in Lakewood, Washington.
- 65-9400 – C-141B is on display at Altus Air Force Base near Altus, Oklahoma.
- 66-0177 "Hanoi Taxi" – C-141C is on display at the National Museum of the United States Air Force at Wright-Patterson Air Force Base in Dayton, Ohio. This aircraft was the last C-141 to be withdrawn from service.
- 66-0186 – YC-141B is on display at the Aviation History & Technology Center adjacent to Dobbins Joint Air Reserve Base in Marietta, Georgia. This is the first Starlifter to be converted from "A" model to "B" model.
- 66-7947 "Garden State Airlifter" – C-141B is on display at Starlifter Memorial Park at McGuire Air Force Base, New Jersey.
- 67-0013 – C-141B is on display at the Pima Air and Space Museum adjacent to Davis-Monthan Air Force Base in Tucson, Arizona.

== Specifications (C-141B Starlifter) ==
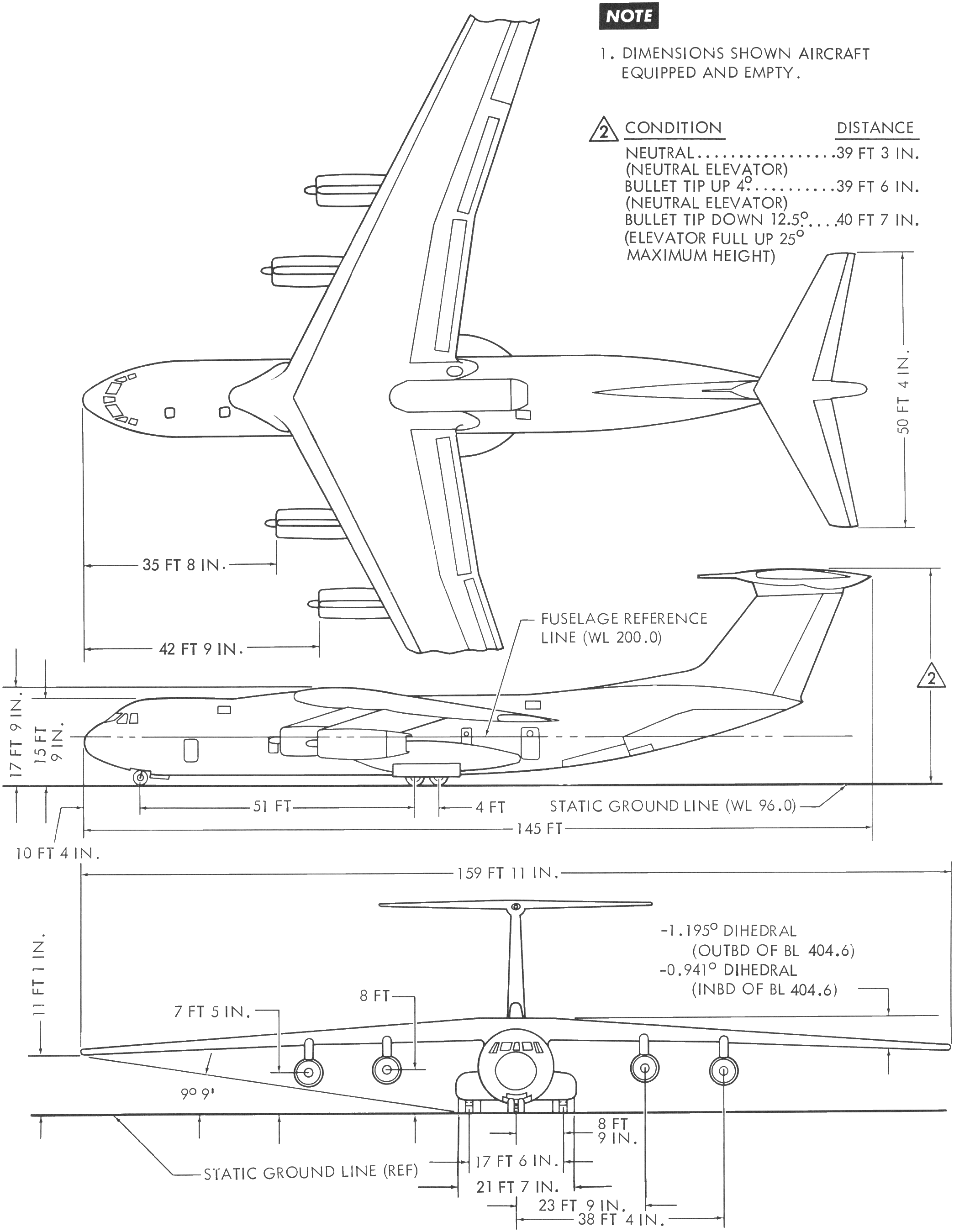
3-view line drawing of the Lockheed C-141A Starlifter

Data from Forecast International

General characteristics

- Crew: 5–7: 2 pilots, 2 flight engineers, 1 navigator, 1 loadmaster (a second loadmaster routinely used, in later years navigators were only carried on airdrop missions); 5 medical crew (2 nurses and 3 medical technicians) on medevac flights
- Length: 168 ft 4 in (51.3 m)
- Wingspan: 160 ft 0 in (48.8 m)
- Height: 39 ft 3 in (12 m)
- Wing area: 3,228 sq ft (300 m^{2})
- Empty weight: 144,492 lb (65,542 kg)
- Max takeoff weight: 342,100 lb (147,000 kg)
- Powerplant: 4 × Pratt & Whitney TF33-P-7 turbofans, 20,250 lbf (90.1 kN) thrust each

Performance

- Maximum speed: 567 mph (912 km/h, 493 kn)
- Range: 2,935 mi (4,723 km, 2,550 nmi)
- Ferry range: 6,140 mi (9,880 km, 5,330 nmi)
- Service ceiling: 41,000 ft (12,500 m)
- Rate of climb: 2,600 ft/min (13.2 m/s)
- Wing loading: 100.1 lb/sq ft (490 kg/m^{2})
- Thrust/weight: 0.25

== See also ==
- Airlift § Strategic airlift
- Military transport aircraft – Aircraft designed to carry military cargo and personnel

Related development

- Lockheed C-5 Galaxy – American heavy military transport aircraft

Aircraft of comparable role, configuration, and era

- Ilyushin Il-76 – Russian heavy four-engined military transport jet aircraft

Related lists

- List of Lockheed aircraft
- List of military aircraft of the United States
