= Eclipse Project =

Experimental NASA project

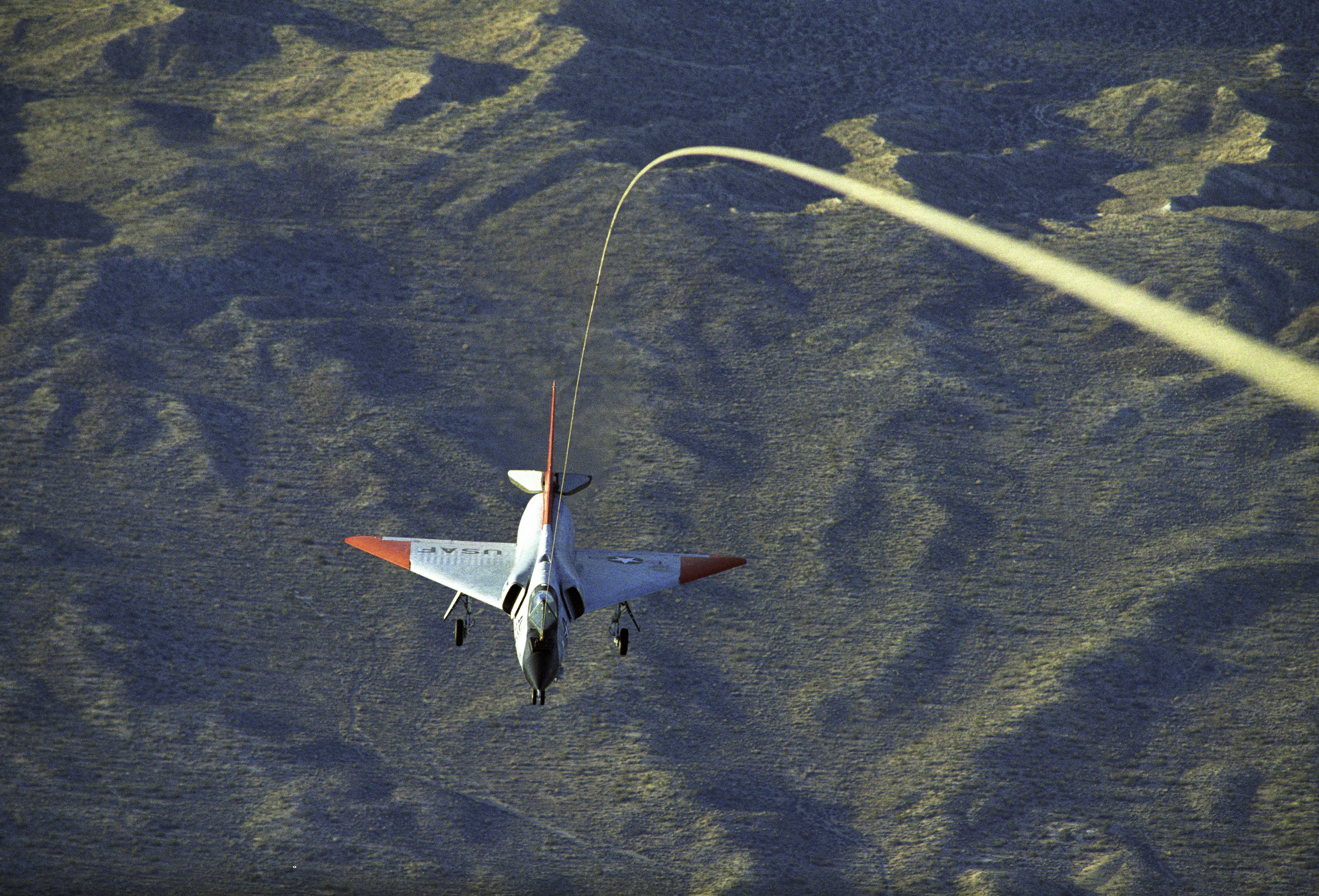
A NASA QF-106 Delta Dart from the Eclipse program under tow

In 1997 and 1998 the Dryden Flight Research Center at Edwards Air Force Base, California, supported and hosted a Kelly Space & Technology, Inc. (KST) project Eclipse, which sought to demonstrate the feasibility of a reusable tow-launch vehicle concept. The objectives were: demonstration of towed takeoff, climb-out, and separation of the EXD-01 from the towing aircraft; validation of simulation models of the towed aircraft systems; and development of ground and flight procedures for towing and launching a delta-winged airplane configuration safely behind a transport-type aircraft.

The NASA Eclipse Project was designed to examine the feasibility of towing a delta wing aircraft having high wing loading, validate the tow simulation model, and demonstrate various operational procedures, such as ground processing, in-flight maneuvers, and emergency abort scenarios. Further project goals were to successfully tow, in-flight, a modified QF-106 delta-wing aircraft with an Air Force C-141A transport aircraft. This would demonstrate the possibility of towing and launching an actual launch vehicle from behind a tow plane. The project was conducted in 1997-1998, with F-106 Delta Dart airframes modified to QF-106 drones, towed behind C-141A cargo aircraft.

The Air Force Flight Test Center (AFFTC) supplied the C-141A transport aircraft and crew and configuring the aircraft as required for the tests. The first test of the series took place on December 20, 1997, when NASA research pilot Mark Stucky flew a QF-106 on the first towed flight. Stucky flew six successful tow tests between December 1997 and February 6, 1998. On February 6, 1998 the Eclipse project accomplished its sixth and final towed flight, bringing the project to a successful completion.
