= Convair F-106 Delta Dart =

All-weather interceptor aircraft

F-106 Delta Dart
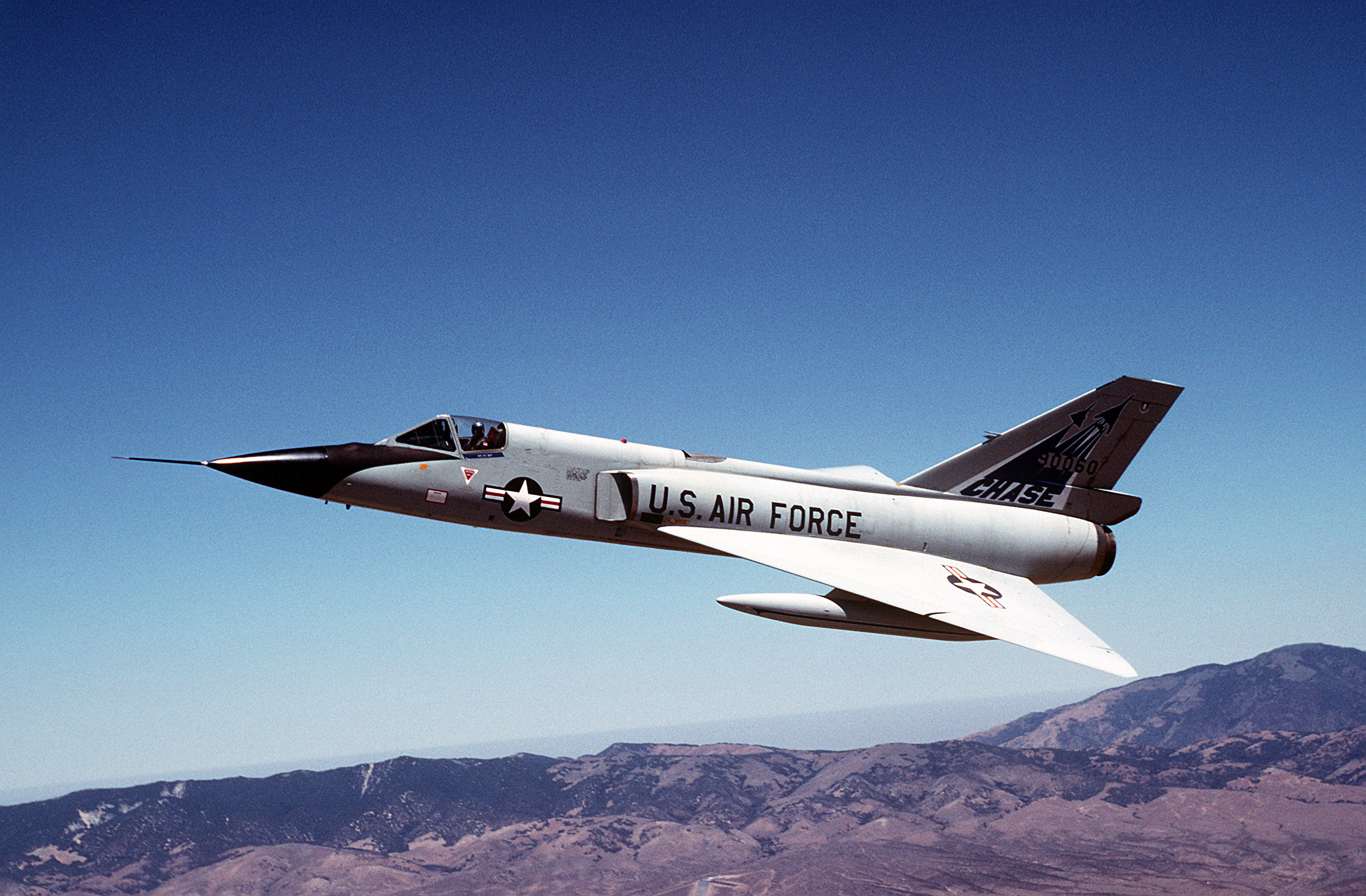
- An F-106 over the Mojave Desert: This aircraft had been used as a chase plane during flight testing for the Rockwell B-1 Lancer.

General information
- Type: Fighter interceptor
- Manufacturer: Convair/General Dynamics
- Primary users: United States Air Force Air National Guard
- Number built: 342 (2 prototypes, 277 F-106A, 63 F-106B)

History
- Introduction date: June 1959
- First flight: 26 December 1956
- Retired: August 1988 (ANG); 1998 (NASA)
- Developed from: Convair F-102 Delta Dagger

The Convair F-106 Delta Dart is an all-weather interceptor aircraft designed and produced by American aircraft manufacturer Convair, a division of General Dynamics.

The F-106 was designed as part of the 1954 interceptor program. Envisioned as an imagined Ultimate Interceptor, it was a development of the F-102 Delta Dagger, and commenced as the F-102B prior to being redesignated by the United States Air Force (USAF). The F-106 was designed without a gun or provision for carrying bombs, instead carrying its AIM-4 Falcon air-to-air missiles within an internal weapons bay; its clean exterior was beneficial to supersonic flight. Major differences from the F-102 included the adoption of the more powerful Pratt & Whitney J75 turbojet engine, heavily redesigned air inlets along with a variable-geometry inlet duct to suit a wide range of supersonic speeds, and a general increase in size. On 26 December 1956, flown by Richard L Johnson, the first prototype performed its maiden flight. After flight testing demonstrated lesser performance gains than anticipated, the USAF only ordered 350 of the planned 1,000 F-106s.

Becoming operational in June 1959, the F-106 was the primary all-weather interceptor aircraft of the USAF through much of the Cold War era; it ended up being the last specialist interceptor to be used by the service to date. It never saw combat and none were ever exported. During the 1960s, a competitive evaluation between the F-106 and the McDonnell Douglas F-4 Phantom II determined the latter to be marginally superior, yet the type continued to be operated for a further two decades due to extensive demand for the F-4 in other roles. Convair proposed various improved models of the F-106, typically focused on the radar, communications, and other avionics, but none of these schemes were pursued. In one incident over Montana on 2 February 1970, an unpiloted F-106 recovered from a flat spin after its pilot had ejected, belly landing relatively intact in a snow-covered field; it was recovered and continued to be flown for years afterwards.

The F-106 was gradually withdrawn from USAF service during the 1980s as the arrival of newer air superiority fighters, particularly the McDonnell Douglas F-15 Eagle, had made the role of dedicated interceptor obsolete. Numerous F-106s were operated for a time by the Air National Guard. Many withdrawn aircraft were converted into target drones and redesignated QF-106 under the Pacer Six program, which were used up in 1998. A handful of F-106s were operated by NASA for experimental purposes, such as the Eclipse Project, until 1998.

== Development ==
=== Background ===
The F-106 was the ultimate development of the USAF's 1954 interceptor program of the early 1950s. The initial winner of this competition had been the F-102 Delta Dagger, but early versions of this aircraft had demonstrated extremely poor performance, being limited to flying at subsonic speeds and relatively low altitudes. During the testing program the F-102 underwent numerous changes to improve its performance, notably the application of the area rule to the fuselage shaping and a change of engine, and the dropping of the advanced MX-1179 fire control system and its replacement with a slightly upgraded version of the MX-1 already in use on subsonic designs. The resulting aircraft became the F-102A, and in spite of being considered barely suitable for its mission, the Air Force sent out a production contract in March 1954, under which the first deliveries were expected during the following year.

By December 1951, the Air Force had turned its attention to a further improved version, which was initially referred to as the F-102B. The main planned change was the replacement of the F-102A's Pratt & Whitney J57 (which had itself replaced the original J40) with the more powerful Wright J67 (a Bristol Olympus produced under license). By the time this engine would be available, the MX-1179 was expected to be available, and thus it was selected as well. The intended result would be the "ultimate interceptor" that the USAF had originally sought. However, while initial work on the Olympus design appeared to go well, by August 1953 Wright was already a full year behind schedule in development. Continued development did not resolve problems with the engine, and in early 1955 the Air Force approved the switch to the Pratt & Whitney J75.

The J75 turbojet engine was a bigger engine than the J57 in the F-102A and it needed greater airflow in the engine. This demanded changes to the air inlets of the engine to allow more airflow and led to the further refinement of using a somewhat shorter variable-geometry inlet duct to allow the intakes to be tuned to best performance across a wide range of supersonic speeds. The fuselage grew slightly longer, and was cleaned up and simplified in many ways. The wing was slightly enlarged in area, and a redesigned vertical tail surface was used. The engine's two-position afterburner exhaust nozzle was also used for idle thrust control, held open to decrease thrust by 40%, resulting in slower taxiing and less brake wear.

=== Competing efforts and production arrangements ===
Throughout its early development, the F-102B had to compete for attention and resources with the F-102A; the aviation author Marcelle Knaack observed that there were fewer funds to develop the more capable systems of the F-102B, which would have been useful in more quickly overcoming some of the technical difficulties that arose. The number of F-102As on order grew substantially beyond that which had been originally forecast, indicative of the growing importance attached to what had once been intended to be an interim or 'stop-gap' aircraft to fill in until the F-102B could be delivered. During December 1955, a mock-up with the expected layout of the MX-1179, now known as the MA-1, was inspected and approved.

On 18 April 1956, an extended production contract for 17 F-102Bs was issued to Convair, representing substantially fewer aircraft than had been originally anticipated at this stage. On 17 June of that year, the aircraft was officially re-designated as the F-106A. On 18 August 1956, the USAF issued a systems development directive that called for development and production of the F-106 to occur simultaneously; Knaack attributed this policy as being responsible for several later problems in the program. During April 1957, the USAF formally rejected Convair's F-102C proposal (essentially a reengined model of the F-102) to concentrate on the more advanced F-106 program, which it had then anticipated to enter service during the following year.

=== Flight testing ===
On 26 December 1956, the first prototype F-106, an aerodynamic test bed, performed its maiden flight from Edwards Air Force Base. On 26 February 1957, the second prototype, which was outfitted with a fuller set of equipment, made its first flight. Early flight testing around the end of 1956 and beginning of 1957 demonstrated somewhat disappointing results, having achieved less of a performance gain over the F-102 than had been anticipated. Specifically, both the acceleration and maximum speed were beneath Convair's own estimates. Furthermore, both the engine and avionics proved to be somewhat unreliable. These combined problems, and the delays associated with them, were nearly responsible for the termination of the program.

However, the service decided to persist with the F-106 program after the Air Defense Command had heavily advocated for it. Based upon the test data submitted, USAF officials had determined that modifications to the inlet duct cowling and charging ejectors were likely to increase both acceleration and speed; modifications would be made following the completion of Category II testing and were evaluated during Category III testing. At this stage, the service enacted several measures to hasten development towards production; in April 1957, it authorized the conditional acceptance of several F-106s being used by Convair for flight testing; it also took several quick decisions to settle outstanding development questions. By mid-1957, funding for 120 F-106As had been allocated. The USAF ultimately opted to order 350 F-106s, substantially fewer than the planned fleet of 1,000 aircraft. Deliveries of the single-seat F-106A and the twin-seat F-106B combat-capable trainer variant commenced to 15 fighter interceptor squadrons in October 1959.

=== World speed record ===
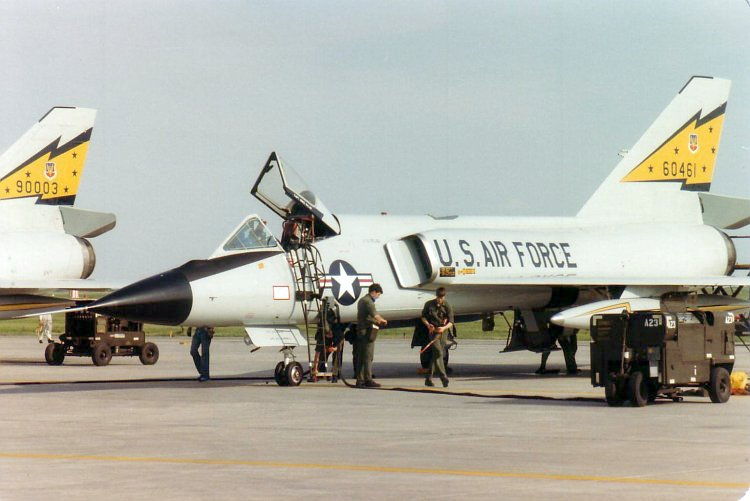
F-106A Delta Darts from 5 FIS at CFB Moose Jaw in 1982

On 15 December 1959, Major Joseph W. Rogers set a world speed record of 1,525.96 mph (2,455.79 km/h) in a Delta Dart at 40,500 ft (12,300 m). That year, Charles E. Myers flew the same model aircraft at 1,544 mph (2,484 km/h).

== Design ==
The F-106 was envisaged as a specialized all-weather missile-armed interceptor to shoot down bombers. It was complemented by other Century Series fighters for other roles such as daylight air superiority or fighter-bombing. To support its role, the F-106 was equipped with the Hughes MA-1 integrated fire-control system, which could be linked to the Semi-Automatic Ground Environment (SAGE) network for ground control interception (GCI) missions, allowing the aircraft to be steered by controllers. The MA-1 proved extremely troublesome and was eventually upgraded more than 60 times in service.

Similarly to the F-102, the F-106 was designed without a gun, or provision for carrying bombs, but it carried its missiles in an internal weapons bay for clean supersonic flight. It was armed with four Hughes AIM-4 Falcon air-to-air missiles (either AIM-4G infra-red guided missiles or semi-active radar homing (SARH)-guided (which detected reflected radar signals) AIM-4E/F missiles), along with a single 1.5 kiloton-warhead AIR-2 (MB-2) Genie unguided air-to-air rocket intended to be fired into enemy bomber formations. Like its predecessor, the F-102 Delta Dagger, it could carry a drop tank under each wing. Later fighters such as the McDonnell Douglas F-4 Phantom II and McDonnell Douglas F-15 Eagle carried missiles recessed in the fuselage or externally, but stealth aircraft would re-adopt the idea of carrying missiles or bombs internally for reduced radar signature.

The first ejection seat fitted to early F-106s was a variation of the seat used by the F-102 and was called the Weber interim seat. It was a catapult seat which used an explosive charge to propel it clear of the aircraft. This seat was not a zero-zero seat and was inadequate for ejections at supersonic speeds as well as ground level ejections and ejections at speeds below 120 knots (140 miles per hour; 220 kilometres per hour) and 2,000 feet (610 metres). The second seat that replaced the Weber interim seat was the Convair/ICESC (Industry Crew Escape System Committee) Supersonic Rotational B-seat, called the supersonic "bobsled", hence the B designation. It was designed with supersonic ejection as the primary criterion since the F-106 was capable of Mach-2 performance. Fighter pilots viewed high speed ejections as the most important. Seat designers viewed an ejection at low altitude and slow speed as the most likely possibility. The ejection sequence with the B-seat was quite complicated and there were some unsuccessful ejections that resulted in pilot fatalities. The third seat, that replaced the Convair B-seat, was the Weber Zero-Zero ROCAT (for Rocket Catapult) seat. Weber Aircraft Corporation designed a "zero-zero" seat to operate at up to 600 knots (690 miles per hour; 1,100 kilometres per hour). High-altitude supersonic ejections were rare and ejections at relatively low altitudes and low speeds were more likely. The Weber "zero-zero" seat was satisfactory and was retrofitted to the F-106 after 1965.

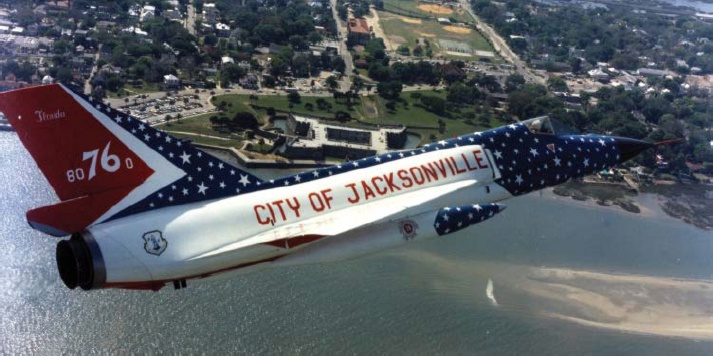
Florida National Guard F-106A "City of Jacksonville" Livery for the U.S. Bicentennial

== Operational history ==
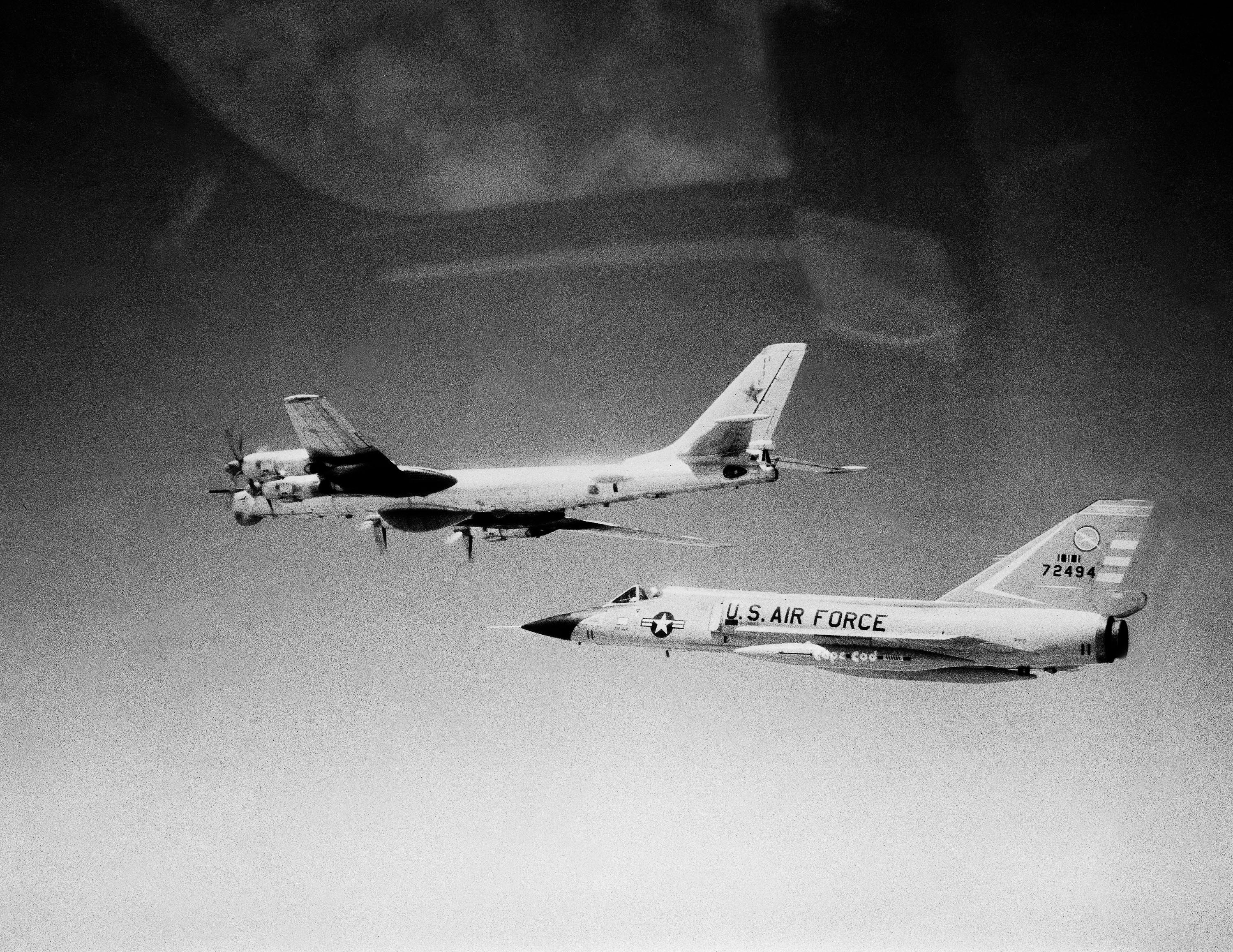
A Soviet Tu-95 is intercepted by a F-106A off Cape Cod in 1982

Early operations of the F-106 were troubled by numerous technical issues. These included generator defects, fuel-flow issues (particularly during cold weather), and combustor-starter malfunctions. During December 1959, all F-106s were temporarily grounded following the accidental jettisoning of the canopy mid-flight on one aircraft. Many, but not all, of these problems were resolved by the start of 1961; this can be partially attributed to two major modification and retrofit program conducted during this timeframe. Following the resolution of initial teething problems – in particular an ejection seat that killed the first 12 pilots to eject from the aircraft – its exceptional performance led to the aircraft becoming relatively popular amongst its pilots.

The F-106 served in the contiguous US, Alaska, and Iceland, as well as for brief periods in Germany and South Korea. The F-106 was the second highest sequentially numbered P/F- aircraft to enter service under the old number sequence (the F-111 was highest), before the system was reset under the 1962 United States Tri-Service aircraft designation system. In service, the F-106's official name, "Delta Dart," was rarely used, and the aircraft was universally known simply as "The Six." The arrival of the F-106 in quantity quickly led to the withdrawal of various older aircraft that were being used in the interceptor role, such as the North American F-86 Sabre and the Northrop F-89 Scorpion.

Although contemplated for use in the Vietnam War, the F-106 never saw combat, nor was it exported to foreign users. After the cancellation of their own Avro Arrow, the Canadian government briefly considered purchasing the F-106C/D.

To standardize aircraft types, the USAF was directed to conduct Operation Highspeed, a flyoff competition between the USAF F-106A and the U.S. Navy F4H-1 (F-4B) Phantom, which was not only as capable as the F-106 as a missile-armed interceptor but could carry as large a bomb load as the Republic F-105 Thunderchief fighter-bomber. The Phantom was the winner but would first be used to escort and later replace the F-105 fighter-bomber in the late 1960s before replacing older interceptors in Air Defense Command in the 1970s.

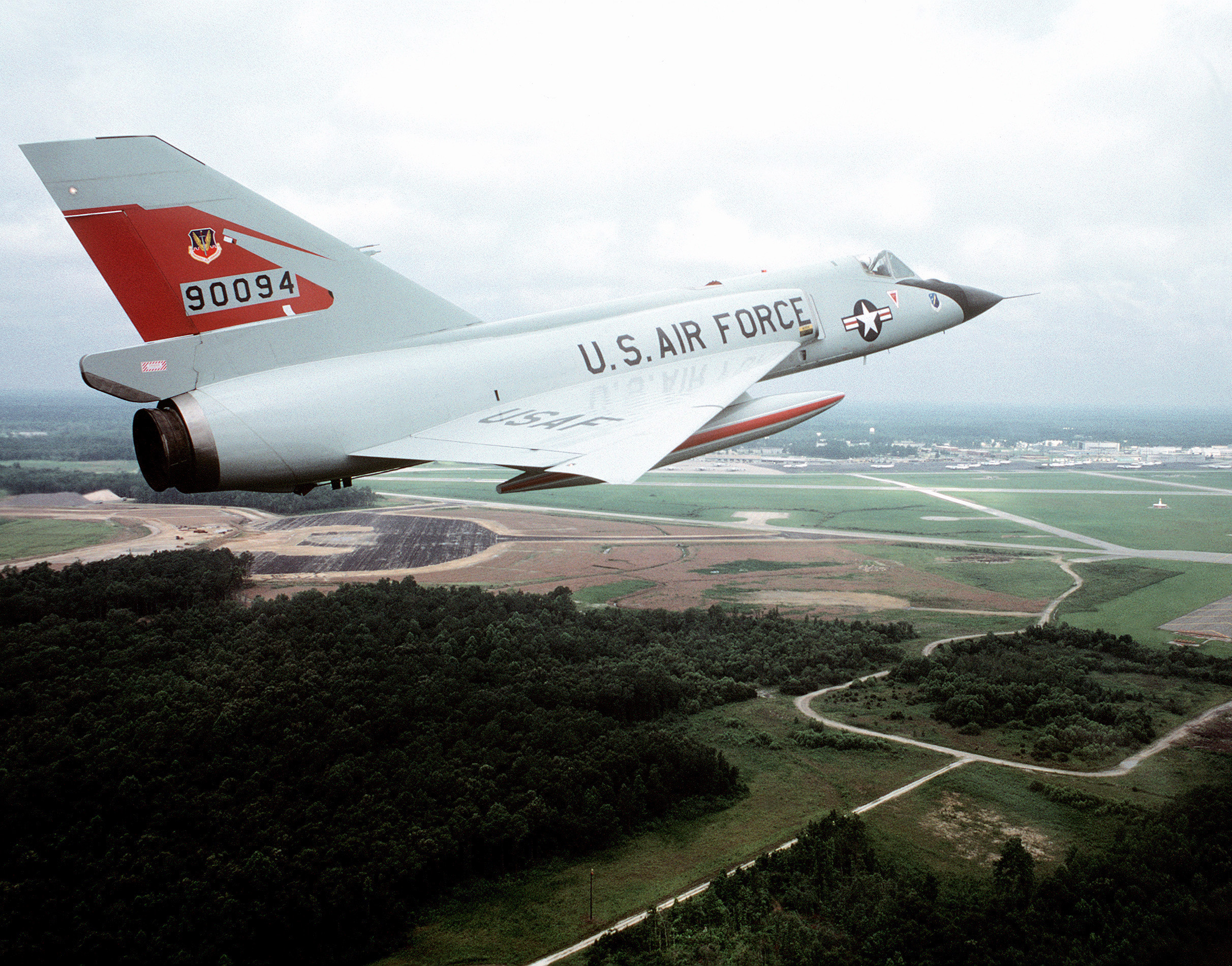
An F-106A of the 87th FIS above Charleston AFB, SC in 1982

The F-106 was progressively updated in service, with improved avionics, a modified wing featuring a noticeable conical camber, an infrared search and track (IRST) system, streamlined supersonic wing tanks which provided virtually no degradation to overall aircraft performance, better instrumentation and features like an inflight refuelling receptacle and an arrestor hook for landing emergencies.

Air-to-air combat testing suggested "The Six" was a reasonable match for the F-4 Phantom II in a dogfight, with superior high-altitude turn performance, overall maneuverability (aided by the aircraft's lower wing loading) and a higher top speed. While the twin-engine F-4 had much better acceleration, it had a lower top speed than the F-106, which could usually catch up and overtake it. The Phantom had better radar – operated by an additional crewman – and could carry a load of up to four radar-guided AIM-7 Sparrow and four infrared AIM-9 Sidewinder missiles, while the AIM-4 Falcon missiles carried by the F-106 proved a disappointment for dogfighting over Vietnam. The F-4 had a higher thrust/weight ratio with superior climb, better high speed/low-altitude maneuverability and could be used as a fighter-bomber. Air combat experience over Vietnam showed the need for increased pilot visibility and the utility of a built-in gun, which had been added to the "E" variant of USAF Phantoms.

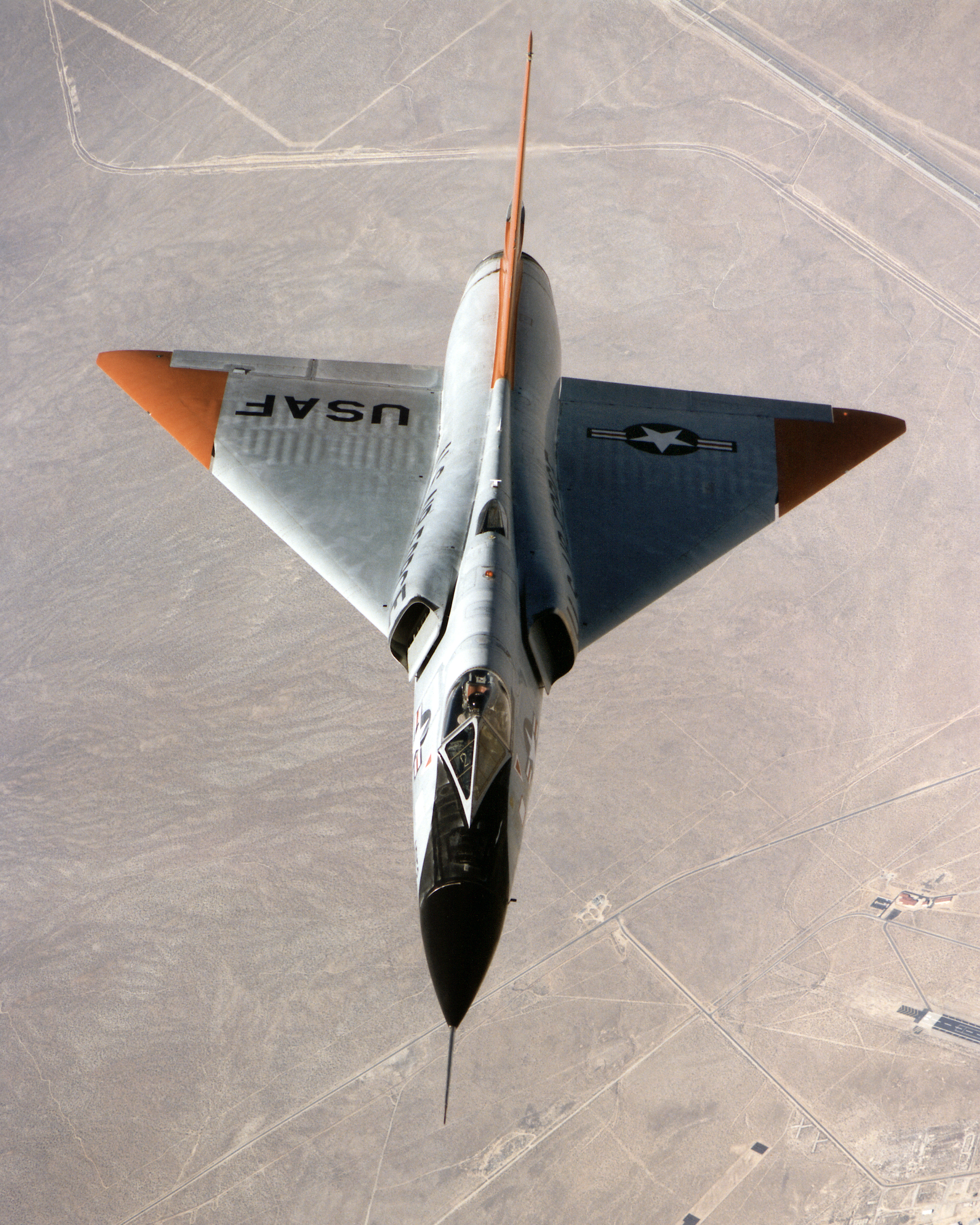
A NASA QF-106 Delta Dart from the Eclipse program shows its area ruled fuselage

In 1972, some F-106As were upgraded in Project Six Shooter that involved fitting the F-106 with a new canopy without metal bracing which greatly improved pilot visibility, an optical gunsight and provision for a M61 Vulcan 20 mm cannon, replacing the AIR-2 Genie and its nuclear warhead. The M61 Vulcan was mounted in the center of the weapons bay, had 650 rounds of ammunition. While all F-106A model aircraft received the Six-Shooter modifications, and many of them received guns, most continued to fly operationally with the AIR-2.

In intra-USAF exercises against both Lockheed F-104 Starfighter and F-4 units, F-106 pilots were reportedly victorious on many occasions.

The F-15A Eagle started replacing the F-106 for some units in 1981, with "Sixes" typically passed on to Air National Guard units. The F-106 remained in service in various USAF and ANG units until 1988.

=== Retirement and conversion into drones ===
Between 1 June 1983 and 1 August 1988 the Delta Darts were incrementally removed from service and sent to the Military Storage and Disposition Center in Arizona. When the need for a high performance Full Scaled Aerial Target Drone was required, the USAF began withdrawing Delta Darts from storage. Starting in 1986, 194 of the surviving surplus aircraft were converted into target drones and these were designated QF-106As and used for target practice vehicles under the Pacer Six Program by the Aerial Targets Squadron. The last was destroyed in January 1998. The drones were still capable of being flown as crewed aircraft, such as for ferrying to a test; during the test they were flown uncrewed. The QF-106 replaced the QF-100 Super Sabre drone; the last shoot down of a QF-106 (57-2524) took place at Holloman AFB on 20 February 1997 after which the QF-106 was superseded by the QF-4S and QF-4E Phantom II drone.

=== NASA research and test aircraft ===
Six F-106s were retained by NASA for test purposes through 1998. An F-106B two-seat trainer was operated by NASA Langley Research Center between 1979 and 1991. This Delta Dart was used in research programs ranging from testing supersonic engines to improving maneuverability of fighters. Between 1980 and 1986 the aircraft was modified for the purpose of lightning strike research and became known as the Lightning Strike Plane and was struck 714 times without damage. On one hour-long flight at 38,000 feet (12,000 metres) in 1984, lightning struck the research aircraft 72 times. One significant modification was the replacement of the composite nose radome by a metallic radome. Although the maximum speed of the F-106 was Mach 2.3, during the lightning experiments it was flown at subsonic speeds into clouds at 300 knots (350 miles per hour; 560 kilometres per hour) from 5,000 to 40,000 feet (1,500 to 12,200 metres). The aircraft was equipped with optical sensors which consisted of a video camera and a light detector. Data acquisition was performed with 1980s state of the art digital waveform recorders.

==== Eclipse project ====
NASA used six drones in its Eclipse Project which ran from 1997 to 1998. The Dryden Flight Research Center supported project Eclipse which sought to demonstrate the feasibility of a reusable Aerotow-launch vehicle. The objective was to tow, inflight, a modified QF-106 aircraft with a C-141A transport aircraft. The test demonstrated the possibility of towing and launching a space launch vehicle from behind a tow plane.

=== The Cornfield Bomber ===
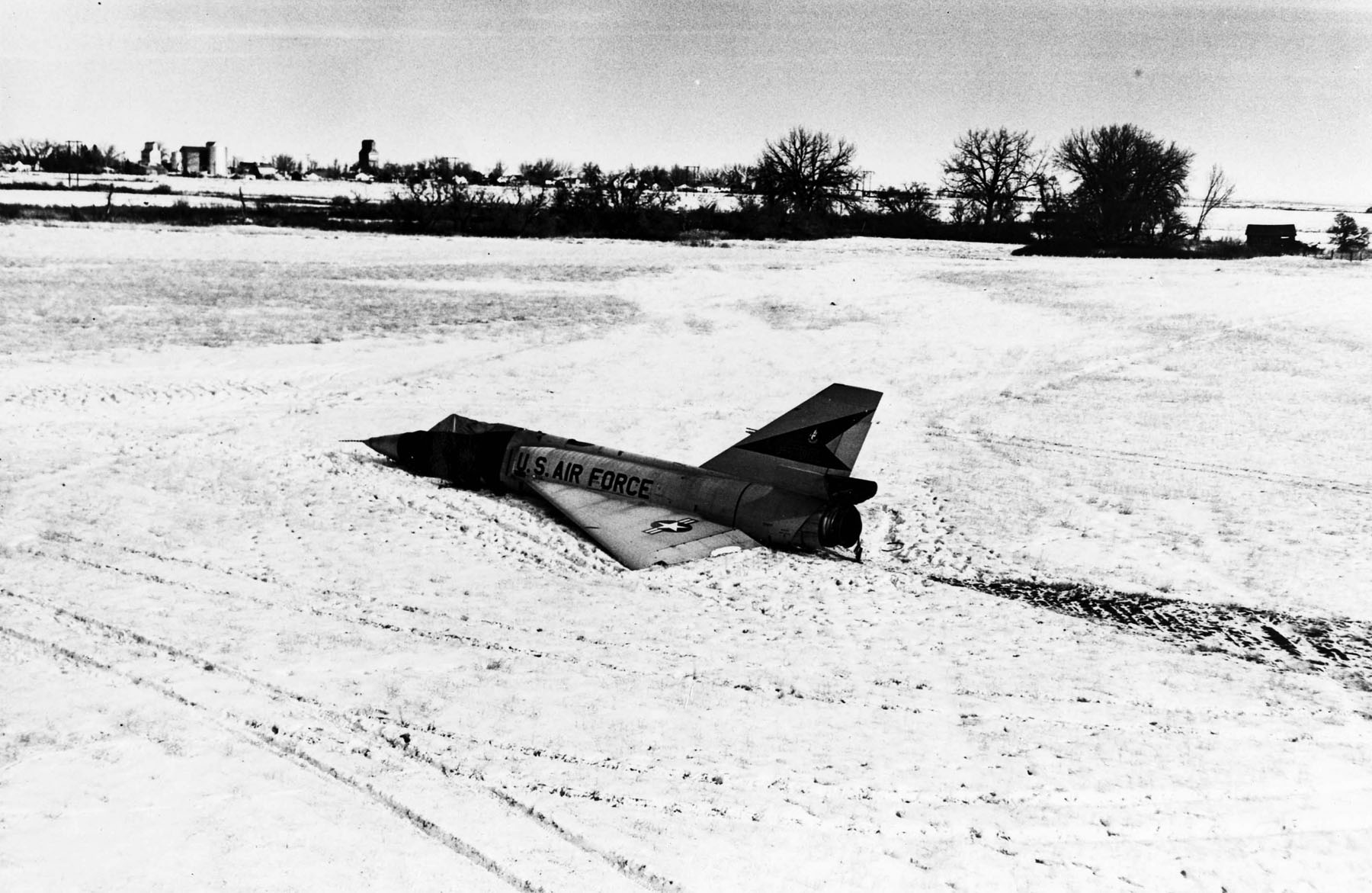
The Cornfield Bomber, pictured here shortly after earning its nickname

On 2 February 1970, an F-106 of the 71st Fighter-Interceptor Squadron, piloted by Captain Gary Foust, entered a flat spin over Montana. Foust followed procedures and ejected from the aircraft. The resulting change of balance caused the aircraft to stabilize and later belly land in a snow-covered field, suffering only minor damage. The aircraft, promptly nicknamed "The Cornfield Bomber", was then sent back to base by rail, repaired and returned to service, and is now on display at the National Museum of the United States Air Force.

== Variants ==
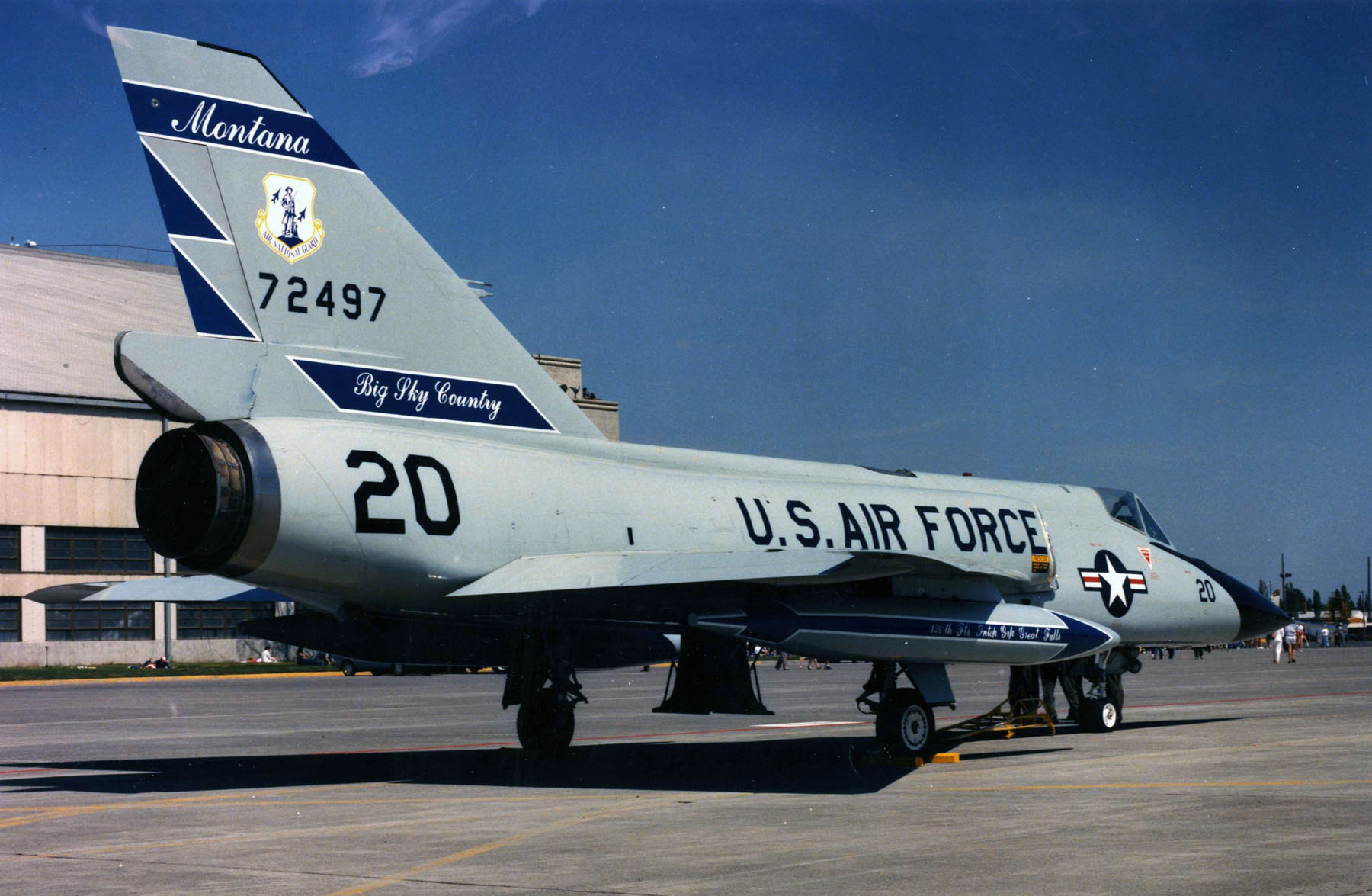
An F-106A of the Montana ANG viewed from the rear

- F-102B: The original designation of the F-106A.
- F-106A: (Convair Model 8-24) Improved version of the F-102. Fitted with the MA-1 Integrated Fire Control System with SAGE datalink, J-75 afterburning turbojet, enlarged intake, variable-geometry inlet ramps and shortened intake ducts, refined fuselage shape, modified wings and redesigned tailfin; tailpipe fitted with a device to reduce the tendency of the jet exhaust to blow unsecured objects around while taxiing, yet allowing virtually maximum performance at high thrust settings including afterburner. Performance was deemed unsatisfactory and modifications were made. The aircraft was capable of low supersonic speeds without afterburner (but with a significant range penalty) and had a maximum altitude at least 57,000 ft (17,000 m). Many were fitted with a conically cambered wing for improved takeoff, supersonic and high-altitude flight. To improve the aircraft's range the aircraft was fitted with two streamlined external supersonic tanks that still kept the aircraft capable of sustained roll rates of 100 degrees per second. Since these tanks produced virtually no significant performance degradation they were rarely jettisoned and were routinely carried around. After 1972, many F-106s were refitted with a new canopy featuring improved visibility, improved optic sights and provision for a gunpack in the center weapons bay.
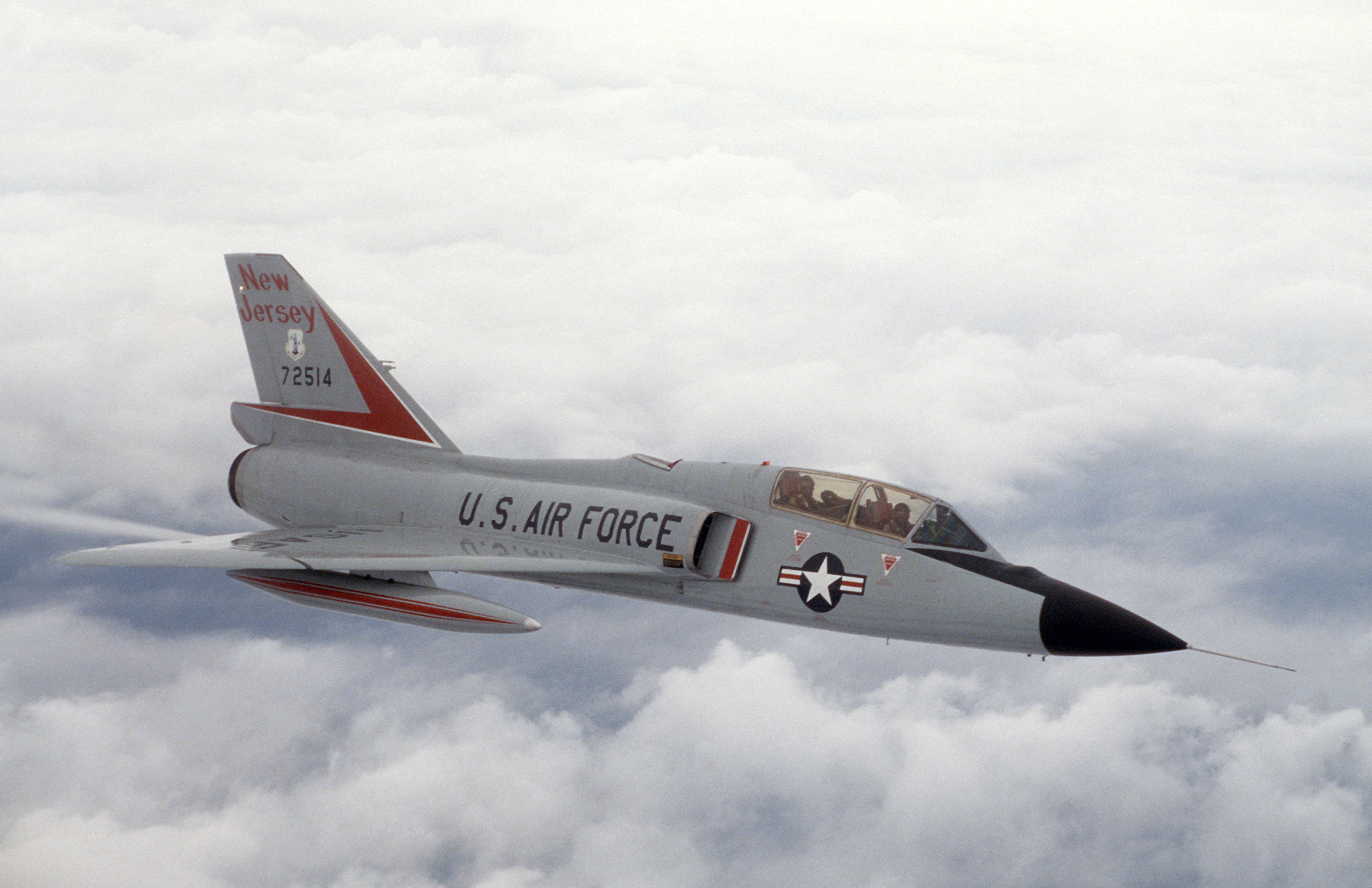
- A two-seat F-106B trainer variant of the New Jersey ANG
  F-106B: (Convair Model 8-27) Two-seat, combat-capable training version. Pilot and instructor are seated in tandem. Due to the extra seat, the fuselage is actually better area ruled; combined with a likely reduction in weight. (Note: It is uncertain if the F-106B was fitted with the modified "Project Sharpshooter" optic sights and gunpack provision.) Weapons configurations same as F-106A.
- NF-106B: This designation was given to two F-106Bs used as test aircraft with NASA and associated research facilities from 1966 to 1991.
- F-106C: Unbuilt version. Aircraft was intended to have the AN/ASG-18 radar and fire control system fitted originally developed for the North American XF-108 Rapier. For its time, it was the largest radar to ever be fitted to a fighter, actually requiring hydraulic actuators to turn the antenna. To accommodate this larger radar system, the nose cone was longer and of greater diameter. The design featured an improved raised canopy design featuring better visibility, canards and lengthened rectangular inlet ducts. The aircraft was to be capable of carrying one GAR-9/AIM-47A in its center bay and one AIM-26A in each side bay. At one time, the US Air Force had considered acquiring 350 of these advanced interceptors, but the F-106C/D project was cancelled on 23 September 1958. (Note: After the cancellation of the Avro Canada CF-105 Arrow, the Canadian government briefly considered purchasing the F-106C/D. After the F-106C/D project was canceled, it acquired McDonnell CF-101 Voodoos, instead.)
- F-106D: Unbuilt two-seat version of the F-106C.
- F-106X: Unbuilt version (early 1968). It would have been outfitted with canards and powered by a JT4B-22 turbojet. It was envisioned as an alternative to the Lockheed YF-12, and was to have had a fire control system with "look-down/shoot-down" capability fed by a 40-inch (102 cm) radar dish.
- F-106E: Unbuilt version. On 3 September 1968, Convair issued a proposal for an "improved" interceptor that was to be designated F-106E/F. It was to be compatible with the upcoming airborne warning and control systems as well as with the over-the-horizon radar defense network. The F-106E/F would have had a longer nose and a new and improved radar with a look-down/shoot-down tracking and missile launch capability. It would also have had a two-way UHF voice and datalink radio. It would have been capable of launching both nuclear and non-nuclear missiles, including the AIM-26 Nuclear Falcon and the AIM-47.
- F-106F: Unbuilt two-seat version of the F-106E.
- QF-106A: Converted into drones, were still capable of being flown both as crewed and uncrewed aircraft.
- F-106 RASCAL Project: Unbuilt version. It would have been a low cost satellite launcher.

== Operators ==
United States
United States Air Force

Air Defense Command / Aerospace Defense Command / Tactical Air Command

2nd Fighter-Interceptor Squadron – Wurtsmith AFB (1971–1972)
5th Fighter-Interceptor Squadron – Minot AFB (1960–1985)
11th Fighter-Interceptor Squadron – Duluth AFB (1960–1968)
27th Fighter-Interceptor Squadron – Loring AFB (1959–1971)
48th Fighter-Interceptor Squadron – Langley AFB (1960–1982)
49th Fighter-Interceptor Squadron – Griffiss AFB (1968–1987)
71st Fighter-Interceptor Squadron – Richards-Gebaur AFB (1960–1971)
83rd Fighter-Interceptor Squadron – Loring AFB (1971–1972)
84th Fighter-Interceptor Squadron – Hamilton AFB (1968–1973); Castle AFB (1973–1981)
87th Fighter-Interceptor Squadron – Duluth AFB (1968–1971); K.I. Sawyer AFB (1971–1985)

94th Fighter-Interceptor Squadron – Selfridge AFB (1960–1971)
95th Fighter-Interceptor Squadron – Andrews AFB (1959–1973)
318th Fighter Interceptor Squadron – McChord AFB (1960–1983)
319th Fighter-Interceptor Squadron – Bunker Hill AFB (1960–1963) / Grissom AFB (1971–1972)
329th Fighter-Interceptor Squadron – George AFB (1960–1967)
437th Fighter-Interceptor Squadron – Oxnard AFB (1968–1968)
438th Fighter-Interceptor Squadron – Kincheloe AFB (1960–1968)
456th Fighter-Interceptor Squadron – Castle AFB (1959–1968)
460th Fighter-Interceptor Squadron – Oxnard AFB (1968–1974)
498th Fighter-Interceptor Squadron – Geiger Field (1959–1963) McChord AFB (1963-1966) Paine Field (1966-1968) Hamilton AFB (1968)
539th Fighter-Interceptor Squadron – McGuire AFB (1959–1967)

Air National Guard

101st Fighter Interceptor Squadron, MA ANG – Otis ANGB (1972–1988)
119th Fighter Interceptor Squadron, NJ ANG – Atlantic City ANGB (1972–1988)
159th Fighter Interceptor Squadron, FL ANG – Jacksonville ANGB (1974–1987)
171st Fighter Interceptor Squadron, MI ANG – Selfridge ANGB (1972–1978)
186th Fighter Interceptor Squadron, MT ANG – Great Falls ANGB (1972–1987)
194th Fighter Interceptor Squadron, CA ANG – Fresno ANGB (1974–1984)

NASA

== Aircraft on display ==
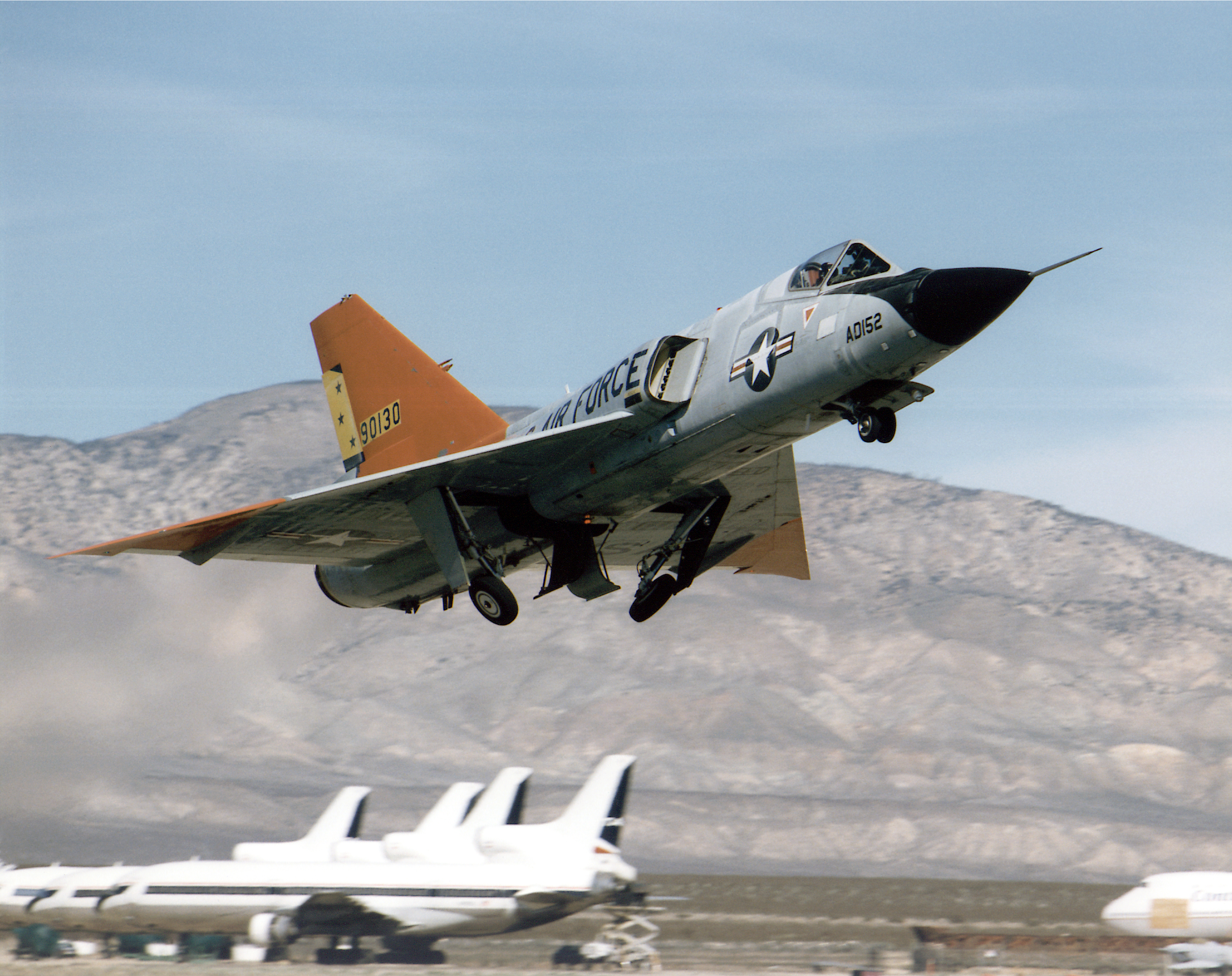
The QF-106 Delta Dart target drone

F-106A

- 56-0451 – Selfridge Military Air Museum, Selfridge Air National Guard Base, Michigan.
- 56-0454 – Holloman AFB, New Mexico.
- 56-0459 – McChord Air Museum, McChord AFB, Washington.
- 56-0460 – Minot AFB, North Dakota.
- 56-0461 – K. I. Sawyer AFB Heritage Air Museum at the former K. I. Sawyer AFB / now Sawyer International Airport, Marquette, Michigan.
- 57-0230 – 125th Fighter Wing, Jacksonville Air National Guard Base at Jacksonville International Airport, Florida.
- 58-0774 – Hill Aerospace Museum, Hill AFB, Utah.
- 58-0787 – National Museum of the United States Air Force, Wright-Patterson AFB, Dayton, Ohio. Nicknamed the "Cornfield Bomber", this F-106 landed itself with relatively minor damage in a farmer's field after its pilot lost control and ejected. It last served with the 49th Fighter Squadron before being brought to the museum in August 1986.
- 58-0793 – Castle Air Museum at the former Castle AFB, Atwater, California.
- 59-0003 – Pima Air & Space Museum, adjacent to Davis-Monthan AFB in Tucson, Arizona.
- 59-0010 – Aerospace Museum of California, McClellan Airfield (former McClellan AFB), Sacramento, California.
- 59-0023 – Air Mobility Command Museum, Dover AFB, Delaware.
- 59-0043 – 309th Aerospace Maintenance and Regeneration Group, Davis-Monthan AFB, Arizona.
- 59-0069 – Great Falls Air National Guard Base, Great Falls Airport, Montana.
- 59-0086 – Pacific Coast Air Museum, Santa Rosa, California.
- 59-0105 – Camp Blanding Museum, Camp Blanding Florida National Guard Joint Training Center, Middleburg, Florida.
- 59-0123 – Museum of Aviation, Robins AFB, Warner Robins, Georgia.
- 59-0134 – Peterson Air and Space Museum, Peterson AFB, Colorado Springs, Colorado.
- 59-0137 – Evergreen Aviation & Space Museum, McMinnville, Oregon.
- 59-0145 – Tyndall Air Park, Tyndall AFB, Florida.
- 59-0146 – 144th Fighter Wing, Fresno Air National Guard Base, Fresno, California.

F-106B

- 57-2509 – Palm Springs Air Museum, Palm Springs, California.
- 57-2513 – Yanks Air Museum, Chino, California.
- 57-2523 – Atlantic City Air National Guard Base, Atlantic City, New Jersey.
- 57-2533 – Kelly Field Heritage Museum, Lackland AFB/Kelly Field (former Kelly AFB), Texas.
- 59-0158 – Edwards AFB Century Circle, Edwards AFB, California.

NF-106B

- 57-2516 – Virginia Air and Space Center / Hampton History Center, Hampton, Virginia.

== Specifications (F-106A) ==
Convair F-106A Delta Dart 3-view drawings

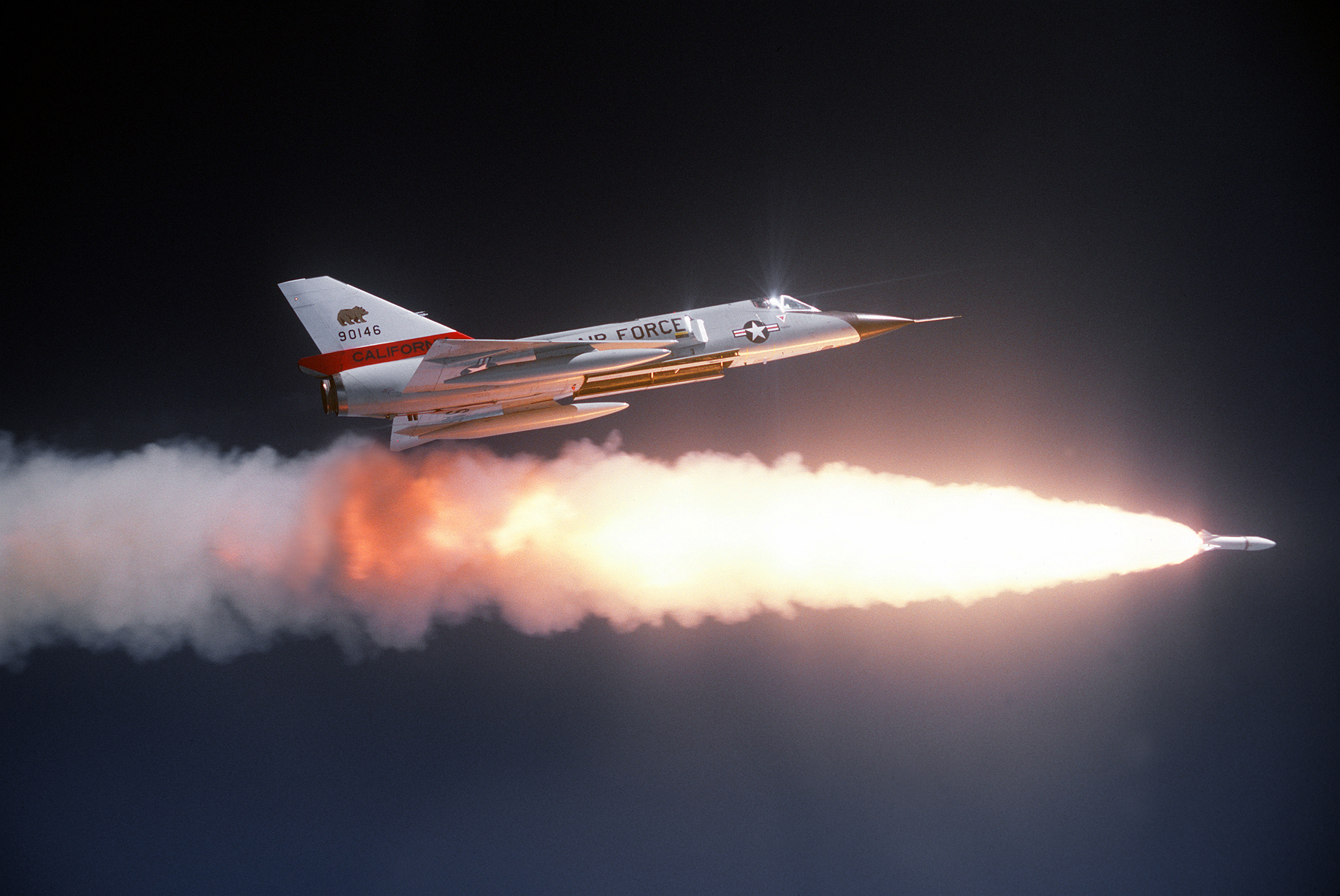
F-106A Delta Dart from California ANG fires an AIR-2 Genie

Data from Quest for Performance, Convair Deltas

General characteristics

- Crew: 1
- Length: 70 ft 8 in (21.55 m)
- Wingspan: 38 ft 3 in (11.67 m)
- Height: 20 ft 3 in (6.18 m)
- Wing area: 661.5 sq ft (61.46 m^{2}) Original Wing

695 sq ft (65 m^{2}) Conically-Cambered Wing

- Aspect ratio: 2.1
- Airfoil: NACA 0004-65 mod
- Empty weight: 24,420 lb (11,077 kg)
- Gross weight: 34,510 lb (15,653 kg)
- Powerplant: 1 × Pratt & Whitney J75-P-17 afterburning turbojet engine, 16,100 lbf (72 kN) thrust dry, 24,500 lbf (109 kN) with afterburner

Performance

- Maximum speed: 1,325 kn (1,525 mph, 2,454 km/h) at 40,000 ft (12,200 m)
- Maximum speed: Mach 2.3
- Combat range: 1,335 nmi (1,536 mi, 2,472 km) with internal fuel
- Ferry range: 2,346 nmi (2,700 mi, 4,345 km) with external tanks at 530 kn (610 mph; 982 km/h) at 41,000 ft (12,500 m)
- Service ceiling: 57,000 ft (17,000 m)
- g limits: +7, -3
- Rate of climb: 29,000 ft/min (150 m/s)
- Time to altitude: 52,000 ft (16,000 m) in six minutes and 54 seconds
- Lift-to-drag: 12.1 (Subsonic, est.)
- Wing loading: 52 lb/sq ft (250 kg/m^{2})
- Thrust/weight: 0.71

Armament

- Guns: 1 × 20 mm caliber M61A1 Vulcan 6-barreled rotary cannon (Available after 1972 refit)
- Missiles: 2 × AIM-4F Falcon and 2 × AIM-4G Falcon
  - 1 × AIR-2A Genie nuclear-armed rocket (Not available later with M61A1)

Avionics

- Hughes MA-1 AWCS - weapon system

== See also ==
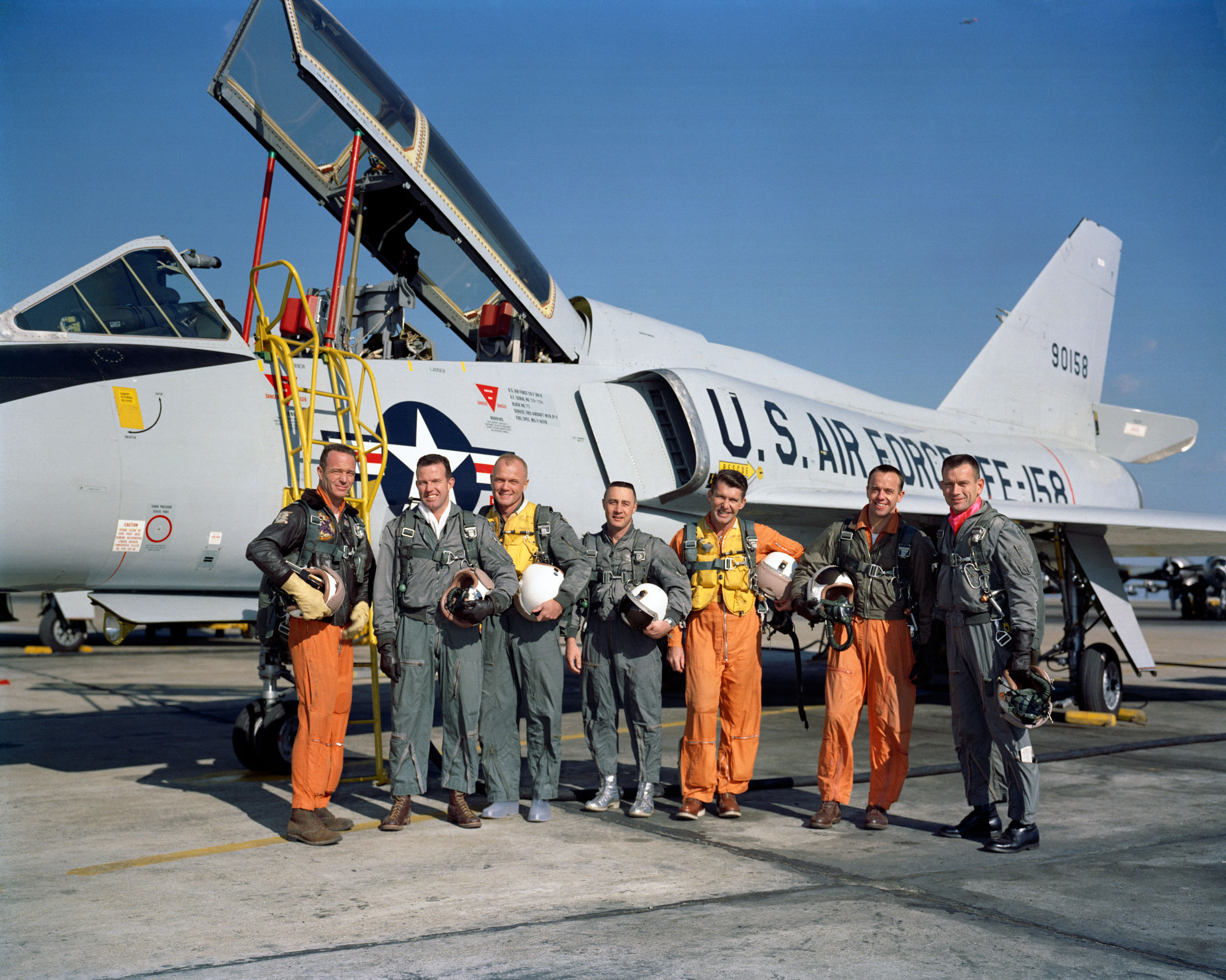
The Mercury Seven stand in front of an F-106B

- Century Series
- Sky Scorcher

Related development

- Convair XF-92
- Convair F-102 Delta Dagger
- Convair Kingfish

Aircraft of comparable role, configuration, and era

- Avro Canada CF-105 Arrow – (Canada)
- Dassault Mirage III – (France)
- English Electric Lightning – (United Kingdom)
- Mikoyan-Gurevich MiG-21 – (Soviet Union) / Chengdu J-7 – (China)
- Saab 35 Draken – (Sweden)
- Sukhoi Su-9 / Su-11 – (Soviet Union)
- Sukhoi Su-15 – (Soviet Union)

Related lists

- List of fighter aircraft
- List of military aircraft of the United States
