= 194th Fighter Squadron =

194th Fighter Squadron

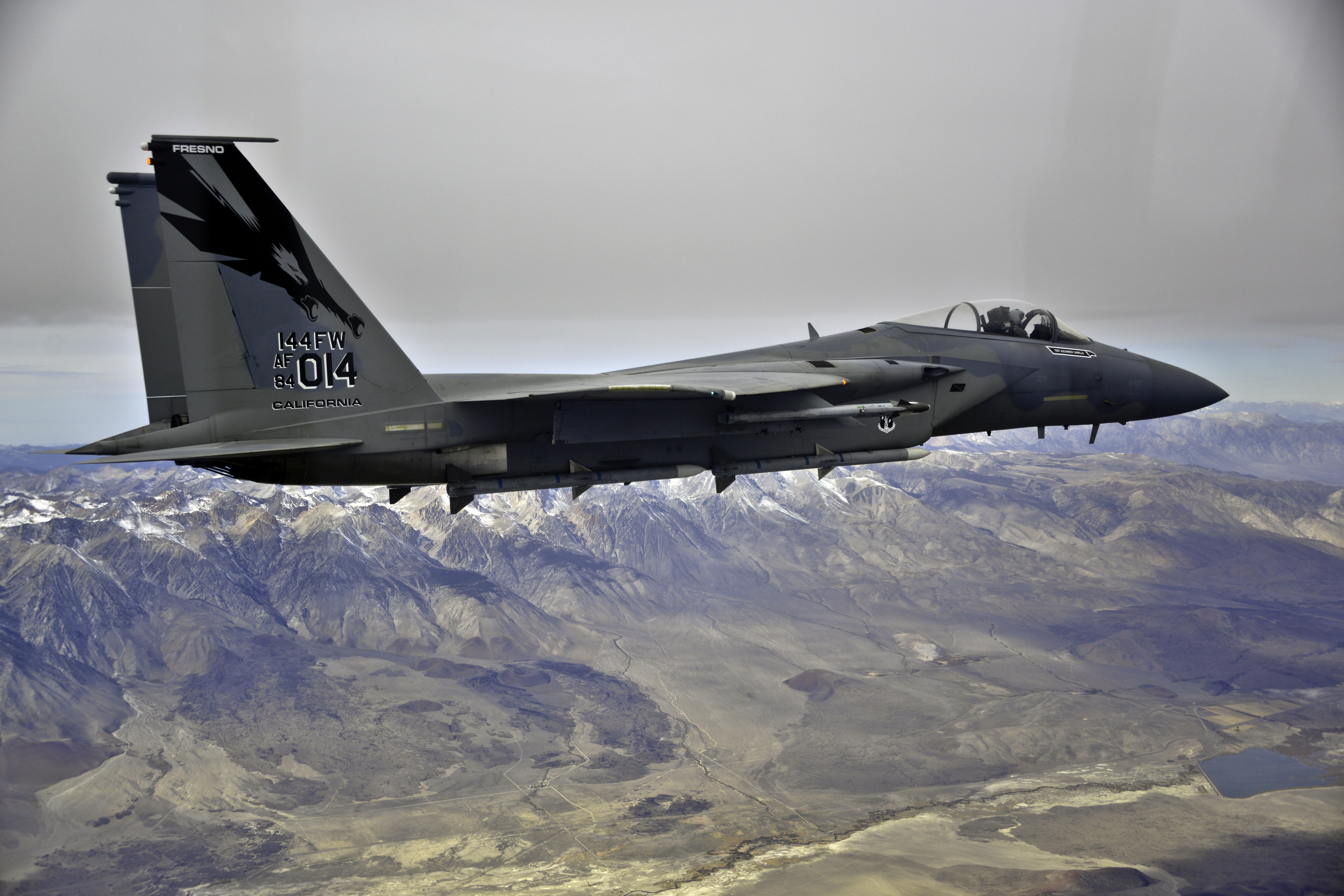
- 194th FS F-15C Eagle 84-0014 in flight over the skies of Fresno, California.
- Active: 1943–1945; 1948–present
- Country: United States
- Allegiance: California
- Branch: Air National Guard
- Type: Squadron
- Role: Fighter/Air Defense
- Part of: California Air National Guard
- Garrison/HQ: Fresno Air National Guard Base, California
- Nickname: "Griffins"

Commanders
- Current commander: Lt. Col. Jon Vanbragt

Insignia
- 194th Fighter Squadron
- Tail stripe: Blue with "Fresno"

The 194th Fighter Squadron , nicknamed the Griffins, is a unit of the California Air National Guard's 144th Fighter Wing at Fresno Air National Guard Base, California. The 194th is equipped with the McDonnell Douglas F-15C/D Eagle and like its parent wing, the 144th, is operationally-gained within the active U.S. Air Force by the Air Combat Command (ACC). It is scheduled to convert to the Boeing F-15EX Eagle II in the future.

== History ==
=== World War II ===
Activated in October 1943 as the 409th Fighter Squadron at Hamilton Field, California. During World War II, the squadron was an Operational Training Unit (OTU), equipped with second-line Bell P-39 Airacobras and Curtiss P-40 Warhawks. Its mission was to train newly graduated pilots from Training Command in combat tactics and maneuvers before being assigned to their permanent combat unit. Initially assigned to IV Fighter Command, then transferred to III Fighter Command in 1944, being re-equipped with P-51D Mustangs. It took part in air-ground maneuvers and demonstrations, participating in the Louisiana Maneuvers in the summer of 1944 and in similar activities in the US until after V-J Day.

Inactivated in November 1945.

=== California Air National Guard ===
==== Early Years (1946–1950) ====
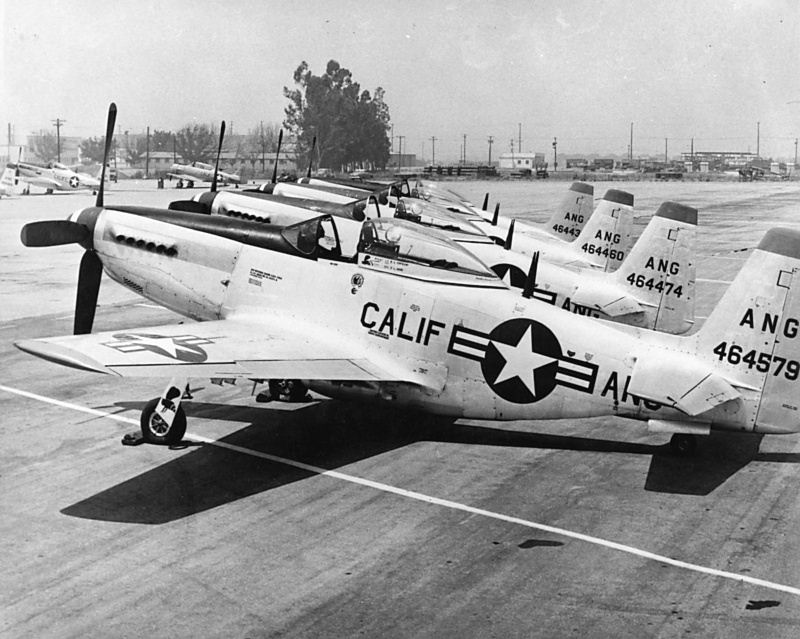
194th Fighter Squadron – North American F-51Hs at Hayward Air National Guard Base, California, 1949.

The 409th Squadron was redesignated as the 194th Fighter Squadron, and allotted to the National Guard, on 24 May 1946. It was organized at Naval Air Station Alameda, California, and was extended federal recognition. The 194th Fighter Squadron was equipped with North American P-51D/H Mustangs (later redesignated as F-51) and was assigned to the 144th Fighter Group.

=== Air Defense (1950–1989) ===
==== F-51D/H Mustang (1950–1954) ====
With the surprise invasion of South Korea on 25 June 1950, and the regular military's lack of readiness, most of the Air National Guard was federalized placed on active duty. However, the 194th was not mobilized. On 1 October 1952, the 194th Fighter Squadron was redesignated as the 194th Fighter-Interceptor Squadron.

In March 1953, the 194th Fighter-Bomber Squadron participated, along with the 138th Fighter-Interceptor Squadron (New York ANG), in a secret experiment to see if the Air National Guard was capable of performing air intercept missions. The experiment, brainchild of Major General George G. Finch, was to place two F-51D Mustang and five pilots on a five-minute alert from one hour before sunrise to one hour after sunset. The experiment was deemed a great success, with the five minute alert becoming permanent in August 1954.

During its years flying the F-51D/H, the unit earned prominence as one of the Air Force's most respected aerial gunnery competitors. In June 1953, while still flying the Mustang, the unit qualified for the first all-jet, worldwide gunnery meet, having to borrow North American F-86A Sabres to participate – the 194th finished in fifth place. The last Mustangs left Fresno by 31 October 1954.

==== F-86 Sabre (1954–1964) ====
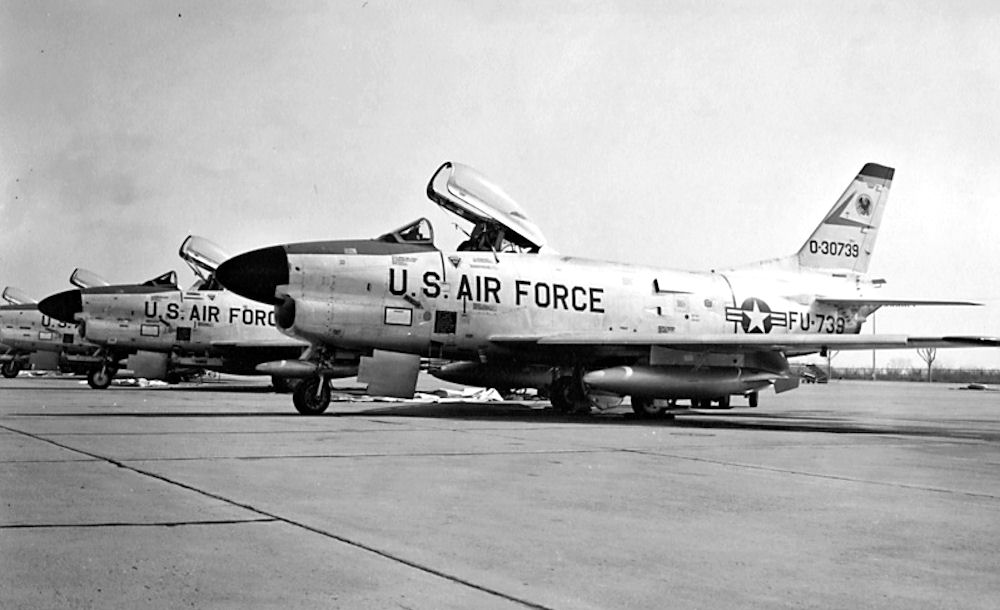
194th FIS F-86L Sabre Interceptor 53–0739, 1960

With the increased availability of jet aircraft after the Korean War, the squadron's aircraft were upgraded from the piston-engine, propeller driven Mustangs to its first jet aircraft, the North American F-86A Sabre on 1 November 1954. At the same time, the 194th relocated to Fresno Yosemite International Airport (known at the time as Fresno Air Terminal), followed by the wing in 1957. On 7 July 1955, the 194th was re-designated as the 194th Fighter-Interceptor Squadron, a designation kept by the squadron for the next 37 years.

In May 1957, the 194th FIS, alongside other ANG squadrons, participated in atomic bomb tests in Nevada known as Operation Plumbbob. It saw the ANG squadrons fly through mushroom clouds to collect radioactive samples, with the purpose of the training deemed as preparing the ANG to track radioactive clouds and report danger areas in the event of nuclear war.

On 1 April 1958, the Griffins transitioned to the F-86L Sabre, which was designed from the onset as an interceptor, had all-weather capability and was able to be used in all weather. In addition, the F-86L could be controlled and directed by the SAGE computer-controlled Ground Control Interceptor (Radar) sites which would vector the aircraft to the unidentified target for interception.

The 194th FIS disposed of its F-86Ls from late 1964 through to December 1964, with the Sabres being flown to Davis–Monthan Air Force Base for storage. One of the last jets scheduled to leave, 53-0642, suffered a technical issue and could not depart, instead becoming a gate guard at Fresno.

==== F-102 Delta Dagger (1964–1974) ====
On 1 July 1964, the 194th FIS conversion to the Convair F-102A Delta Dagger was approved, with the first F-102 arriving on 6 July. The 194th FIS continued flying to F-102 up until July 1974.

==== F-106 Delta Dart (1974–1983) ====
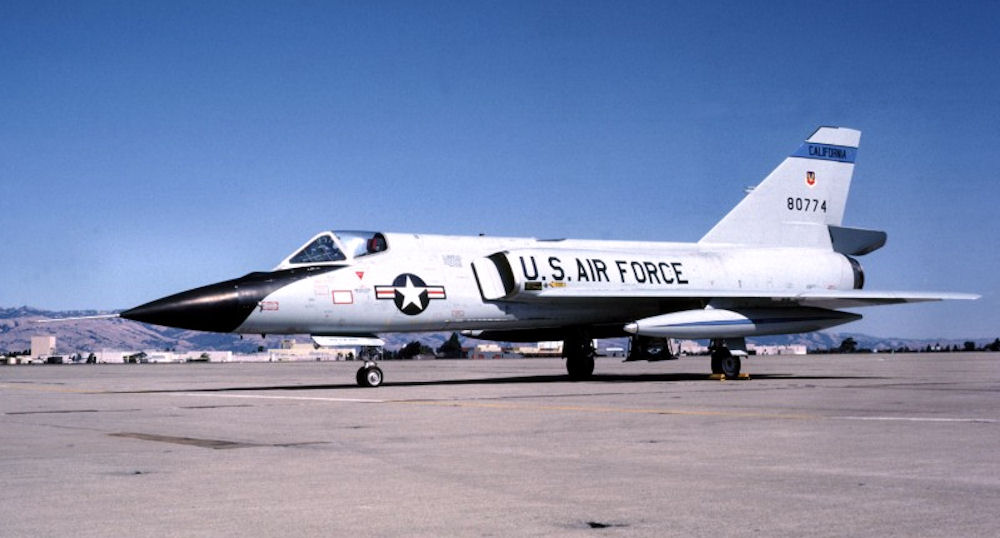
194th Fighter-Interceptor Squadron – Convair F-106A-100-CO Delta Dart 58–0774, 1975

On 25 July 1974, the 194th FIS converted to the Convair F-106A/B Delta Dart. On 1 October 1978, Aerospace Defense Command was inactivated, its units being reassigned to Air Defense, Tactical Air Command (ADTAC). which was established compatible to a Numbered Air Force under Tactical Air Command (TAC).

The Griffins participated in the 1980 William Tell Weapons Meet where they finished as the overall winner of the competition, receiving the Gen. Daniel “Chappie” James Jr. Fighter Interceptor Team award being the top team. In January 1981, the 194th FIS started a Det. 1 alert detachment at George Air Force Base, taking on Quick Reaction Alert responsibilities. The 194th FIS also took part in the 1982 William Tell Weapons Meet, with Lt. Col. Robert Boehringer of the 194th FIS finishing as the 'Top Gun' out of all the F-106 teams.

Between September and December 1983, the 194th FIS maintained a Det. 1 alert detachment at Castle Air Force Base, California, taking over from the 318th Fighter-Interceptor Squadron while they converted from the F-106 to the McDonnell Douglas F-15A/B Eagle. With the end of the detachment, the 194th FIS ended operations on the F-106 on 31 December 1983.

==== F-4D Phantom II (1983–1989) ====
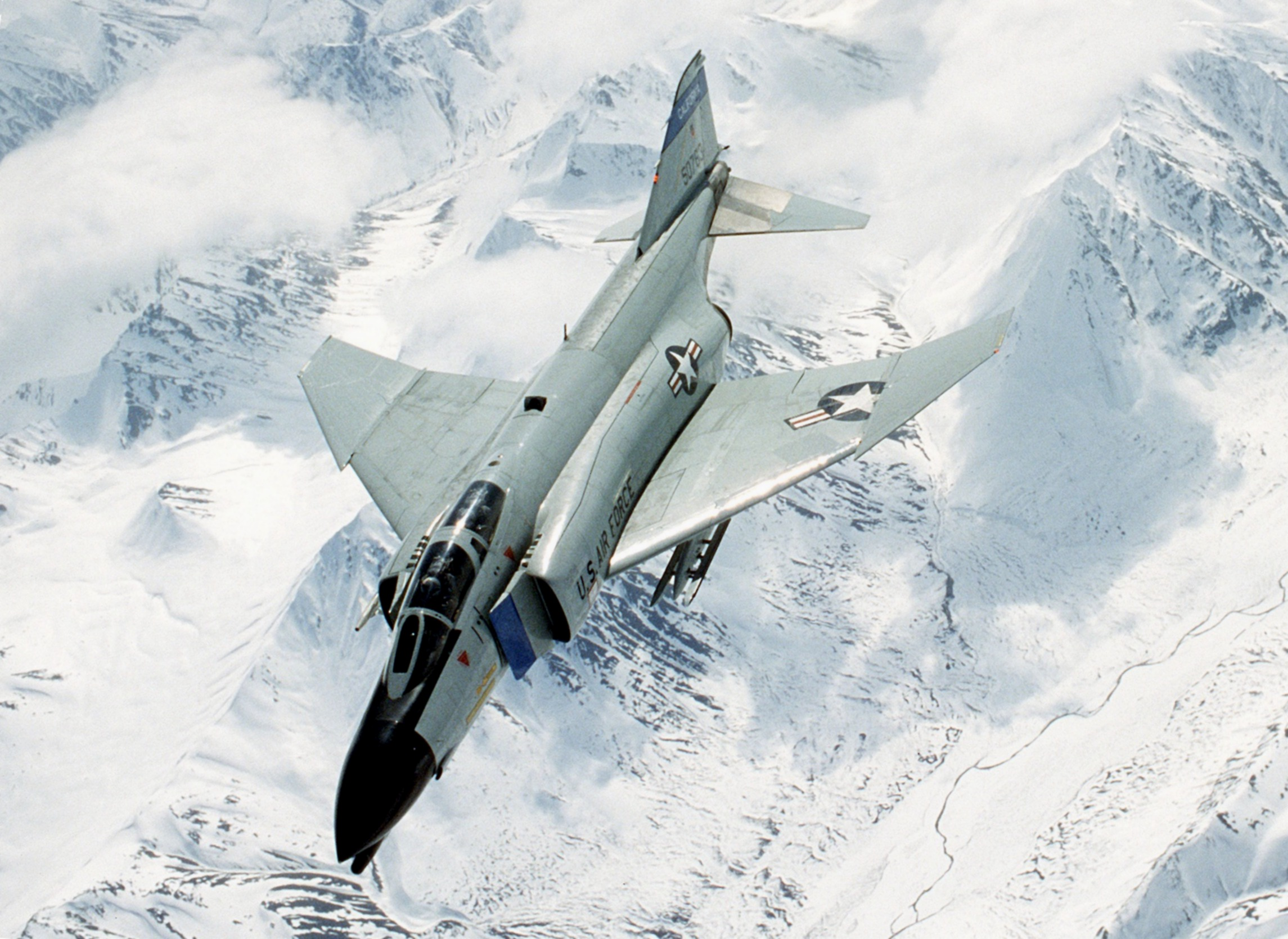
194th FIS F-4D Phantom II 65-0763 in flight, 1987

In 1983, the 194th FIS began to convert to the McDonnell Douglas F-4D Phantom II, with their first F-4D arriving at Fresno on 2 October 1983.

Between March 1986 and April 1987, the 194th FIS deployed three F-4Ds (65-0583, 65-0740 and 65-0747) to Ramstein Air Base, West Germany, alongside the 178th FIS and 179th FIS as part of Exercise Creek Klaxon. The three ANG squadrons were deployed to provide air defense alert while the resident 86th Tactical Fighter Wing converted from the F-4E Phantom II to the General Dynamics F-16C/D Fighting Falcon.

The Griffins flew their last F-4D Phantom II sortie on 30 June 1989, launching a four-ship of F-4Ds which undertook a training mission with F-15s and Boeing B-52 Stratofortresses before conducting a flypast over Fresno and recovering for the last time. Due to the conversion to the single seat F-16, the back-seat WSOs either retrained to fly the Fighting Falcon, relocated to the 192nd Tactical Reconnaissance Squadron (Nevada ANG) or transferred to non-flying positions. Meanwhile, the withdrawn Phantom IIs were either sent to other Air National Guard squadrons or were stored at AMARC. Between July and October 1989, the 179th FIS (Minnesota ANG) maintained an alert detachment during the 194th's conversion to the F-16.

=== F-16 Fighting Falcon (1989–2013) ===
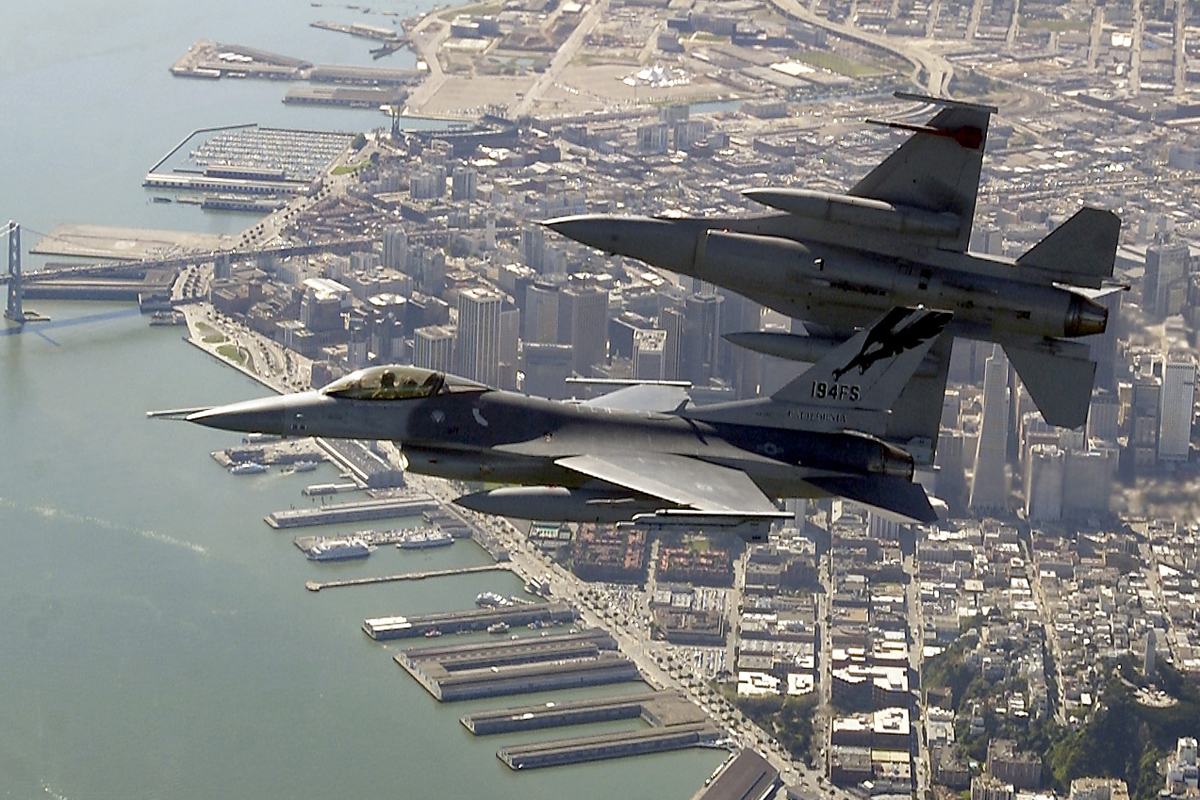
194th Fighter Squadron F-16s over San Francisco, 2004

The 194th FIS received their first General Dynamics F-16A Fighting Falcon (Block 15) on 10 April 1989, with the jet arriving from Nellis Air Force Base, Nevada. The 194th FIS conducted their first F-16 sorties in July 1989. The squadron's transition was fully completed by October 1989, with the original plan having been to convert to the F-16 between 1990 and 1991. Replacing the F-4D in the air defense and attack roles, the Block 15 F-16A/B airframes weren't initially suited to the dedicated air defense mission the squadron was tasked to. This was fixed with the Air Defense Fighter (ADF) upgrade these aircraft received during 1990, which included the addition of a Clear Weather Intercept module on the AN/APG-66 radar and an Advanced Identification Friend or Foe system.

On 16 March 1992, the 144th Fighter-Interceptor Wing was redesignated as the 144th Fighter Wing (144th FW), with the 194th becoming the 194th Fighter Squadron. On 1 June 1992, the 144th FW was reassigned to Air Combat Command. On 15 June 1992, the 194th's Det. 1 alert detachment at George AFB relocated to March Air Force Base due to the impending closure of George AFB. In 1995, the squadron transitioned to the F-16C/D Fighting Falcon block 25 aircraft.

As part of Operation Southern Watch, the 194th FS deployed to Prince Sultan Air Base, Saudi Arabia, between December 2002 and May 2003.

After having flown for 11 years with the Block 25 airframes, a number of those came to the end of their operational lifespan. It was therefore decided that the airframes of the 194th FS were to be replaced with F-16C Block 32 aircraft. The conversion to these block 32 models started in December 2006 and was gradually completed by the end of 2007.

=== F-15 Eagle (2013–present) ===
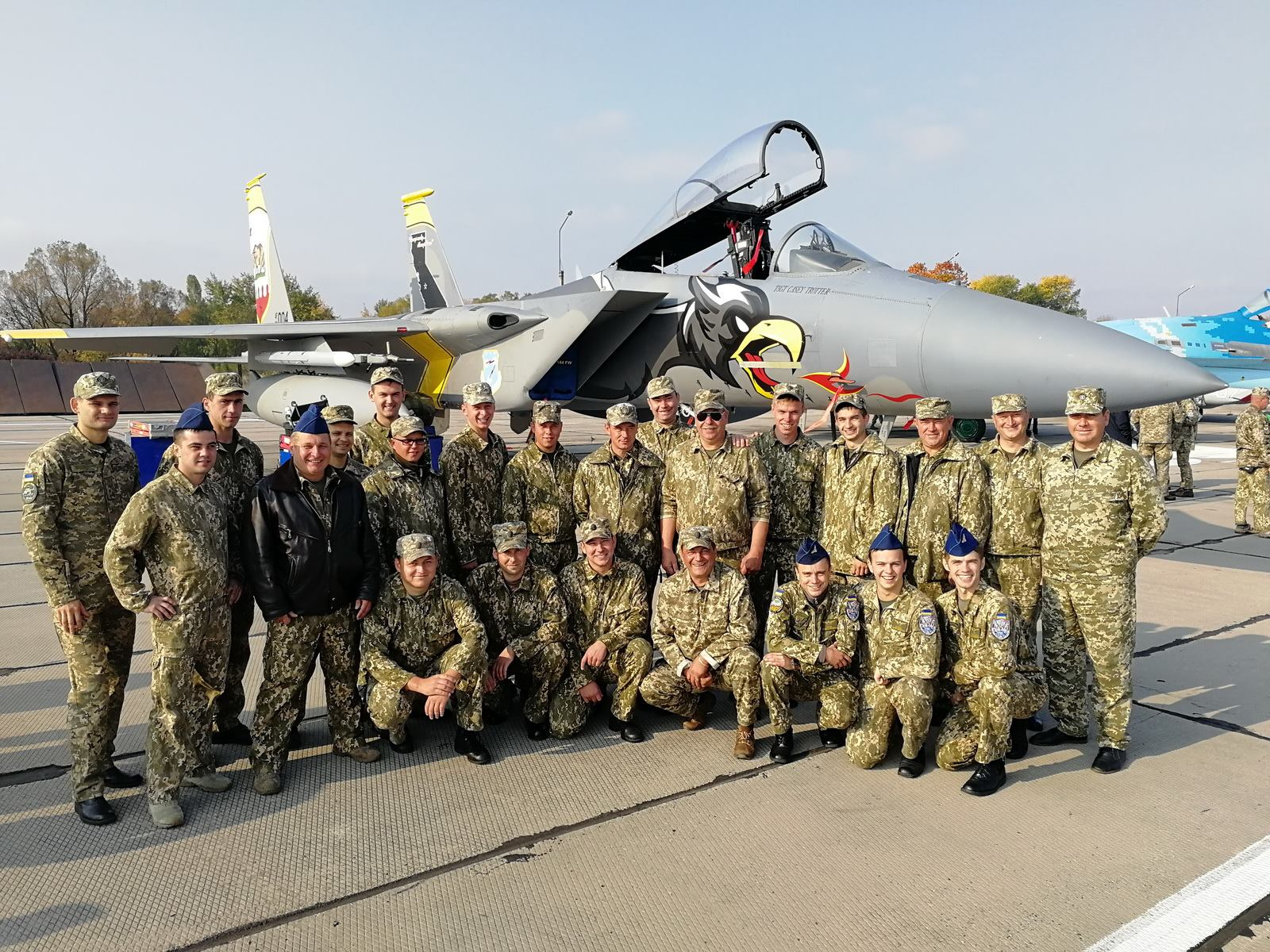
Ukrainian pilots in front of 194th FS heritage jet F-15C 84-0004, 2019

==== F-15C/D ====
The 194th Fighter Squadron started the conversion process to the McDonnell Douglas F-15C/D Eagle with the arrival of F-15C 84-0014, the first of 21 F-15s, on 18 June 2013. The 194th FS received their Eagles from the 186th Fighter Squadron (Montana ANG) and the 65th Aggressor Squadron, with the last three F-15Cs arriving at Fresno from Great Falls ANGB on 24 October 2013. The last F-16 departed the 194th Fighter Squadron on 7 November 2013, destined for 162nd Fighter Wing of the Arizona Air National Guard.

In October 2018, the 194th FS deployed six F-15Cs to Starokostiantyniv Air Base, Ukraine, as part of Clear Sky 2018, becoming the first American unit to land Eagles in Ukraine. The Griffins borrowed an F-15D from the 493rd Fighter Squadron at RAF Lakenheath, United Kingdom, for the duration of the exercise due to not deploying their own two-seat D model. On 16 October 2018, Lt. Col. Seth ‘Jethro’ Nehring of the 194th FS died in a crash in Sukhoi Su-27UB1M (Blue 70) while on a familiarization flight with Col. Ivan Petrenko of the Ukrainian Air Force. In September 2019, six Ukrainian pilots and a translator deployed to Fresno ANGB to conduct familiarization flights with the Eagle.

Due to the 18th Wing at Kadena Air Base, Japan, divesting its fleet of F-15C/Ds, the 194th FS deployed to Kadena AB in October 2023 to help maintain a continuous fighter presence at the base.

==== F-15EX ====
It was announced in 2023 that the 194th Fighter Squadron would replace the F-15C/D Eagle with the updated Boeing F-15EX Eagle II. However, with the announcement in April 2025 that the 107th Fighter Squadron, Michigan ANG, would now be receiving the F-15EX the timeline for deliveries to the 194th FS has been delayed.

=== Lineage ===
- Constituted 409th Fighter Squadron on 12 October 1943

Activated on 15 October 1943
Redesignated 409th Fighter-Bomber Squadron on 5 April 1944
Redesignated 409th Fighter Squadron on 5 June 1944
Inactivated on 7 November 1945

- Redesignated 194th Fighter Squadron, and allocated to the National Guard on 24 May 1946

Extended federal recognition on 25 June 1948
Redesignated 194th Fighter-Interceptor Squadron on 1 October 1952
Redesignated 194th Fighter-Bomber Squadron on 1 December 1952
Redesignated 194th Fighter-Interceptor Squadron on 7 July 1955
Redesignated 194th Fighter Squadron on 16 March 1992

=== Assignments ===
- 372d Fighter (Later Fighter-Bomber, Fighter) Group, 15 October 1943 – 7 November 1945
- 144th Fighter Group (later 144th Fighter-Interceptor Group, 144th Fighter-Bomber Group, 144th Fighter-Interceptor Group, 144th Fighter Group, 144th Fighter-Interceptor Group, 25 June 1948
- 144th Fighter-Interceptor Wing, 1 July 1976
- 144th Operations Group, 16 March 1992 – present

=== Stations ===
- Hamilton Field, California, 15 October 1943
- Portland Army Air Base, Oregon, 7 December 1943
- Esler Field, Louisiana, 25 March 1944
- Pollock Army Air Field, Louisiana, 15 April 1944
- Esler Field, Louisiana, 9 February 1945
- Alexandria Army Air Base, Louisiana, 14 September – 7 November 1945
- Naval Air Station Alameda, California, 25 June 1948
- Hayward Air National Guard Base, California, 1949
- Fresno Yosemite International Airport (later Fresno Air National Guard Base), California, 1954

Det. 1: George Air Force Base, California, January 1981 – 26 June 1992
Det. 1: Castle Air Force Base, California, September 1983 – December 1983
Det. 1: March Air Force Base, California, 26 June 1992 – present

=== Aircraft ===
- Bell P-39 Airacobra, 1943–1944
- Curtiss P-40 Warhawk, 1944–1945
- North American P-51D Mustang, 1945
- North American F-51D/H Mustang, 1948–1954
- North American F-86A Sabre, 1954–1958
- North American F-86L Sabre, 1958–1964
- Convair F-102A/TF-102A Delta Dagger, 1965–1974
- Convair F-106A/B Delta Dart, 1974–1983
- McDonnell F-4D Phantom II, 1983–1989
- General Dynamics F-16A/B Fighting Falcon Block 15, 1989–1995
- General Dynamics F-16C/D Fighting Falcon Block 25, 1995–2007
- General Dynamics F-16C/D Fighting Falcon Block 32, 2006–2013
- McDonnell Douglas F-15C/D Eagle, 2013–present
