= Montana National Guard =

Two service branches in United States

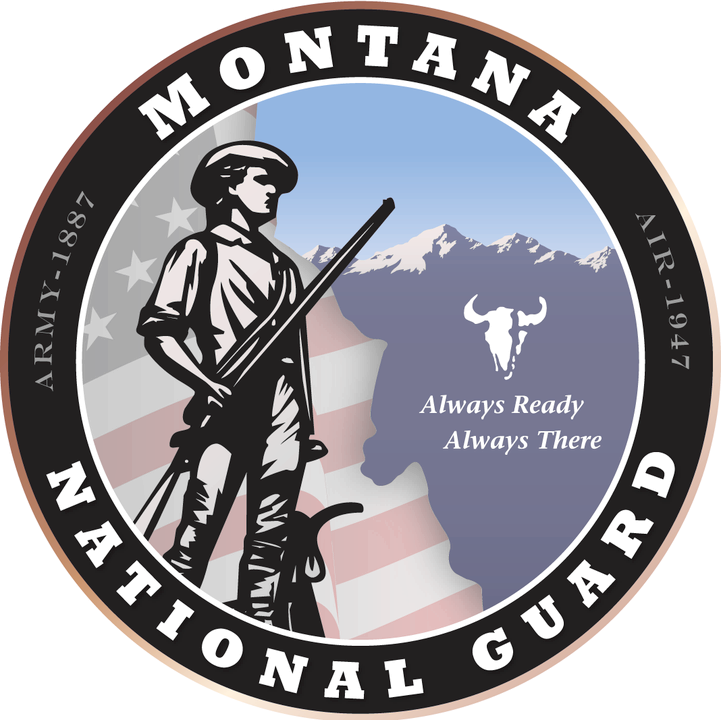
Montana National Guard logo

The Montana National Guard consists of the Montana Army National Guard and the Montana Air National Guard.

== Structure and mission ==
When National Guard troops are called to federal service, the president serves as commander-in-chief. The federal mission assigned to the National Guard is: "To provide properly trained and equipped units for prompt mobilization for war, National emergency or as otherwise needed."

The governor may call individuals or units of the Montana National Guard into state service during emergencies or to assist in special situations which lend themselves to use of the National Guard. The state mission assigned to the National Guard is: "To provide trained and disciplined forces for domestic emergencies or as otherwise provided by state law."

Montana Air National Guard units include the 120th Fighter Wing and the 219th RED HORSE Squadron.
