= 186th Airlift Squadron =

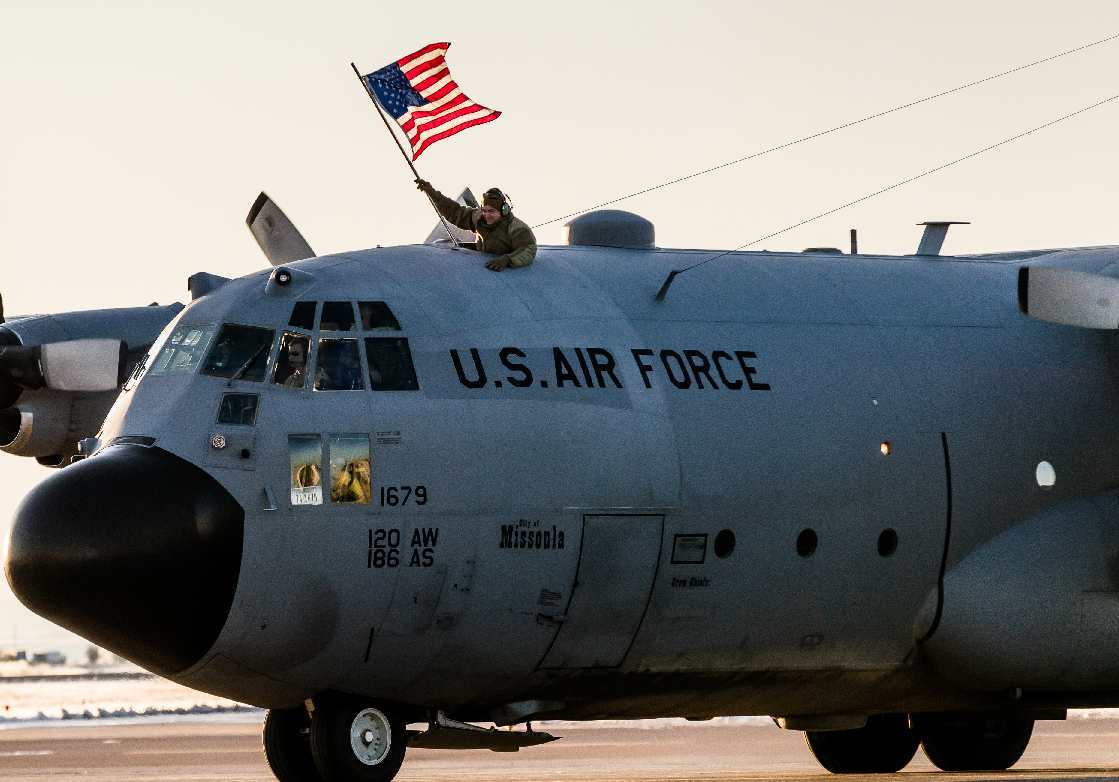
- Montana Guardsmen return from deployment in 2019
- Active: 1943–1945; 1947–1953; 1953–present
- Country: United States
- Branch: Air National Guard
- Type: Squadron
- Role: Airlift
- Part of: Montana Air National Guard
- Garrison/HQ: Gore Field Air National Guard Base, Montana
- Nickname: Vigilantes
- Engagements: European Theater of Operations
- Decorations: Distinguished Unit Citation; Air Force Outstanding Unit Award Cited in the Belgian Army Order of the Day

Insignia
- 186th Airlift Squadron Unit emblem (Note: Originally approved for the 186th Fighter-Interceptor Squadron.)

The 186th Airlift Squadron is a unit of the Montana Air National Guard 120th Airlift Wing located at Great Falls International Airport (Air National Guard Base), Montana. The 186th was equipped with the C-130H Hercules until October 2026, and are transitioning to the C-130J Super Hercules.

== History ==
=== World War II ===
The 404th Fighter Squadron was activated at Richmond Army Air Base, Virginia in the summer of 1943 as one of the three original squadrons of the 371st Fighter Group. The squadron trained in the northeastern United States with Republic P-47 Thunderbolts under First Air Force before moving overseas in the spring of 1944.

Upon arriving in England, the squadron became an element of Ninth Air Force at Bisterne Close, England. The squadron's first combat operation was a fighter sweep over Occupied France. Prior to Operation Overlord, the invasion of Normandy, the 404th flew fighter sweeps, dive bombing and escort missions.

On D-Day, 6 June 1944, the squadron patrolled the beachhead. attacking railroads, trains, vehicles. gun emplacements and other targets. Soon after the invasion, the squadron moved to France and participated in the air interdiction that preceded the Allied breakout at St Lo in late July and supported the following drive across northern France. It continued to operate in northeastern France and southwestern Germany through the winter of 1945, attacking storage dumps, marshalling yard, factories, bridges, roads, and vehicles. In December 1944 it provided close air support for ground forces engaged in the Battle of the Bulge.

The squadron was awarded a Distinguished Unit Citation for its attacks between 15 and 21 March 1945 that contributed to the defeat of Axis forces in southern Germany. It continued combat operations until the Surrender of Germany in May. The squadron remained with the occupation forces in Germany and Austria until October 1945 when it returned to the United States and was inactivated.

=== Montana Air National Guard ===
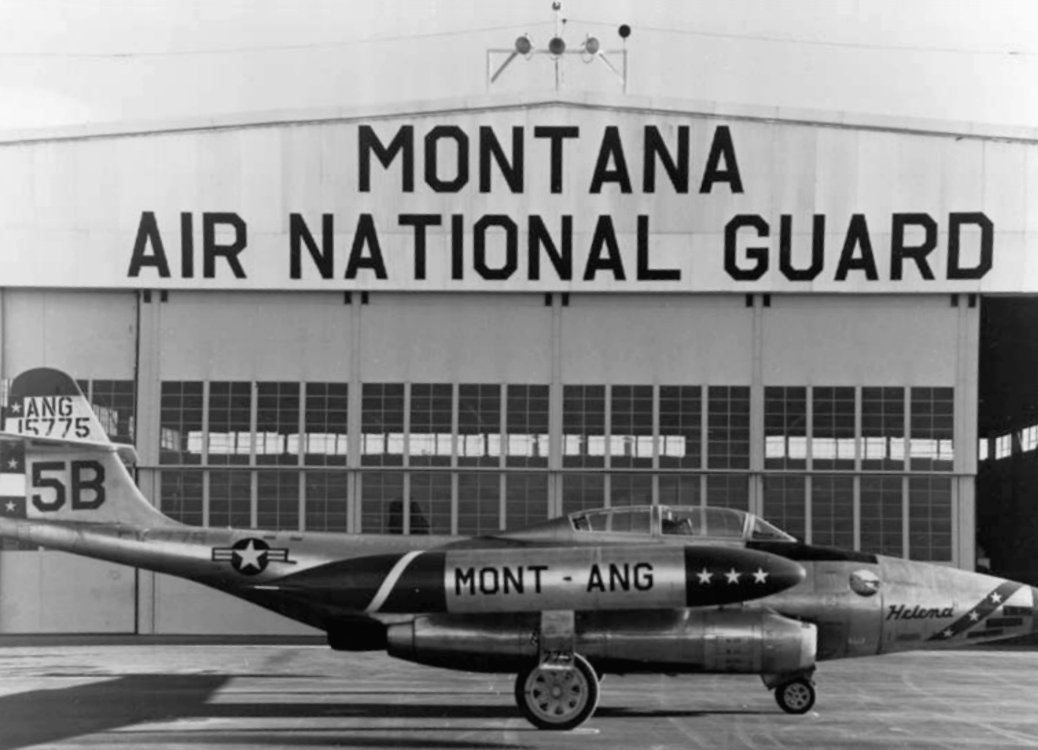
Northrop F-89C Scorpion 51-5775, about 1957

The wartime 404th Fighter Squadron was redesignated as the 186th Fighter Squadron, and was allotted to the Montana National Guard, on 24 May 1946. It was organized at Gore Field, Great Falls, Montana and was extended federal recognition on 27 June 1947. The squadron was equipped with F-51D Mustangs and was allotted to the Fourth Air Force, Continental Air Command by the National Guard Bureau.

Within two weeks of its activation six F-51Ds arrived. As part of the Continental Air Command Fourth Air Force, the unit trained for tactical bombing missions and air-to-air combat. Eighty-nine days after activation, tragedy struck the fledgling unit. En route to pick up the adjutant general in Helena, the A-26 Invader Lt. Col. Sperry was flying went down in a heavy snowstorm. The wreckage could not be found until the following summer. Aboard also was Sgt. Charles Glover, for whom the street along the east side of building 64 is named.

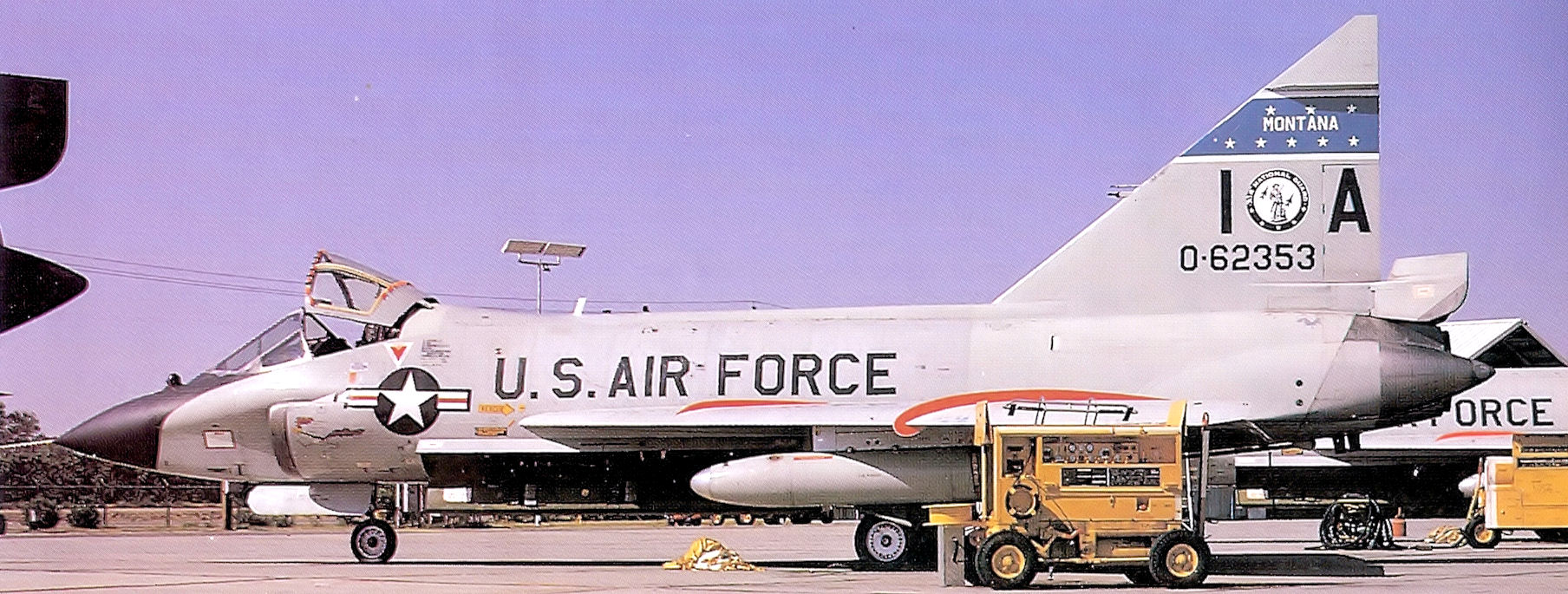
186th FIS TF-102A 56-2353, about 1970

On 1 April 1951, the unit was activated for duty in South Korea. Personnel were sent to Moody AFB, Ga., and ten F-51s were shipped to Korea. The squadron became a F-51D Fighter-Bomber training unit. The 186th was returned to Montana State control in November 1952 and on 1 January 1953, the squadron was reformed at Gore Field with Captain Rodger D. Young as Commander. Promoted to Colonel, Young served as Group Commander until 1966 when he was promoted to Brig. General and Chief of Staff for Air for the 120th Fighter Group until his retirement in 1973. Under the Command of Brig Gen. Young the unit flew the F-86, F-94, F-89, F102 and F-106 fighters.

After the Korean War, the squadron was equipped with the long-range F-51H Mustang and became a part of Air Defense Command. The unit received its first jet aircraft in December 1952, a T-33 Shooting Star. In early 1953 it was equipped with F-86A Sabre jet interceptors. The squadron was redesignated the 186th Fighter-Interceptor Squadron on 1 November 1953 and adopted the "Charlie Chicken" patch. By July 1955 the transition from the F-51H Mustang to the F-86A Sabre was complete.

On 1 July 1955, the 186th was authorized to expand to a group level, and the 120th Fighter Group (Air Defense) was established by the National Guard Bureau. The 186th FIS becoming the group's flying squadron. Other squadrons assigned into the group were the 120th Headquarters, 120th Material Squadron (Maintenance), 120th Combat Support Squadron, and the 120th USAF Dispensary. Also in 1955, the F-86A day interceptors were replaced by the F-94A Starfire all-weather interceptor.

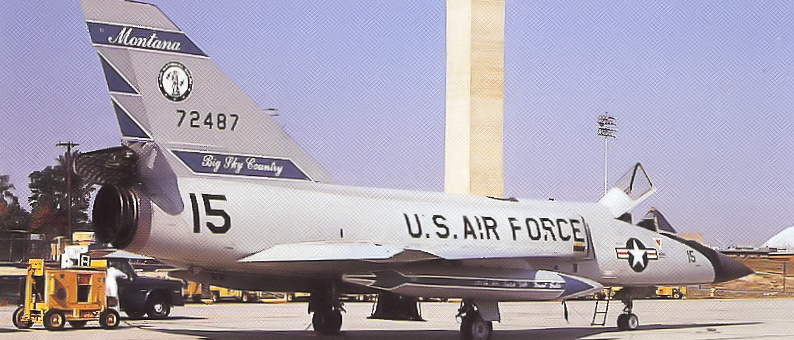
F-106A Delta Dart (Note: Aircraft is Convair F-106A-90-CO Delta Dart, serial 57-2487. It was retired to AMARC on 4 May 1987. Converted to QF-106 target drone. Shot down with AIM-7M on 1 March 1992.)

In 1958, the 120th implemented the ADC Runway Alert Program, in which interceptors of the 186th FIS were committed to a five-minute runway alert, a task that would last for 38 years. The arrival of the F-102 Delta Dagger in 1966 ushered in the supersonic age. 18 F-102s were made combat-ready by October 1967, replacing F-89s. In 1968 Air Defense Command was re-designated as Aerospace Defense Command (ADCOM). In 1972, the unit was redesignated the 120th Fighter-Interceptor Group and assigned the F-106 Delta Dart, the first Air National Guard unit to receive this aircraft. With the F-106, the squadron competed in and won its first William Tell, a live-fire missile competition held at Tyndall AFB, Florida. Performed air defense duties along the northern tier of the United States until 1978 when ADCOM was merged into Tactical Air Command. Continued air defense mission for ADTAC component of TAC with the F-106s, transferring to First Air Force when ADTAC was replaced in 1985.

The 186th FS converted from the F-106A to the F-16A/B Fighting Falcon in mid-1987. The conversion happened earlier than was scheduled and the 186th FIS was to be the last squadron to lose its F-106s. The first aircraft were older block 5 and 10 models with some block 15 airframes also being delivered to the squadron. Main task for the unit was air defense, as with many ANG units who were equipped with the F-16. In 1991 the F-16s were brought up to the Air Defense Fighter (ADF) variant.

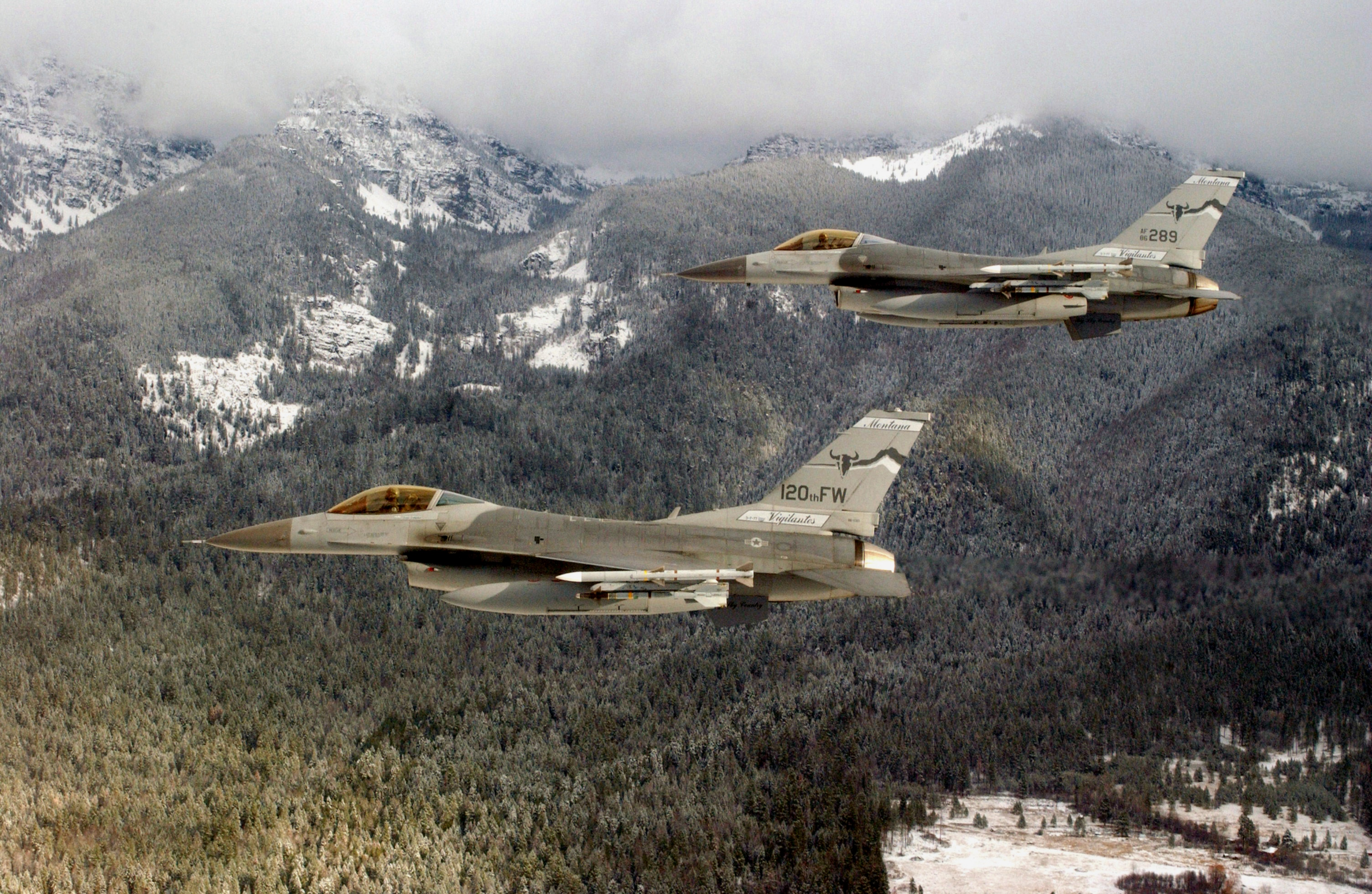
Two F-16C Fighting Falcons from the 186th Fighter Squadron in flight near Nellis Air Force Base.

This meant a serious leap in performance and capability of this squadron in their defensive role. This situation was maintained up until 2001 when the squadron started receiving more modern F-16C block 30 aircraft with a large intake. This conversion replaced the air defense mission with one of general purpose/air-to-ground as part of the Expeditionary Aerospace Force.

With the conversion, unit members felt it was time to consider a change in the aircraft tail markings. The most notable change included the 186th Fighter Squadron's nickname of "Vigilantes". The nickname by the pilots of the 186th is intended to honor the first men in the Montana Territory who organized for the safety and welfare of the people.

The squadron once again found itself on alert status after the terrorism attacks in New York City and Washington, D.C. Base personnel implemented the necessary procedures to establish a secure environment while maintaining a 24-hour alert status for aircraft. Throughout 2002, hundreds of unit personnel were activated and deployed to multiple locations in support of Operation Enduring Freedom and the world.

As a result of the 2005 BRAC decisions, the unit converted to the F-15C/D during 2008 and reverted to an all-air defense unit. In early December 2007 the first F-16 left Great Falls being transferred to the 158th Fighter Wing, Vermont ANG. By the summer of 2008, eighteen F-15C Eagles had been transferred from the 131st Fighter Wing at St. Louis due to its conversion to the 131st Bomb Wing, flying the B-2 stealth bomber.

As a result of the 2010 Total Force Structure Change, the F-15s of the 120th Fighter Wing were transferred to the 144th Fighter Wing of the California Air National Guard and C-130s of the 19th Airlift Wing from Little Rock AFB, Arkansas were transferred to Great Falls. As a result, the 186th Fighter Squadron was rechristened as the 186th Airlift Squadron.

The 186th flew its last C-130H Hercules training flight on 5 October 2026, ending twelve years of operations with the type. The squadron is slated to receive eight C-130J Super Hercules airlifters in 2027.

== Lineage ==
- Constituted as the 404th Fighter Squadron on 25 May 1943

Activated on 15 July 1943
Inactivated on 10 November 1945

- Redesignated: 186th Fighter Squadron (Single Engine) and allotted to the National Guard on 24 May 1946

Organized on 1 April 1947
Extended federal recognition on 27 June 1947
Federalized and placed on active duty on 1 April 1951
Redesignated 186th Fighter-Bomber Squadron on 1 June 1951
Released from active duty and returned to Montana state control on 1 January 1953
Redesignated 186th Fighter-Interceptor Squadron, on 1 January 1953 and activated in the Montana Air National Guard
Redesignated 186th Fighter Squadron on 15 March 1992
Redesignated 186th Airlift Squadron on 1 March 2014

=== Assignments ===
- 371st Fighter Group, 15 July 1943 – 10 November 1945
- 142d Fighter Group, 1 April 1947
- 140th Fighter Group, 1 November 1950
- 146th Fighter Group (later 146th Fighter-Bomber Group), 1 April 1951
- 142d Fighter-Inte3rceptor Group, 1 January 1953
- 120th Fighter Group (Air Defense) (later 120th Fighter-Interceptor Group, 120th Fighter Group), 1 April 1956
- 120th Operations Group, 1 October 1995 – Present

=== Stations ===
- Richmond Army Air Base, Virginia, 15 July 1943
- Camp Springs Army Air Field, Maryland, 30 September 1943
- Richmond Army Air Base, Virginia, 18 January – 14 February 1944
- RAF Bisterne (AAF-415), England, March 1944
- Beuzeville Airfield (A-6), France, June 1944
- Perthes Airfield (A-65), France, 18 September 1944
- Dole/Tavaux Airfield (Y-7), France, 1 October 1944
- Tantonville Airfield (Y-1), France, 20 December 1944
- Metz Airfield (Y-34), France, 15 February 1945
- Frankfurt/Eschborn Airfield (Y-74), Germany, 7 April 1945
- Fürth Airfield (R-28), Germany, 5 May 1945
- AAF Station Hoersching, Austria, 16 August 1945
- Strasbourg/Entzheim Airport, France, September– October 1945
- Camp Shanks, New York, 9–10 November 1945
- Moody Air Force Base, Georgia, 1 May 1951 – 1 January 1953
- Gore Field (later Great Falls International Airport), Montana, 1 January 1953 – present

=== Aircraft ===
- P-47 Thunderbolt, 1943–1945
- F-51D Mustang, 1947–1953
- F-86A Sabre, 1953–1955
- F-94A Starfire, 1955–1956
- F-89C Scorpion, 1956–1958
- F-89H Scorpion, 1958–1960
- F-89J Scorpion, 1960–1966
- F-102 Delta Dagger, 1967–1972
- F-106 Delta Dart, 1972–1987
- F-16A Fighting Falcon, 1987–2001
- F-16C Fighting Falcon, 2001–2008
- F-15C Eagle, 2008–2014
- C-130H Hercules, 2014 – 2026
- C-130J Super Hercules, 2027 – onwards

== Bibliography ==
- Anderson, Capt. Barry (1985). Army Air Forces Stations: A Guide to the Stations Where U.S. Army Air Forces Personnel Served in the United Kingdom During World War II (PDF). Maxwell AFB, AL: Research Division, USAF Historical Research Center. Archived from the original (PDF) on 23 January 2016.
- Johnson, 1st Lt. David C. (1988). U.S. Army Air Forces Continental Airfields (ETO) D-Day to V-E Day (PDF). Maxwell AFB, AL: Research Division, USAF Historical Research Center. Archived from the original (PDF) on 29 September 2015.
- Maurer, Maurer, ed. (1983) [1961]. Air Force Combat Units of World War II (PDF) (reprint ed.). Washington, DC: Office of Air Force History. pp. 257–258. ISBN 0-912799-02-1. LCCN 61060979.
- Maurer, Maurer, ed. (1982) [1969]. Combat Squadrons of the Air Force, World War II (PDF) (reprint ed.). Washington, DC: Office of Air Force History. pp. 497–498. ISBN 0-405-12194-6. LCCN 70605402. OCLC 72556. Archived from the original (PDF) on 20 December 2016.
- Rogers, B. (2006). United States Air Force Unit Designations Since 1978. ISBN 1-85780-197-0
- History of the 120th Fighter Wing
- Cornett, Lloyd H. and Johnson, Mildred W., A Handbook of Aerospace Defense Organization 1946–1980, Office of History, Aerospace Defense Center, Peterson AFB, CO (1980).
- 186th Fighter Squadron lineage and history
