= 144th Fighter Wing =

Unit of the California Air National Guard

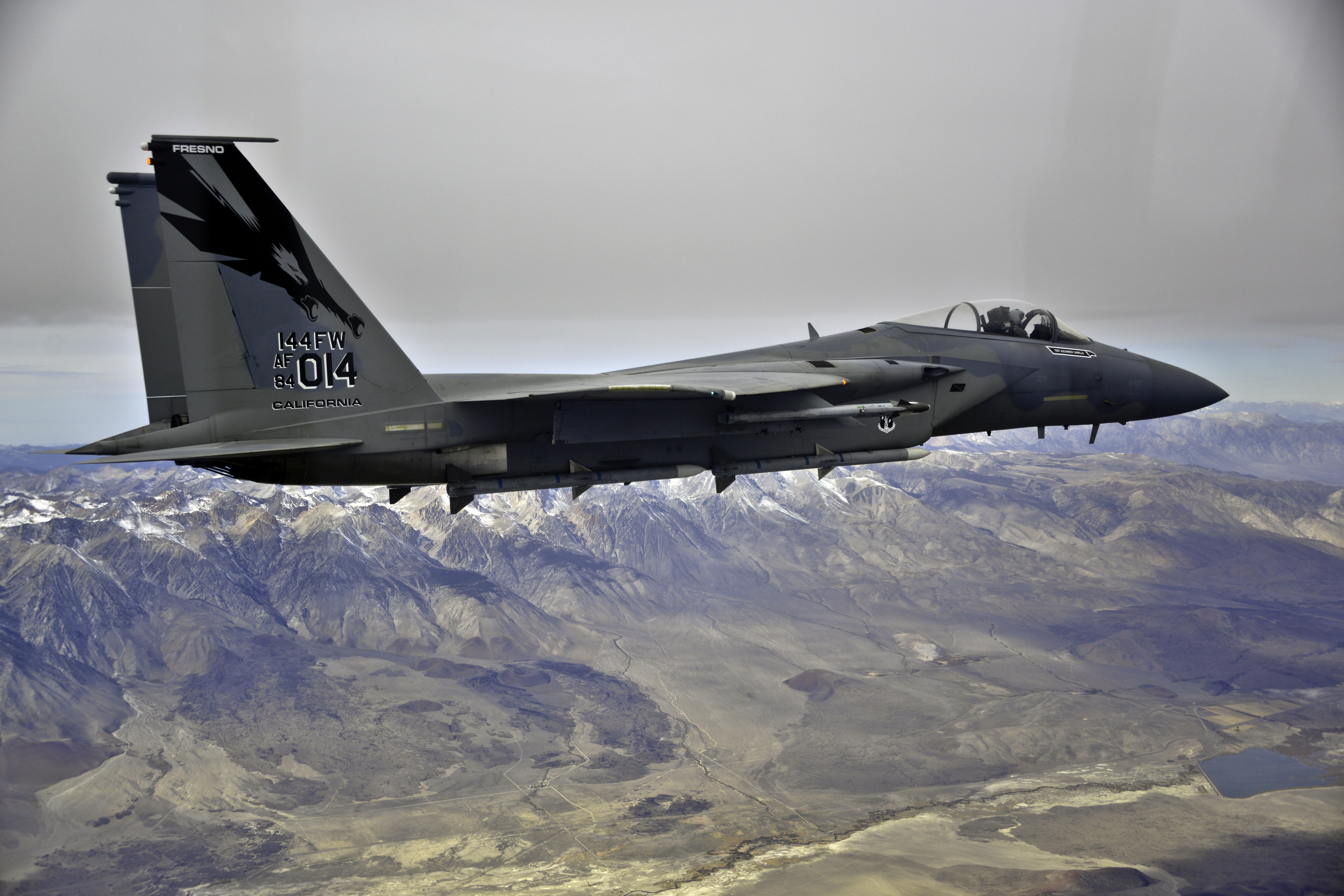
- F-15C Eagle of the 144th Fighter Wing
- Active: 1950–present
- Country: United States
- Allegiance: California
- Branch: Air National Guard
- Type: Wing
- Role: Fighter/Air Defense
- Part of: California Air National Guard
- Garrison/HQ: Fresno Air National Guard Base, Fresno, California
- Tail code: "California" with "Fresno" stripe

Commanders
- Current commander: Colonel Travis "Plague" Stephens

Insignia
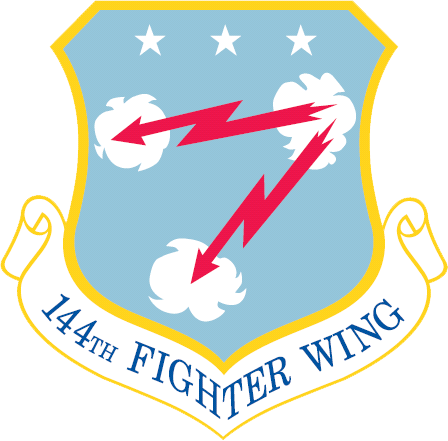
- 144th Fighter Wing

Aircraft flown
- Fighter: 21 F-15 Eagle

The 144th Fighter Wing (144 FW) is a unit of the California Air National Guard, stationed at Fresno Air National Guard Base, California. As part of the Air Reserve Component of the United States Air Force, the wing is operationally gained by the Air Combat Command.

== Mission ==
The 144th Fighter Wing's primary federal mission under Title 10 USC is to provide air defense protection for California and the United States from the Mexican border to Oregon utilizing the F-15 Eagle jet fighter aircraft. In its state mission under Title 32 USC, the 144th also supports the nation's Counter Drug Program and responds to state emergencies when requested by the Governor of California.

The wing previously flew the F-16C and F-16D Fighting Falcon, having transferred the last F-16C aircraft to the Arizona Air National Guard in November 2013. The wing's current inventory of aircraft includes 21 F-15Cs and F-15Ds and consists of 18 Primary Aircraft Authorized (PAA) and 3 Backup Aircraft Inventory (BAI) that were previously assigned to the Montana Air National Guard, Missouri Air National Guard and Nellis Air Force Base. The wing also operates one C-26A transport.

== Units ==
The 144th Fighter Wing is composed of the following units:

- 144th Operations Group

194th Fighter Squadron

- 144th Maintenance Group
- 144th Mission Support Group
- 144th Medical Group.

== History ==
=== California Air National Guard ===
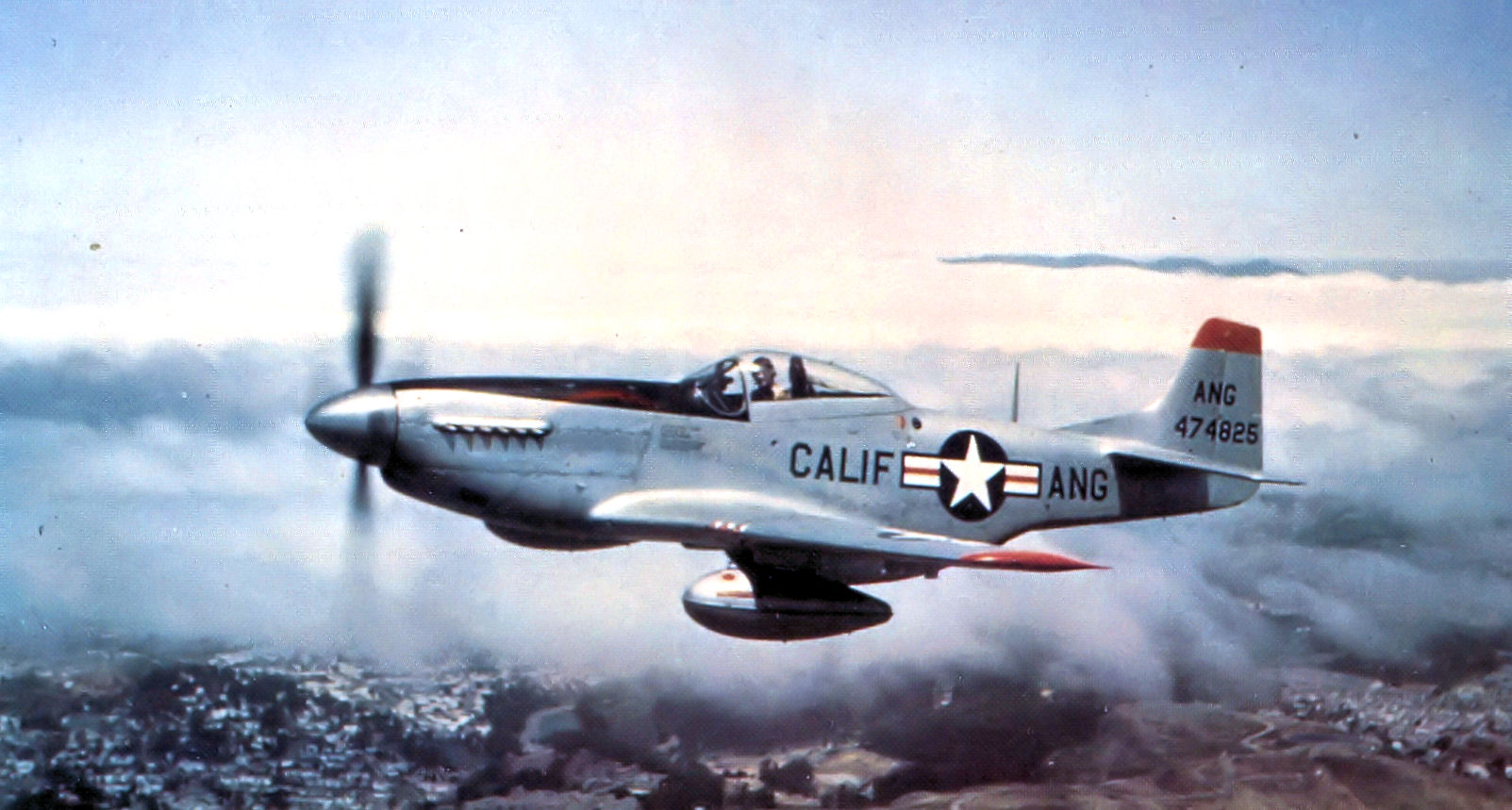
F-51D-30-NA Mustang, AF Ser. No. 44-74825, flying over Northern California, 1948

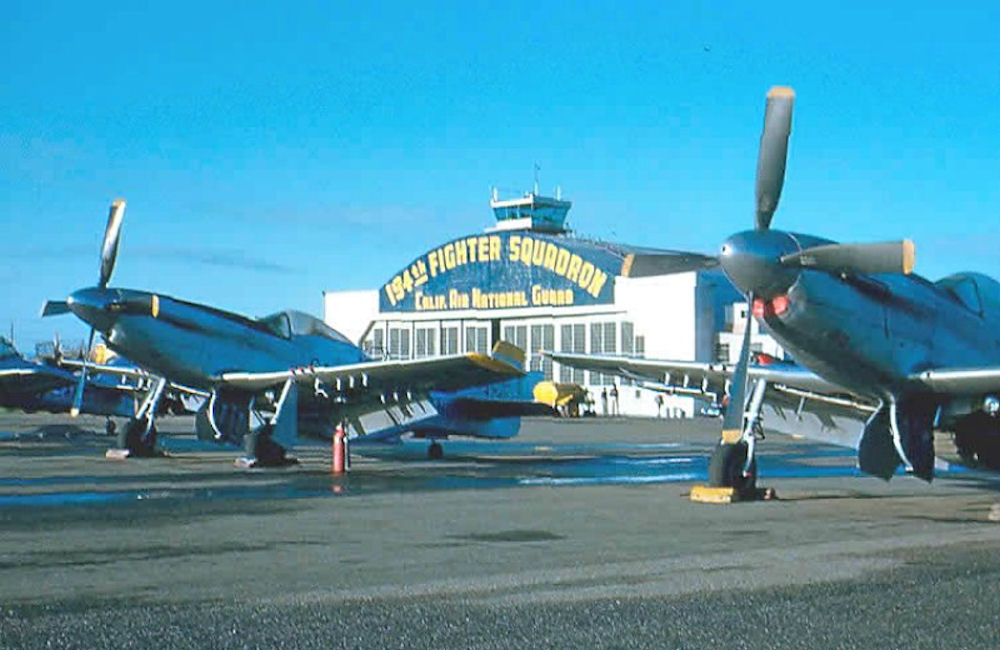
Hayward Air National Guard Base, California, 1953, F-51H Mustangs.

At the end of October 1950, the Air National Guard converted to the wing-base (Hobson Plan) organization. As a result, the 61st Fighter Wing was withdrawn from the California ANG and inactivated on 31 October 1950. The 144th Fighter Wing was established by the National Guard Bureau, allocated to the state of California, recognized and activated on 1 November 1950, assuming the personnel, equipment, and mission of the inactivated 61st Fighter Wing. The 144th Fighter Group was assigned to the new wing as its operational group with the three fighter squadrons.

==== Air Defense Mission ====
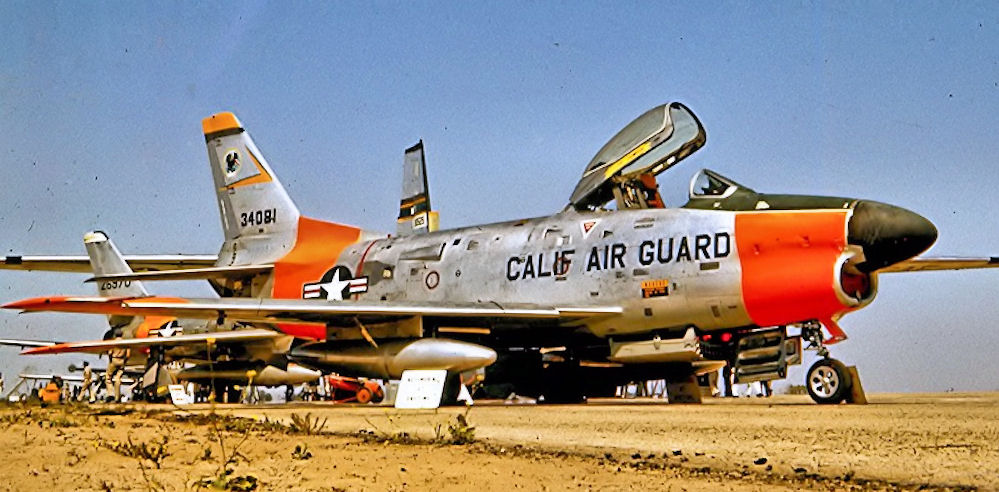
194th FIS F-86L Sabre Interceptors, 1960

With the surprise invasion of South Korea on 25 June 1950, and the tactical air forces lack of readiness due to postwar force reductions and greater emphasis on the Strategic Air Command nuclear mission in the active Air Force, most of the Air National Guard was federalized and placed on active duty. The squadrons of the 144th Fighter Group were retained by the Air National Guard and not deployed, however numerous pilots from all three of the group's squadrons volunteered for combat duty. The F-51Ds were exchanged for F-51H Mustangs in 1951, as the "D" model of the Mustang was needed for close air support missions in Korea. The F-51H was a Very Long Range version of the Mustang, which was developed to escort B-29 Superfortress bombers to Japan, but not considered rugged enough to be used in Korea. The increased range, however, was well-suited for air defense interceptor alert flights. During its years with the P-51H, the unit earned prominence as one of the Air Force's most respected aerial gunnery competitors. In June 1953, while still flying the Mustang, the unit qualified for the first all-jet, worldwide gunnery meet. Using borrowed F-86A Sabre jets, the 144th, which represented the Air National Guard, placed fifth in competition.

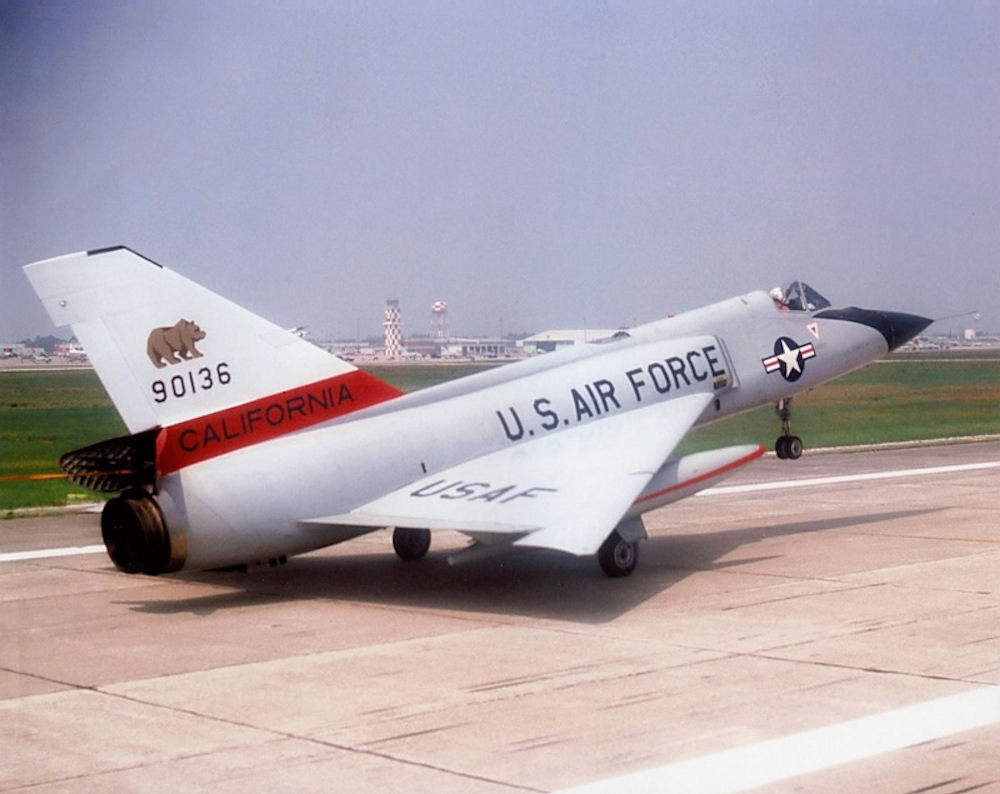
194th FIS F-106 Delta Dart, AF Ser. No. 59-0136

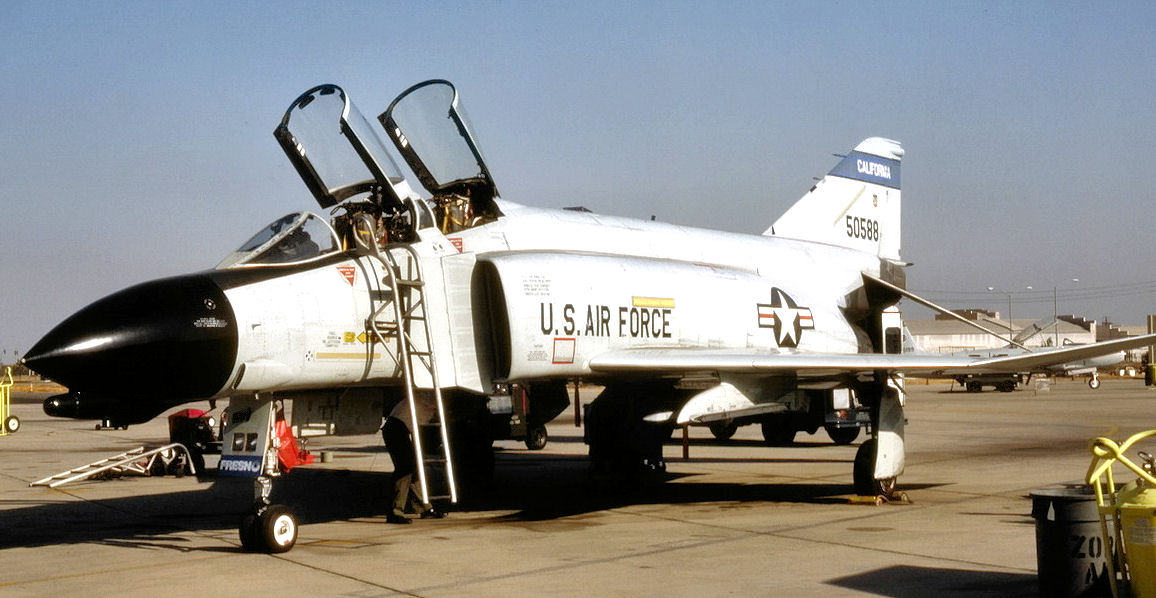
194th Fighter-Interceptor Squadron McDonnell F-4D-26-MC Phantom II, AF Ser. No. 65-0588, now on static display at Fresno Air National Guard Base.

With the increased availability of jet aircraft after the Korean War, the squadron's aircraft were upgraded from the piston-engine, propeller driven F-51H to its first jet aircraft, the F-86A Sabre Day Interceptor in 1954. At the same time, the 194th relocated to Fresno Air Terminal, followed by the wing in 1957. On 7 July 1955, the 144th was re-designated as the 194th Fighter-Interceptor Wing, a designation kept by the squadron for the next 37 years. With the F-86A, the 144th began standing dusk-to-dawn alerts, joining its active duty Air Defense Command (ADC) counterparts, with ADC operationally gaining the 144th within the active U.S. Air Force under Title 10 USC.

The 194th continued to fly the F-86A until 31 March 1958. On 1 April 1958, the transition was made to the F-86L Sabre Interceptor, which was designed from the onset as an interceptor, had all-weather capability and was able to be used in all weather. In addition, the F-86L could be controlled and directed by the SAGE computer-controlled Ground Control Interceptor (Radar) sites which would vector the aircraft to the unidentified target for interception.

In 1958, the Nevada and Utah Air National Guard were authorized to expand to a Group level. The 152nd Fighter-Interceptor Group, Nevada ANG, was federally recognized on 19 April 1958; the 151st Fighter-Interceptor Group, Utah ANG, on 1 July 1958. With Nevada and Utah forming their own command and control structure, command and control of the 191st and 192nd FIS were transferred to their state organizations.

On 1 July 1964, the 194th began flying the F-102A Delta Dagger, a Mach 1.25 supersonic interceptor. In January 1968, Air Defense Command was renamed Aerospace Defense Command, and continued to maintain operational responsibility. On 25 July 1974, the 194th retired the F-102 and brought the improved F-106 Delta Dart into service, continuing to fly this aircraft until 31 December 1983. On 1 October 1978 Aerospace Defense Command was inactivated, its units being reassigned to Air Defense, Tactical Air Command (ADTAC), a sub-element of Tactical Air Command (TAC), with ADTAC being established as compatible to a Numbered Air Force under TAC. TAC later replaced the aging F-106s on 1 January 1984 with F-4D Phantom IIs for use in the air defense interceptor mission. On 6 December 1985, ADTAC was disestablished and its role and responsibilities assumed by the reestablished First Air Force, a TAC organization which assumed operational oversight for all Air National Guard fighter units assigned to the air defense role.

==== Modern era ====
The 144th Fighter-Interceptor Wing received their first F-16A Fighting Falcons in October 1989. These were of the block 15 type, replacing the F-4D in the air defense and attack roles. The block 15 aircraft were not ideally suited to the squadron's dedicated air defense mission. This was remedied when the aircraft received the Air Defense Fighter (ADF) upgrade in 1990.

Effective 16 March 1992, the 144th Fighter-Interceptor Wing was re-designated as the 144th Fighter Wing (144 FW), with all related Fighter Interceptor Groups and Squadrons becoming Fighter Groups and Fighter Squadrons. On 1 June 1992, following the disestablishment of Tactical Air Command (TAC), the 144 FW was reassigned to the newly established Air Combat Command (ACC) under First Air Force.

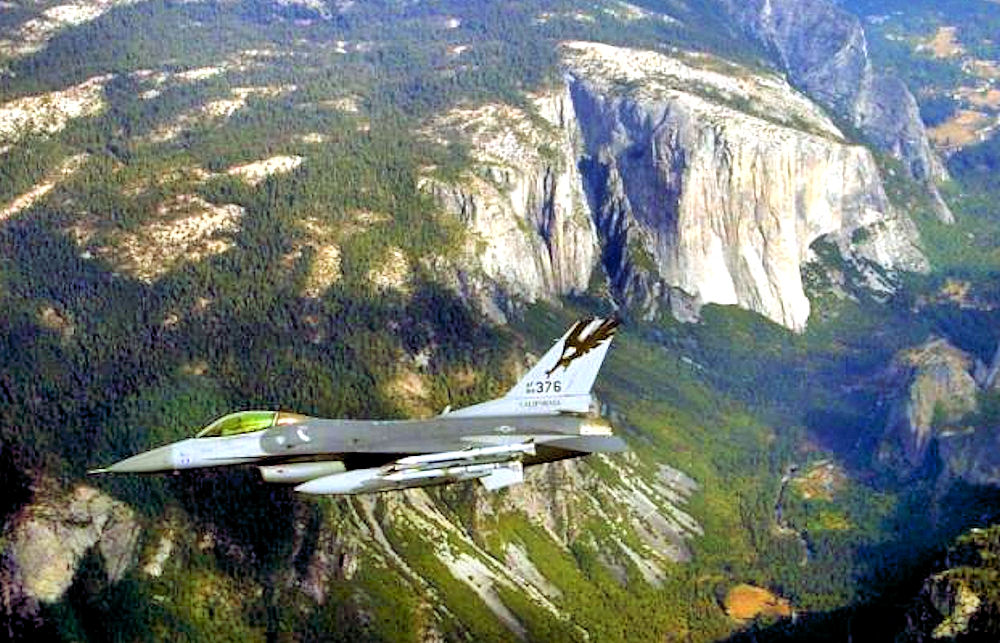
194th Fighter Squadron General Dynamics F-16C Block 25E Fighting Falcon, AF Ser. No. 84-1376, flying over the Sierra Nevada with four AIM-120 missiles on an Operation Noble Eagle mission in 2002

During this time the 194th Fighter Squadron also had an alert detachment at George AFB in Victorville, California. George AFB was closed in 1992 due to BRAC action as part of the overall downsizing of the US military after the Cold War and the alert detachment moved to March Air Force Base, since renamed as March Air Reserve Base due to a later BRAC action. In 1995, the squadron transitioned to the more capable F-16C Fighting Falcon Block 25 aircraft.

The 144th Fighter Wing was the busiest dedicated air defense wing in the country during 1999, with deployments to eight countries and more than a half-dozen states. Combat training had many highlights throughout the year. Fifty wing members deployed five F-16s to Naval Air Station Fallon, Nevada, to participate in the Navy's annual joint combat training exercise. Members of the unit also traveled to Tyndall AFB, Florida for Combat Archer which provided an opportunity for live fire weapons training. To top off the year, six dozen members and six aircraft deployed to Nellis AFB, Nevada between 24 October and 7 November for Red Flag. During the opening minutes of the exercise, a 144th Fighter Wing four-ship flight executed a simulated kill against four actual MiG-29s. These were the first-ever MiG-29 kills in a Red Flag exercise.

Also in 1999, the 144th Civil Engineering Squadron's Fire Department deployed to Sheppard AFB, Texas for training, and 44 members of the 144th Services Flight trained at Tyndall AFB, Florida. Fifty-five members of the 144th Medical Squadron received medical readiness training at Alpena Combat Readiness Training Center, Michigan.

As the F-16C Block 25 aircraft came to the end of their operational lifespan, the 194th Fighter Squadron began to receive F-16C Block 32 aircraft in December 2006. All aircraft were replaced by the end of 2007.

The 144th Fighter Wing started the conversion process to the F-15C Eagle from the 120th Fighter Wing of the Montana Air National Guard with the arrival of the first of 21 F-15s on 18 June 2013. The last F-16 departed the 144th Fighter Wing on 7 November 2013, destined for 162nd Fighter Wing of the Arizona Air National Guard.

It was announced in 2023 that the 144th Fighter Wing would replace the F-15C Eagle with the updated Boeing F-15EX Eagle II.

=== Lineage ===
- Established as 144th Fighter Wing and allotted to California ANG, 31 October 1950

Organized and received federal recognition, 1 November 1950

144th Fighter Group assigned as subordinate unit

Re-designated: 144th Fighter-Bomber Wing, 1 December 1952

Group re-designated 144th Fighter-Bomber Group

Re-designated: 144th Fighter-Interceptor Wing, 7 July 1955

Group re-designated 144th Fighter-Interceptor Group
144th Fighter-Interceptor Group inactivated 30 June 1974

Re-designated: 144th Fighter Wing, 16 March 1992

Group re-activated and re-designated 144th Operations Group

=== Assignments ===
- California Air National Guard, 1 November 1950 – present

Gained by: Western Air Defense Force, Air Defense Command
Gained by: San Francisco Air Defense Sector, Air Defense Command, 1 July 1960
Gained by: 26th Air Division, Air Defense Command, 1 April 1966
Gained by: 26th Air Division, Aerospace Defense Command, 1 January 1970
Gained by: Air Defense, Tactical Air Command (ADTAC), 1 October 1979
Gained by: First Air Force, Tactical Air Command, 9 December 1985
Gained by: Northwest Air Defense Sector (NWADS), 1 July 1987
Gained by: Western Air Defense Sector (WADS), 1 October 1997 – present

=== Components ===
- 144th Fighter Group (later 144th Fighter-Bomber Group, 144th Fighter-Interceptor Group, 144th Fighter Group, 144th Fighter-Interceptor Group, 144th Operations Group), 1 October 1950 –9 July 1976, 16 March 1992 – present
- 194th Fighter-Interceptor Squadron, 9 July 1976– c. 1 Janu1ry 1993

=== Stations ===
- Hayward Air National Guard Base, California, 1 November 1950
- Fresno Air Terminal, California, c. February 1957

Designated: Fresno Air National Guard Base, California, 1991 – present

  - Additional Alert Detachment at March Air Reserve Base, 1995 – present

=== Aircraft ===
- F-51D Mustang, 1950–1954
- L-17 Navion, 1950-1954
- T-6 Texan, 1950-1954
- B-26 Invader, 1950-1954
- C-47 Skytrain, 1950-1954
- F-86A Sabre, 1954–1958
- F-86L Sabre, 1958–1964
- F-102 Delta Dagger, 1965–1974
- F-106 Delta Dart, 1974–1983
- F-4D Phantom II, 1983–1989
- F-16A Fighting Falcon, 1989–1995
- F-16C/D Fighting Falcon, 1995 – 2013
- F-15C/D Eagle, 2013–present
- F-15EX Eagle II (planned)
