= 120th Airlift Wing =

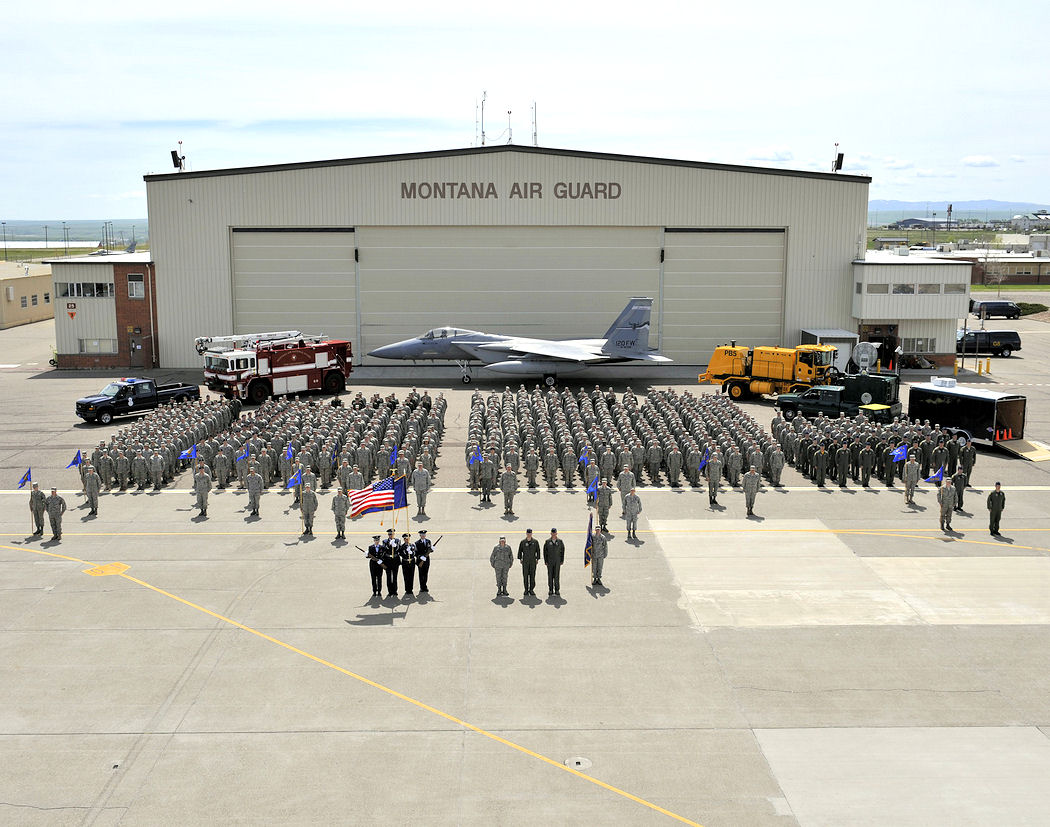
- 120th Fighter Wing – Formation
- Active: 1956 – present
- Country: United States
- Allegiance: Montana
- Branch: Air National Guard
- Type: Wing
- Role: Airlift
- Size: 900+
- Part of: Montana Air National Guard
- Garrison/HQ: Great Falls Air National Guard Base, Great Falls, Montana
- Motto: Vigilantes - Ready to Ride!

Commanders
- Current commander: Colonel Trace N. Thomas

Insignia
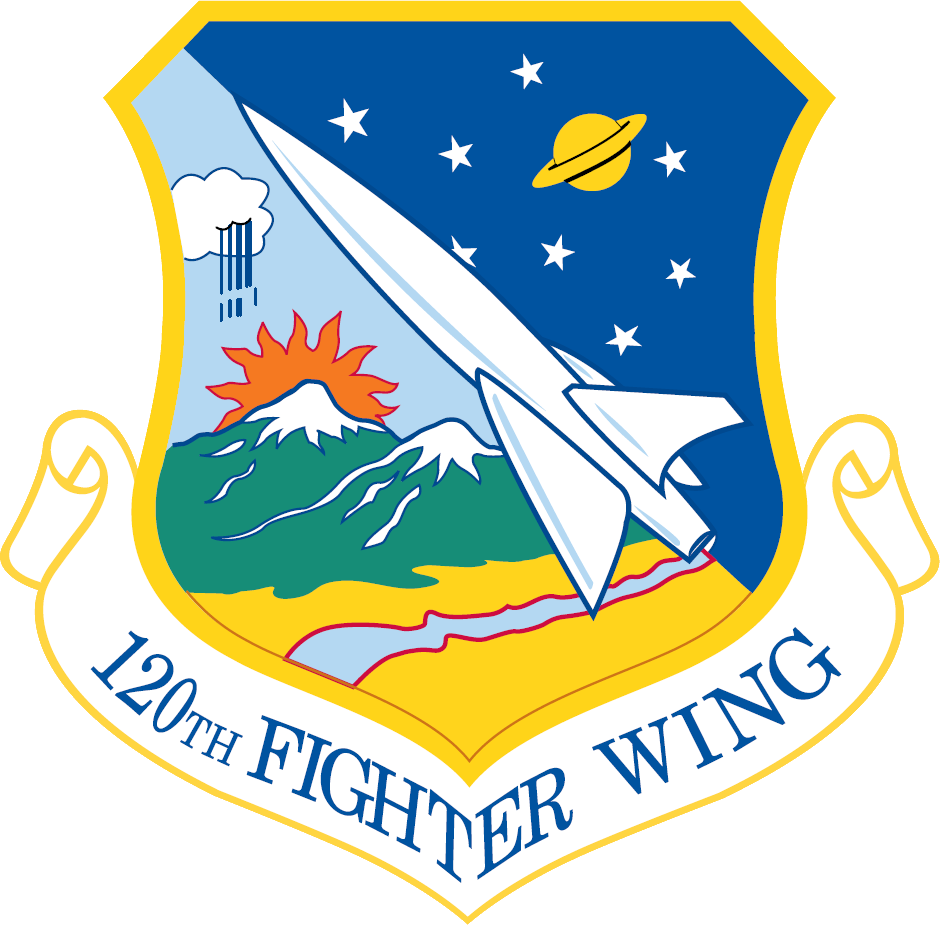
- 120th Airlift Wing emblem
- Tail stripe: White stripe "Montana"; Steer/mountain skyline

The 120th Airlift Wing is a unit of the Montana Air National Guard, stationed at Great Falls Air National Guard Base at Great Falls International Airport, Montana. If activated to federal service, the wing is gained by the United States Air Force Air Mobility Command.

== Mission ==
The 120th Airlift Wing, as part of the Montana Air National Guard, serves a dual mission:

- They are both full-time components of the Air Expeditionary Forces mission which participates in the defense of the United States.
- They are also on call for use by the state Governor to use in case of natural disasters to augment state declared emergencies.

== Units ==
The 120th Airlift Wing consists of the following units:

- 120th Operations Group

186th Airlift Squadron

- 120th Mission Support Group
- 120th Maintenance Group
- 120th Medical Group

== History ==
In 1956, the Montana Air National Guard 186th Fighter-Interceptor Squadron was authorized to expand to a group level, and the 120th Fighter Group (Air Defense) was established by the National Guard Bureau. The 186th FIS becoming the group's flying squadron. Other squadrons assigned into the group were the 120th Headquarters, 120th Material Squadron (Maintenance), 120th Combat Support Squadron, and the 120th USAF Dispensary. The group was gained by the 29th Air Division, Air Defense Command with a mission for the air defense of the northern tier of the United States. The Group Commander, Col. Rodger D. Young was promoted to Brig. General in 1966 and became Chief of Staff of Air for the 120th until his retirement in 1973.

In 1958, the 120th implemented the ADC Runway Alert Program, in which interceptors of the 186th FIS were committed to a five-minute runway alert, a task that would last for 38 years. The arrival of the F-102 Delta Dagger in 1966 ushered in the supersonic age. In 1968 Air Defense Command was re-designated as Aerospace Defense Command (ADCOM). In 1972, the unit was redesignated the 120th Fighter-Interceptor Group and assigned the F-106 Delta Dart, the first Air National Guard unit to receive this aircraft. With the F-106, the squadron competed in and won its first William Tell, a live-fire missile competition held at Tyndall AFB, Florida. Performed air defense duties along the northern tier of the United States until 1978 when ADCOM was merged into Tactical Air Command. Continued air defense mission for ADTAC component of TAC with the F-106s, transferring to First Air Force when ADTAC was replaced in 1985.

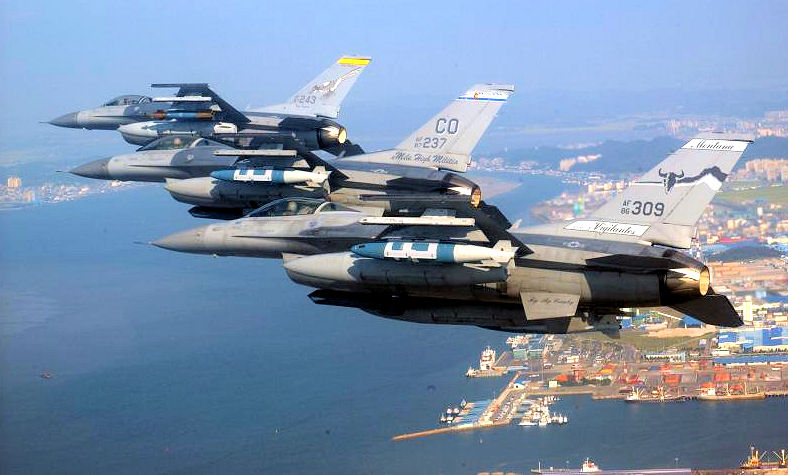
A three-ship formation of Air National Guard F-16s fly over Kunsan City, South Korea.

The 186th FS converted from the F-106A to the F-16A/B Fighting Falcon in mid-1987. The conversion happened earlier than was scheduled and the 186th FIS was to be the last squadron to lose its F-106s. The first aircraft were older block 5 and 10 models with some block 15 airframes also being delivered to the squadron. Main task for the unit was air defense, as with many ANG units who were equipped with the F-16. In 1991 the F-16s were brought up to the Air Defense Fighter (ADF) variant. This meant a serious leap in performance and capability of this squadron in their defensive role. This situation was maintained up until 2001 when the squadron started receiving more modern F-16C block 30 aircraft with larger intakes. This conversion replaced the air defense mission with one of general purpose/air-to-ground as part of the Expeditionary Aerospace Force.

With the conversion, unit members felt it was time to consider a change in the aircraft tail markings. The most notable change included the 186th Fighter Squadron's nickname of "Vigilantes". The nickname by the pilots of the 186th is intended to honor the first men in the Montana Territory who organized for the safety and welfare of the people.

The squadron once again found itself on alert status after the terrorism attacks in New York City and Washington, D.C. Base personnel implemented the necessary procedures to establish a secure environment while maintaining a 24-hour alert status for aircraft. During 2002, hundreds of unit personnel were activated and deployed to multiple locations in support of Operation Enduring Freedom and the world.

As a result of the 2005 BRAC decisions the unit converted to the F-15C/D during 2008 and revert to an all-air defense unit. In early December 2007 the first F-16 left Great Falls being transferred to the 158th Fighter Wing, Vermont ANG. By the summer of 2008, eighteen F-15C Eagles had been transferred from the 131st Fighter Wing at St. Louis due to its conversion to the 131st Bomb Wing, flying the B-2 stealth bomber.

Beginning in the summer of 2013, the Wing began the process of transferring its F-15C aircraft to the 144th Fighter Wing of the California Air National Guard. The final F-15 aircraft departed Great Falls on 24 October 2013. The 120th received their first C-130H from the 19th Airlift Wing on 1 March 2014

The wing flew its last C-130H Hercules training flight on 5 October 2026, ending twelve years of operations with the type. The unit is slated to receive eight C-130J Super Hercules airlifters in 2027.

== Lineage ==
- Designated 120th Fighter Group (Air Defense) and allotted to Montana ANG

Extended federal recognition and activated on 15 April 1956
Redesignated 120th Fighter-Interceptor Group on 1 July 1972
Redesignated 120th Fighter Group on 15 March 1992
Redesignated 120th Fighter Wing on 1 October 1995
Redesignated 120th Airlift Wing on 1 March 2014

=== Assignments ===
- 140th Air Defense Wing, 16 April 1956
- Montana Air National Guard, 1 January 1961

Gained by: Great Falls Air Defense Sector, Air Defense Command
Gained by: 28th Air Division, Air Defense Command, 1 April 1966
Gained by: 24th Air Division, Aerospace Defense Command, 1 January 1970
Gained by: Air Defense, Tactical Air Command (ADTAC), 1 October 1979
Gained by: First Air Force, Tactical Air Command, 9 December 1985
Gained by: Northwest Air Defense Sector (NWADS), 1 July 1987
Gained by: Western Air Defense Sector (WADS), 1 October 1997
Jointly Gained by: Air Combat Command, 1 September 2001
Jointly Gained by: Air Mobility Command, 1 March 2014

=== Components ===
- 120th Operations Group, 1 October 1995 – Present
- 186th Fighter-Interceptor Squadron (later 186th Fighter Squadron, 186th Airlift Squadron), 1 April 1956 – 1 October 1995

=== Stations ===
- Great Falls International Airport, Montana, 15 April 1956

Designated: Great Falls Air National Guard Base, Montana, 1991 – present
Detachment 1 operated from Davis-Monthan AFB, Arizona (undetermined dates)

=== Aircraft ===
- F-94A Starfire, 1956
- F-89C Scorpion, 1956–1958
- F-89H Scorpion, 1958–1960
- F-89J Scorpion, 1960–1966
- F-102 Delta Dagger, 1966–1972
- F-106 Delta Dart, 1972–1987
- F-16A Fighting Falcon, 1987–2001
- F-16C Fighting Falcon, 2001–2008
- F-15C Eagle, 2008–2014
- C-130H Hercules, 2014 – 2026
- C-130J Super Hercules, 2027 – onwards
