= Great Falls International Airport =

International airport in Great Falls, Montana, United States

Great Falls International Airport (former Great Falls Army Airfield)

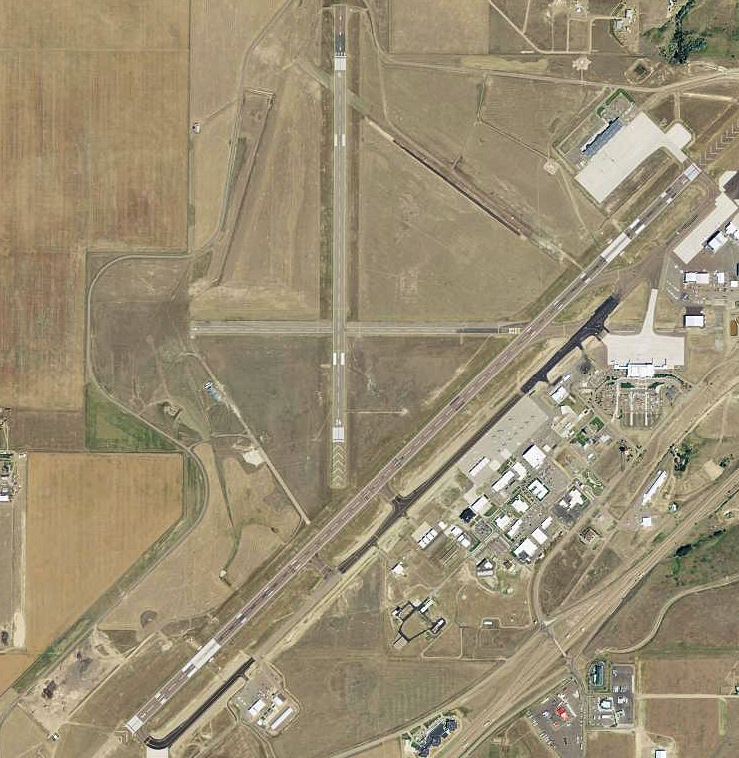
- USGS 2006 orthophoto
- IATA: GTF; ICAO: KGTF; FAA LID: GTF

Summary
- Airport type: Public
- Owner: Great Falls International Airport Authority
- Serves: Great Falls, Montana
- Hub for: Corporate Air Cargo (secondary); FedEx Express (regional)
- Elevation AMSL: 3,680 ft (1,120 m)
- Coordinates: 47°28′58″N 111°22′14″W
- Website: www.flygtf.com

Map
- Location of airport in Montana GTF (the United States)

Runways
Direction	Length		Surface
Direction	ft	m	Surface
03/21	10,502	3,201	Asphalt
17/35	6,030	1,838	Asphalt

Statistics (2024)
- Aircraft operations: 33,605
- Based aircraft: 84
- Total Passengers: 371,000
- Source: Federal Aviation Administration

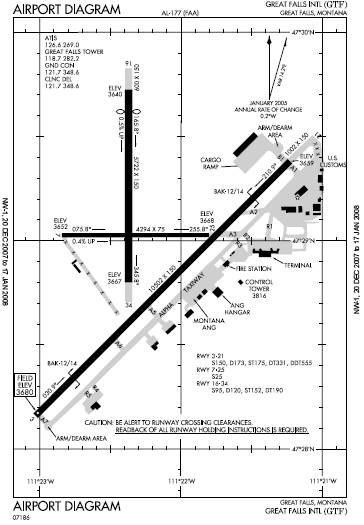
KGTF airport diagram

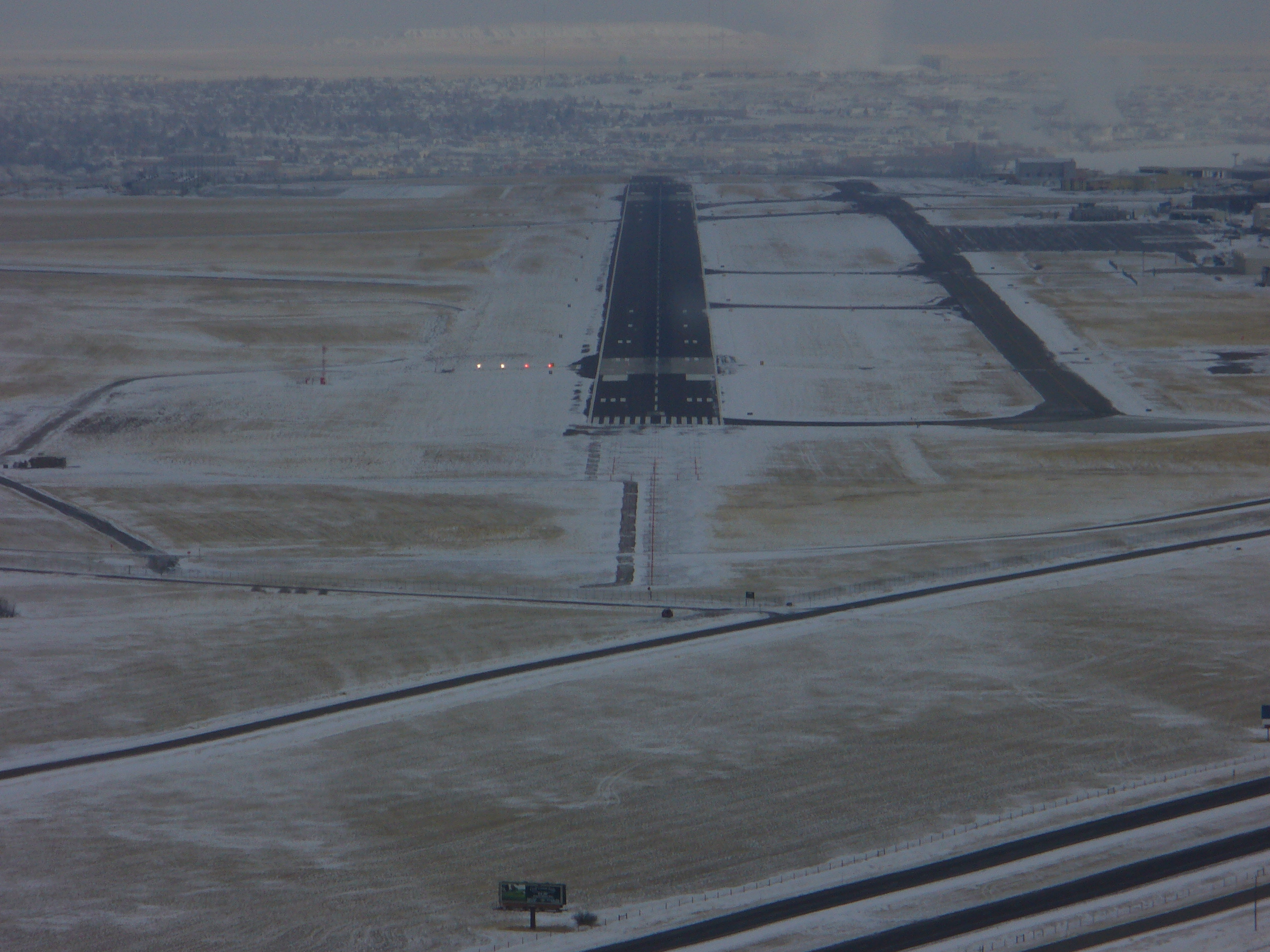
On final approach for Runway 3 at GTF International Airport

Great Falls International Airport (IATA: GTF, ICAO: KGTF, FAA LID: GTF) is a public/military airport in city limits three miles southwest of central Great Falls in Cascade County, Montana, United States. The airport has also been called Great Falls Municipal Airport.

The National Plan of Integrated Airport Systems for 2011–2015 categorized it as a primary commercial service airport. Federal Aviation Administration records say the airport had 143,811 passenger boardings (enplanements) in calendar year 2008, 146,438 in 2009 and 155,204 in 2010.

Great Falls International Airport is home to Great Falls Air National Guard Base, which hosts the Montana Air National Guard's 120th Airlift Wing (120 AW), the "Vigilantes." Operationally-gained by Air Mobility Command (AMC), the 120 AW reequipped with the Lockheed C-130 Hercules in 2014, which it employs in medium airlift missions. In its previous incarnation as the 120th Fighter Wing, it previously flew the McDonnell Douglas F-15 Eagle.

Malmstrom Air Force Base, home of the 341st Missile Wing (341 MW) of the Air Force Global Strike Command (AFGSC), is 10 miles (16 km) east of GTF, on the east side of Great Falls. With the transfer of its KC-135 aircraft in the 1990s, Malmstrom's 12,000-foot (3,700 m) runway is closed to fixed-wing traffic and open only to military helicopters, so Great Falls ANGB provides support for fixed-wing military aircraft visiting Malmstrom AFB.

== History ==
Great Falls International Airport was initiated in November 1928. The airport was leased by the U.S. War Department during World War II and became a home for the 7th Ferrying Group (Air Transport Command) of the U.S. Army Air Forces during the war. Located on Gore Hill, the airport was known as Gore Field during its military use. During the war years, more than 7,500 bombers and fighter aircraft passed through Great Falls on their way to Europe and the Pacific. The U.S. Army acquired an additional 740 acres (3.0 km^{2}) and built many buildings and other facilities. The airport was under government control until June 1948 when the Department of Defense deeded it back to the City of Great Falls with the stipulation that the facility could revert to military control in a national emergency. The airport was released from this clause in 1961.

In 1975 the terminal was replaced and all runways, aprons, and taxiways updated. With Federal Aviation Administration matching funds, the Great Falls International Airport Authority performs annual operations, maintenance, and capital improvements.

The award-winning terminal was designed by Davidson-Kuhr Architects of Great Falls, Montana, with the lead architect being David S. Davidson.

Great Falls has had airline flights since the 1930s. For at least part of each year from 1977 to 1981 it saw scheduled Northwest DC-10s EWR-DTW-ORD-BIL-GTF-GEG-SEA and back.

In 2011 the airport recorded the most boardings (172,415) in its history. GTF was the fifth-busiest of the state's 15 major airports in 2011, behind Billings (407,960 enplanements), Bozeman (397,822), Missoula (292,530), and Kalispell (179,034).

In early 2012, Frontier Airlines announced new flights to Great Falls from the Denver hub. The Airport Authority hoped to address rising ticket prices and a seasonal shortage of seats with low-cost Frontier flights, but Frontier announced it was pulling out of Great Falls during its Denver hub restructuring in December 2014.

AvMax, a Calgary-based large jet maintenance and repair business, opened a large operation at GTF in 2006; they employ 150.

== Model airplane collection ==
The terminal contains what is believed to be the world's largest collection of model airplanes. 883 such airplanes are on display, about 2/3 of the entire collection. The models were built and painted by local Great Falls resident Bary Poletto from 1977 through 2003. He died in January 2013.

== Facilities ==
The airport covers 2,113 acres (855 ha) at an elevation of 3,680 feet (1,122 m). It has two asphalt runways: 3/21 is 10,502 by 150 feet (3,201 x 46 m); and 17/35 is 6,030 by 150 feet (1,838 x 46 m).

In the year ending December 31, 2018, the airport had 34,599 aircraft operations, average 95 per day: 40% general aviation, 32% air taxi, 11% airline, and 16% military. 84 aircraft were then based at this airport: 58 single-engine, 10 multi-engine, 3 jet, 5 helicopter, and 8 military.

== Airlines and destinations ==
=== Passenger ===
Airlines	Destinations
Alaska Airlines	Seattle/Tacoma
Allegiant Air	Las Vegas, Phoenix/Mesa
Delta Connection	Salt Lake City
United Airlines	Seasonal: Denver
United Express	Denver; Seasonal: Chicago–O'Hare

Destinations map
All destinations from Great Falls International Airport
Red = Year-round destination
Green = Seasonal destination

== Statistics ==
=== Top destinations ===
Busiest domestic routes out of GTF (June 2024 – May 2025)
Rank	City	Passengers	Carriers
1	Denver, Colorado	58,470	United
2	Salt Lake City, Utah	52,970	Delta
3	Seattle/Tacoma, Washington	27,710	Alaska
4	Minneapolis–St. Paul, Minnesota	21,930	Delta
5	Las Vegas, Nevada	13,350	Allegiant
6	Phoenix/Mesa, Arizona	10,620	Allegiant
7	Chicago-O'Hare, Illinois	890	United

== See also ==
- Montana World War II Army Airfields
- Air Transport Command
- List of airports in Montana
