= Montana Air National Guard =

- Active: 27 June 1947 - present
- Country: United States
- Allegiance: Montana
- Branch: Air National Guard
- Type: State militia, military reserve force
- Role: "To meet state and federal mission responsibilities."
- Part of: Montana National Guard; Montana Department of Military Affairs; United States National Guard Bureau
- Garrison/HQ: Montana Air National Guard Headquarters, 2800 Airport 2nd Street, Great Falls, Montana, 59404

Commanders
- Civilian leadership: President Donald Trump (Commander-in-Chief); Gary A. Ashworth (Secretary of the Air Force); Governor Greg Gianforte (Governor of the State of Montana)
- State military leadership: Brigadier General Trace N. Thomas

Insignia
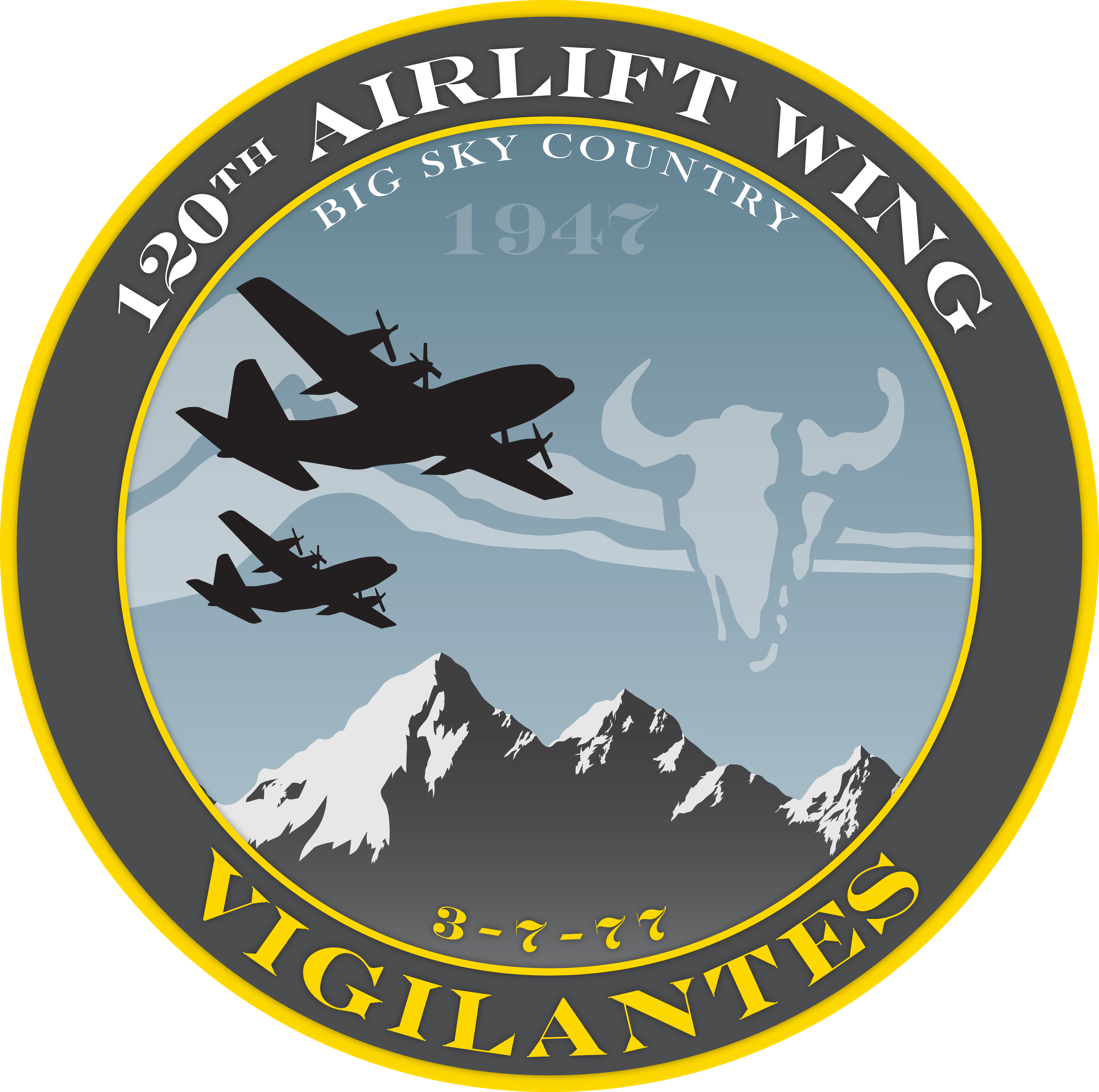
- Emblem of the Montana Air National Guard/120th Airlift Wing

Aircraft flown
- Transport: C-130H Hercules

The Montana Air National Guard (MT ANG) is the aerial militia of the State of Montana, United States of America. It is a reserve of the United States Air Force. Along with the Montana Army National Guard it is an element of the Montana National Guard of the larger United States National Guard Bureau.

As state militia units, the units in the Montana Air National Guard are not in the normal United States Air Force chain of command. They are under the jurisdiction of the governor of Montana through the office of the Montana Adjutant General unless they are federalized by order of the president of the United States. The Montana Air National Guard is headquartered in Great Falls, and its commander is currently Brigadier General Trace N. Thomas.

== Overview ==
Under the "Total Force" concept, Montana Air National Guard units are considered to be Air Reserve Components (ARC) of the United States Air Force (USAF). Montana ANG units are trained and equipped by the Air Force and are operationally gained by a major command of the USAF if federalized. In addition, they are assigned to Air Expeditionary Forces and are subject to deployment tasking orders along with their active duty and Air Force Reserve counterparts in their assigned cycle deployment window.

Along with their federal obligations, Montana ANG elements are subject to activation by the governor to provide protection of life and property, and preserve peace, order and public safety. State missions include disaster relief in times of earthquakes, hurricanes, floods and forest fires, search and rescue, protection of vital public services, and support to civil defense.

== Components ==
The Montana Air National Guard consists of the following major unit:

- 120th Airlift Wing

Established 26 June 1947 (as: 186th Fighter Squadron); operates: C-130J Super Hercules from 2017
Stationed at: Great Falls Air National Guard Base, Great Falls
Gained by: Air Mobility Command

Support Unit Functions and Capabilities:

- 219th RED HORSE Squadron

The mission of the 219th RHS (Rapid Engineer Deployable Heavy Operational Repair Squadron) is to organize, train and equip its 120 personnel for its role as a highly mobile, rapidly deployable, self-sustaining heavy construction and repair unit capable of supporting airpower worldwide and especially in remote and austere operating environments.

== History ==
On 24 May 1946, the United States Army Air Forces, in response to dramatic postwar military budget cuts imposed by President Harry S. Truman, allocated inactive unit designations to the National Guard Bureau for the formation of an Air Force National Guard. These unit designations were allotted and transferred to various State National Guard bureaus to provide them unit designations to re-establish them as Air National Guard units.

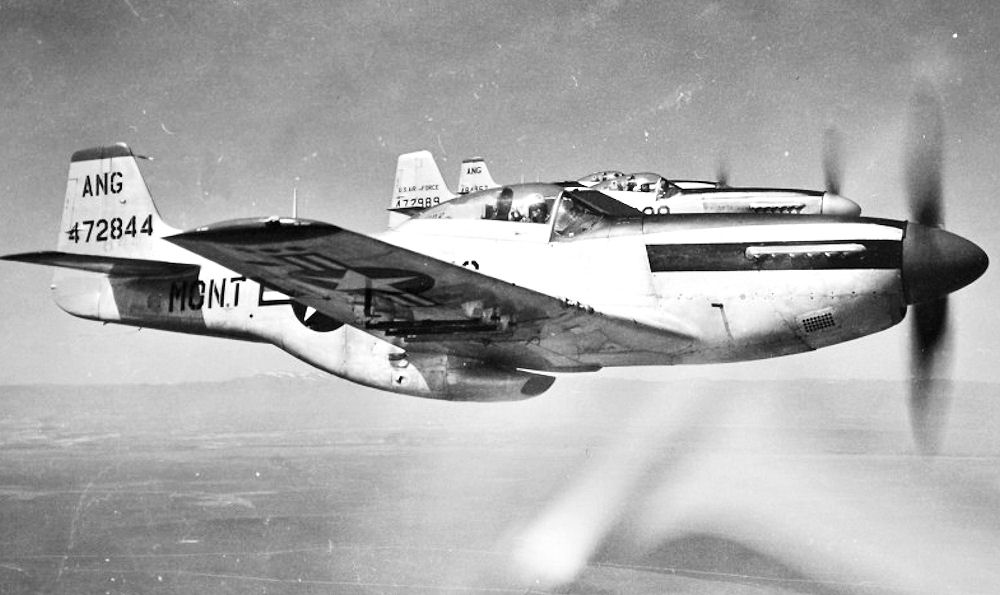
Three North American F-51D Mustangs of the 186th Fighter Squadron in formation, 1948

Lt. Col. Willard Sperry, a decorated combat pilot, began building the Montana Air National Guard at Gore Field, Great Falls. On 27 June 1947, the 186th Fighter Squadron was activated and federally recognized. Within two weeks, six F-51D Mustangs arrived. Its mission was the air defense of the state. 18 September 1947, however, is considered the Montana Air National Guard's official birth concurrent with the establishment of the United States Air Force as a separate branch of the United States military under the National Security Act.

On 1 July 1955 the 186th Fighter-Interceptor Squadron was authorized to expand to a group level, and the 120th Fighter Group (Air Defense) was allotted by the National Guard Bureau, extended federal recognition and activated.

Today the Montana ANG performs an airlift mission, equipped with C-130 Hercules Transport Aircraft.

After the September 11th, 2001 terrorist attacks on the United States, elements of every Air National Guard unit in Montana has been activated in support of the global war on terrorism. Flight crews, aircraft maintenance personnel, communications technicians, air controllers and air security personnel were engaged in Operation Noble Eagle air defense overflights of major United States cities. Also, Montana ANG units have been deployed overseas as part of Operation Enduring Freedom in Afghanistan and Operation Iraqi Freedom in Iraq as well as other locations as directed.

Notable members of the Montana Air National Guard include the likes of champion bowler MSgt Thoroughman, ex-crew chief and Red Dick winner Ed Moyer, and "The Man" Monte Howse.
