= 357th Fighter Squadron =

US Air Force unit

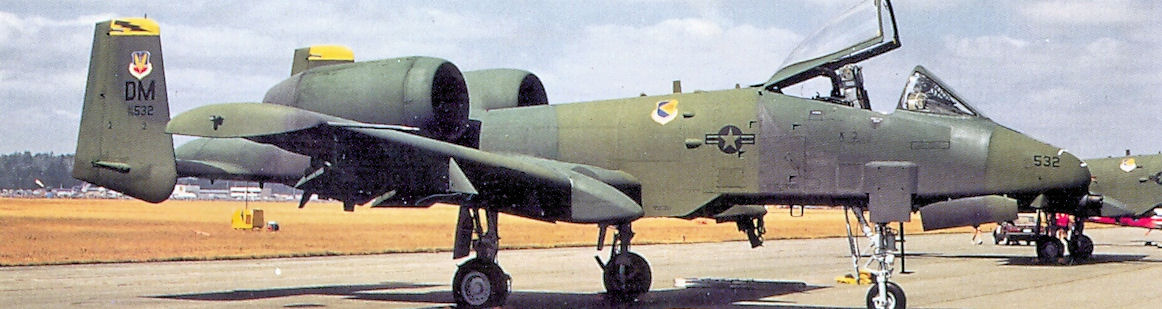
- 357th Fighter Squadron Fairchild Republic A-10 Thunderbolt II 76-0532 at Davis–Monthan AFB, 1991
- Active: 1942–1946; 1952–1960; 1962–1970; 1971–2026
- Country: United States
- Branch: United States Air Force
- Role: Fighter Training
- Nickname: Dragons
- Engagements: European Theater of Operations Vietnam War
- Decorations: Distinguished Unit Citation; Presidential Unit Citation; Air Force Outstanding Unit Award with Combat "V" Device; Republic of Vietnam Gallantry Cross with Palm

Insignia
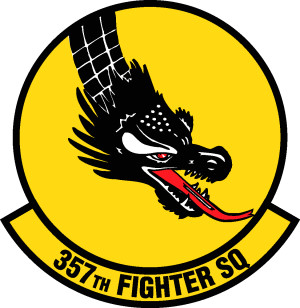
- 357th Fighter Squadron Emblem (Note: Approved 23 January 2008.)

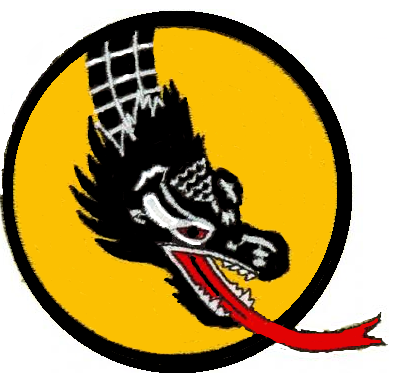
- 357th Fighter Squadron Emblem (Note: Approved 24 June 1943. Description: Over and through a deep yellow disc, piped black, a black striking dragon's head, trimmed white, eye and tongue red.)

The 357th Fighter Squadron is in inactive United States Air Force unit. It was last active at Davis–Monthan Air Force Base, Arizona, where it operated Fairchild Republic A-10 Thunderbolt II aircraft, training pilots for close air support missions.

The squadron was first activated during World War II as a Republic P-47 Thunderbolt fighter squadron. After training in the United States the unit deployed to the European Theater of Operations. The unit entered combat operations in the summer of 1943, continuing in combat until April 1945. It earned a Distinguished Unit Citation for carrying out a difficult attack in April 1944. The squadron moved to Germany, where it was briefly part of the occupation forces before returning to the United States where it was inactivated in November 1945.

== History ==
=== World War II ===
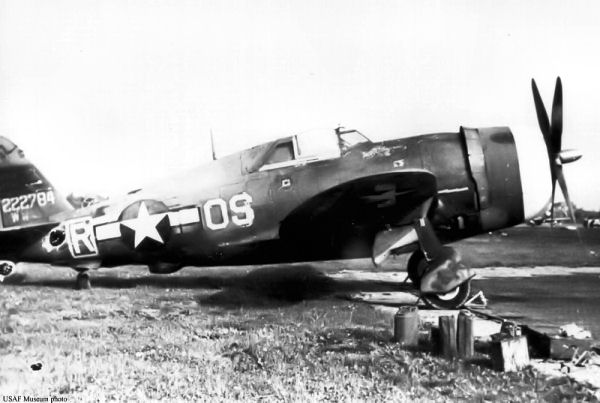
357th Fighter Squadron P-47D Thunderbolt 42-22784

The 357th Fighter Squadron was first activated in late 1942 at Orlando Army Air Base, Florida as one of the original three squadrons of the 355th Fighter Group, flying Republic P-47 Thunderbolts. The squadron trained under III Fighter Command in Florida and in the Middle Atlantic States, then was reassigned as part of I Fighter Command for final training at Philadelphia Municipal Airport, Pennsylvania. The unit also performed air defense in the Philadelphia area in mid-1943.

The 357th deployed to the European Theater of Operations (ETO), where it became part of the 65th Fighter Wing of VIII Fighter Command, Eighth Air Force. The squadron engaged in low-level sweeps over the low countries and Occupied France, attacking enemy airfields and targets of opportunity such as locomotives, bridges, radio stations, and armored cars. Later the squadron served primarily as an escort for Boeing B-17 Flying Fortresses and Consolidated B-24 Liberator heavy bombers of VIII Bomber Command during missions into Germany.

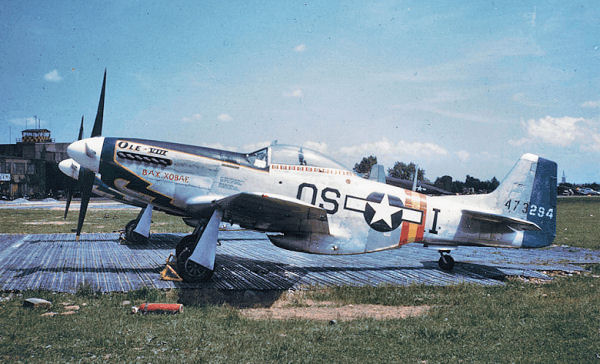
357th Fighter Squadron P-51D Mustang 44-73294 "Ole VIII" with occupation markings, summer 1945

On 5 April 1944, shortly after converting from P-47's to North American P-51 Mustangs, the squadron successfully bombed and strafed German airfields during a snow squall, for which it earned a Distinguished Unit Citation. It provided fighter cover for Allied forces landing in Normandy on 6 June 1944, and afterwards hit transportation facilities to cut enemy supply lines. The unit hit fuel dumps, locomotives, and other targets in support of ground forces during the breakthrough at Saint-Lô in July.

The squadron remained in combat until 25 April 1945. It moved to Occupied Germany as part of the United States Air Forces in Europe for occupation duty at AAF Station Gablingen, Germany, later moving to AAF Station Schweinfurt. The squadron transferred, without personnel and equipment, to Mitchel Field New York on 1 August 1946. It was inactivated on 20 November at Mitchel.

=== Cold War air defense ===
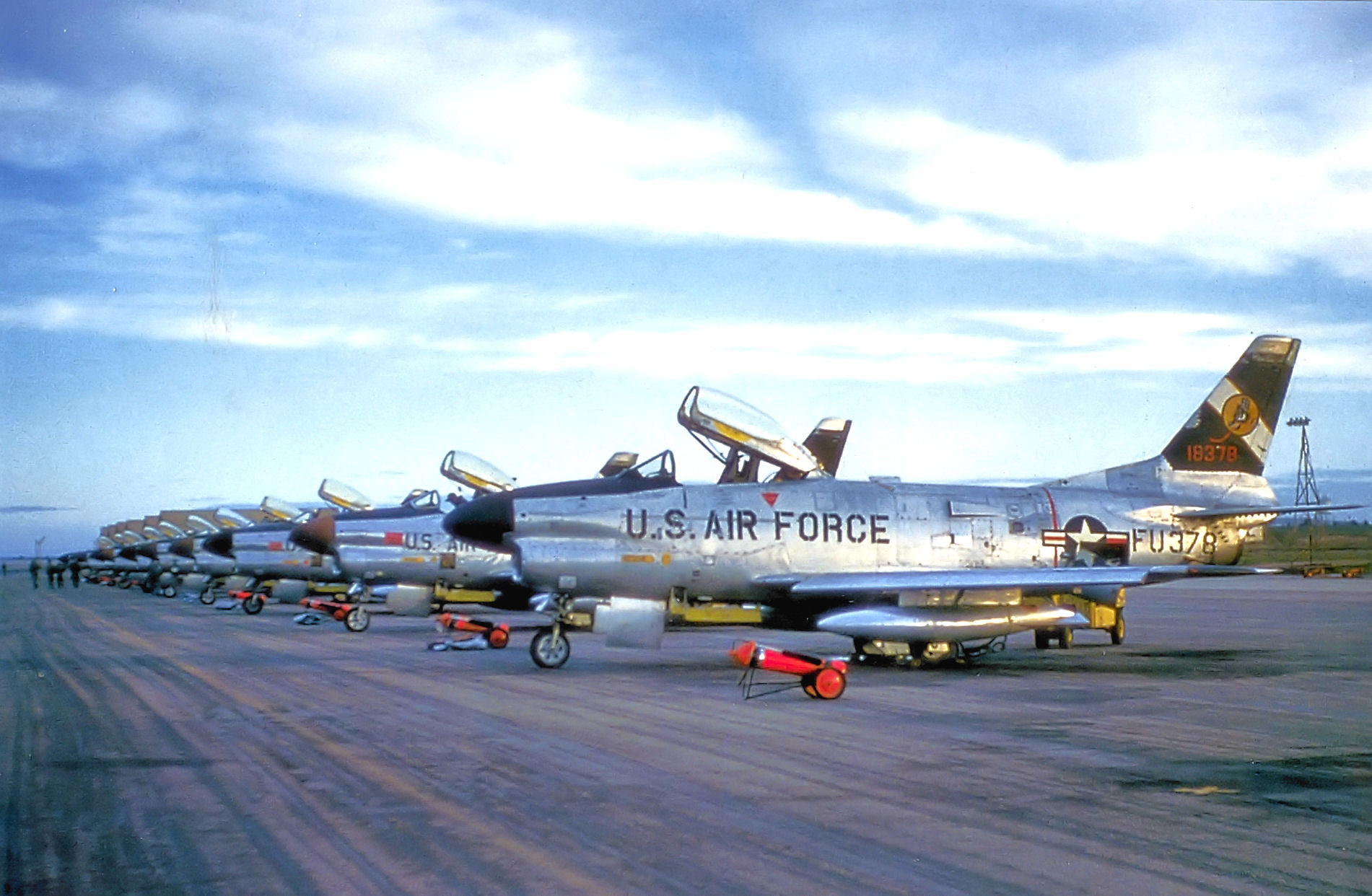
357th FIS F-86D Sabres 51-8378 in foreground.

The squadron was reactivated as the 357th Fighter-Interceptor Squadron under Air Defense Command ADC at Portland International Airport, Oregon in November 1952. The squadron took over the personnel, mission and North American F-86F Sabres of the federalized 123d Fighter-Interceptor Squadron of the Oregon Air National Guard which was returned to state control. A little more than three months later, ADC formed Air Defense Groups at its dispersed fighter bases and the squadron became the operational element of the new 503d Air Defense Group. However, the 503d soon converted to Lockheed F-94 Starfires with the activation of the 497th Fighter-Interceptor Squadron and the 357th deployed to Nouasseur Air Base, French Morocco and assigned to the 316th Air Division of United States Air Forces Europe in May, where it provided air defense mission for Strategic Air Command forward bases used by Boeing B-47 Stratojet aircraft on Operation Reflex deployment to Morocco. Th unit received new Mighty Mouse rocket armed and airborne intercept radar equipped North American F-86D Sabre interceptors in early 1955. The unit remained in North Africa until 1960 when it was inactivated as SAC withdrew from its Morocco bases.

=== Vietnam War ===
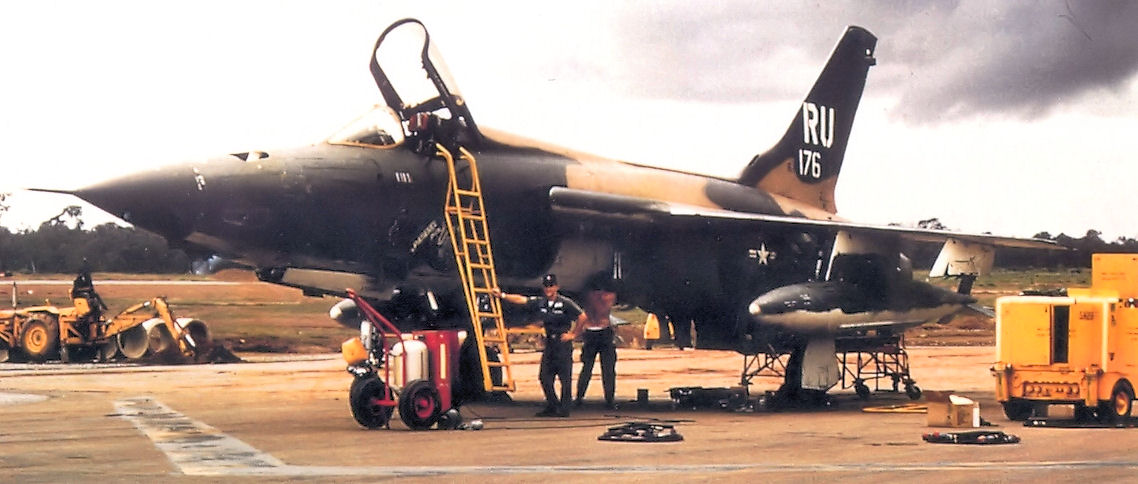
357th Tactical Fighter Squadron F-105D 61-0176, 1969

The 357th was reactivated in July 1962 at George Air Force Base, California as the 357th Tactical Fighter Squadron under the 355th Tactical Fighter Wing and equipped with Republic F-105 Thunderchiefs. After a period of organization at George, the unit moved to McConnell Air Force Base, Kansas in mid-1964.

The squadron deployed for operations under the control of Pacific Air Forces (PACAF), initially operating temporarily from Yokota Air Base, Japan in the fall of 1964, then from Korat Royal Thai Air Force Base, Thailand in early 1965, flying combat missions over South Vietnam in support of the US Advisory forces and friendly South Vietnamese units, returning to McConnell in late 1965. The unit almost immediately re-deployed to Thailand, this time to Takhli Royal Thai Air Force Base in early 1966 as part of the deployment of its parent wing. It became permanently assigned to PACAF's Thirteenth Air Force.

The squadron remained in Thailand engaged in combat operations over Indochina until 1970, flying frequent missions over South and North Vietnam. Its combat actions earned it a Presidential Unit Citation and three Air Force Outstanding Unit Awards with Combat V. It was inactivated at Takhli on 10 December 1970 as part of the drawdown of US Forces in Southeast Asia in the early 1970s.

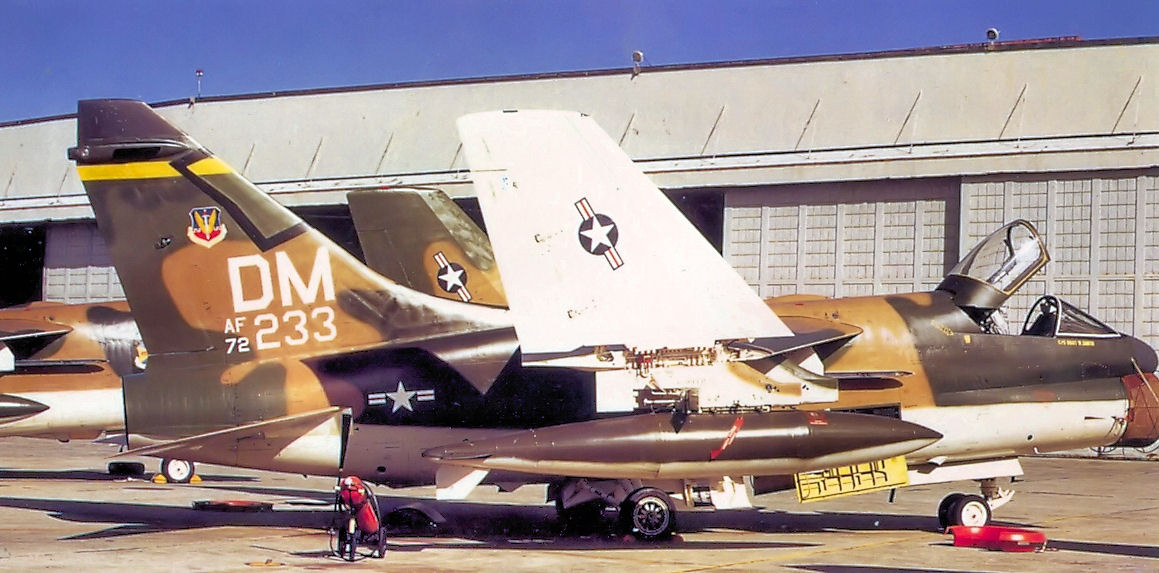
357th TFS A-7D 72-0233 in 1973

The squadron activated briefly at McConnell in March 1971, but moved to Davis–Monthan Air Force Base, Arizona later that month and was reassigned to the reformed 355th Tactical Fighter Wing and equipped with the new Ling-Temco-Vought A-7D Corsair II ground support aircraft. It achieved operationally-ready status in 1972. In late 1972, the unit deployed its Corsairs to Korat RTAFB and was attached to the 354th Tactical Fighter Wing (Forward Echelon), which had deployed to Korat from Myrtle Beach Air Force Base, South Carolina. From Korat, the squadron's aircraft conducted combat operations in South Vietnam, returning to Davis–Monthan in July 1973.

=== Fighter training operations ===
The squadron was redesignated the 357th Tactical Fighter Training Squadron and taken off operational status in 1976, becoming an A-7D Pilot training squadron. It received Fairchild Republic A-10A Thunderbolt IIs in 1979, the replacement for the A-7Ds, and became an A-10 Thunderbolt II Operational Training Unit. In 2000, the squadron added the mission of training instructor pilots in the A-10.

The squadron's last flight of the A-10 was on 29 July 2026 honoring the legacy of the aircraft and its crews as their aircraft are retired and the squadron moves on to support other Air Force requirements. It was inactivated in September 2026.

== Lineage ==
- Constituted as the 357th Fighter Squadron and activated on 12 November 1942

Redesignated 357th Fighter Squadron, Single Engine on 20 August 1943
Inactivated on 20 November 1946
Redesignated 357th Fighter-Interceptor Squadron on 11 September 1952
Activated on 1 November 1952
Discontinued on 8 March 1960
Redesignated 357th Tactical Fighter Squadron on 13 April 1962
Organized on 8 July 1962
Inactivated on 10 December 1970
Activated on 15 March 1971 a-10
Redesignated 357th Tactical Fighter Training Squadron on 1 July 1976
Redesignated 357th Fighter Squadron on 1 November 1991
Inactivated c. 18 September 2026

=== Assignments ===
- 355th Fighter Group, 12 November 1942 – 20 November 1946
- 4704th Defense Wing, 1 November 1952
- 503d Air Defense Group, 16 February 1953
- Seventeenth Air Force, 1 June 1953 (attached to Air Defense Division, Provisional, 8 June 1953 – 17 September 1953
- 316th Air Division, 18 September 1953 – 8 March 1960
- Tactical Air Command, 13 April 1962 (not organized)
- 355th Tactical Fighter Wing, 8 July 1962 (probably attached to 41st Air Division, 9 August 1964 – c. 9 December 1964 and to 6234th Tactical Fighter Wing, 12 June 1965 – 8 November 1965)
- 835th Air Division, 8 November 1965 (attached to 23d Tactical Fighter Wing)
- 355th Tactical Fighter Wing, 29 January 1966 – 10 December 1970
- 23d Tactical Fighter Wing, 15 March 1971
- 4453d Combat Crew Training Wing, 22 March 1971
- 355th Tactical Fighter Wing (later 355th Tactical Training wing, 355th Fighter Wing), 1 July 1971
- 355th Operations Group, 1 May 1992 – c. 18 September 2026

=== Stations ===
- Orlando Army Air Base, Florida, 12 November 1942
- Norfolk Municipal Airport, Virginia, 18 February 1943
- Langley Field, Virginia, 4 March 1943
- Millville Army Airfield, New Jersey, 27 April 1943
- Philadelphia Municipal Airport, Pennsylvania, 17 May 1943 – 16 June 1943
- RAF Steeple Morden (AAF-122), England, 8 July 1943
- AAF Station Gablingen (R-77), Germany, 17 July 1945
- AAF Station Schweinfurt (R-25), Germany, 15 April 1946
- Mitchel Field, New York, 1 August 1946 – 20 November 1946
- Portland International Airport (later Portland Air Force Base), Oregon, 1 November 1952 – 14 March 1953

- Nouasseur Air Base, French Morocco (later, Morocco), 28 May 1953 – 8 March 1960
- George Air Force Base, CA, 8 July 1962
- McConnell Air Force Base, KS, 21 July 1964 (deployed at Yokota Air Base, Japan, c. 9 August 1964 – c. 9 December- 1964 and at Korat Royal Thai Air Force Base, Thailand, c. 12 June 1965 – c. 8 November 1965)
- Takhli Royal Thai Air Force Base, Thailand, 29 January 1966 – 10 December 1970
- McConnell Air Force Base, Kansas, 15 March 1971
- Davis–Monthan Air Force Base, Arizona, 22 March 1971 – c. 18 September 2026

=== Aircraft ===
- Republic P-47 Thunderbolt (1943–1944)
- North American P-51 Mustang (1944–1946)
- North American F-86F Sabre (1952–1955)
- North American F-86D Sabre (1955–1960)
- Republic F-105 Thunderchief (1962–1970)
- McDonnell F-4 Phantom II (1971)
- Ling-Temco-Vought A-7 Corsair II (1971–1979)
- Fairchild Republic A-10 Thunderbolt II (1979 – 2026)

=== Awards and campaigns ===
Award streamer	Award	Dates	Notes
	Distinguished Unit Citation	5 April 1944	357th Fighter Squadron
	Presidential Unit Citation	11 June 1965-21 November 1965	357th Tactical Fighter Squadron
	Presidential Unit Citation	29 January 1966-10 October 1955	357th Tactical Fighter Squadron
	Presidential Unit Citation	11 August 1967-12 August 1967; 24 October 1967 – 28 October 1967	357th Tactical Fighter Squadron
	Presidential Unit Citation	12 April 1968-30 April 1969	357th Tactical Fighter Squadron
	Air Force Outstanding Unit Award w/Combat "V" Device	12 October 1966-11 April 1967	357th Tactical Fighter Squadron
	Air Force Outstanding Unit Award w/Combat "V" Device	12 April 1967-11 April 1968	357th Tactical Fighter Squadron
	Air Force Outstanding Unit Award w/Combat "V" Device	1 July 1969-24 November 1970	357th Tactical Fighter Squadron
	Air Force Outstanding Unit Award	1 July 1971-1 June 1973	357th Tactical Fighter Squadron
	Air Force Outstanding Unit Award	1 October 1976-30 May 1978	357th Tactical Fighter Training Squadron
	Air Force Outstanding Unit Award	1 January 1991-31 December 1992	357th Tactical Fighter Training Squadron (later 357th Fighter Squadron)
	Air Force Outstanding Unit Award	1 June 1995-31 May 1997	357th Fighter Squadron
	Air Force Outstanding Unit Award	1 June 1998-31 May 2000	357th Fighter Squadron
	Air Force Outstanding Unit Award	1 June 2002–31 May 2004	357th Fighter Squadron
	Air Force Outstanding Unit Award	1 June 2004–31 May 2006	357th Fighter Squadron
	Air Force Outstanding Unit Award	1 June 2007–31 May 2009	357th Fighter Squadron
	Republic of Viet Nam Gallantry Cross w/Palm	1 April 1966-10 December 1970	357th Tactical Fighter Squadron

Campaign Streamer	Campaign	Dates	Notes
	Air Offensive, Europe		357th Fighter Squadron
	Normandy		357th Fighter Squadron
	Northern France		357th Fighter Squadron
	Rhineland		357th Fighter Squadron
	Ardennes-Alsace		357th Fighter Squadron
	Central Europe		357th Fighter Squadron
	Air Combat, EAME Theater		357th Fighter Squadron
	Vietnam Defensive		357th Tactical Fighter Squadron
	Vietnam Air		357th Tactical Fighter Squadron
	Vietnam Air Offensive		357th Tactical Fighter Squadron
	Vietnam Air Offensive, Phase II		357th Tactical Fighter Squadron
	Vietnam Air Offensive, Phase III		357th Tactical Fighter Squadron
	Vietnam Air/Ground		357th Tactical Fighter Squadron
	Vietnam Air Offensive, Phase IV		357th Tactical Fighter Squadron
	Tet 1969 Counteroffensive		357th Tactical Fighter Squadron
	Vietnam Summer-Fall 1969		357th Tactical Fighter Squadron
	Vietnam Winter-Spring 1970		357th Tactical Fighter Squadron
	Sanctuary Counteroffensive		357th Tactical Fighter Squadron
	Southwest Monsoon		357th Tactical Fighter Squadron

== See also ==
- List of A-7 Corsair II operators
- List of F-4 Phantom II operators
- List of F-105 units of the United States Air Force
- List of F-86 Sabre units
