= 497th Combat Training Flight =

497th Combat Training Flight

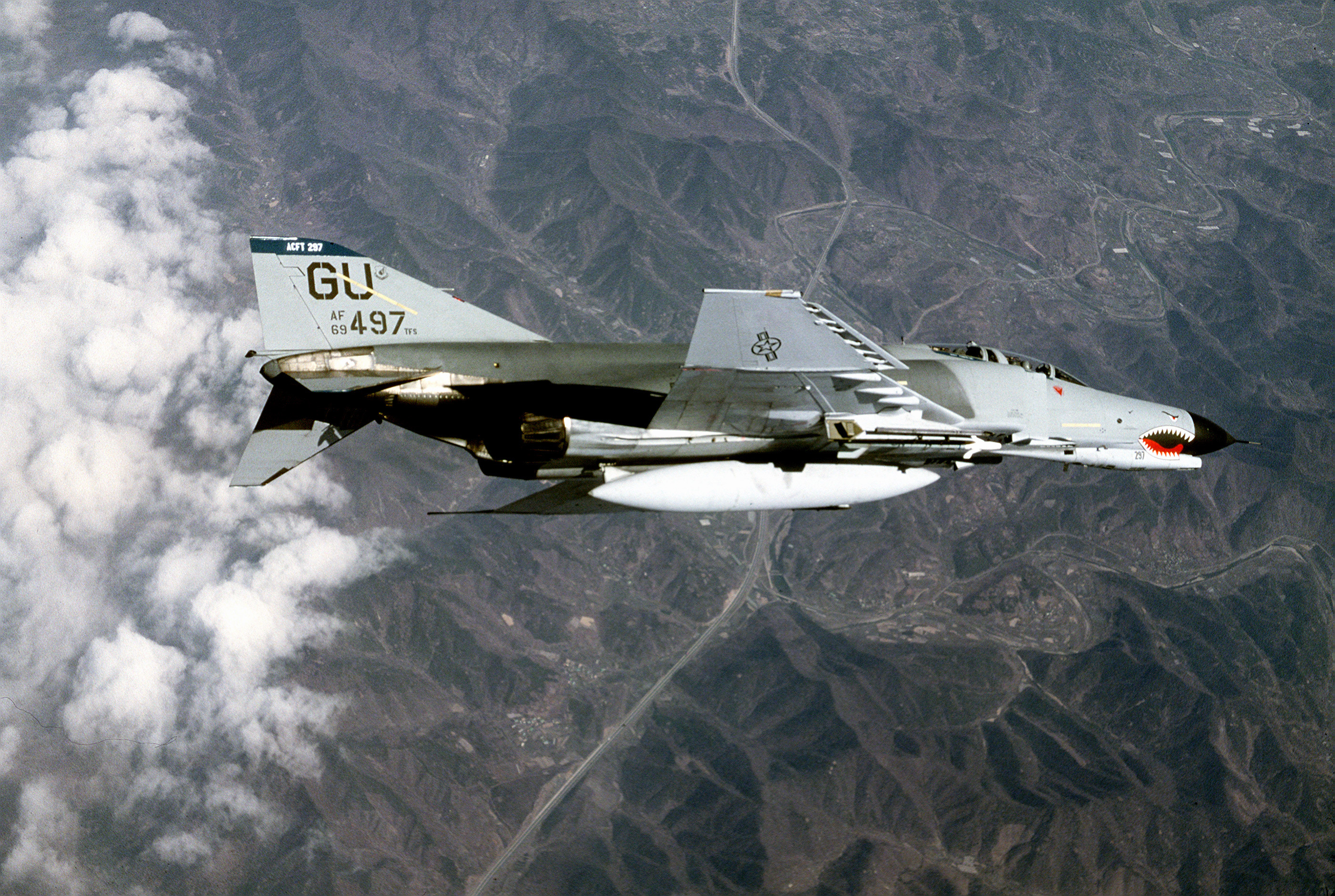
- A 497th F-4E Phantom II over Korea in 1986
- Active: 1942–1944; 1953–1974; 1978–1989; 1991–present
- Country: United States
- Branch: United States Air Force
- Role: Combat Training
- Part of: Pacific Air Forces
- Garrison/HQ: Paya Lebar Air Base, Singapore
- Nickname: Night Owls
- Mottos: Train Hard, Fight Easy
- Decorations: Presidential Unit Citation Air Force Outstanding Unit Award with Combat "V" Device Air Force Outstanding Unit Award Vietnamese Gallantry Cross with Palm

Insignia
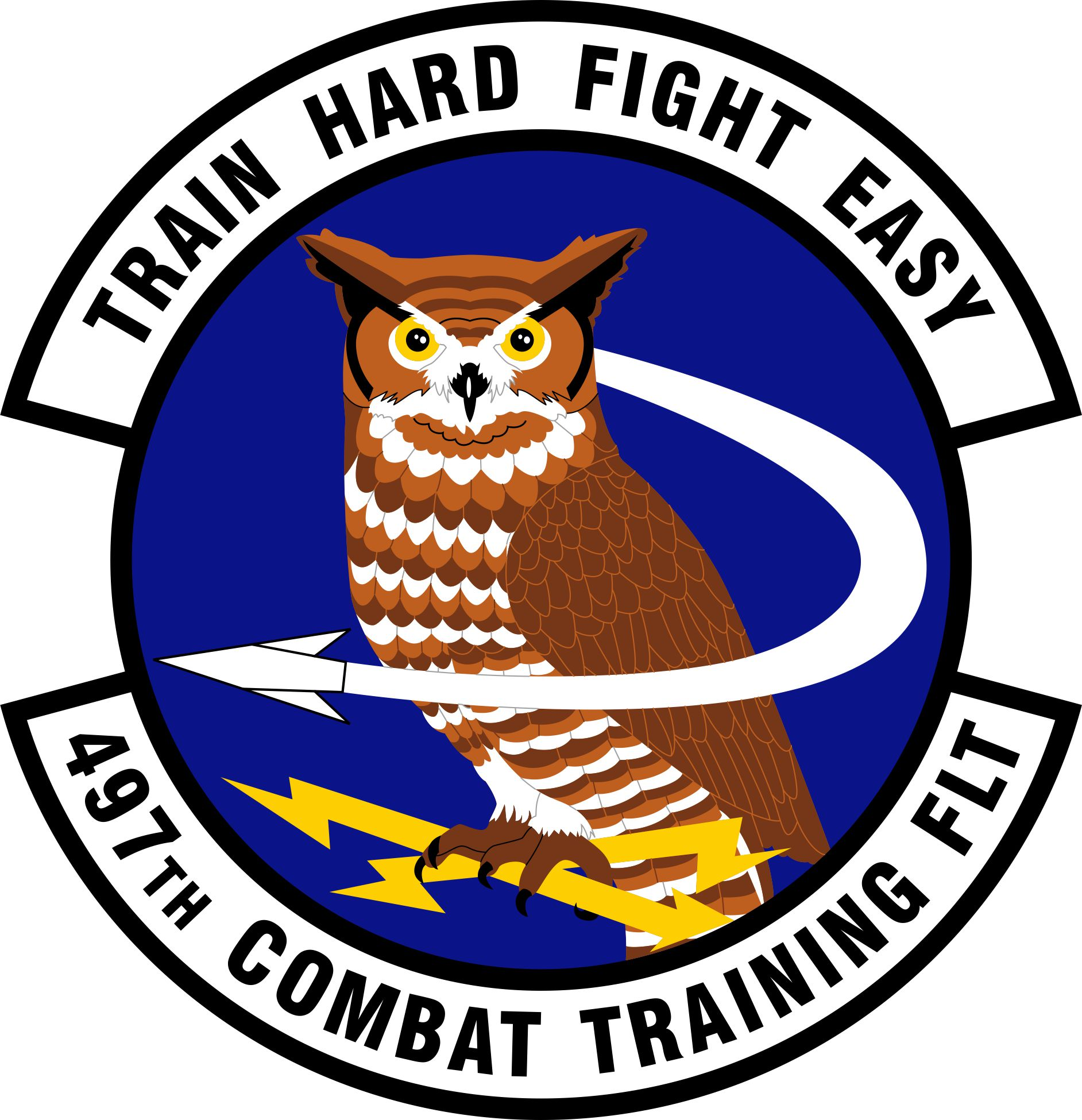
- 497th Combat Training Flight emblem (Note: Approved 18 February 2021.)

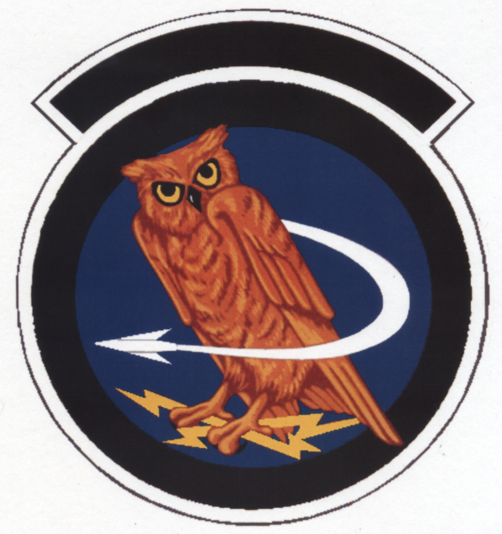
- 497th Tactical Fighter Squadron emblem (Note: Approved 28 September 1971.)

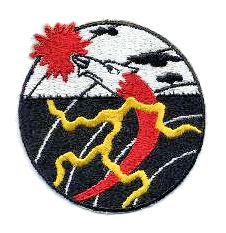
- Patch with 497th Fighter-Interceptor Squadron emblem (Note: Approved 11 October 1956. Description: On a disc horizontally divided white and black within a narrow black border a red curved sweep with white figurehead outlined in black with black nose issuing from base to chief. In upper left and extending beyond border a red flash explosion. In base and in front of red sweep a yellow lightning flash reaching out in four directions. In upper portion three dark grey cloud formations; all in front of curved black and white counterchanged radar waves reaching throughout from lower right to upper left.)

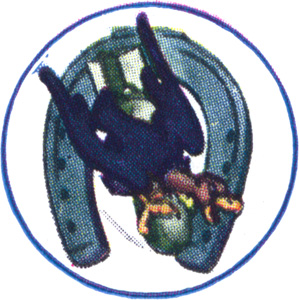
- 497th Fighter-Bomber Squadron emblem

The 497th Combat Training Flight is a United States Air Force unit stationed at Paya Lebar Air Base, where its mission is to provide operational and logistical support to United States Air Force aircraft deployed to Singapore for training exercises with the Republic of Singapore Air Force.

The squadron was first activated in 1942 as the 302nd Bombardment Squadron and served as a training unit for single engine bomber crews, and later as the 497th Fighter-Bomber Squadron, for fighter pilots until being disbanded in 1944 in a general reorganization of Army Air Forces training units.

It was reconstituted in 1953 as the 497th Fighter-Interceptor Squadron and served as an air defense unit in the western United States until 1958, when it moved to Spain, where it performed the same mission until 1964. After returning to the United States as a paper unit, it began to train and reorganize with McDonnell F-4 Phantom IIs as the 497th Tactical Fighter Squadron. In December 1965, it moved to Thailand and began combat operations. In 1968, the squadron became a specialized night Fast Forward Air Control unit. It continued in combat until the summer of 1973, earning three Presidential Unit Citations. As the United States withdrew forces from Thailand, it was inactivated in September 1974.

From 1978 to 1988, the squadron was again active with F-4 Phantoms in South Korea. It was activated in its current role in 1991 as the 497th Fighter Training Squadron.

== Mission ==
The squadron supports/participates in regional exercises and global contingencies, and provides housing; morale, recreation and welfare facilities and programs: medical services; force protection to resources and personnel; and legal, financial, communications, and contracting support to assigned and deployed personnel. The 497th commander is also the designated commanding officer for the Uniform Code of Military Justice for U.S. military personnel in nine Southeast Asian countries.

== History ==
=== World War II ===
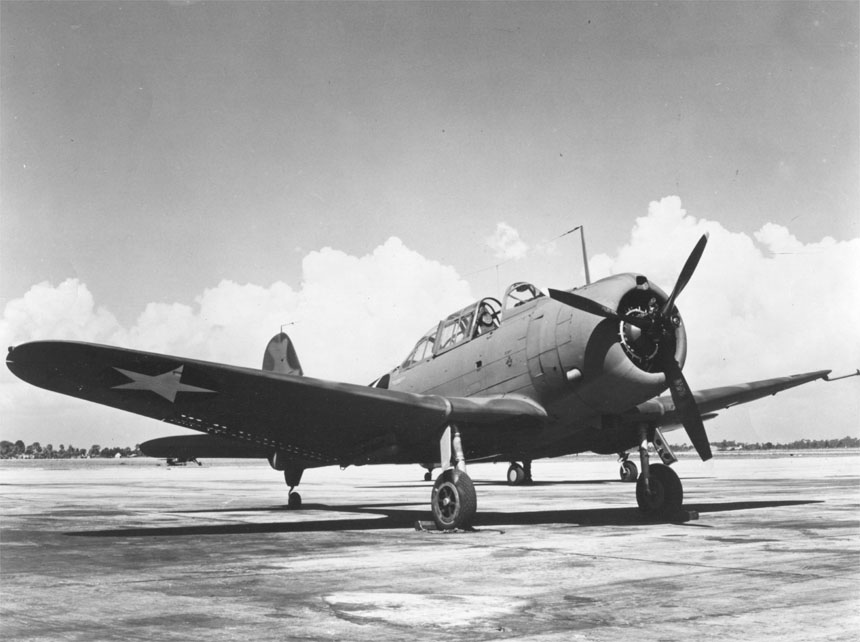
A-24 Banshee as flown by the squadron

The squadron was activated in 1942 as the 302nd Bombardment Squadron (Light) at Savannah Air Base, Georgia, and equipped with Douglas A-24 Banshee dive bombers as one of the original squadrons of the 84th Bombardment Group. It received its initial cadre and equipment from the 3d Bombardment Group. It operated briefly with Vultee V-72 (A-31 Vengeance) aircraft, but its operations showed this aircraft was unsuitable for dive bombing. The squadron served as an Operational Training Unit (OTU), equipping with Douglas A-24 Banshees and Bell P-39 Airacobras.

The OTU program involved the use of an oversized parent unit to provide cadres to “satellite groups " The OTU program was patterned after the unit training system of the Royal Air Force. After forming the satellite groups, the parent unit assumed responsibility for satellite training and oversaw its expansion with graduates of Army Air Forces Training Command schools to become effective combat units. Phase I training concentrated on individual training in crewmember specialties. Phase II training emphasized the coordination for the crew to act as a team. The final phase concentrated on operation as a unit. The squadron contributed to the 84th Group's role as the parent for elements of several light bombardment groups. (Note: These units were the 85th, 311th, 312th, 319th, 405th and 407th Bombardment Groups.)

In August 1943, the squadron was redesignated the 497th Fighter-Bomber Squadron as were other Army Air Forces (AAF) single engine bombardment units, and was re-equipped with Republic P-47 Thunderbolts. It continued to serve as an OTU until October 1943. During the fall of 1943, operations dwindled and by the end of September 1943 only five aircraft were assigned to the entire 84th Group.

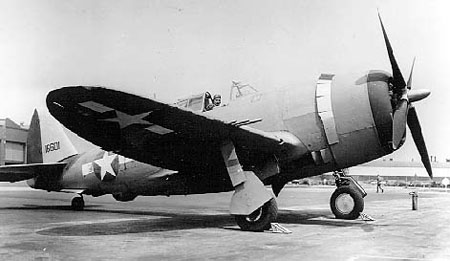
P-47 Thunderbolt

In October 1943, the squadron moved to Harding Field, Louisiana, where it became a Replacement Training Unit (RTU) and also participated occasionally in demonstrations and maneuvers. RTUs were also oversized units, but with the mission of training individual pilots or aircrews. However, the AAF found that standard military units, based on relatively inflexible tables of organization were not proving well adapted to the training mission. Accordingly, it adopted a more functional system in which each base was organized into a separate numbered unit. The squadron was, therefore, disbanded in April 1944 and replaced by the 263rd AAF Base Unit (Combat Crew Training School, Fighter), which took over the personnel, equipment and mission of the 84th Group and supporting units at Harding Field.

=== Cold War air defense ===
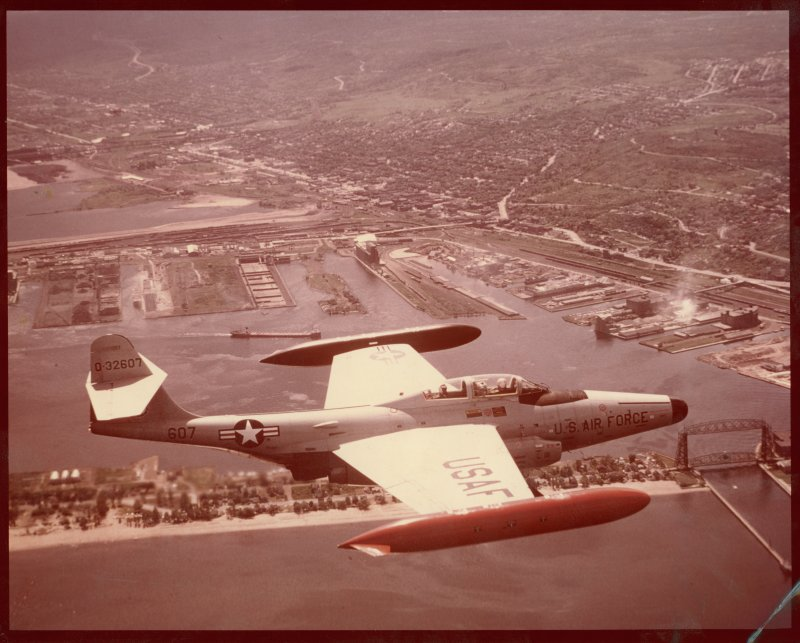
F-89D Scorpion as flown by the squadron

The squadron was reconstituted as the 497th Fighter-Interceptor Squadron and activated in February 1953 at Portland Air Force Base, Oregon, where it was assigned to the 503d Air Defense Group. The squadron was originally equipped with Lockheed F-94B Starfires, armed with 20mm cannon, but by the end of the year, replaced them with F-94As. The squadron converted to Northrop F-89D Scorpions, armed with Folding-Fin Aerial Rockets by July 1954.

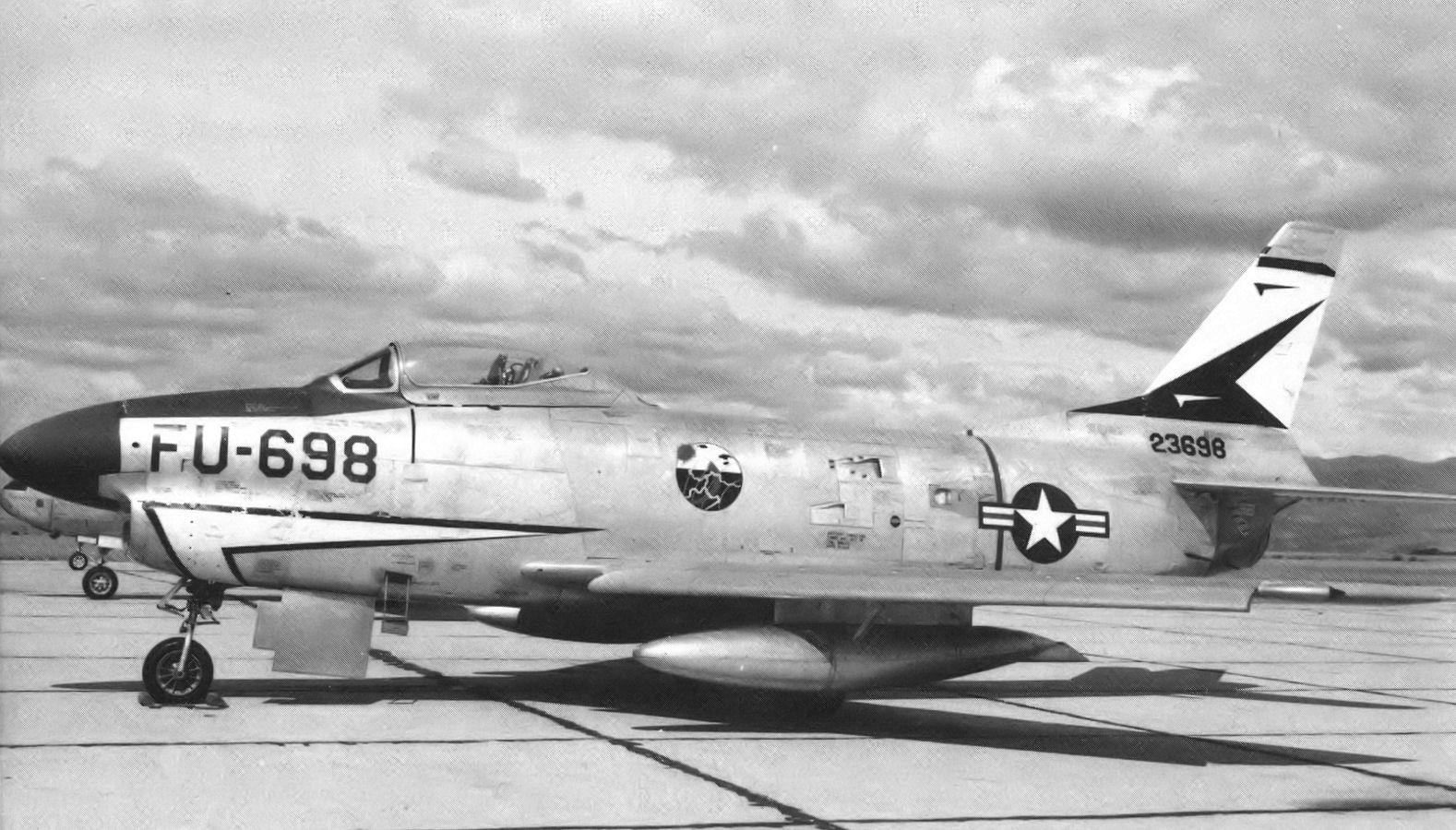
F-86D Sabre at Geiger Field in 1955 (Note: Airplane is North American F-86D-40-NA Sabre, erial 52–3698.)

In August 1955, Air Defense Command (ADC) implemented Project Arrow, which was designed to bring back on the active list the fighter units which had compiled memorable records in the two world wars. In this reorganization, the 337th Fighter Group replaced the 503rd Air Defense Group at Portland and the squadron transferred its mission, personnel and F-89s to the 337th's 460th Fighter-Interceptor Squadron, which moved to Portland on paper from McGhee-Tyson Airport, Tennessee. Simultaneously, the 497th moved to Geiger Field, Washington, where it assumed the personnel and North American F-86D Sabres of the 445th Fighter-Interceptor Squadron and was again assigned to the 84th Fighter Group.

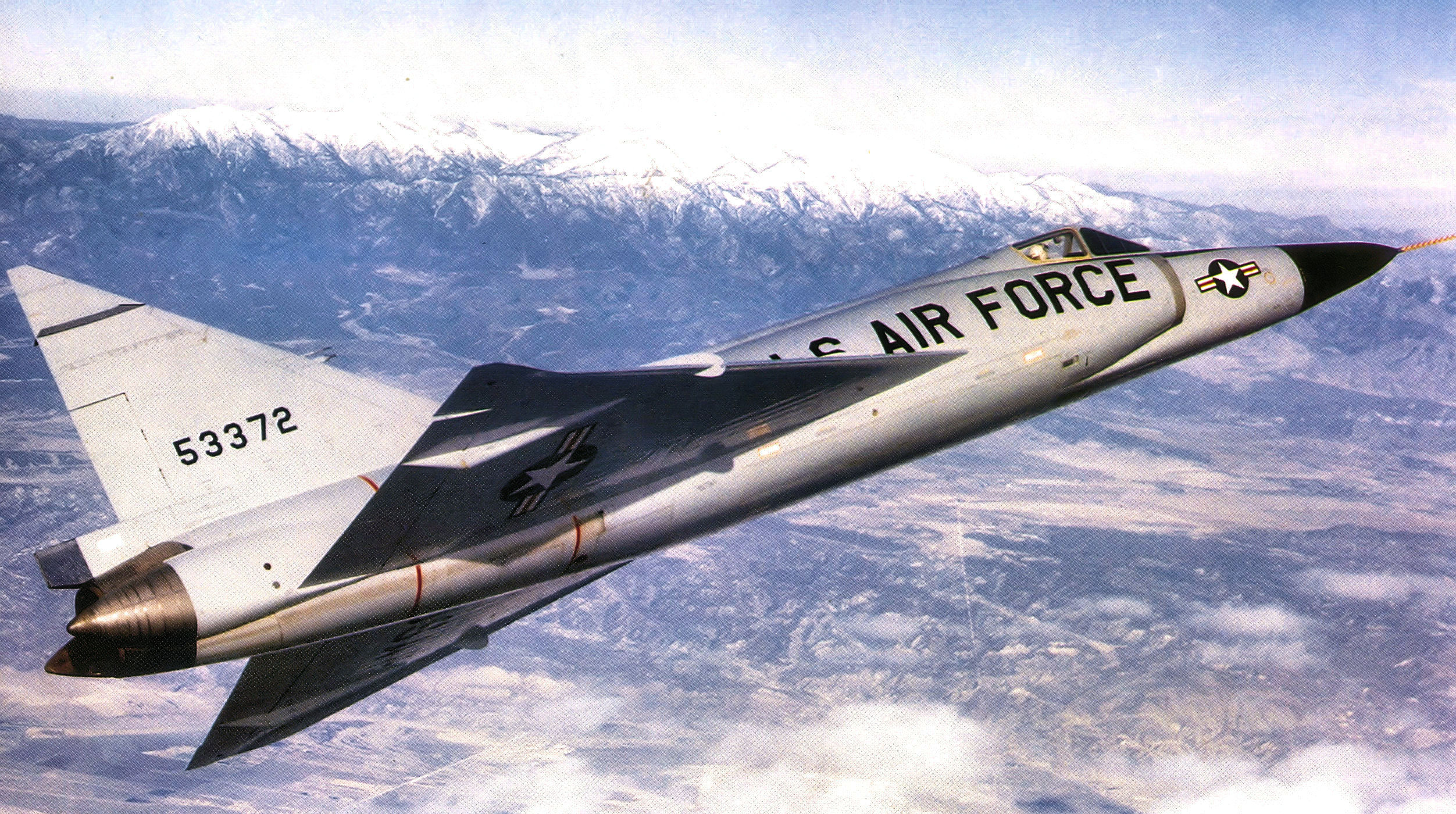
F-102A Delta as flown by the squadron

In June 1958, the squadron moved to Torrejon Air Base, Spain, where it was assigned to the 65th Air Division of Strategic Air Command the following month. It continued to fly Sabres until 1960, when it converted to the data link equipped and AIM-4 Falcon armed Convair F-102 Delta Dagger, On 1 July 1960, United States Air Forces Europe assumed responsibility for United States air defense in Spain, and the squadron was reassigned to it, although it remained attached to 65th Air Division. While flying Deuces at Torrejon, the squadron was twice a runner-up for the Hughes Trophy (1961 and 1962), and won the trophy for most outstanding performance as an air defense squadron in 1963. Headquarters, United States Air Force implemented Project Clearwater in 1964. Clearwater called for the return of overseas based F-102s. The original plan called for the inactivation of the 497th and dispersing its aircraft to ADC interceptor squadrons in the US. Instead, it was decided to use the overseas interceptor squadrons as the elements of the 32d Tactical Fighter Wing, which was forming at George Air Force Base, California.

=== Vietnam War ===
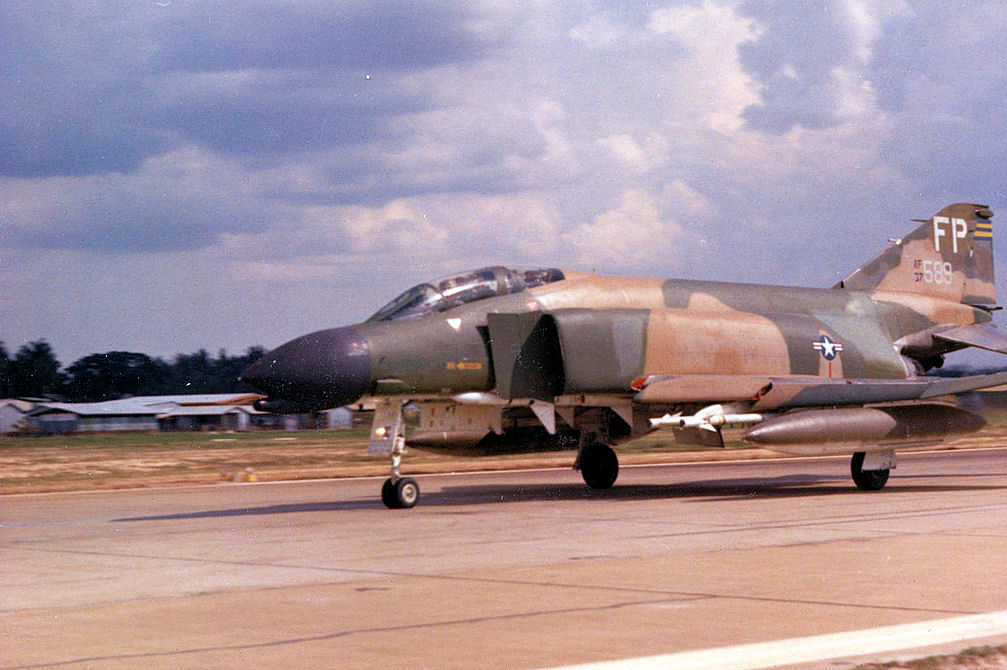
497 F-4 Phantom rolls out for takeoff at Ubon RTAFB (Note: Aircraft is McDonnell F-4C-19-MC Phantom II, serial 63-7589. The plane is configured for the MIGCAP escort role with AIM-7 Sparrow air-to-air missiles under the fuselage, and AIM-9 Sidewinder air-to-air missiles and extra fuel tanks under the wings. This plane's crew shot down a MiG-21 on 2 January 1967. It was transferred to the Air National Guard in 1983, and to the Aerospace Maintenance and Regeneration Center on 21 January 1987, and then to Tolicha Peak Electronic Range, Nevada as a target. Dirkx, Marco (21 June 2025). "1963 USAF Serial Numbers". Joe Baugher’s Serial Number List.)

The squadron moved on paper to George on 18 June 1964, but its assignment to the 32nd Wing lasted little over a month, transferring to the 8th Tactical Fighter Wing, which replaced the 32nd, which was still organizing, on 25 July. For the next year and a half, the squadron trained with McDonnell F-4 Phantom IIs and participated in numerous exercises. In December 1965, the 8th Wing moved to Ubon Royal Thai Air Force Base, Thailand, followed two days later by the 497th. Initial combat operations included armed reconnaissance, air support, bombing, air interdiction and air defense.

North Vietnamese logistics movement along the Ho Chi Minh Trail had become almost exclusively night operations. Accordingly, in support of Operation Commando Hunt, the 497th was tasked to act as nighttime Fast Forward Air Control (FAC)s controlling night strikes in Laos, particularly near the Mu Gia Pass and Ban Karai Pass, which were choke points, in what were called "Night Owl" missions. The squadron flew its first Night Owl mission on 18 October 1969. (Note: "Abstract, History 8 Tactical Fighter Wing Jan-Jun 1966". Air Force History Index. reports Night Owl missions during the first half of 1966,) Night Owl missions involve flying individual sorties over areas of enemy activity to either strike them or call in additional aircraft to destroy the targets they identified. Squadron F-4s would drop flares, mark targets, and control strikes illuminated by the flares. The squadron typically launched 8 to 12 sorties nightly to provide coverage of potential targets from dusk until dawn.

The 8th Wing continued combat operations in Southeast Asia until August 1973, but afterwards remained in Thailand, flying training missions and maintaining the capability to resume combat operations. In mid-1974 it began to draw down, flying its last F-4 mission in July 1974. On 16 September, the squadron was inactivated as other wing elements moved on paper to Korea.

=== Tactical fighter operations in Korea ===
The squadron was once more activated at Taegu Air Base, South Korea in October 1978. For the next ten years it was an element providing for the defense of South Korea. It trained to remain proficient in close air support, interdiction, and air-to-air combat skills. The squadron was inactivated in January 1989.

=== Current operations ===
The squadron was redesignated the 497th Fighter Training Squadron and activated at Paya Lebar Airbase, Singapore under Thirteenth Air Force to conduct combat training. In 1994, it was renamed the 497th Combat Training Squadron and in 2006 it was reduced in size to a flight. Since then, it has been assigned to the 36th Operations Group, which is located at Andersen Air Force Base, Guam

The 497th organization includes the functional elements of a small-scale wing – operations, flightline logistics, community and mission support, and medical services. With a small staff, it is the entire permanent USAF presence in Singapore. When so configured, the flight conducts air-to-air combat training with the Republic of Singapore Air Force in exercises titled Exercise Commando Sling. While Commando Sling is normally a bilateral air-to-air combat exercise, but it has been expanded on occasion to include the Royal Australian Air Force.

The flight's base support functions are located at Sembawang Air Base, where it is a tenant under Naval Region Singapore. (Note: Most of the material on the organization as a combat training unit deleted from previous version of this page was cut and pasted from the GlobalSecurity site in External links. Much of the uncited material in that section appears on this site as well.)

== Lineage ==
- Constituted as the 302d Bombardment Squadron (Light) on 13 January 1942
- Activated on 10 February 1942

Redesignated 302d Bombardment Squadron (Dive) on 27 July 1942
Redesignated 497th Fighter-Bomber Squadron on 10 August 1943

- Disbanded on 1 April 1944
- Reconstituted on 3 February 1953 and redesignated 497th Fighter-Interceptor Squadron
- Activated on 18 February 1953

Redesignated 497th Tactical Fighter Squadron on 25 July 1964

- Inactivated on 16 September 1974
- Activated on 1 October 1978
- Inactivated on 24 January 1989

Redesignated 497th Fighter Training Squadron on 28 October 1991

- Activated on 31 October 1991

Redesignated 497th Combat Training Squadron on 1 August 1994
Redesignated 497th Combat Training Flight on 26 October 2006

=== Assignments ===
- 84th Bombardment Group (later 84th Fighter-Bomber Group), 10 February 1942 – 1 April 1944
- 503d Air Defense Group, 18 February 1953
- 84th Fighter Group, 18 August 1955
- 65th Air Division, 5 July 1958
- United States Air Forces Europe (attached to 65th Air Division), 1 July 1960
- 32d Tactical Fighter Wing. 18 June 1964
- 8th Tactical Fighter Wing, 25 July 1964
- 831st Air Division, 6 December 1965 (attached to 479th Tactical Fighter Wing)
- 8th Tactical Fighter Wing, 8 December 1965 – 16 September 1974
- 8th Tactical Fighter Wing, 1 October 1978
- 51st Composite Wing (later 51st Tactical Fighter Wing), 1 January 1982 – 1 January 1988
- Thirteenth Air Force, 31 October 1991
- 36th Air Base Wing, 30 June 2005
- 36th Operations Group, 15 March 2006 – present

=== Stations ===
- Savannah Air Base, Georgia, 10 February 1942
- Drew Field, Florida, 7 February 1943
- Harding Field, Louisiana, 4 October 1943 – 1 April 1944
- Portland Air Force Base, Oregon, 18 February 1953
- Geiger Field, Washington, 18 August 1955
- Torrejon Air Base, Spain, 21 June 1958
- George Air Force Base, California, 18 June 1964
- Ubon Royal Thai Air Force Base, Thailand, 8 December 1965
- Taegu Air Base, South Korea, 1 October 1978 – 24 January 1989
- Paya Lebar Airbase, Singapore, 31 October 1991 – present

=== Aircraft ===
- Vultee V-72 Vengeance, 1942
- Douglas A-24 Banshee, 1942–1943
- Bell P-39 Airacobra, 1943
- Republic P-47 Thunderbolt, 1943–1944
- Lockheed F-94B Starfire, 1953
- Lockheed F-94A Starfire, 1953–1954
- Northrop F-89D Scorpion, 1954–1955
- North American F-86D Sabre, 1955–1960
- Convair F-102 Delta Dagger, 1960–1964
- McDonnell F-4 Phantom II, 1964–1974; 1978–1988

=== Awards and campaigns ===
Award streamer	Award	Dates	Notes
	Presidential Unit Citation	16 December 1966-2 January 1967	Southeast Asia, 497th Tactical Fighter Squadron
	Presidential Unit Citation	1 March 1967-31 March 1968	Southeast Asia, 497th Tactical Fighter Squadron
	Presidential Unit Citation	1 January-1 April 1971	Southeast Asia, 497th Tactical Fighter Squadron
	Air Force Outstanding Unit Award with Combat "V" Device	16 December 1965-15 December 1966	497th Tactical Fighter Squadron
	Air Force Outstanding Unit Award with Combat "V" Device	16 December 1965-15 December 1966	497th Tactical Fighter Squadron
	Air Force Outstanding Unit Award with Combat "V" Device	1 April-30 September 1968	497th Tactical Fighter Squadron
	Air Force Outstanding Unit Award with Combat "V" Device	1 January-31 December 1970	497th Tactical Fighter Squadron
	Air Force Outstanding Unit Award with Combat "V" Device	1 October 1971-31 March 1972	497th Tactical Fighter Squadron
	Air Force Outstanding Unit Award with Combat "V" Device	1 April-22 October 1972	497th Tactical Fighter Squadron
	Air Force Outstanding Unit Award with Combat "V" Device	18 December 1972-15 August 1973	497th Tactical Fighter Squadron
	Air Force Outstanding Unit Award	20 March 1961-9 February 1962	497th Fighter-Interceptor Squadron
	Air Force Outstanding Unit Award	1 April 1983-30 April 1984	497th Tactical Fighter Squadron
	Air Force Outstanding Unit Award	1 May 1984-30 April 1985	497th Tactical Fighter Squadron
	Air Force Outstanding Unit Award	1 July 1985-30 June 1987	497th Tactical Fighter Squadron
	Air Force Outstanding Unit Award	[31 October 1991]-1 August 1992	497th Fighter Training Squadron
	Air Force Outstanding Unit Award	1 January 1996-31 December 1997	497th Combat Training Squadron
	Air Force Outstanding Unit Award	1 October 2000-30 September 2002	497th Combat Training Squadron
	Air Force Outstanding Unit Award	1 November 2002-31 October 2004	497th Combat Training Squadron
	Air Force Outstanding Unit Award	30 June-30 September 2005	497th Combat Training Squadron
	Air Force Outstanding Unit Award	1 October 2005-30 September 2007	497th Combat Training Squadron (later 497th Combat Training Flight)
	Air Force Outstanding Unit Award	1 October 2009-30 September 2011	497th Combat Training Flight
	Vietnamese Gallantry Cross with Palm	1 Apr 1966-28 Jan 1973	497th Tactical Fighter Squadron

Campaign Streamer	Campaign	Dates	Notes
	American Theater without inscription	10 February 1942–1 April 1944	302nd Bombardment Squadron (later 497th Fighter-Bomber Squadron)
	Vietnam Defensive	8 December 1965–30 January 1966	497th Tactical Fighter Squadron
	Vietnam Air	31 January 1966–28 June 1966	497th Tactical Fighter Squadron
	Vietnam Air Offensive	29 June 1966–8 March 1967	497th Tactical Fighter Squadron
	Vietnam Air Offensive, Phase II	9 March 1967–31 March 1968	497th Tactical Fighter Squadron
	Vietnam Air/Ground	22 January 1968–7 July 1968	497th Tactical Fighter Squadron
	Vietnam Air Offensive, Phase III	1 April 1968–31 October 1968	497th Tactical Fighter Squadron
	Vietnam Air Offensive, Phase IV	1 November 1968–22 February 1969	497th Tactical Fighter Squadron
	Tet 1969/Counteroffensive	23 February 1969–8 June 1969	497th Tactical Fighter Squadron
	Vietnam Summer-Fall 1969	9 June 1969–31 October 1969	497th Tactical Fighter Squadron
	Vietnam Winter-Spring 1970	3 November 1969–30 April 1970	497th Tactical Fighter Squadron
	Sanctuary Counteroffensive	1 May 1970–30 June 1970	497th Tactical Fighter Squadron
	Southwest Monsoon	1 July 1970–30 November 1970	497th Tactical Fighter Squadron
	Commando Hunt V	1 December 1970–14 May 1971	497th Tactical Fighter Squadron
	Commando Hunt VI	15 May 1971–31 July 1971	497th Tactical Fighter Squadron
	Commando Hunt VII	1 November 1971–29 March 1972	497th Tactical Fighter Squadron
	Vietnam Ceasefire Campaign	29 March 1972–28 January 1973	497th Tactical Fighter Squadron

== See also ==
- Aerospace Defense Command Fighter Squadrons
- List of United States Air Force fighter squadrons
- List of F-86 Sabre units
- F-89 Scorpion units of the United States Air Force
- F-94 Starfire units of the United States Air Force
- List of F-4 Phantom II operators
