= 503rd Air Defense Group =

503d Air Defense Group
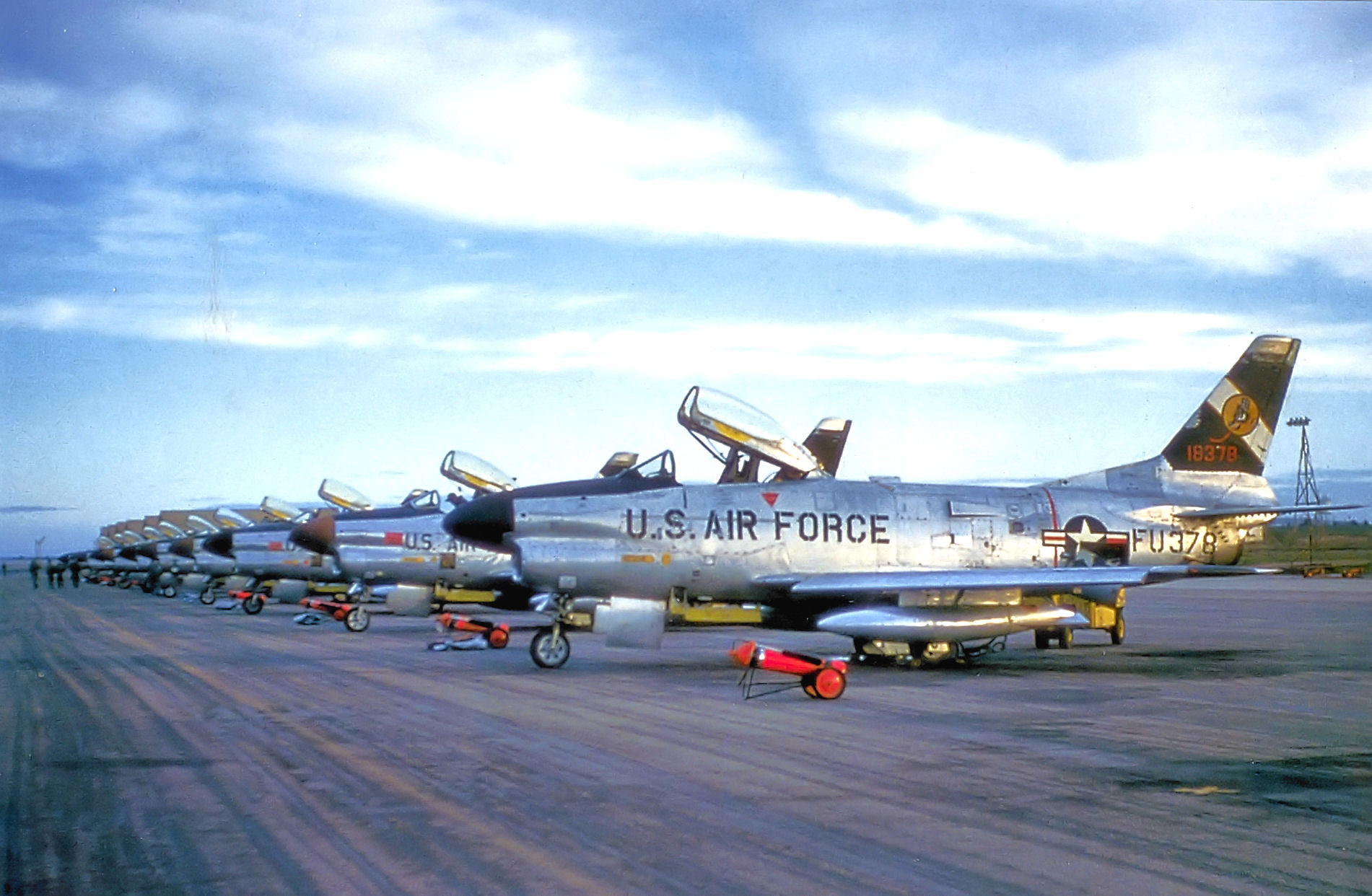
- North American F-86D Sabres of the 357th FIS (Note: In the foreground is North American F-86D-35-NA Sabre, serial 51-8378. This plane was transferred to the Royal Hellenic Air Force in 1958. Baugher, Joe (29 March 2023). "1951 USAF Serial Numbers". Joe Baugher.)
- Active: 1945–1947; 1953–1955
- Country: United States
- Branch: United States Air Force
- Type: Fighter interceptor
- Role: Air defense

The 503d Air Defense Group is an inactive United States Air Force organization. Its last assignment was with the 25th Air Division of Air Defense Command (ADC) at Portland International Airport, Oregon. It was inactivated on 18 August 1955.

The group was originally activated as a support group at the end of World War II and provided logistics and administrative support for the 86th Fighter Group in Germany until 1946, when the group returned to the United States, where it supported the 56th Fighter Group. It was discontinued when the USAF reorganized its combat and support units on its bases into a single wing.

The group was activated once again in 1953, when ADC established it as the headquarters for two dispersed fighter-interceptor squadrons and the medical, aircraft maintenance, and administrative squadrons supporting them. It was replaced in 1955 when ADC transferred its mission, equipment, and personnel to the 337th Fighter Group in a project that replaced air defense groups commanding fighter squadrons with fighter groups with distinguished records during World War II.

== History ==
=== World War II ===
The group was activated as the 503d Air Service Group toward the end of World War II, shortly after V-E Day in a reorganization of Army Air Forces (AAF) support groups in which the AAF replaced service groups that included personnel from other branches of the Army and supported two combat groups with air service groups including only Air Corps units, designed to support a single combat group. Its 921st Air Engineering Squadron provided maintenance that was beyond the capability of the combat group, its 745th Air Materiel Squadron handled all supply matters, and its Headquarters & Base Services Squadron provided other support. it supported the 86th Fighter Group, as part of the occupation forces in Germany until 1946. The group returned to the US and supported the 56th Fighter Group at Selfridge Field, Michigan In October 1946, the group deployed a detachment to Ladd Field, Alaska for arctic training. In 1947 the group and its squadrons were inactivated and replaced by the 56th Airdrome Group, 56th Maintenance & Supply Group, and 56th Station Medical Group as the Air Force began a service test of the Wing/Base organization, which was adopted to unify control at air bases. The 503d Group was disbanded in 1948.

=== Cold War ===
During the Cold War The group was reconstituted, redesignated as the 503d Air Defense Group, and activated at Portland International Airport on 18 February 1953, with the mission to train and maintain interceptor squadrons in state of readiness in order to defend Northwest United States. The 357th Fighter-Interceptor Squadron, which was already stationed at Portland and Flying North American F-86 Sabres was assigned as the operational component of the group. The group replaced the 89th Air Base Squadron as host organization for active duty USAF units at Portland. It was assigned three squadrons to perform its support responsibilities.

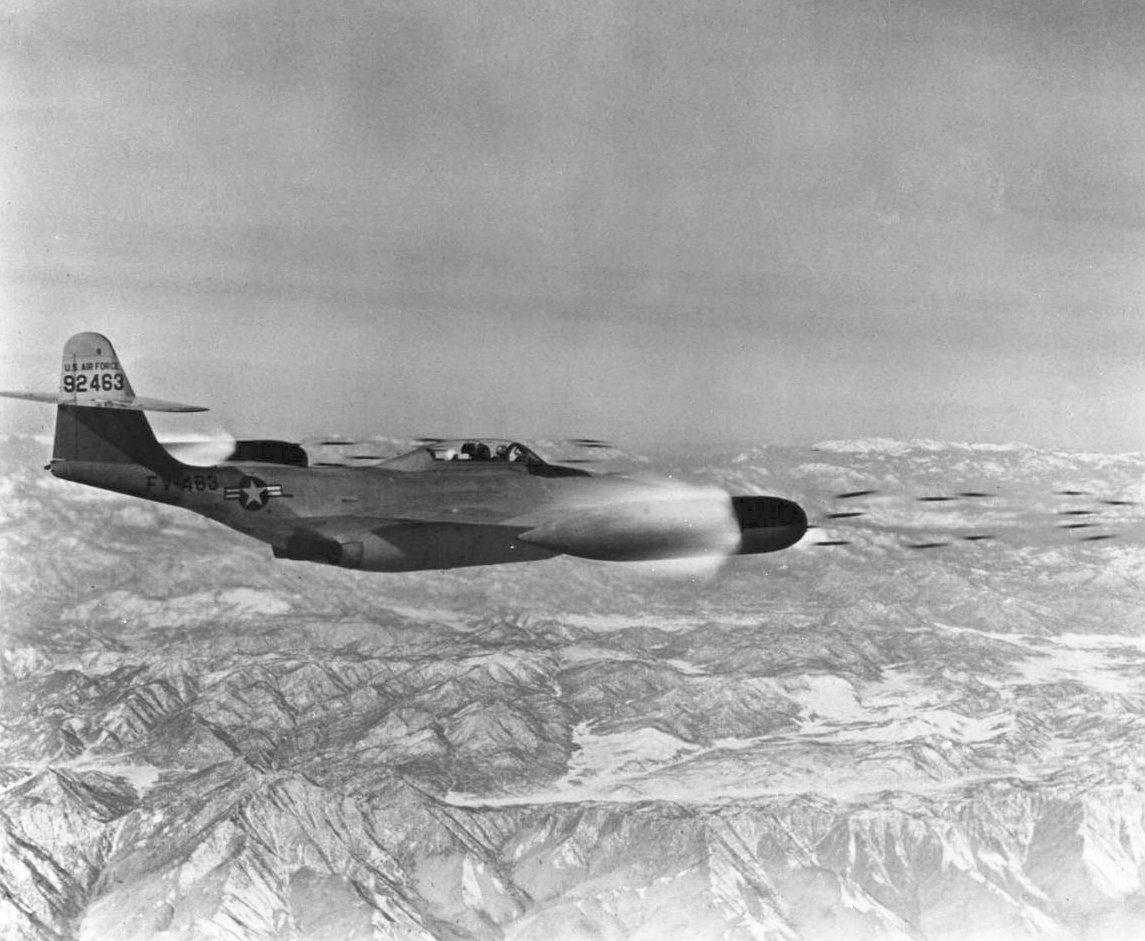
USAF F-89D Scorpion firing missiles (Note: Aircraft is Northrop F-89D Scorpion, serial 49-2463. This aircraft was built as an F-89B, then modified to F-89D standard. It crashed at Edwards AFB, California in October 1953.Baugher, Joe (29 March 2023). "1951 USAF Serial Numbers". Joe Baugher.)

Two days later, the 497th Fighter-Interceptor Squadron, flying Lockheed F-94 Starfire aircraft equipped with airborne intercept radar and armed with 20 mm cannons, was activated as the group's permanent operational squadron. In May 1953, the 357th Squadron was transferred to French Morocco and was reassigned. In 1954, the 497th converted to Northrop F-89 Scorpion aircraft armed with Mighty Mouse rockets. The group was inactivated and replaced by the 337th Fighter Group (Defense) in 1955 as part of ADC's Project Arrow, which was designed to bring back on the active list the fighter units which had compiled memorable records in the two world wars. The group was disbanded once again in 1984, but reconstituted in 1985. as a base support organization. It has not been active since.

== Lineage ==
- Constituted as 503d Air Service Group on 16 December 1944

Activated on 6 June 1945
Inactivated on 15 August 1947
Disbanded on 8 October 1948

- Reconstituted and redesignated 503d Air Defense Group on 21 January 1953

Activated on 16 February 1953
Inactivated on 18 August 1955
Disbanded on 27 September 1984

- Reconstituted on 31 July 1985 and redesignated 503d Combat Support Group

=== Assignments ===
- Ninth Air Force, 6 June 1945
- IX Air Force Service Command, 25 October 1945
- XII Tactical Air Command, 15 December 1945
- 64th Fighter Wing, 15 February 1946 – March 1946
- Strategic Air Command March 1946 – June 1946
- Fifteenth Air Force June 1946 – 15 August 1947
- 4704th Air Defense Wing, 16 February 1953 – 8 October 1954
- 25th Air Division, 8 October 1954 – 18 August 1955

=== Components ===
- 357th Fighter-Interceptor Squadron, 16 February 1953 – 25 May 1953
- 497th Fighter-Interceptor Squadron, 18 February 1953 – 18 August 1955
- 503d Air Base Squadron, 16 February 1953 – 18 August 1955
- 503d Materiel Squadron, 16 February 1953 – 18 August 1955
- 503d Medical Squadron (later 503d USAF Infirmary), 16 February 1953 – 18 August 1955
- 745th Air Materiel Squadron, 6 June 1945 – 15 August 1947 (not manned 15 Feb 1946-unknown)
- 921st Air Engineering Squadron, 6 June 1945 – 15 August 1947 (not manned 14 February 1946 – Apr 1946)

=== Stations ===
- Gross Gerau, Germany, 6 June 1945
- AAF Station Schweinfurt (R-35), Germany, Sep 1945
- Bolling Field, District of Columbia, Feb 1946
- Selfridge Field, Michigan, April 1946 – 15 August 1947
- Portland International Airport, Oregon, 1 February 1952 – 18 August 1955

=== Aircraft ===
- North American F-86F Sabre, 1953
- Northrop F-89D Scorpion, 1954–1955
- Lockheed F-94A Starfire, 1953–1954
- Lockheed F-94B Starfire, 1953

=== Commanders ===
- Unknown, 6 June 1945 – 11 June 1945
- Lt Col. Michael J. King, 11 June 1945 – unknown
- Lt Col. Hugh A. Griffith, ca. 22 May 1946 – 1946
- Lt Col. John A. Carey, 1946 – unknown
- Col. Frank W. Seifert, December 1946 – 14 January 1947
- Lt Col. John W. Gaff, Jr. 14 January 1947 – 1947
- Unknown, 16 February 1953 – 18 August 1955

=== Service streamer ===
Service Streamer	Campaign	Dates	Notes
	World War II Army of Occupation (Germany)	9 May 1945 – February 1946	503d Air Service Group

== See also ==
- Aerospace Defense Command Fighter Squadrons
- List of F-86 Sabre units
- F-89 Scorpion units of the United States Air Force
- F-94 Starfire units of the United States Air Force
