= 337th Aeronautical Systems Group =

United States Air Force unit

337th Aeronautical Systems Group

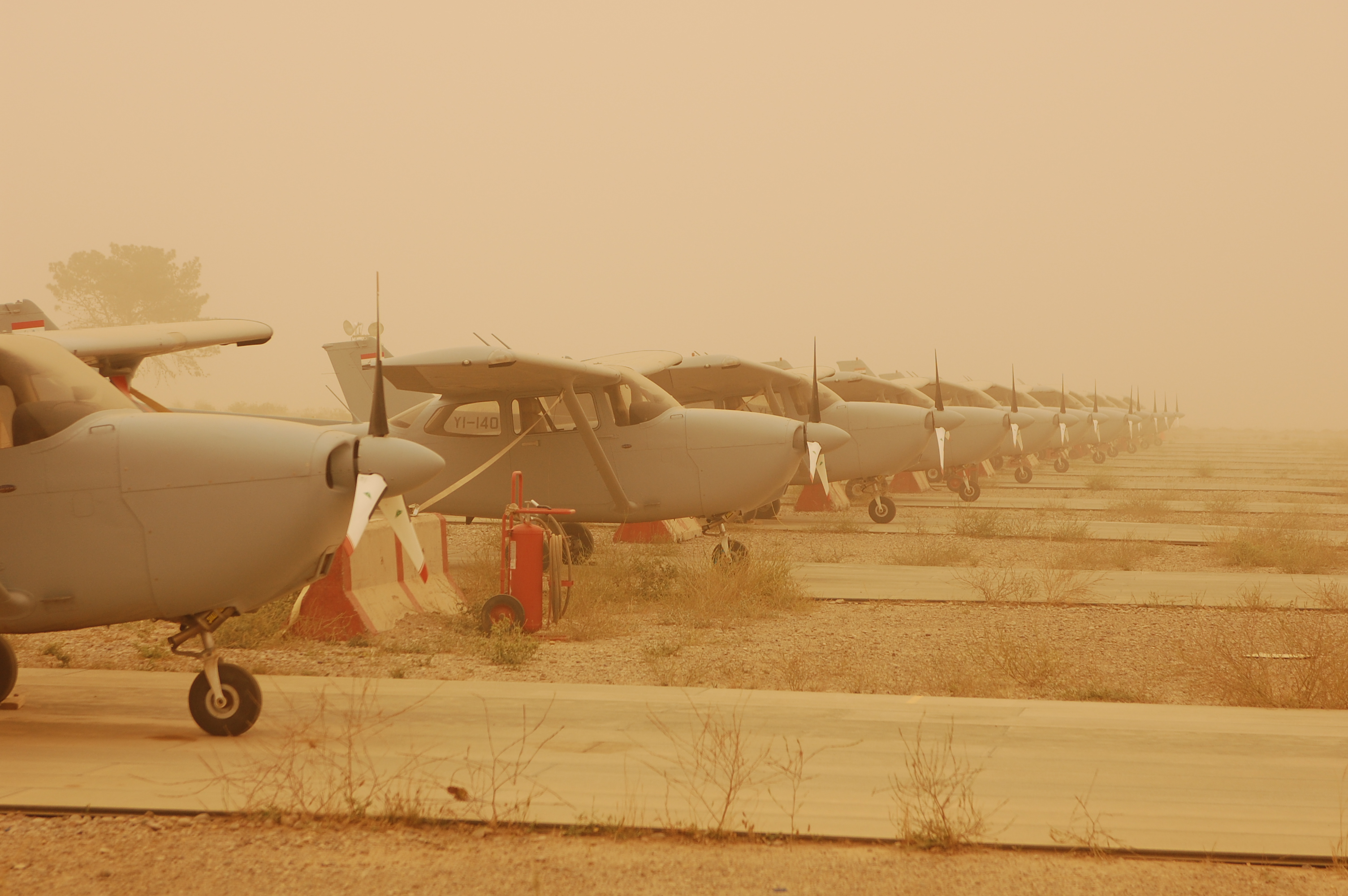
- Iraqi Air Force Cessna 172 Skyhawks at Kirkuk Air Base
- Active: 1942-1944, 1955-1966, 2005-2008
- Country: United States
- Branch: United States Air Force
- Role: Systems Development
- Part of: Air Force Materiel Command
- Decorations: Air Force Outstanding Unit Award

Insignia
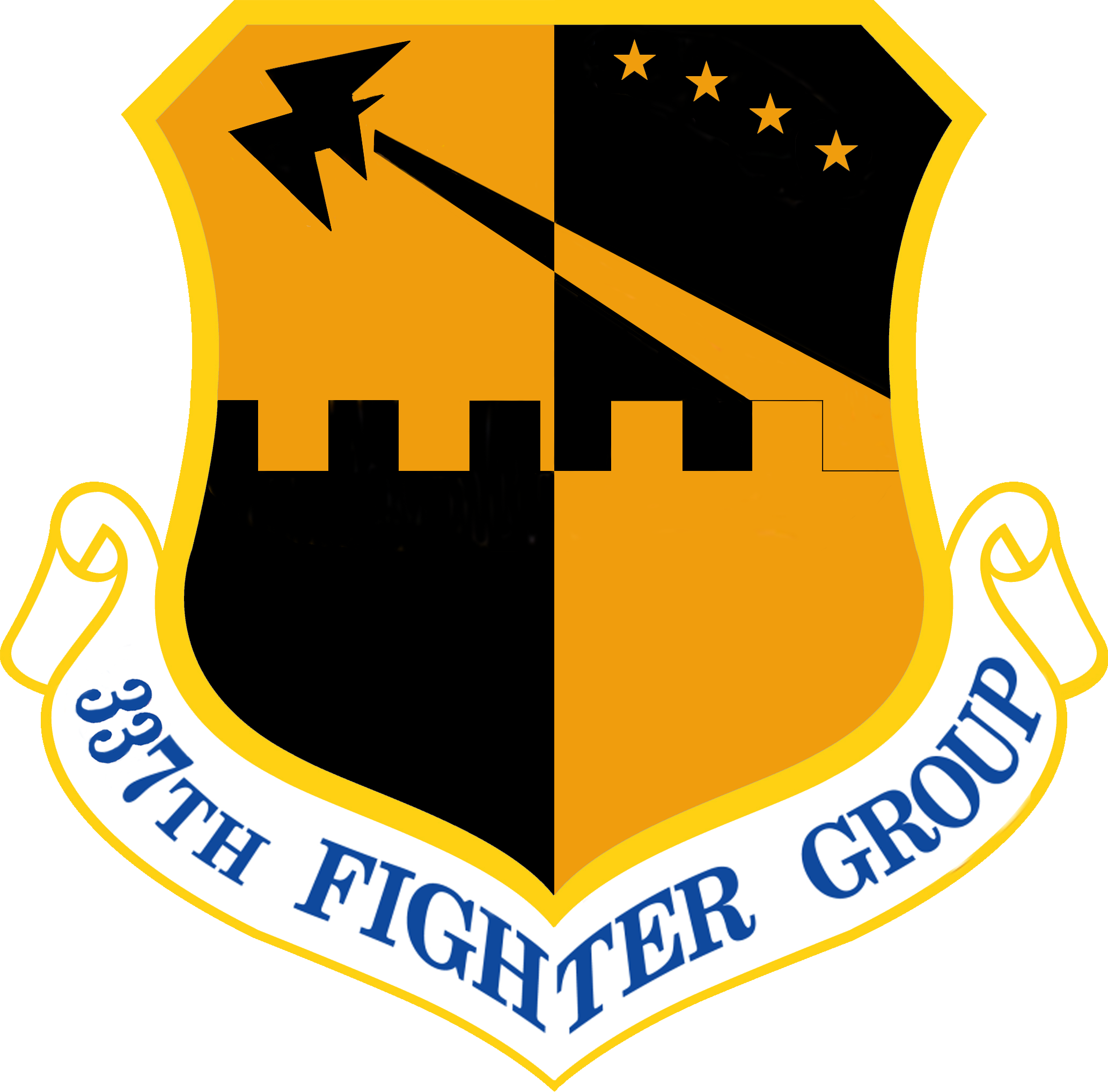
- 337th Fighter Group emblem (Note: Approved 26 June 1957. Description: Per fess abaisse embattled, and per pale, in the first quarter two stylized delta winged aircraft flying in close formation, noses to dexter, a contrail from the two aircraft, bendwise} across the shield to the embattlement; four stars arched over the sinister chief, all colors counterchanged or and sable.)

The 337th Aeronautical Systems Group is an inactive United States Air Force unit. Its last assignment was with the Aeronautical Systems Center of Air Force Materiel Command at Wright Patterson Air Force Base, Ohio, where it was inactivated in 2008.

The group was first activated in 1942 at Morris Field, North Carolina as the 337th Fighter Group. During World War II it acted as a Replacement Training Unit for fighter pilots. The group was disbanded in 1944 in a major reorganization of Army Air Forces training units.

The 337th was activated again in 1955, when it replaced the 503d Air Defense Group at Portland International Airport as part of Air Defense Command (ADC)'s Project Arrow, which was designed to revive fighter units that had served during World War II and replace ADC's post-war units. It provided air defense for the Pacific northwest until it was inactivated in 1966, earning two Air Force Outstanding Unit Awards. The commander at Portland had been Lt. Col. George W. White, who had previously been with the 503d Air Defense Group, and who died during his command at 43 years of age, in August 1957.

In January 2005 the Training Aircraft Systems Group was activated as part of the Air Force Materiel Command Transformation, which replaced traditional procurement offices with wings, groups and squadrons. In May 2006 the two groups were consolidated and the consolidated unit named the 337th Aeronautical Systems Group. In 2008, the unit was inactivated and its squadrons reassigned to the 877th Aeronautical Systems Group.

== History ==
=== World War II ===
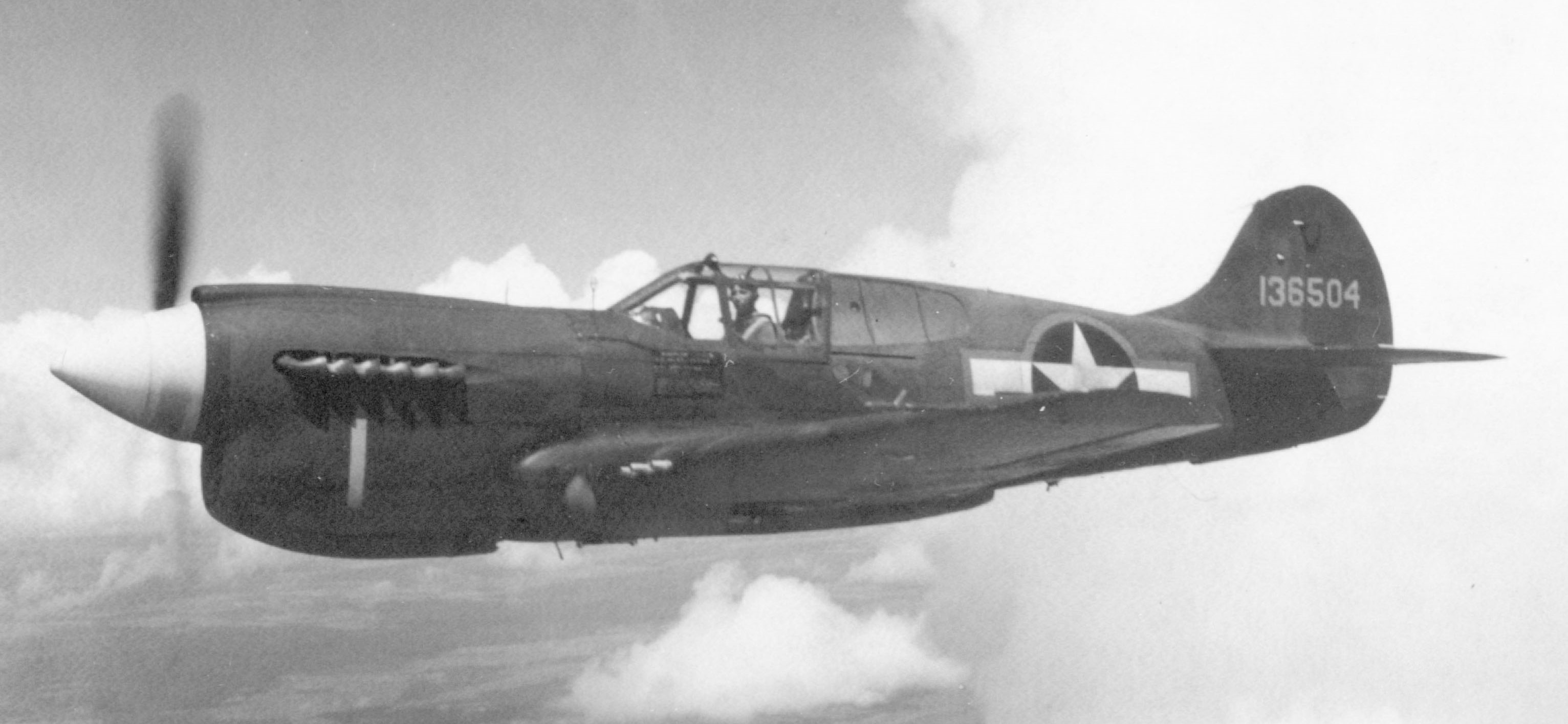
Curtiss P-40 Warhawk

The 337th Fighter Group was activated in July 1942 at Morris Field, North Carolina with the 98th, 303d, (Note: This 303d Fighter Squadron is not related to the current reserve 303d Fighter Squadron, which was a troop carrier unit during World War II.) and 304th Fighter Squadrons assigned. It received its initial cadre from the 20th Fighter Group. However, two of its squadrons departed Morris Field the day they were activated, with the 303d moving to Spartanburg Army Air Field and the 304th to the Myrtle Beach Bombing Range, both in South Carolina, to be organized. The group's initial equipment was a mix of obsolescent fighter aircraft. Although these were mostly Curtiss P-40 Warhawks, the 304th Squadron also flew Bell P-39 Airacobras and Republic P-43 Lancers.

Two weeks later, the group and the 98th Squadron moved to Drew Field, near Tampa, Florida. The 303d Squadron joined them later that month, while the 304th moved to the Tampa Bay Area, but to Pinellas Army Air Field, on the other side of the bay. The group operated as a Replacement Training Unit (RTU), with the Warhawk. RTUs were oversized units which trained individual pilots or aircrews.

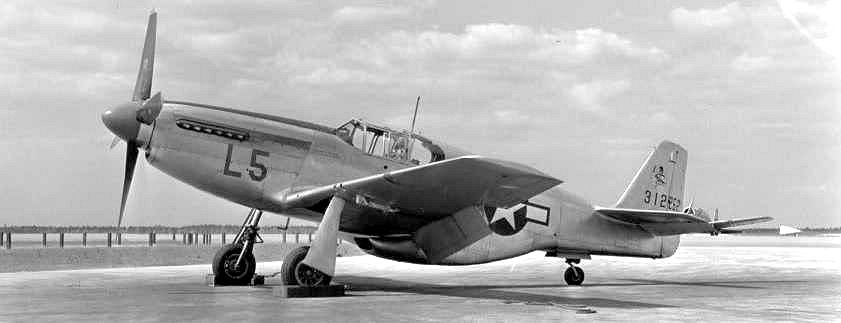
P-51B of a training unit in the Tampa Bay area (Note: Aircraft is North American P-51B-1-NA serial 43-12252 at Hillsborough Army Air Field in 1944.)

In January 1943 the group and the squadrons at Drew Field moved to Sarasota Army Air Field, where the following month the group added a fourth squadron, the 440th Fighter Squadron. In August, the 440th joined the 304th at Pinellas and the group maintained a split operation at Sarasota and Pinellas until it was disbanded. The group transitioned to North American P-51 Mustangs in early 1944.

However, the Army Air Forces (AAF) was finding that standard military units, which were based on relatively inflexible tables of organization were not proving to be well adapted to the training mission. Accordingly, it adopted a more functional system in which each base was organized into a separate numbered unit. The group and its squadrons were disbanded in May 1944. The 336th AAF Base Unit (Replacement Training Unit, Fighter) assumed the mission of the group at Sarasota, while the 341st AAF Base Unit (Replacement Training Unit, Fighter) took over the group's equipment at Pinellas.

=== Cold War ===
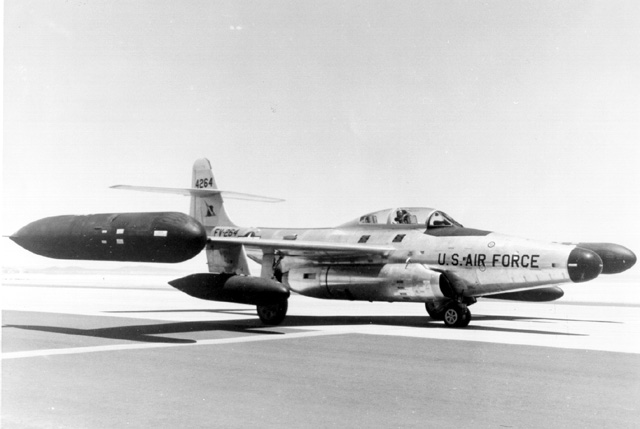
F-89H Scorpion (Note: Aircraft is Northrop F-89H-1-NO Scorpion serial 54-264.)

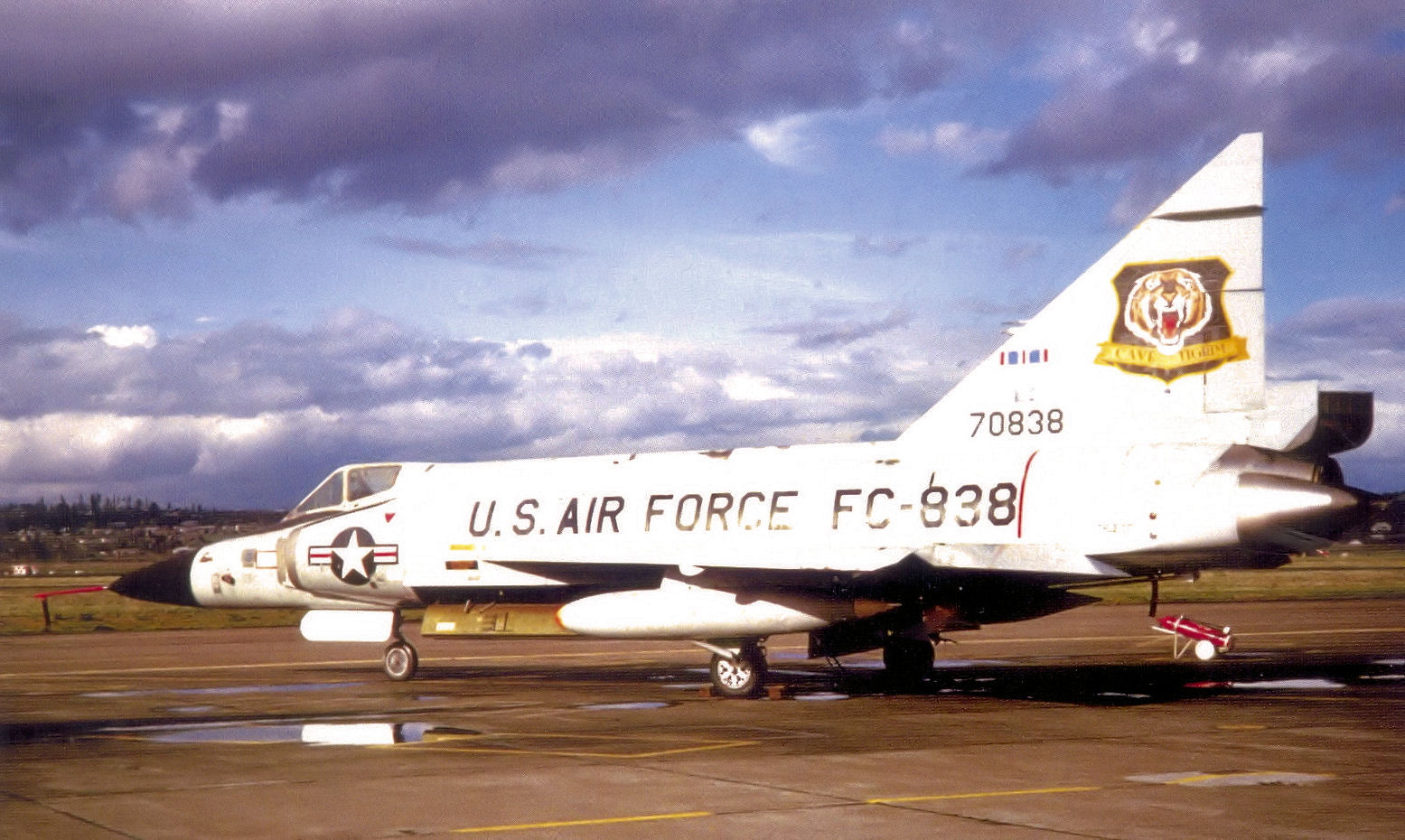
337th Fighter Group F-102 at Portland International Airport (Note: Aircraft is Convair F-102A-90-CO Delta Dagger serial 57-838 of the 460th Fighter-Interceptor Squadron. Photo taken in April 1963.)

The group was reconstituted, redesignated as the 337th Fighter Group (Air Defense) and activated at Portland International Airport in August 1955 as part of Air Defense Command's Project Arrow, which was designed to bring back on the active list the fighter units which had compiled memorable records in the two world wars. At Portland, the group assumed the personnel and equipment of the inactivating 503d Air Defense Group, while its 460th Fighter-Interceptor Squadron, which moved to Portland from McGhee-Tyson Airport, took over the radar equipped and Mighty Mouse rocket armed Northrop F-89D Scorpion aircraft and personnel of the 503d's 497th Fighter-Interceptor Squadron, which moved to Geiger Field, Washington.

The group operated interceptors to provide active air defense in the 25th NORAD Region area of responsibility. It also served as the host organization for regular United States Air Force units at Portland International Airport and was assigned a number of support organizations to perform this mission. In May 1958, the group converted from F-89Ds to supersonic Convair F-102 Delta Dagger aircraft equipped with data link for interception control through the Semi-Automatic Ground Environment system and capable of launching the AIM-4 Falcon.

During the Cuban Missile Crisis, Continental Air Defense Command directed the group to place all its interceptors on five-minute alert. Unlike most ADC groups, however, the group did not disperse part of its strength to other bases. The increased alert posture was maintained through mid-November, when CONAD returned units to their normal alert status, except for those under the control of its 32d Region, which controlled air defense in the Southeastern United States.

Although the number of ADC interceptor squadrons remained almost constant in the early 1960s, attrition (and the fact that production lines closed in 1961) caused a gradual drop in the number of planes assigned to a squadron, from 24 to typically 18 by 1964. The force reduction continued, finally resulting in a reduction in the number of interceptor units, and the group was inactivated in the spring of 1966. In 1985 the group was redesignated the 337th Tactical Fighter Group, although it remained inactive.

=== Systems development ===
In 2005, Air Force Materiel Command AFMC formed the Training Aircraft Systems Group as part of the AFMC Transformation initiative, which replaced traditional project offices with wings, groups, and squadrons. In 2006 this new organization was consolidated with the 327th and became the 337th Aeronautical Systems Group. In 2007, the group's Foreign Military Sales (FMS) team oversaw the effort to provide the Iraqi Air Force with Cessna 172 training aircraft in order to resume flying operations and also sought vendors for Counterinsurgency (COIN) aircraft for Iraq. The group was inactivated in 2008 and its subordinate units were transferred to the 77th Aeronautical Systems Wing's 877th Aeronautical Systems Group.

== Lineage ==
327th Fighter Group

- Constituted as the 337th Fighter Group (Single Engine) on 16 July 1942

Activated on 23 July 1942
Disbanded on 1 May 1944

- Reconstituted and redesignated 337th Fighter Group (Air Defense), on 20 June 1955

Activated on 18 August 1955
Inactivated on 25 March 1966

- Redesignated 337th Tactical Fighter Group on 31 July 1985 (not active)

Consolidated with the Training Aircraft Systems Group on 23 June 2006

Training Aircraft Systems Group

- Constituted as the Training Aircraft Systems Group on 23 November 2004

Activated on 18 January 2005
Consolidated with the 337th Tactical Fighter Group on 23 June 2006

- Redesignated 337th Aeronautical Systems Group on 14 July 2006

Inactivated on 30 June 2008

=== Assignments ===
- III Fighter Command, 23 July 1942 – 1 May 1944
- 25th Air Division, 18 August 1955
- Portland Air Defense Sector, 15 April 1960 - 25 March 1966
- Aeronautical Systems Center, 18 January 2005 - 30 June 2008

=== Components ===
Operational Squadrons

- 98th Fighter Squadron: 21 July 1942 - 1 May 1944
- 303d Fighter Squadron: 21 July 1942 - 1 May 1944
- 304th Fighter Squadron: 21 July 1942 - 1 May 1944
- 440th Fighter Squadron: 24 February 1943 - 1 May 1944
- 460th Fighter-Interceptor Squadron: 18 August 1955 – 25 March 1966
- 502nd Fighter-Bomber Squadron: attached 3 December 1943- 1 May 1944

Support Units

- 337th USAF Infirmary (later 337th USAF Hospital), 18 August 1955 - 25 March 1966
- 337th Air Base Squadron (later 337th Combat Support Squadron), 18 August 1955 - 25 March 66
- 337th Consolidated Aircraft Maintenance Squadron, 1 September 1957 - 25 March 1966
- 337th Materiel Squadron, 18 August 1955 - 1 August 1964
- 337th Supply Squadron, 1 August 1964 – 25 March 1966

Systems Units

- T-1 Systems Squadron (later 662d Aeronautical Systems Squadron), 18 January 2005 - 30 June 2008
- T-38 Systems Squadron (later 663d Aeronautical Systems Squadron), 18 January 2005 - 30 June 2008
- Joint Primary Aircraft Training Systems Squadron (later 664th Aeronautical Systems Squadron), 18 January 2005 - 30 June 2008

=== Stations ===
- Morris Field, North Carolina, 23 July 1942
- Drew Field, Florida, 7 August 1942
- Sarasota Army Air Field, Florida, ca. 3 January 1943 - 1 May 1944
- Portland International Airport, Oregon, 18 August 1955 - 30 March 1966
- Wright-Patterson Air Force Base, Ohio, 18 January 2005 - 30 June 2008

=== Aircraft ===
- Bell P-39 Airacobra, 1942
- Curtiss P-40 Warhawk, 1942–1943
- Republic P-43 Lancer, 1942
- Republic P-47 Thunderbolt, 1943
- North American P-51 Mustang, 1944
- Northrop F-89D Scorpion, 1955–1958
- Convair F-102A Delta Dagger, 1958–1966

=== Awards and campaigns ===
Award streamer	Award	Dates	Notes
	Air Force Outstanding Unit Award	8 June 1960-30 April 1962	337th Fighter Group
	Air Force Outstanding Unit Award	1 May 1962-31 July 1963	337th Fighter Group

Campaign Streamer	Campaign	Dates	Notes
	American Theater without inscription	23 July 1942 – 1 May 1944	337th Fighter Group

== See also ==
- Aerospace Defense Command Fighter Squadrons
- F-89 Scorpion units of the United States Air Force
