= 460th Test and Evaluation Squadron =

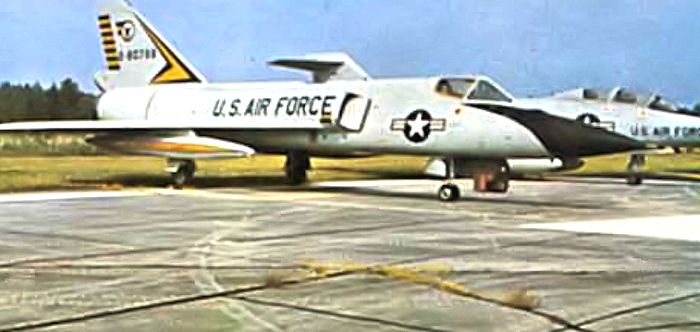
- 460th Fighter-Interceptor Squadron F-106 Delta Darts
- Active: 1942–1982; 2023-present
- Country: United States
- Branch: United States Air Force
- Type: Test
- Nickname: The Black Rams
- Motto: Cave Tigrim Latin Beware of the Tiger
- Decorations: Distinguished Unit Citation; Air Force Outstanding Unit Award; Philippine Presidential Unit Citation

Commanders
- Current commander: Lt Col Derek "Shadow" Anderson

Insignia
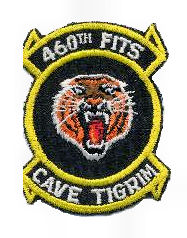
- Patch with 460th Fighter-Interceptor Training Squadron emblem

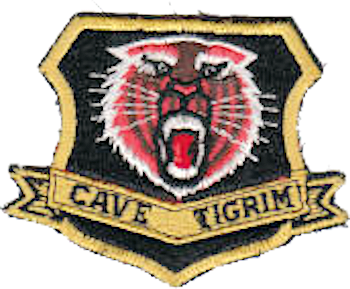
- Patch with 460th Fighter-Interceptor Squadron emblem (approved 17 January 1955)

The 460th Test and Evaluation Squadron is an active United States Air Force unit. It was previously assigned to Tactical Air Command's 325th Fighter Weapons Wing at Tyndall Air Force Base, Florida, where it was inactivated on 15 October 1982. On 11 August 2023, it was reactivated and assigned to the 926th Operations Group, 926th Wing of the Air Force Reserve Command at Nellis Air Force Base, Nevada.

== History ==
=== World War II ===
Established in late 1942 as a ground support squadron. Deployed to the Pacific Theater of Operations in 1943 to Australia where the unit functioned as a ground support unit at Sydney Airport, then at Dobodura in New Guinea. Converted to a P-47 Thunderbolt operational combat unit, engaged in fighter-bomber operations against Japanese positions in New Guinea, Netherlands East Indies and also during the Philippines Campaign (1944–1945). Moved to Okinawa, then Japan after the Japanese Capitulation as part of the Occupation Force, inactivated in 1946.

=== Air defense ===
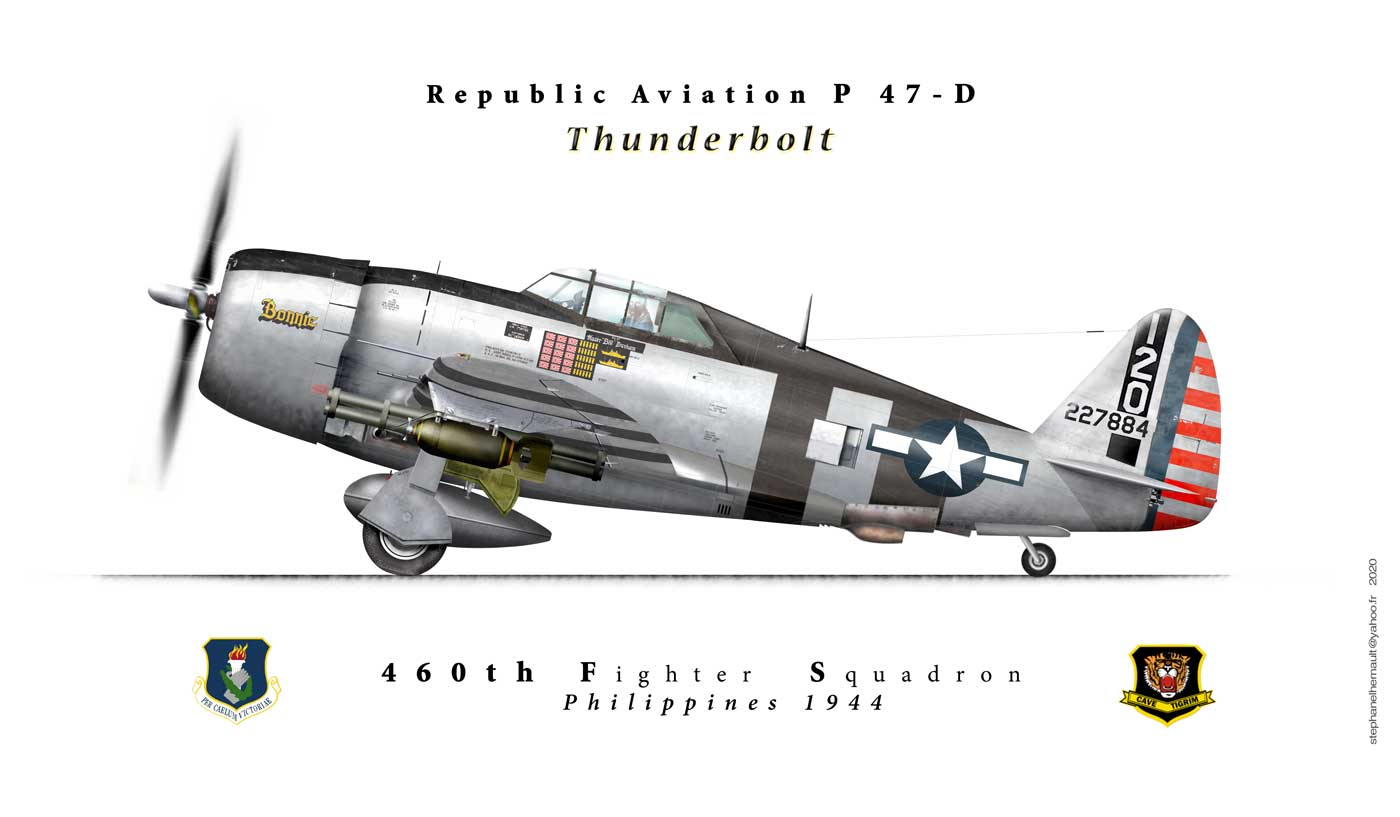
P-47D 460th Fighter Squadron 1944

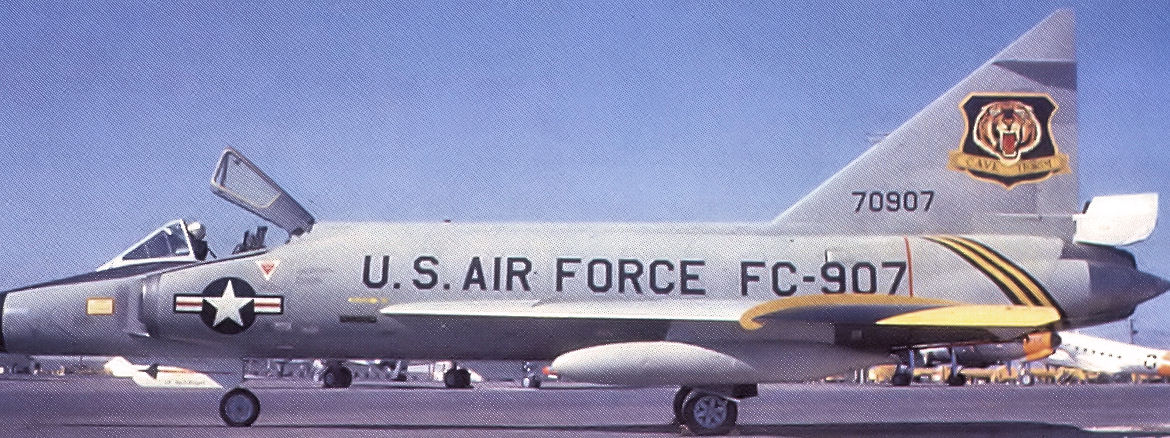
Convair F-102A-95-CO Delta Dagger 57-907, 1960

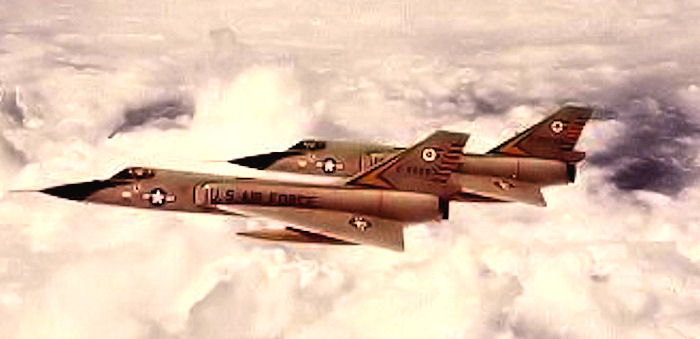
460 FIS F-106 Delta Darts in 1960s grey livery

Reactivated in 1954 as part of the U.S. Air Force Air Defense Command, stationed at Knoxville, for air defense of the Oak Ridge National Laboratory and TVA dams in eastern Tennessee. Moved to Portland AFB, Oregon, and flew air defense missions over the Pacific Northwest, later to southern California in 1968 at Oxnard AFB, which closed a year later; it then moved to Grand Forks AFB, North Dakota, until inactivated as part of the drawdown of ADC in 1974.

=== Fighter training ===
Reactivated briefly in early 1982 as an air defense training squadron at Tyndall AFB, Florida; inactivated late the same year.

=== Test and evaluation ===
The unit was reactivated under the 926th Wing of the Air Force Reserve Command in August 2023. The unit transitioned to performing test and evaluation duties out of Nellis Air Force Base, Nevada.

== Lineage ==
- Constituted as the 1st Airdrome Squadron on 7 November 1942

Activated on 20 November 1942
Redesignated 460th Fighter Squadron, Single Engine on 14 July 1944
Inactivated on 20 February 1946

- Redesignated 460th Fighter-Interceptor Squadron on 23 March 1953

Activated on 18 March 1954
Discontinued on 25 March 1966

- Activated on 1 September 1968 (not organized)

Organized on 30 September 1968
Inactivated on 30 July 1974

- Redesignated 460th Fighter-Interceptor Training Squadron on 1 October 1980

Activated on 15 November 1980
Inactivated on 15 October 1982

- Redesignated 460th Test and Evaluation Squadron on 2023

Activated on 11 August 2023

=== Assignments ===
- Air Service Command, 20 November 1942
- Second Air Force, 28 December 1942
- 16th Bombardment Training Wing, c. 15 February 1943
- Fifth Air Force, c. 1 June 1943 (attached to 310th Bombardment Wing, 1 February 1944; 85th Fighter Wing, c. 16 May–14 July 1944
- V Fighter Command, 14 July 1944
- 348th Fighter Group, 23 September 1944 – 20 February 1946
- 516th Air Defense Group, 18 March 1954
- 337th Fighter Group, 18 August 1955 – 25 March 1966
- 414th Fighter Group, 1 September 1968
- 408th Fighter Group, 1 December 1969
- 25th Air Division, 1 October 1970 – 30 July 1974
- Air Defense, Tactical Air Command, 15 November 1980
- 325th Fighter Weapons Wing, 15 August 1981 – 15 October 1982
- 926th Operations Group, 11 August 2023

=== Stations ===
- Syracuse Army Air Base, New York, 20 November 1942
- Biggs Field, Texas, 2 February – 17 April 1943
- Sydney, New South Wales, Australia, 21 May 1943
- Dobodura Airfield Complex, (Papua) New Guinea, 20 June 1943
- Gusap Airfield, (Papua) New Guinea, 23 October 1943
- Nadzab Airfield Complex, (Papua) New Guinea, 23 July 1944
- Kornasoren Airfield, Noemfoor Island, New Guinea (Irian Jaya), Netherlands East Indies, 23 September 1944
- Tacloban Airfield, Leyte, Philippines, 10 November 1944
- Tanauan Airfield, Leyte, Philippines, 12 December 1944
- San Marcelino Airfield, Luzon, Philippines, 6 February 1945
- Floridablanca Airfield, Luzon, Philippines, 15 May 1945
- Ie Shima Airfield, Okinawa, 12 July 1945
- Itazuke Army Air Base, Japan, 24 November 1945 – 20 February 1946
- McGhee Tyson Airport, Tennessee, 18 March 1954
- Portland International Airport, Oregon, 18 August 1955 – 25 March 1966
- Oxnard Air Force Base, California, 1 September 1968
- Kingsley Field, Oregon, 31 December November 1969 – 1971
- Grand Forks AFB, North Dakota, 1 April 1971 – 15 July 1974
- Peterson Field, Colorado, 15 November 1980
- Tyndall Air Force Base, Florida, 15 August – 15 October 1982
- Nellis Air Force Base, Nevada, 11 August 2023 - present

=== Aircraft ===
- A-20 Havoc, 1944
- P-47 Thunderbolt, 1944–1945
- P-51 Mustang, 1945–1946
- F-86D Sabre Interceptor, 1954–1955
- F-89 Scorpion, 1955–1958
- F-102 Delta Dagger, 1958–1966; TF-102, 1982
- F-106 Delta Dart, 1968–1974
