= 4722d Air Defense Group =

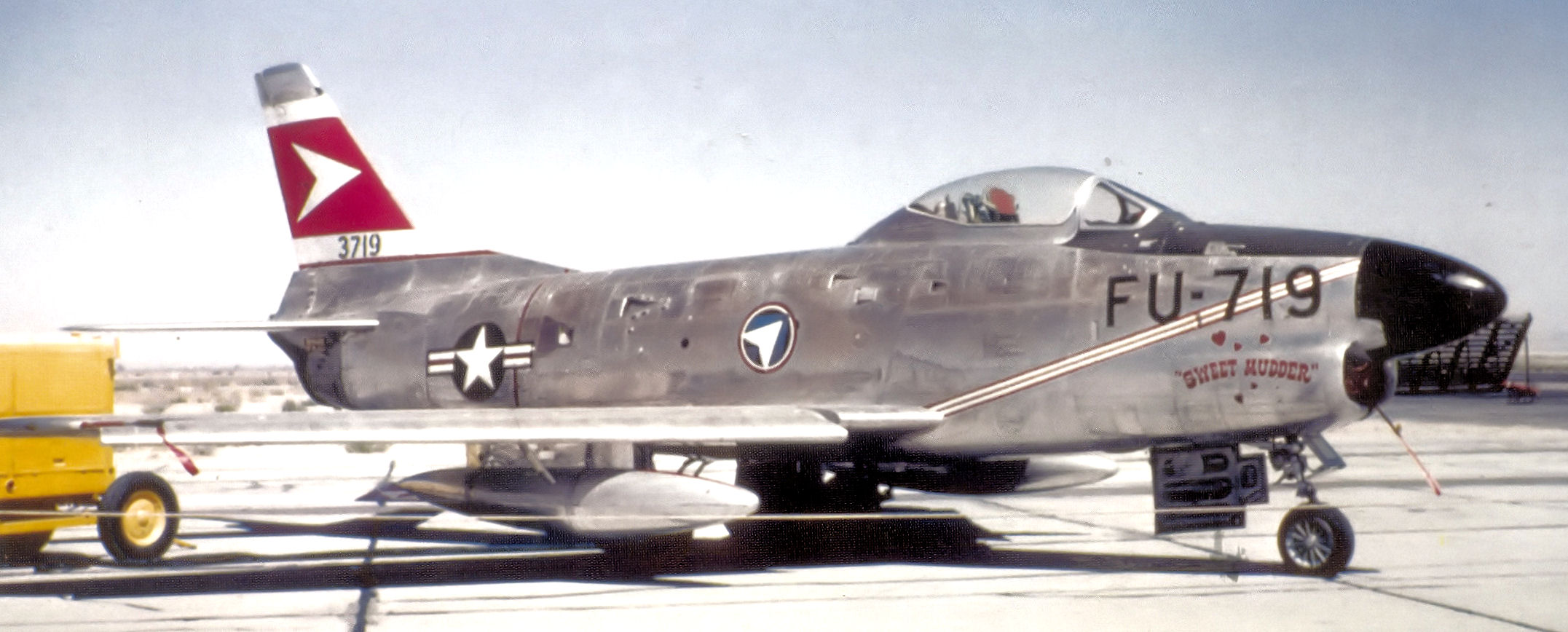
- 329th Fighter-Interceptor Squadron F-86D Sabre at George AFB (Note: Aircraft is North American F-86D-55-NA Sabre 53-0719. Now on display at Wells, Minnesota.Dirkx, Marco (7 June 2025). "1953 USAF Serial Numbers". Joe Baugher’s Serial Number List. The two stripes on its fuselage represent the Operations Officer's aircraft.)
- Active: 1956–1958
- Country: United States
- Branch: United States Air Force
- Type: Fighter interceptor
- Role: Air defense

The 4722d Air Defense Group is a discontinued United States Air Force organization. Its last assignment was with the 27th Air Division at George Air Force Base, California, where it was discontinued in 1958.

The group was formed to provide a single command and support organization for the two fighter interceptor squadrons of Air Defense Command (ADC), that were tenants at George, a Tactical Air Command base. It was discontinued when the 327th Fighter-Interceptor Squadron was scheduled to move in 1958, leaving only a single ADC fighter squadron at George.

== History ==
The group was established as the 4722d Air Defense Group to provide a headquarters for Air Defense Command (ADC) fighter-interceptor squadrons stationed at George Air Force Base, California, a Tactical Air Command (TAC) base. TAC's 479th Air Base Group (until July 1957) and 839th Air Base Group (after July 1957) acted as host base organizations for the group. The 4722d was assigned the 327th Fighter-Interceptor Squadron, flying radar equipped and air-to-air missile–armed Convair F-102 Delta Dagger aircraft, and 329th Fighter-Interceptor Squadron, flying North American F-86 Sabre aircraft which were also radar equipped but armed with Folding-Fin Aerial Rockets, as its operational components. The 329th upgraded to newer model F-86s in the spring of 1957 which, like the 327th's F-102s, were equipped with data link to tie them into the Semi-Automatic Ground Environment command and control system. The group was discontinued when the 327th was scheduled to move to Thule Air Base, Greenland in July 1958, leaving only a single operational ADC squadron at George. Its squadrons were then assigned directly to the 27th Air Division.

== Lineage ==
- Designated as the 4722d Air Defense Group and organized on 1 December 1956

Discontinued on 25 June 1958

=== Assignments ===
- 27th Air Division, 1 December 1956 – 25 June 1958

=== Components ===
- 327th Fighter-Interceptor Squadron, 1 December 1956 – 25 June 1958
- 329th Fighter-Interceptor Squadron, 1 December 1956 – 25 June 1958

=== Stations ===
- George Air Force Base, California, 1 December 1956 – 25 June 1958

=== Aircraft ===
- North American F-86D Sabre: 1956–1957
- North Emerican F-86L Sabre: 1956–1957
- Convair F-102A Delta Dart: 1956–1958

=== Commanders ===
- Lt Col. Harris F. Krause, unknown – 25 June 1958

== See also ==
- List of United States Air Force Aerospace Defense Command Interceptor Squadrons
- List of Sabre and Fury units in the US military
