= 329th Fighter-Interceptor Squadron =

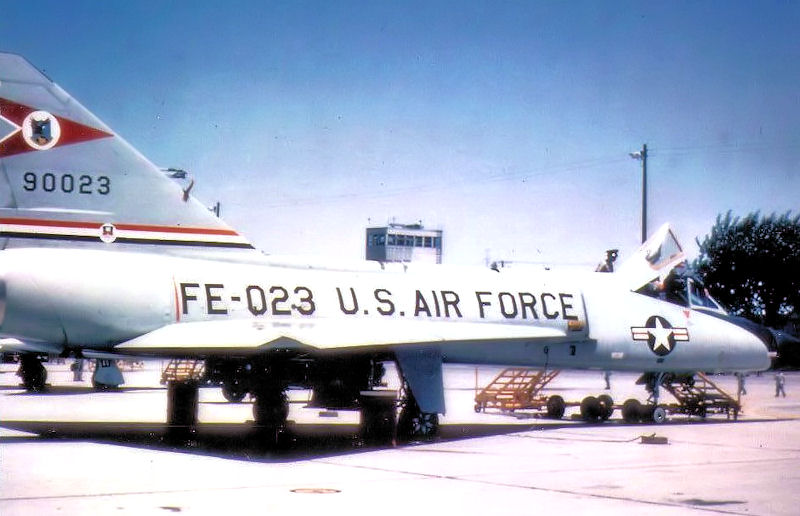
- Squadron F-106 Delta Dart, taken in the mid-1960s. (Note: Aircraft is Convair F-106A-105-CO Delta Dart serial 59-0023. It was assigned to the squadron from December 1964 to May 1967. Later sent to the Military Aircraft Storage and Disposition Center (MASDC) on 11 July 1988. Converted to QF-106 drone. Transferred to the Air Mobility Command Museum at Dover AFB in 1998 for display. Dirkx, Marco (11 June 2023). "1959 USAF Serial Numbers". Joe Baugher’s Serial Number List.)
- Active: 1942–1944; 1955–1967
- Country: United States
- Branch: United States Air Force
- Role: Fighter interceptor

Insignia
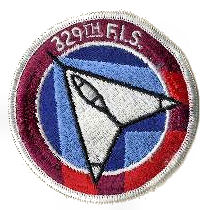
- Patch with 329th Fighter-Interceptor Squadron emblem (Note: Approved 27 October 1955. Description: on a disc, a triangular shaped futuristic weapon white, with wide angular white and deep blue bands surrounding the weapon; encircling the disc an edge white, border light and deep red bands continuing the angular pattern.)

The 329th Fighter-Interceptor Squadron is an inactive United States Air Force unit. Its last assignment was with Los Angeles Air Defense Sector at George Air Force Base, California, where it was inactivated on 1 July 1967.

== History ==
=== World War II ===
Established in mid-1942 as a IV Fighter Command Operational Training Unit (OTU) with a mission to train fighter pilots on single-engine fighter aircraft. Later became a Replacement Training Unit (RTU). Inactivated in early 1944 when the need for fighter pilots was reduced.

=== Air defense ===
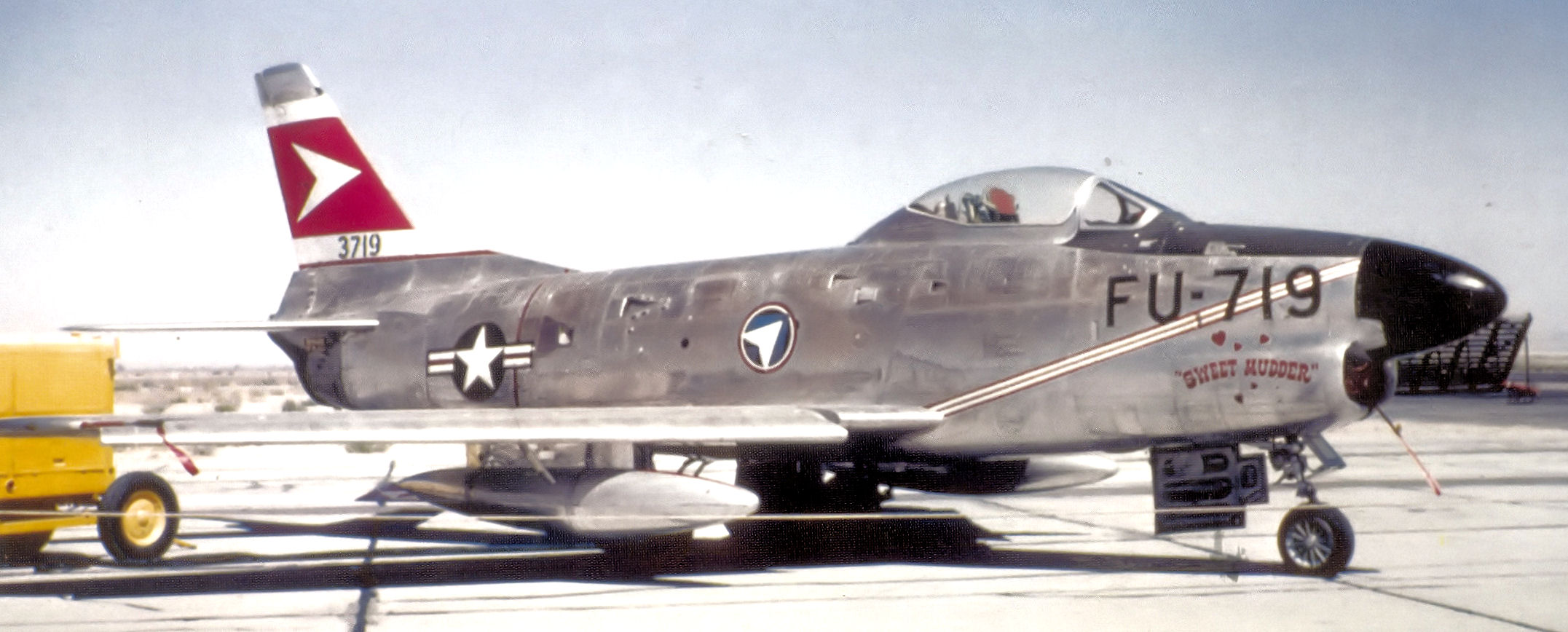
4722d Air Defense Group F-86D (Note: Aircraft is North American F-86D-40-NA Sabre serial 52-3719. Taken at George AFB, California, July 1957. The two stripes on the fuselage represent the Operations Officer's aircraft. Later put on display at Struthers, Ohio. Dirkx, Marco (21 June 2024). "1952 USAF Serial Numbers". Joe Baugher’s Serial Number List.)

The squadron was redesignated the 329th Fighter-Interceptor Squadron and reactivated at George Air Force Base, California in August 1955 as part of Air Defense Command's Project Arrow, which was designed to bring back on the active list the fighter units which had compiled memorable records in the two world wars. At George. the squadron replaced the 456th Fighter-Interceptor Squadron, which had been detached from the 520th Air Defense Group at Truax Field, Wisconsin, assuming its North American F-86D Sabres and its mission to provide air defense over the Southern California region.

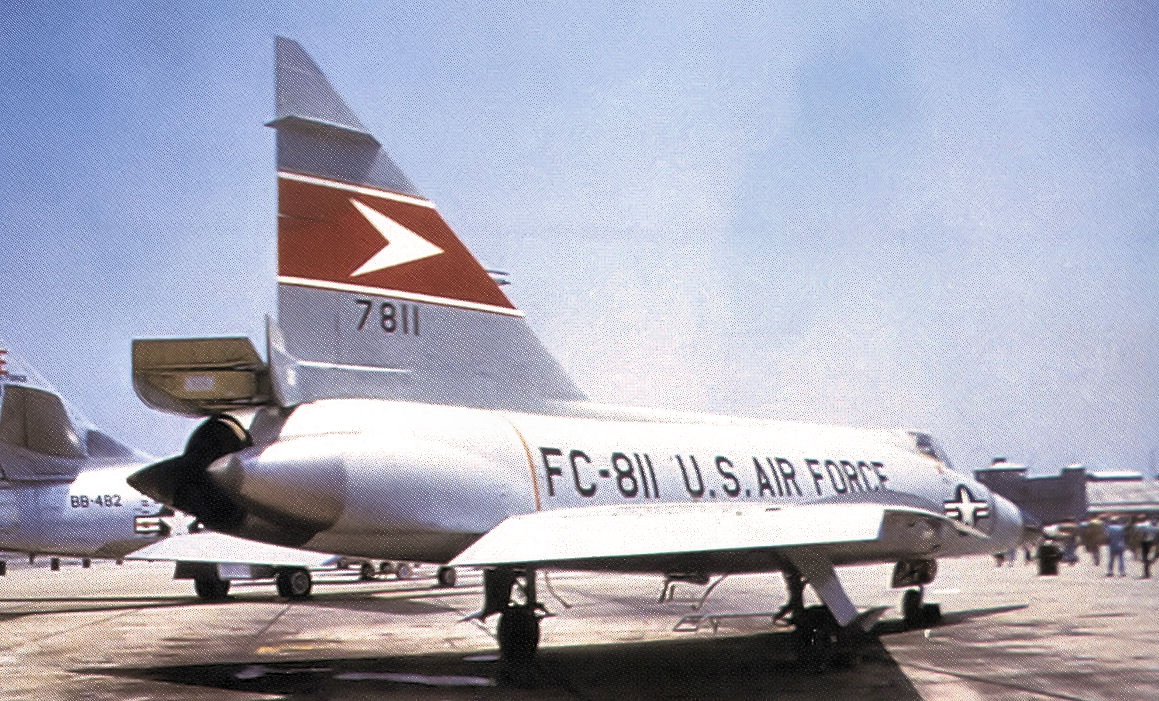
Squadron F-102 Delta Dagger, taken about 1959 (Note: Aircraft is Convair F-102A-90-CO Delta Dagger serial 57-811. Sent to MASDC on 28 April 1970. Sent to Nellis AFB for use as a range target on 15 May 1985. Dirkx, Marco (21 June 2024). "1957 USAF Serial Numbers". Joe Baugher’s Serial Number List.)

In the spring of 1957 it received F-86L Sabres and a year later transitioned into Convair F-102A Delta Dagger aircraft. In July 1960 the unit began flying Convair F-106 Delta Darts. The 329th was inactivated on 31 July 1967 as part of the phasedown of ADC.

== Lineage ==
- Constituted as the 329th Fighter Squadron (Single Engine) on 24 June 1942

Activated on 10 July 1942
Redesignated 329th Fighter Squadron, Single Engine c. 1 August 1943
Disbanded on 31 March 1944

- Reconstituted and redesignated 329th Fighter-Interceptor Squadron on 20 June 1955

Activated on 18 August 1955
Inactivated on 1 July 1967

=== Assignments ===
- 328th Fighter Group, 10 July 1942 – 31 March 1944
- 27th Air Division, 18 August 1955
- 4722d Air Defense Group, 1 December 1956
- 27th Air Division, 25 June 1958
- Los Angeles Air Defense Sector, 1 October 1959
- 27th Air Division, 1 April 1966 – 1 July 1967

=== Stations ===
- Hamilton Field, California, 10 July 1942
- Oakland Municipal Airport California, 2 November 1942
- Portland Army Air Base, Oregon, 7 October 1943
- Concord Army Air Field, California, 18 December 1943 – 31 March 1944.
- George Air Force Base, California, 18 August 1955 – 1 July 1967

=== Aircraft ===
- Bell P-39 Airacobra, 1942–1944
- North American F-86D Sabre, 1955–1958
- Convair F-102 Delta Dagger, 1958–1960
- Convair F-106 Delta Dart, 1960–1967
