= 342nd All-Weather Squadron =

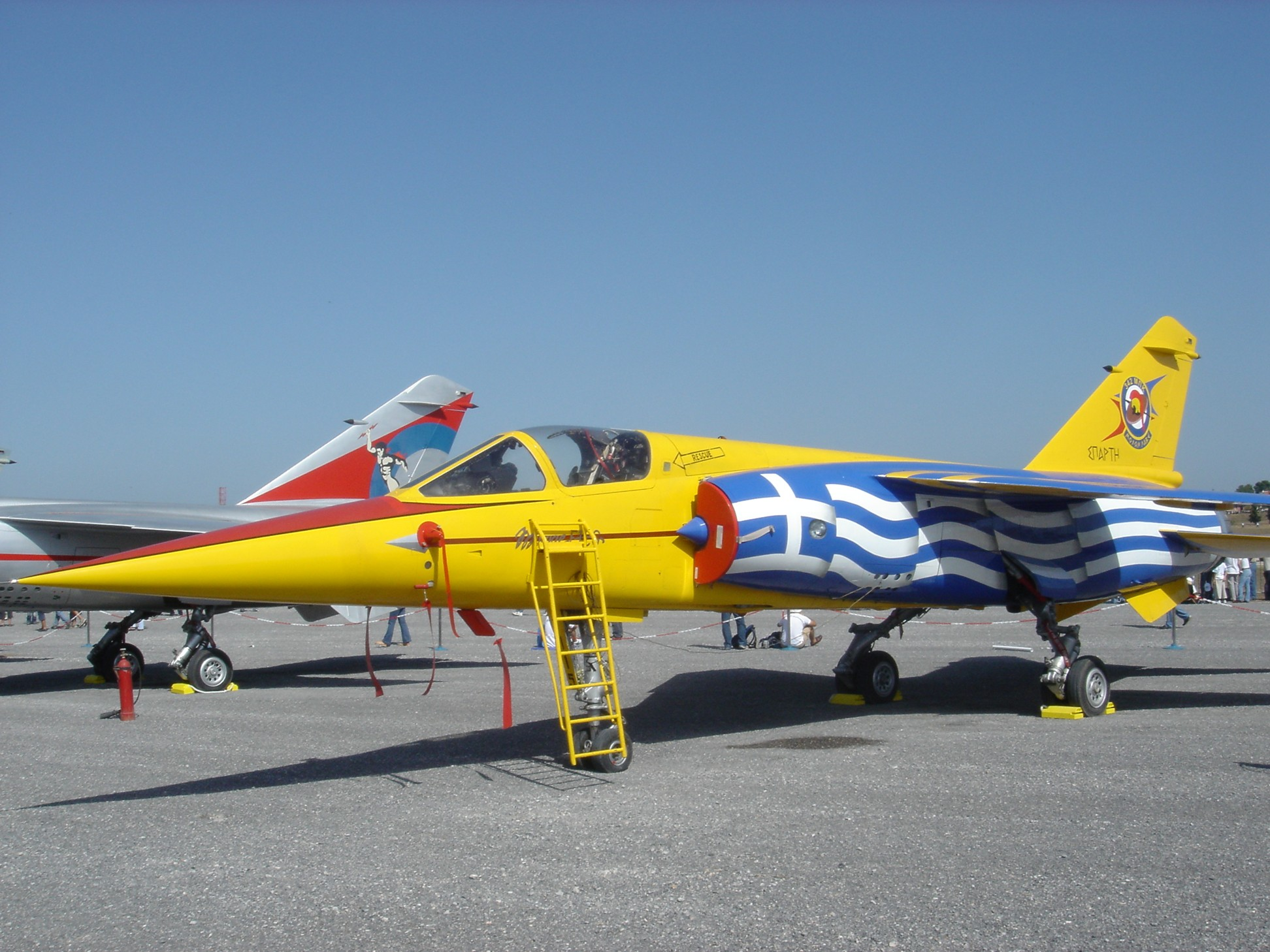
- Mirage F1CG with a special livery for the disbandment of 342nd All-Weather Squadron
- Active: 1955–2003
- Branch: Hellenic Air Force
- Part of: 114th Combat Wing
- Garrison/HQ: Tanagra Air Base

Aircraft flown
- Fighter: F-86E (1955–1964); F-84F (1964–1969); F-102 (1969–1975); Mirage F1CG (1975–2003)

The 342nd All-Weather Squadron (Greek: 342 Μοίρα Παντός Καιρού, 342 MΠΚ), callsign "Sparta" (ΣΠΑΡΤΗ), was a squadron in service with the Hellenic Air Force from 1955 to 2003.

== History ==
The squadron was established in 1955 as the 342nd Day Interceptor Squadron (342 Μοίρα Αναχαίτισης Ημέρας), equipped with F-86E Sabres.

The F-86Es were replaced with F-84Fs in 1964, and the squadron was re-designated 342nd Fighter-Bomber Squadron (343 Μοίρα Διώξεως/Βομβαρδισμού). In 1969, the squadron was re-equipped with F-102s, and received the designation of 342nd All-Weather Squadron (342 Μοίρα Παντός Καιρού).

In 1975 the squadron was re-equipped with Mirage F1CG. With the withdrawal of the F1CG from service, the squadron was disbanded in June 2003.
