= 327th Fighter-Interceptor Squadron =

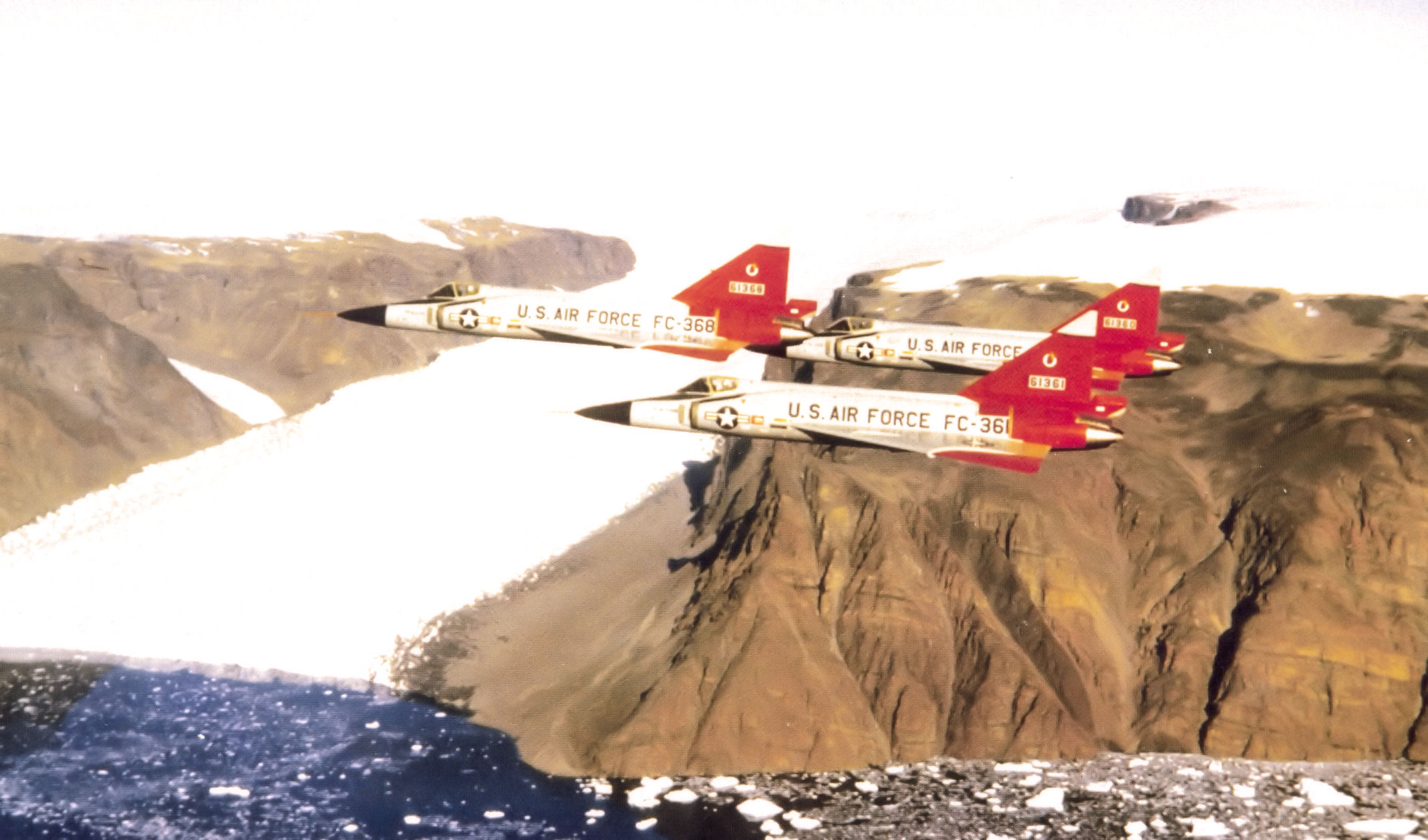
- Squadron F-102A Delta Daggers at Thule AB in 1958 (Note: Aircraft are Convair F-102A-75-CO models: serial 56-1429 (retired to Military Aircraft Storage and Disposition Center (MASDC) on 2 April 1970), 56-1361 (retired to MASDC on 2 June 1971 then to Nellis AFB on 21 May 1985 as a range target), 56-1368 (put on static display at Evergreen Aviation and Space Museum in McMinnville, Oregon). Dirkx, Marco (8 July 2024). "1956 USAF Serial Numbers". Joe Baugher’s Serial Number List.)
- Active: 1942–1944; 1955–1960
- Country: United States
- Branch: United States Air Force
- Role: air defense

Insignia
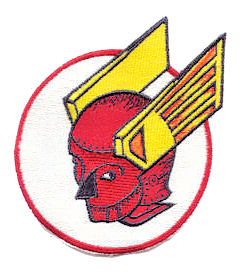
- 327th Fighter-Interceptor Squadron emblem (Note: The squadron apparently never received approval for this variation of its World War II emblem. See Maurer, Combat Squadrons, pp. 403–404 (1942 emblem is approved emblem))

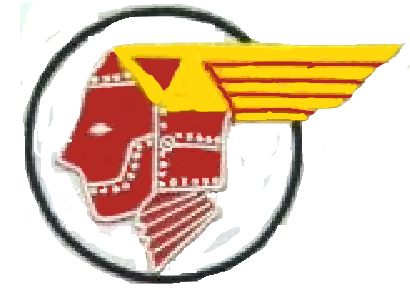
- 327th Fighter Squadron emblem (Note: Approved 14 October 1942. Description: Over and through a white disc, a medieval iron mask red, riveted white, with stylized wings yellow, shaded orange.)

The 327th Fighter-Interceptor Squadron is an inactive United States Air Force unit. Its last assignment was with the 64th Air Division at Thule Air Base, Greenland, where it was inactivated on 25 March 1960.

The squadron was first active during World War II as a training unit. It was disbanded in 1944 when the Army Air Forces reorganized its training and support units in the United States.

The squadron was again activated in August 1955 at George Air Force Base, California. There, it became the first operational squadron to fly the Convair F-102 Delta Dagger. In 1958 it moved to Thule, where it replaced a unit flying older Northrop F-89 Scorpions.

== History ==
=== World War II ===
The squadron was first activated at Hamilton Field, California in July 1942 as the 327th Fighter Squadron, one of the original squadrons of the 328th Fighter Group. The squadron initially participated in air defense of the Pacific coast from Hamilton and later from Mills Field. It also served as an Operational Training Unit (OTU). The OTU program involved the use of an oversized parent unit to provide cadres to "satellite groups". On 1 March 1943, the squadron mission changed to operating a Bell P-39 Airacobra Replacement Training Unit (RTU). Replacement Training Units were also oversized units, but they trained aircrews prior to their deployment to combat theaters.

In February 1944, the 327th moved to Marysville Army Air Field, where it continued as a P-39 RTU. However, the Army Air Forces found that standard military units, based on relatively inflexible tables of organization, were proving less well adapted to the training mission. Accordingly, it adopted a more functional system in which each base was organized into a separate numbered unit, while the groups and squadrons acting as RTUs were disbanded or inactivated. This resulted in the 327th, along with other units at Marysville, being disbanded in the spring of 1944 and being replaced by the 433d AAF Base Unit (Fighter Replacement Training Unit, Single Engine), which assumed the squadron's mission, personnel, and equipment.

=== Cold War air defense ===
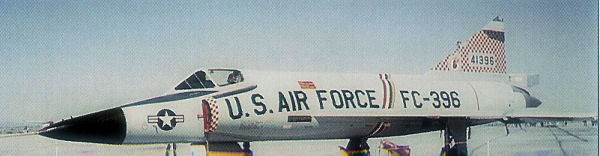
F-102A of the 327 FIS at George AFB (Note: Aircraft is Convair F-102A-30-CO Delta Dagger, serial 54-1396. Note the short vertical stabilizer of early model F-102s. This aircraft crashed on 14 March 1960 near Itazuke AB, Japan. Dirkx, Marco (6 May 2024). "1954 USAF Serial Numbers". Joe Baugher’s Serial Number List.)

The squadron was again activated as the 327th Fighter-Interceptor Squadron at George Air Force Base, California in August 1955. At George, the squadron was initially equipped with radar equipped and Mighty Mouse rocket armed North American F-86D Sabres. These aircraft had been used at George by the 94th Fighter-Interceptor Squadron, which moved from George to Selfridge Air Force Base as part of Air Defense Command (ADC)'s Project Arrow, which was designed to bring back on the active list the fighter units which had compiled memorable records in the two world wars and unite them with their traditional groups.

In April 1956, the 327th was the first ADC squadron to fly the Convair F-102A Delta Dagger in operational service, and became the first supersonic unit in Air Defense Command. These aircraft were also equipped with data link, which enabled them to interface directly with the Semi Automatic Ground Environment computers in ground direction centers, removing the need for voice communications by air to ground radios.

The squadron moved to Thule Air Base, Greenland in July 1958, assuming the air defense role there from the Northrop F-89 Scorpions of the 74th Fighter-Interceptor Squadron. The squadron was inactivated there on 25 March 1960, but the Thule air defense mission was resumed within six weeks by the 332d Fighter-Interceptor Squadron.

== Lineage ==
- Constituted as the 327th Fighter Squadron on 24 June 1942

Activated on 10 July 1942
Disbanded on 31 March 1944

- Reconstituted and redesignated 327th Fighter-Interceptor Squadron on 20 June 1955

Activated on 18 August 1955
Discontinued on 25 March 1960

=== Assignments ===
- 328th Fighter Group, 10 July 1942 – 31 March 1944
- 27th Air Division, 18 August 1955
- 4722d Air Defense Group, 1 December 1956
- 27th Air Division, 25 June 1958
- 64th Air Division, 3 July 1958 – 25 March 1960

=== Stations ===
- Hamilton Field, California, 10 July 1942
- Mills Field, California, 5 October 1942
- Marysville Army Air Field, California, 1 February – 31 March 1944
- George Air Force Base, California, 18 August 1955
- Thule Air Base, Greenland, 3 July 1958 – 25 March 1960

=== Aircraft ===
- Bell P-39 Airacobra, 1942–1944
- North American F-86D Sabre, 1955–1956
- Convair F-102 Delta Dagger, 1956–1960

=== Service streamers ===
Service Streamer	Campaign	Dates	Notes
	American Theater without inscription	10 July 1942 – 31 March 1944	327th Fighter Squadron

== See also ==
- List of United States Air Force Aerospace Defense Command Interceptor Squadrons
- List of Sabre and Fury units in the US military
