= Convair F-102 Delta Dagger =

Cold War interceptor of the US Air Force

F-102 Delta Dagger
- An F-102A in flight

General information
- Type: Interceptor aircraft
- Manufacturer: Convair
- Primary users: United States Air Force Hellenic Air Force; Turkish Air Force
- Number built: 1,000

History
- Introduction date: April 1956
- First flight: 24 October 1953
- Retired: 1979 (Note: The USAF retired its F-102s from service in 1976, followed by both Greece and Turkey in 1979. The USAF F-102s remained as target drones until 1986.)
- Developed from: Convair XF-92
- Developed into: Convair F-106 Delta Dart

The Convair F-102 Delta Dagger (Note: It appears that the aircraft was originally intended to be named Machete; when the Delta Dagger name was adopted is unclear.) is an interceptor aircraft designed and produced by American aircraft manufacturer Convair. A member of the Century Series, the F-102 was the first operational supersonic interceptor and delta-wing fighter operated by the United States Air Force (USAF).

The F-102 was designed in response to a requirement, known as the 1954 Ultimate Interceptor, produced by USAF officials during the late 1940s. Its main purpose was to be the backbone of American air defenses and to intercept approaching Soviet strategic bomber fleets (primarily the Tupolev Tu-95) during the Cold War. The aircraft was designed alongside a sophisticated fire-control system, but a simplified unit had to be adopted due to development difficulties. It used an internal weapons bay to carry both guided missiles and rockets. On 23 October 1953, the prototype YF-102 performed its maiden flight; it was destroyed in an accident, though, only nine days later. The second prototype allowed flight testing to resume three months later, but results were disappointing; as originally designed, the aircraft could not achieve Mach 1 supersonic flight.

To improve its performance prior to quantity production commencing, the F-102 was redesigned, its fuselage was reshaped in accordance with the area rule, and a thinner and wider wing was adopted. Flight testing demonstrated sufficient performance improvements for the USAF to be persuaded to permit its production; a new production contract was signed during March 1954. Following its entry to USAF service in 1956, the F-102 promptly replaced various subsonic fighter types, such as the Northrop F-89 Scorpion, in the interceptor role. The F-102C tactical attack model, equipped with several improvements, including a more powerful engine and Gatling gun, was proposed, but ultimately was not pursued. In total, 1,000 F-102s were built, both for the USAF and a handful of export customers, including the Hellenic Air Force and the Turkish Air Force.

By the 1960s, USAF F-102s had participated in a limited capacity in the Vietnam War as bomber escorts and even in the ground-attack role. The aircraft was supplemented by McDonnell F-101 Voodoos and later on by McDonnell Douglas F-4 Phantom IIs. Over time, many F-102s were retrofitted with infrared search/tracking systems, radar warning receivers, transponders, backup artificial horizons, and modified fire-control systems. Throughout the mid- to late 1960s, many USAF F-102s were transferred from the active-duty Air Force to the Air National Guard, and with the exception of those examples converted to unmanned QF-102 full-scale aerial target drones, the type was totally retired from operational service in 1976. Its principal successor in the interceptor role was the Mach 2-capable Convair F-106 Delta Dart, which was an extensive redesign of the F-102.

== Design and development ==
=== Background ===
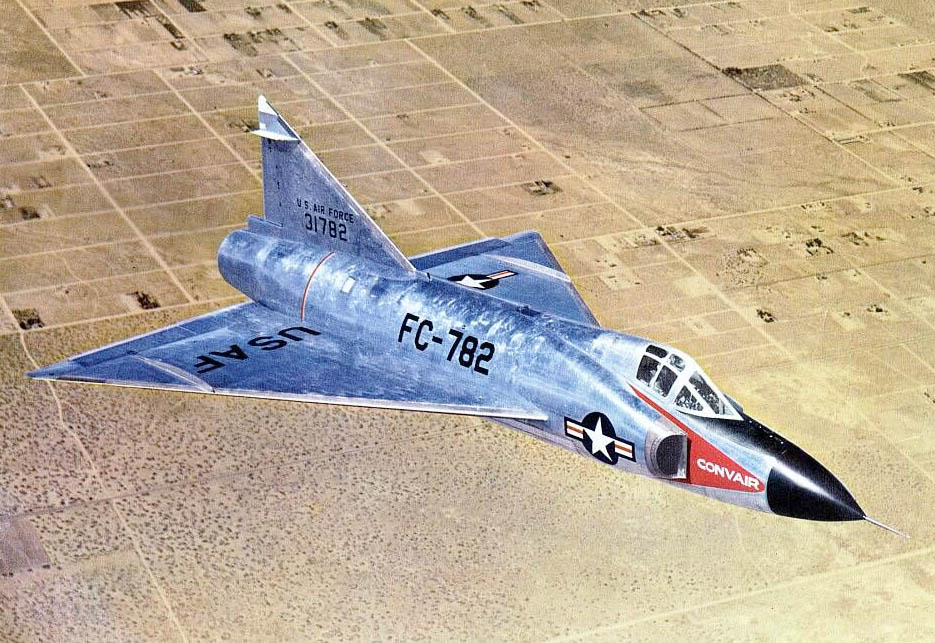
YF-102 prototype

On 8 October 1948, the board of senior officers of the USAF issued recommendations that the service organize a competition for a new interceptor scheduled to enter service in 1954; as such, the all-new design would initially be dubbed the 1954 Ultimate Interceptor. Four months later, on 4 February 1949, the USAF approved the recommendation and prepared to hold a corresponding competition during the following year. In November 1949, the USAF decided that the new aircraft would be built around a fire-control system (FCS), which was to be designed before the airframe to ensure compatibility. The airframe and FCS together were called the weapon system.

In January 1950, the USAF's Air Materiel Command issued requests for proposals to 50 companies for the FCS, of which 18 responded. By May, the list was revised downward to 10. Meanwhile, a board at the U.S. Department of Defense headed by Major General Gordon P. Saville reviewed the proposals and distributed some to the George E. Valley-led Air Defense Engineering Committee. Following recommendations by the committee to the Saville Board, the proposals were further reduced to two competitors, Hughes Aircraft and North American Aviation. Although the Valley Committee thought awarding the contract to both companies would be best, Hughes was chosen by Saville and his team on 2 October 1950.

In June 1950, the requirement for the airframe was formally issued; during January 1951, six aircraft manufacturers submitted nine responses. On 2 July 1954, three of the responding companies, Convair, Republic, and Lockheed, were authorized to proceed with the building of a mockup. Upon completion, the three designs would be competitively reviewed, the best of which would lead to the awarding of a single production contract under the name Project MX-1554. Prior to this requirement, Convair had performed considerable early research into delta-winged aircraft and had experimented with various different designs, two of which fell under the name P-92. For the era, Convair's submitted design was relatively unorthodox, not only in terms of the delta wing configuration, but also in the decision to carry all munitions within an internal weapons bay to reduce drag; despite this, Republic's design was even more radical, proposing to use ramjet propulsion to attain speeds in excess of Mach 3.

=== Selection ===
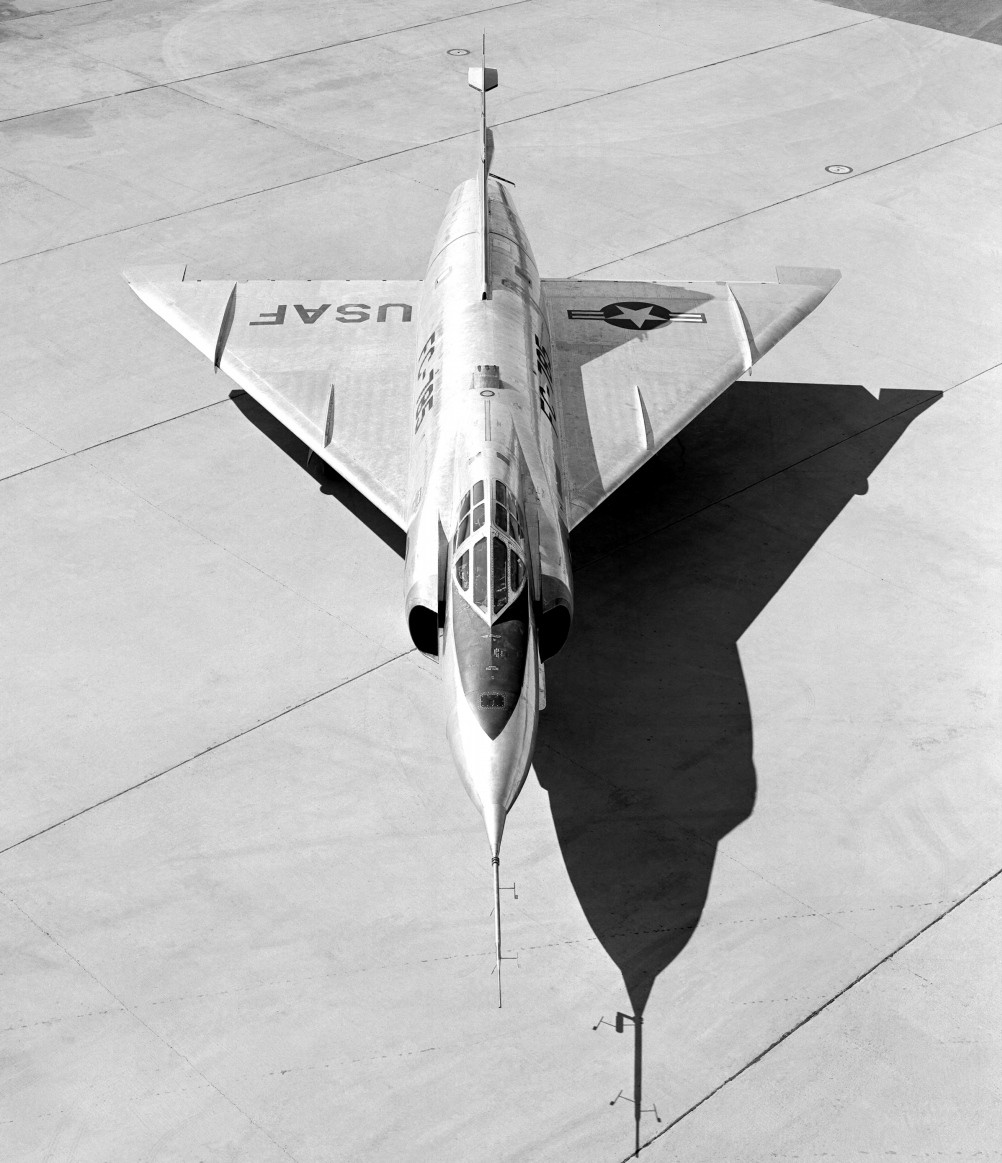
The YF-102 with its original fuselage

Ultimately, Convair's design emerged as the frontrunner for the requirement, which was officially designated XF-102. Lockheed had chosen to drop out to concentrate on other opportunities, while Republic's design had been judged to involve too much technical risk to meet the 1954 deadline for service entry, thus was disqualified, making Convair the de facto winner. The development of three different designs has been considered to be too expensive to proceed with, thus only Convair was permitted to do so in November 1951. From an early stage, USAF officials had decided to use the Cook-Craigie Plan for the aircraft's manufacturing; under this concept, production tooling and facilities were to be created, while a small preproduction batch of aircraft were completed, the aim being to eliminate the need for a lengthy prototype program, instead incorporating any changes required into the production line. However, if substantial modifications were necessary, retooling would then become necessary, as well. In December 1951, to accelerate the aircraft's development, equipping the prototypes and preproduction aircraft with the less-powerful Westinghouse J40 turbojet was proposed.

During early 1953, when construction of the first aircraft had reached an advanced stage, serious design challenges present had become clear, including wind-tunnel testing that revealed early performance projections to have been overly optimistic. Furthermore, sustained delays had occurred to both the Curtiss-Wright J67 engine, a licensed derivative of the Bristol-Siddeley Olympus then still in development, and to the MA-1 (formerly MX-1179) FCS; to address the latter, decisionmakers opted to order an interim aircraft with the J40 and a simpler FCS (initially referred to as E-9) into production as the F-102A. The failure of the J40 led to the Pratt & Whitney J57 turbojet with afterburner, rated with 10,000 pounds-force (44 kN) of thrust, being substituted for the prototypes and F-102As. This aircraft was intended to be temporary, pending the development of the more advanced F-102B, which would employ the more advanced J67. The F-102B later evolved to become the F-106A, dubbed the Ultimate Interceptor.

On 23 October 1953, the YF-102 prototype conducted its first flight from Edwards Air Force Base, piloted by Convair's chief test pilot, Richard L. Johnson. Its flying career was very brief, as it was lost in an accident only nine days later during a failed attempt to reach Mach 1. The accident, which was caused by severe buffeting, seriously injured Johnson. The second aircraft flew on 11 January 1954, confirming a dismal performance. Transonic drag was much higher than expected, and the aircraft was limited to Mach 0.98 (i.e. subsonic), with a ceiling of 48,000 ft (15,000 m), far below the requirements.

=== Major redesign ===
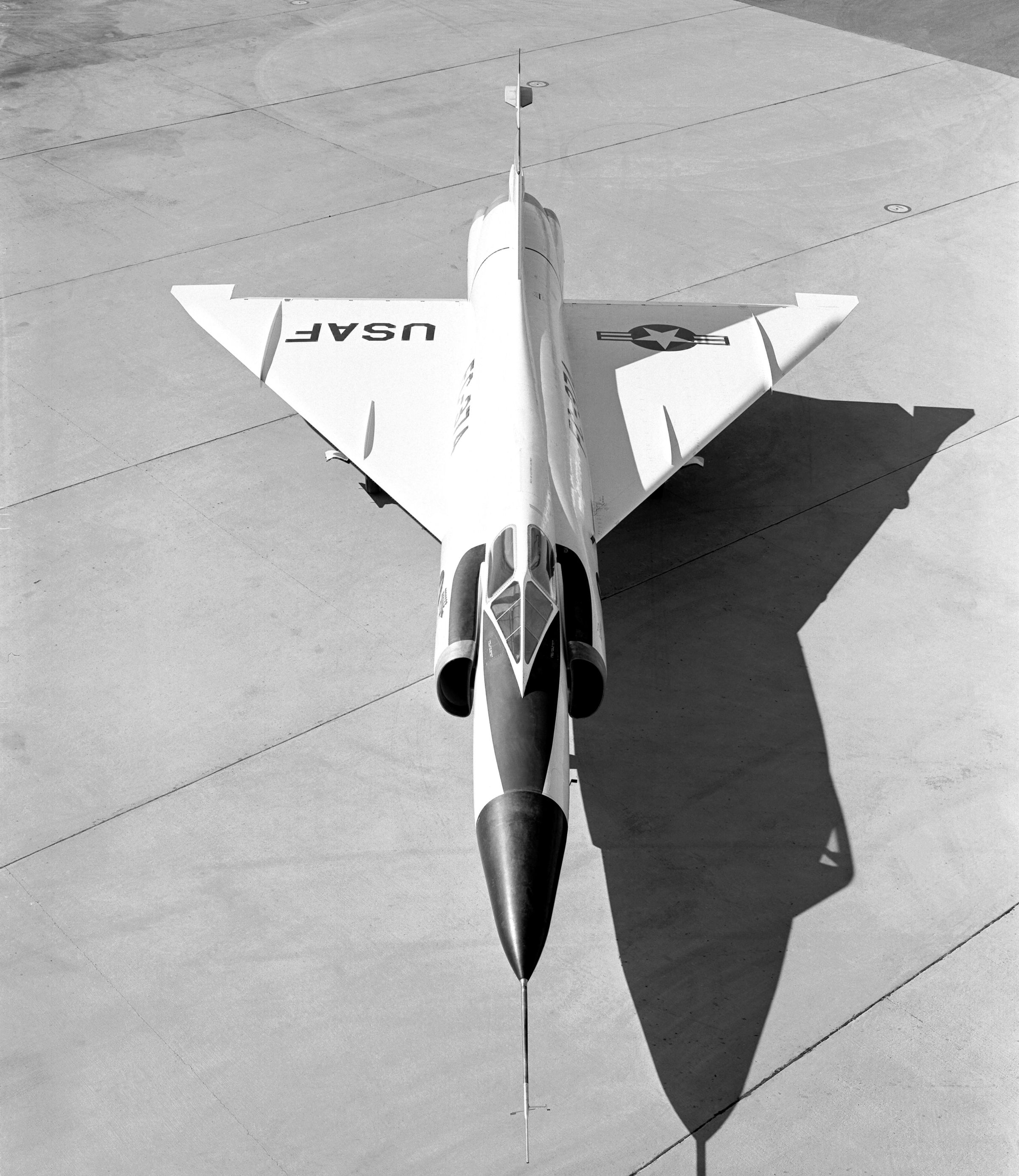
YF-102A with pinched "area rule" fuselage, narrower canopy, and redesigned intakes

During mid-1953, Convair concluded that it needed to take action to address the F-102's shortcomings to prevent its cancellation, so promptly embarked on a major redesign effort. Convair decided to incorporate the recently discovered area rule, the application of which simultaneously simplified both production and maintenance of the aircraft. This redesign entailed the lengthening of the fuselage by 11 ft (3.4 m), being "pinched" at the midsection (dubbed the "Coke bottle configuration"), with two large fairings on either side of the engine nozzle and revised intakes, and a new, narrower canopy. A more powerful model of the J57 was installed, while the aircraft structure was also lightened.

In parallel to this effort, the wing was also redesigned to be both thinner and wider. The leading edge was reprofiled with a conical droop, with the apex at the root, to improve handling at low speeds. Because the droop remained within the shock cone of the leading edge, the drag rise at supersonic speeds was minimal. A second, inboard fence was also added at the time. A new canopy was also adopted, and the tail was shifted slightly aft. The level of changes that could be implemented were restrained by the redesign having occurred at such an advanced stage of development. Yet, the overall changes made were so substantial that two-thirds of the roughly 30,000 tools created to manufacture the YF-102 were scrapped or modified before quantity production had even commenced.

On 20 December 1954, the first revised aircraft, designated YF-102A, made its first flight only 118 days after work on the redesign had started. The next day, it exceeded Mach 1 for the first time. The revised design quickly demonstrated that it could attain a speed of Mach 1.22 and a ceiling of 53,000 ft (16,000 m). These performance improvements were sufficient for the USAF to agree to procure the F-102; accordingly, a new production contract was signed during March 1954. On 24 June 1955, the first flight of a production-standard F-102 occurred. From the 26th production aircraft onwards, a taller vertical tail with a 40% greater surface area was fitted to counteract flutter and a lack of directional control at high speeds; existing aircraft were also retrofitted with this change.

=== Further development ===
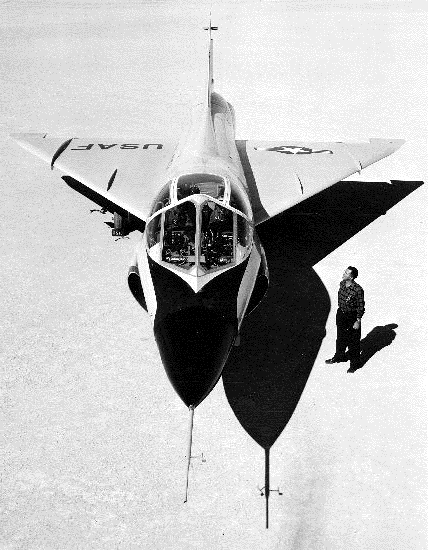
A TF-102A, illustrating the widened cockpit

The production F-102A had the Hughes MC-3 FCS, which was later upgraded in service to the MG-10; it was used to locate enemy targets, steer interception courses, and control weapons deployment. The F-102 was the first USAF fighter to be designed without a gun, instead relying on missiles as its primary armament. It had a three-segmented internal weapons bay under the fuselage for air-to-air missiles. Initial armament was three pairs of GAR-1/2/3/4 (later redesignated as AIM-4) Falcon missiles, which included both infrared homing and semiactive radar homing variants. The doors of the two forward bays each had tubes for 12 folding-fin aerial rockets for a total of 24, with initially 2-inch (51 mm) rockets being fitted and later 2.75-inch (70 mm) ones replacing them. The F-102 was later upgraded to allow up to two GAR-11/AIM-26 nuclear Falcon missiles to be carried in the center bay. The larger size of this weapon required redesigned center bay doors with no rocket tubes. Plans were considered to fit the MB-1 Genie nuclear rocket to the design; although a Genie was test fired from a YF-102A in May 1956, it was never adopted.

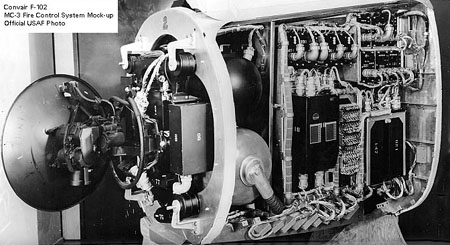
Hughes MC-3 fire control system and radar antenna

The F-102 received several major modifications during its operational lifetime, with most airframes being retrofitted with infrared search and tracking systems, radar warning receivers, transponders, backup artificial horizons, and improvements to the FCS. A proposed close-support version (never built) would have incorporated an internal Gatling gun and an extra two hardpoints for bombs, supplementing the two underwing pylons with which all production F-102s were fitted for drop tanks (the use of which reduced the craft to subsonic performance). To alleviate this, bigger internal fuel tanks and an in-flight-refueling probe were fitted.

In response to a USAF request for a specialized twin-seat trainer, Convair began development of the TF-102A in April 1952. The side-by-side seating design, popularized in the 1950s (and used with the American Cessna T-37, British Hawker Hunter T.7, and English Electric Lightning T.4, among others), would require a redesign of the cockpit and a nose almost as wide as that of a Convair 340 commercial airliner. Development was put on hold, despite being authorized on 16 April 1953, until issues with the fighter model were sufficiently addressed; the first firm order for the TF-102A was issued in July 1954, and a maiden flight made on 8 November 1955. The new nose introduced buffeting, the source of which was traced to the bulbous canopy. Vortex generators were added to the top of the canopy to prevent the buffet, which had started around Mach 0.72. The intake ducts were revised as the inlets were repositioned. Despite the many changes, the aircraft was combat-capable, although this variant was predictably slower, reaching only subsonic speeds in level flight. A total of 111 TF-102As eventually was manufactured.

The numerous inherent design and technical limitations of the F-102 led to a proposed successor, initially known as the F-102B Ultimate Interceptor. The improved design, in which the proposed Curtiss-Wright J67 jet engine eventually was replaced by a Pratt & Whitney J75, underwent so many aerodynamic changes (including variable-geometry inlets) that it essentially became an entirely new aircraft and hence was redesignated and produced as the F-106 Delta Dart. Convair also used a delta-wing design in the Mach 2 class Convair B-58 Hustler bomber.

== Operational history ==
=== Introduction to service ===
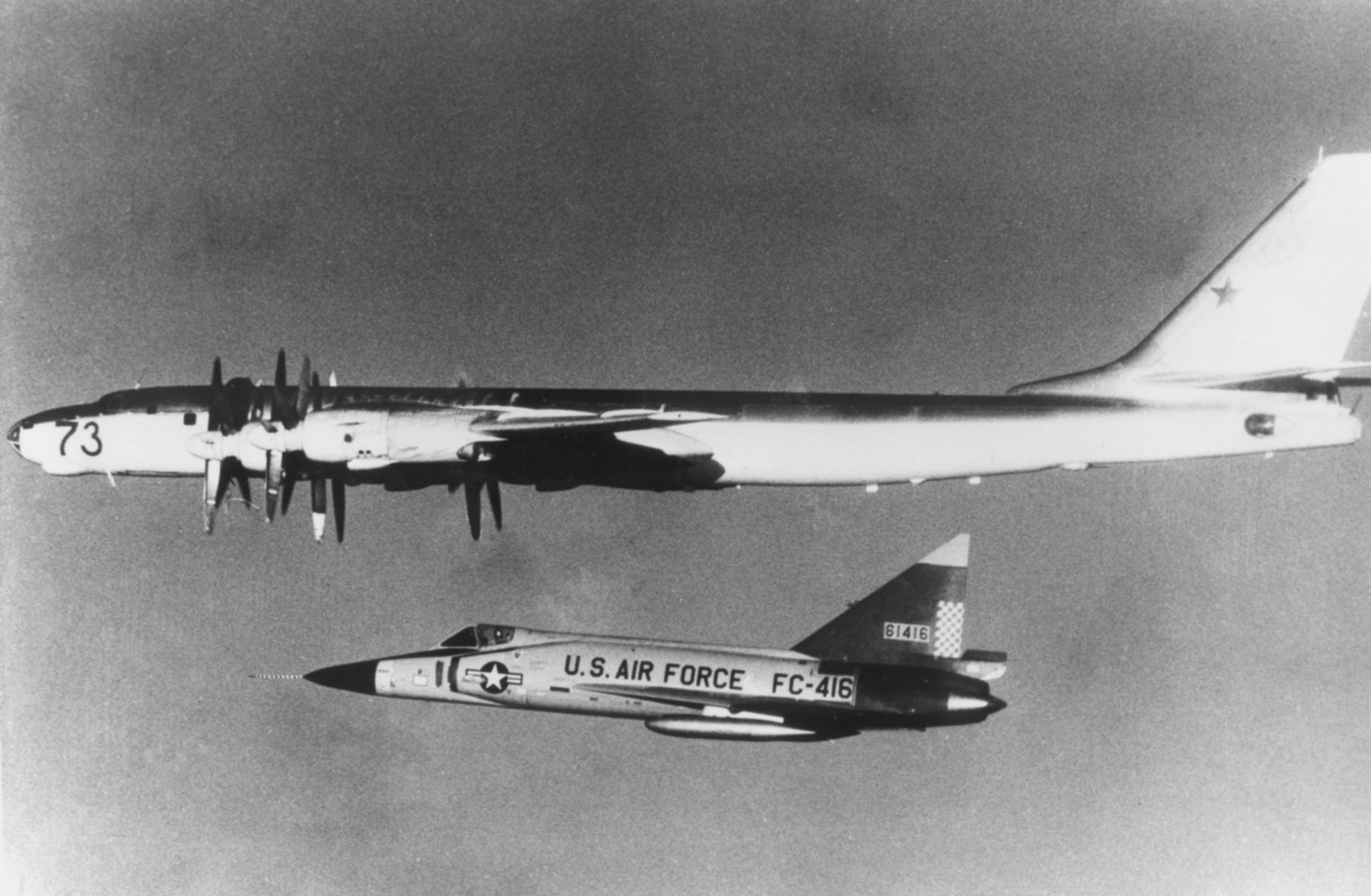
An F-102A of the 57th FIS intercepting a Soviet Tu-95 off Iceland, July 1970

In June 1956, operational use of the F-102A commenced, the first unit to be equipped with the type being the 327th Fighter-Interceptor Squadron, which was initially based at George Air Force Base. In June 1958, the 327th was redeployed to Thule Air Base on Greenland, the USAF's northernmost base, which permitted the interception of Soviet aircraft at a greater distance from the continental United States. Other overseas units, such as the United States Air Forces in Europe (USAFE) and the 57th Fighter-Interceptor Squadron, based at Keflavik, Iceland, would similarly adopt the type and as such used the F-102 in the interceptor role through into the early 1970s until it was displaced by the arrival of newer fighter aircraft. Typical interceptions included Soviet long range reconnaissance flights and bomber patrols over the Atlantic Ocean along with various aircraft that were flying to and from Cuba.

The F-102's official name, "Delta Dagger", was never used in common parlance, with the aircraft being universally known as the "Deuce". The TF-102 was known as the "Tub" because of its wider fuselage to accommodate its side-by-side twin seating arrangement.

During the decades in which the F-102A was in service, several new wing designs were used to experiment with the application of increased conical camber to the wings. Ultimately, a design was selected that actually increased elevon area, reduced takeoff speed, improved the supersonic L/D ratio and increased the aircraft's ceiling to 56,000 ft (17,000 m). A modification was required to the landing gear doors due to the wing redesign.

By 1960, the Air Defense Command (ADC) had F-102 Delta Daggers in service. Throughout the 1960s, a considerable number of the ADC's TF-102s and F-102s were stationed at Perrin AFB, Texas, for the purpose of training new F-102 pilots. They also provided platform training on flight characteristics of delta-winged aircraft for pilots who were destined to fly the B-58 Hustler bomber for the Strategic Air Command (SAC).

The type continued to serve in large numbers with both Air Force and Air National Guard units well into the 1970s. George W. Bush, later President of the United States, flew the F-102 in the 147th Fighter Interceptor Group based at Ellington AFB in Houston, Texas as part of his Texas Air National Guard service from 1968 to 1972.

=== Vietnam War service ===
The F-102 served in the Vietnam War, flying fighter patrols and serving as bomber escorts. A total of 14 aircraft were lost in Vietnam: one to air-to-air combat, several to ground fire and the remainder to accidents.

Initially, F-102 detachments began to be sent to bases in Southeast Asia in 1962 after radar contacts detected by ground radars were thought to possibly be North Vietnamese Vietnam People's Air Force (VPAF) Il-28 "Beagle" bombers – considered to be a credible threat in that time period. The F-102s were sent to Thailand and other nearby countries to intercept these aircraft if they threatened South Vietnam.

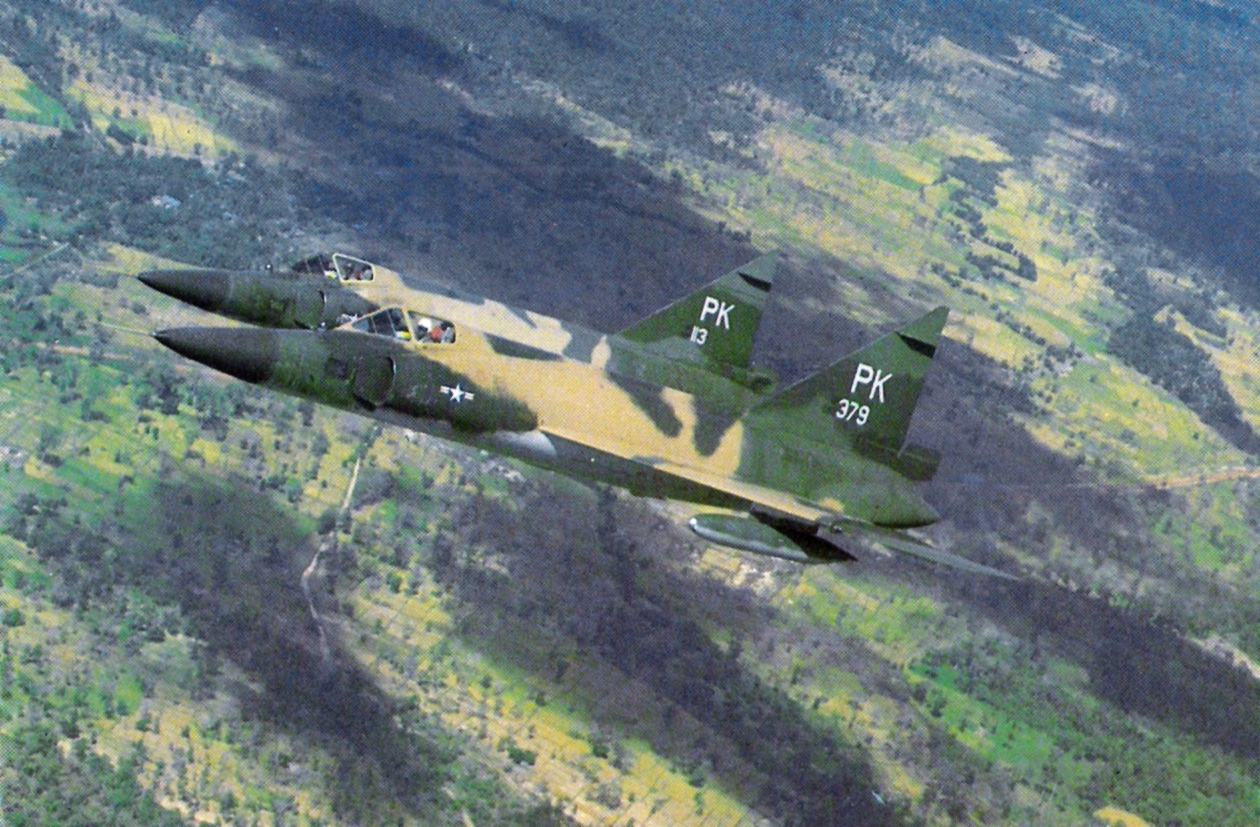
F-102As of the 509th FIS over Vietnam, November 1966. These aircraft wear standard Southeast Asia camouflage (T.O. 1-1-4).

Later on, Boeing B-52 Stratofortress strikes, codenamed "Arc Light", were escorted by F-102s based in the theater. During one of these missions an F-102 was shot down by a VPAF Mikoyan-Gurevich MiG-21 using an AA-2 Atoll heat-seeking missile. The MiGs approached undetected, and one of the F-102s was hit by an air-to-air missile, which did not explode immediately, but remained lodged in the aft end of the aircraft, causing stability problems. As the pilot reported the problem to his wingman, the wingman observed the damaged Delta Dagger explode in midair, killing the pilot. This was the only air-to-air loss for the F-102 during the Vietnam War. The other F-102 pilot fired AIM-4 missiles at the departing MiG-21s, but no hit was recorded.

The F-102 was occasionally employed in the air-to-ground role with limited success, although neither the aircraft nor the training for its pilots were designed for that role. The 509th Fighter-Interceptor Squadron's (FIS) Deuces arrived at Da Nang Air Base from Clark Air Base, Philippines, on 4 August 1964. The interceptor was equipped with 24 2.75-inch (70 mm) FFARs in the fuselage bay doors; these could be used to good effect against various types of North Vietnamese targets in daylight. At night, it proved less dangerous to use heat-seeking Falcon missiles in conjunction with the F-102's nose-mounted IRST (Infrared Search & Track), thus it often performed nighttime harassment raids along the Ho Chi Minh Trail. Some F-102As were configured to accommodate a single AIM-26 Super Falcon in each side bay in lieu of the two conventional AIM-4 Falcons. Operations with both the F-102A and TF-102A two-seaters (which were used in a Forward Air Control role because its two seats and 2.75 in (70 mm) rockets offered good versatility for the mission) continued in Vietnam until 1968 when all F-102s were returned to the United States.

Summary of (14) USAF F-102 Delta Daggers lost in the Vietnam War 1964–1969
Date	F-102 model	Unit	Cause of loss/remarks
27 November 1964	F-102A	509th FIS	Engine failure.
1 July 1965	F-102A	509th FIS	(3) F-102As destroyed on the ground by enemy sappers at Da Nang Air Base.
15 December 1965	F-102A	509th FIS	Downed by ground fire while providing close air support (CAS).
19 August 1966	F-102A	509th FIS	Operational loss, crashed during night landing.
14 December 1966	F-102A	64th FIS	Downed by small arms fire within 60 seconds after takeoff.
15 January 1967	TF-102A	509th FIS	Operational loss, ferry mission.
2 April 1967	F-102A	509th FIS	Operational loss, engine failure. Also served with 16th & 64th FIS.
12 May 1967	F-102A	509th FIS	Destroyed during enemy ground attack; mortar fire at Biên Hòa Air Base.
3 February 1968	F-102A	509th FIS	Downed by MiG-21 K-13 (missile) at 36,000 feet (11,000 m).
16 July 1968	F-102A	509th FIS	Operational loss, engine failure.
16 September 1968	F-102A	509th FIS	Operational loss, ground collision after landing with an RF-4 Phantom II.
7 January 1969	F-102A	509th FIS	Operational loss, engine failure.

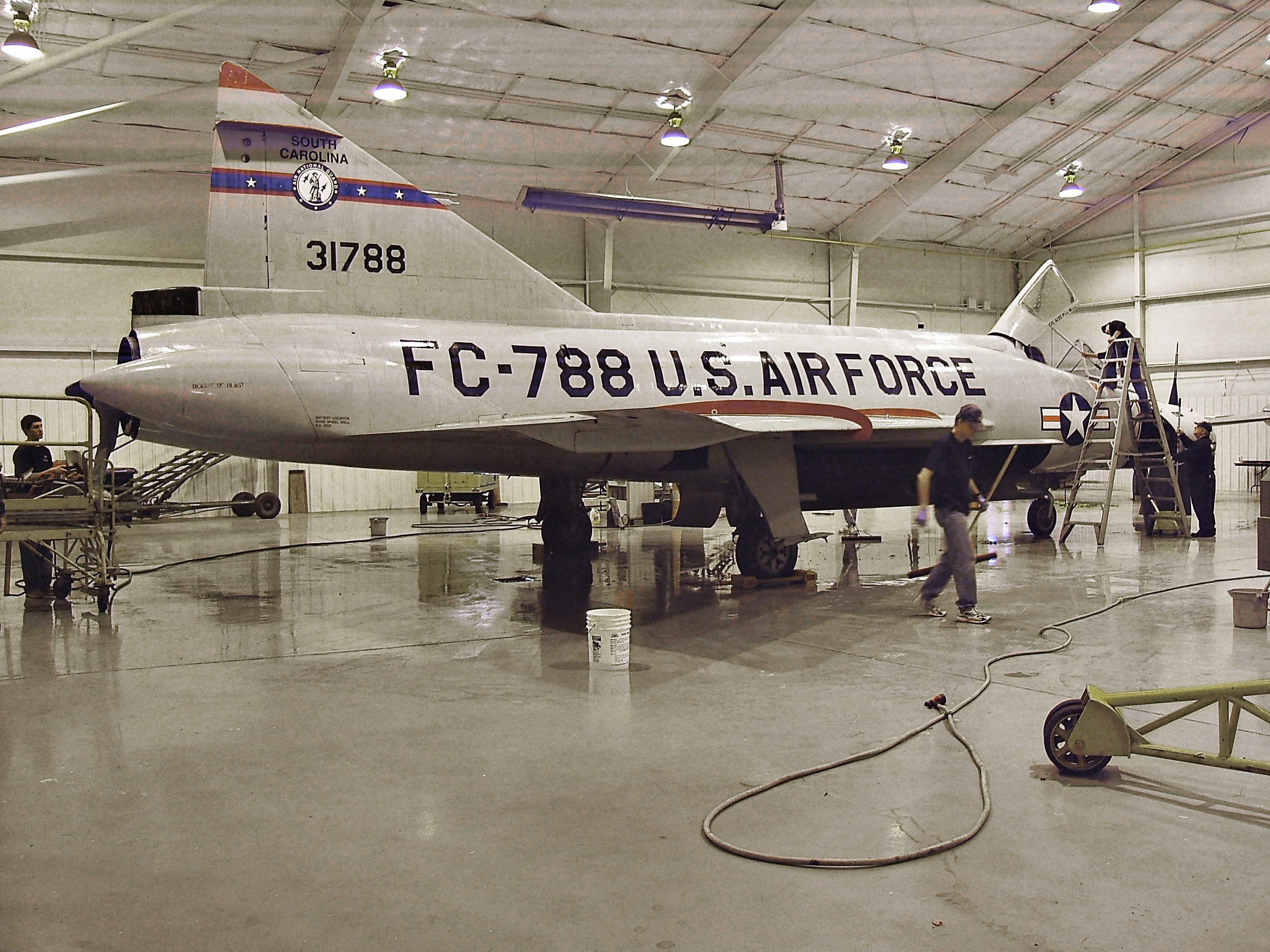
Carolinas Aviation Museum's South Carolina Air National Guard F-102 being washed by US Airways employees.

=== Later use ===
During 1973, six aircraft were converted to target drones as QF-102As and later PQM-102Bs (simulating MiG-21 threat aircraft) under a Full Scale Aerial Target (FSAT) project known as Pave Deuce. Eventually, the program converted hundreds of F-102s for use as target drones for newer fighter aircraft, as well as testing of the U.S. Army's Patriot missile system.

The F-102 and TF-102 were exported overseas to both Turkey and Greece. The Turkish F-102s saw combat missions during the 1974 Turkish invasion of Cyprus. There have been claims of air combat between Greek F-5s and Turkish F-102s above the Aegean Sea during the Turkish invasion. A Greek internet website editor, Demetrius Stergiou, claims that the Greek F-5s had shot down two Turkish F-102s, while the Turkish side has claimed that their F-102s had shot down two Greek F-5s; however, both Greece and Turkey still officially deny any aircraft losses. The F-102 was finally retired from both of those air forces in 1979.

In 1976, the F-102 was withdrawn from U.S. service, while the last QF-102A / PQM-102B drone was expended in 1986. As of 2023, no F-102s remain in flyable condition, although many can be seen at museums or as permanent static displays as gate guardians at Air Force and Air National Guard installations.

== Variants ==
YF-102
Prototypes. Non area-ruled fuselage. Powered by 14,500 lb (64 kN) J57-P-11, two built.
YF-102A
Area-ruled prototypes. Powered by 16,000 lb (71 kN) J57-P-23. Four converted from pre-production aircraft.
F-102A
Production Model. Initial eight pre-production aircraft built with non-area ruled fuselage. Remainder built (879) with area ruled fuselage.
TF-102A
Two-seat training version, 111 built.
F-102B
The original designation of the F-106A.
F-102C
Proposed tactical attack version with J57-P-47 engine. Two converted As, as YF-102C engineering test beds.
QF-102A
Target drones converted from the F-102A. Six built.
PQM-102A
Unpiloted target drones. 65 converted.
PQM-102B
Revised target drone conversion, capable of being flown remotely or by pilot in cockpit. 146 converted.

== Operators ==
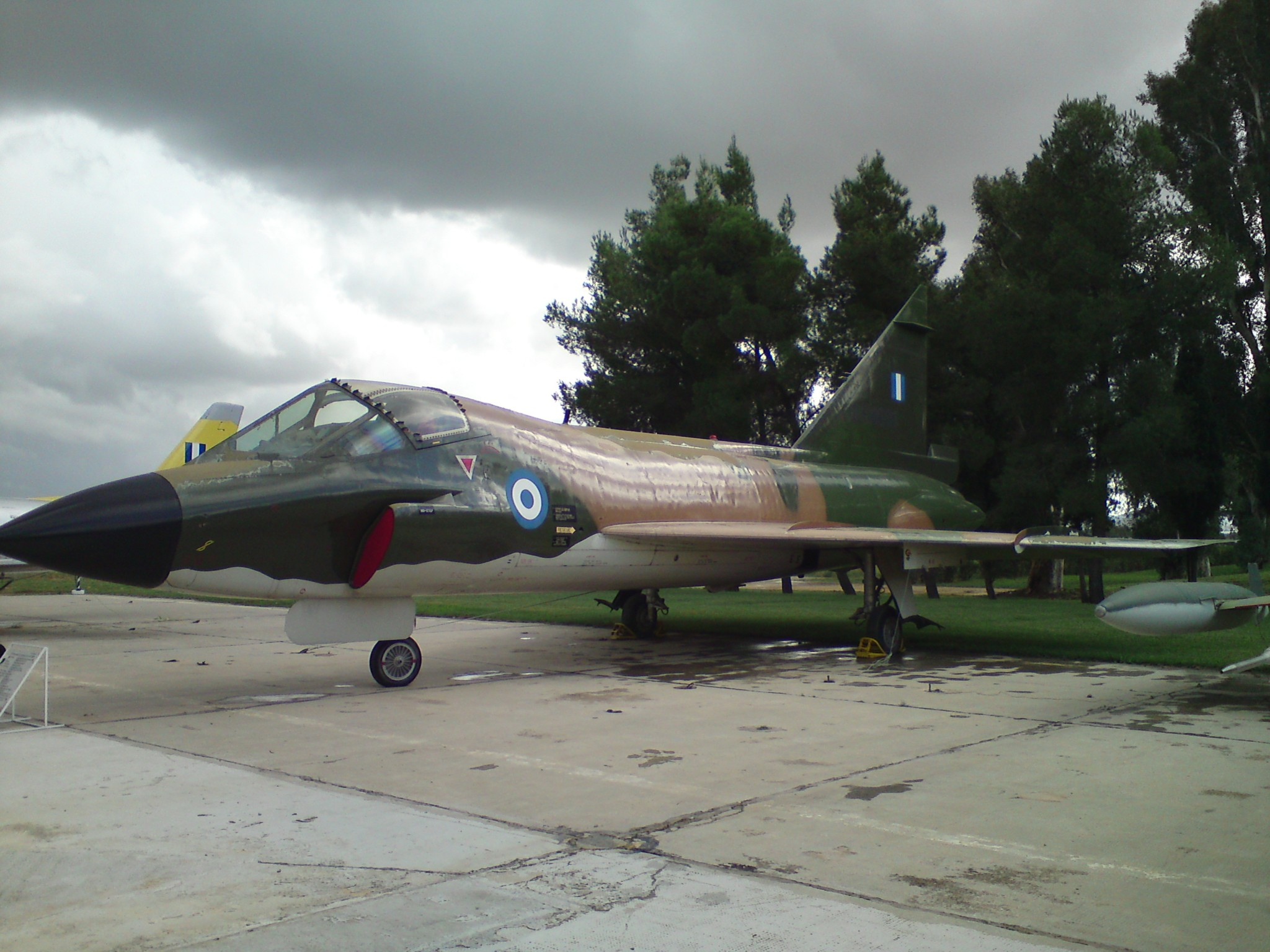
A Hellenic Air Force TF-102A Delta Dagger at the Hellenic Air Force Museum, at Dekeleia AFB. Shows vortex generators added to the canopy to prevent buffet.

Greece

Hellenic Air Force

In 1969, Greece acquired 24 of these aircraft for use by the 342nd All-Weather Squadron at Tanagra Air Base. 19 of them were single-seat F-102As, five were two-seat TF-102As. They served with the Greek air force until 1977, when the F-102s were replaced by Mirage F1CG fighters.

Turkey

Turkish Air Force

Beginning in 1968, approximately 50 F-102As and TF-102As were transferred to Turkey from USAF stocks. Before transfer to Turkey, they were overhauled by CASA in Seville. They were initially assigned to the 191st Filo (Squadron) based at Murted, replacing the F-84F Thunderstreaks previously assigned to this unit. This unit was redesignated 142nd Filo in early 1973. In 1971, F-102s were also assigned to the 182nd Filo based at Diyarbakır, replacing the F-84Fs previously being flown by this unit. F-102s remained in service with these two squadrons until mid-1979, when they were replaced by the F-104G in the 142nd Filo and by the F-100C in the 182nd Filo.

United States

United States Air Force

Air Defense Command / Aerospace Defense Command

2nd Fighter-Interceptor Squadron – Suffolk County AFB (1956–1959)
5th Fighter-Interceptor Squadron – Suffolk County AFB (1956–1960)
11th Fighter-Interceptor Squadron – Duluth AFB (1956–1960)
18th Fighter-Interceptor Squadron – Wurtsmith AFB (1957–1960)
27th Fighter-Interceptor Squadron – Griffiss AFB (1957–1959)
31st Fighter-Interceptor Squadron – Wurtsmith AFB (1956–1957); transferred to Alaska Air Command
37th Fighter-Interceptor Squadron – Ethan Allen AFB (1957–1960)
47th Fighter-Interceptor Squadron – Niagara Falls AFB (1958–1960)
48th Fighter-Interceptor Squadron – Langley AFB (1957–1960)
57th Fighter-Interceptor Squadron – Naval Station Keflavik (1962–1973)
59th Fighter-Interceptor Squadron – Goose Bay AFB(1960–1966)
61st Fighter-Interceptor Squadron – Truax Field (1957–1960)
64th Fighter-Interceptor Squadron – McChord AFB (1957–1960), Paine Field (1960–1966)
71st Fighter-Interceptor Squadron – Selfridge AFB (1958–1960)
76th Fighter-Interceptor Squadron – Westover AFB (1961–1963)
82d Fighter-Interceptor Squadron – Travis AFB (1957–1966)
86th Fighter-Interceptor Squadron – Youngstown AFB (1957–1960)
87th Fighter-Interceptor Squadron – Lockbourne AFB (1958–1960)
95th Fighter-Interceptor Squadron – Andrews AFB (1958–1959)
317th Fighter-Interceptor Squadron – McChord AFB (1957–1958)
318th Fighter-Interceptor Squadron – McChord AFB (1957–1960)
323d Fighter-Interceptor Squadron – Truax Field (1956–1957), Harmon AFB (1957–1960)
325th Fighter-Interceptor Squadron – Truax Field (1957–1966)
326th Fighter-Interceptor Squadron – Richards-Gebaur AFB (1957–1967)
327th Fighter-Interceptor Squadron – George AFB (1956–1958), Thule AB (1958–1960)
329th Fighter-Interceptor Squadron – George AFB (1958–1960)
331st Fighter-Interceptor Squadron – Webb AFB (1960–1963)
332nd Fighter-Interceptor Squadron – McGuire AFB (1957–1959), England AFB (1959–1960), Thule AB (1960–1965)
438th Fighter-Interceptor Squadron – Kincheloe AFB (1957–1960)
456th Fighter-Interceptor Squadron – Castle AFB (1958–1960)
460th Fighter-Interceptor Squadron – Portland AFB (1958–1966)
482nd Fighter-Interceptor Squadron – Seymour Johnson AFB (1956–1965)
498th Fighter-Interceptor Squadron – Geiger Field (1957–1959)

Alaskan Air Command

31st Fighter-Interceptor Squadron – Elmendorf AFB (1957–1958)
317th Fighter-Interceptor Squadron – Elmendorf AFB (1958–1970)

United States Air Forces in Europe

32d Fighter-Interceptor Squadron – Soesterberg AB (1960–1969)
431st Fighter-Interceptor Squadron – Zaragosa AB (1960–1964)
496th Fighter-Interceptor Squadron – Hahn AB (1960–1970)
497th Fighter-Interceptor Squadron – Torrejon AB (1960–1963)
525th Fighter-Interceptor Squadron – Bitburg AB (1959–1969)
526th Fighter-Interceptor Squadron – Ramstein AB (1960–1970)

Pacific Air Forces

4th Fighter-Interceptor Squadron – Misawa AB (1957–1965)
16th Fighter-Interceptor Squadron – Naha AB (1959–1965)
40th Fighter-Interceptor Squadron – Yokota AB (1957–1965)
64th Fighter-Interceptor Squadron – Clark AB (1966–1969)
68th Fighter-Interceptor Squadron – Itazuke AB (1957–1965)
82d Fighter-Interceptor Squadron – Naha AB (1966–1971)
509th Fighter-Interceptor Squadron – Clark AB (1959–1970)

Air National Guard

102d Fighter-Interceptor Squadron, NY ANG – Suffolk County ANGB (1972–1975)
111th Fighter-Interceptor Squadron, TX ANG – Ellington Field (1960–1975)
116th Fighter-Interceptor Squadron, WA ANG – Geiger Field (1965–1969)
118th Fighter-Interceptor Squadron, CT ANG – Bradley ANGB (1966–1971)
122nd Fighter-Interceptor Squadron, LA ANG – NAS New Orleans (1960–1971)
123d Fighter-Interceptor Squadron, OR ANG – Portland ANGB (1966–1971)
132nd Fighter-Interceptor Squadron, ME ANG – Bangor ANGB (1969–1970)
134th Fighter-Interceptor Squadron, VT ANG – Burlington ANGB (1965–1975)
146th Fighter-Interceptor Squadron, PA ANG – Pittsburgh AP (1961–1975)
151st Fighter-Interceptor Squadron, TN ANG – McGhee-Tyson ANGB (1963–1964)
152d Fighter-Interceptor Squadron, AZ ANG – Tucson ANGB (1966–1969)
157th Fighter-Interceptor Squadron, SC ANG – MacEntire ANGB (1963–1975)
159th Fighter-Interceptor Squadron, FL ANG – Imeson Field (1960–1968), Jacksonville ANGB 1968–1974
175th Fighter-Interceptor Squadron, SD ANG – Sioux Falls Air Force Base (1960–1970)
176th Fighter-Interceptor Squadron, WI ANG – Truax Field (1966–1974)
178th Fighter-Interceptor Squadron, ND ANG – Hector Field (1966–1969)
179th Fighter-Interceptor Squadron, MN ANG – Duluth ANGB (1966–1971)
182nd Fighter-Interceptor Squadron, TX ANG – Kelly AFB (1960–1969)
186th Fighter-Interceptor Squadron, MT ANG – Great Falls ANGB (1966–1972)
190th Fighter-Interceptor Squadron, ID ANG – Gowen Field (1964–1975)
194th Fighter-Interceptor Squadron, CA ANG – Fresno ANGB (1964–1974)
196th Fighter-Interceptor Squadron, CA ANG – Ontario IAP (1965–1975)
199th Fighter-Interceptor Squadron, HI ANG – Hickam AFB (1960–1977)

National Aeronautics and Space Administration

Four F-102 (likely TF-102B versions) were provided to NASA for use by the Mercury astronauts.

== Aircraft on display ==
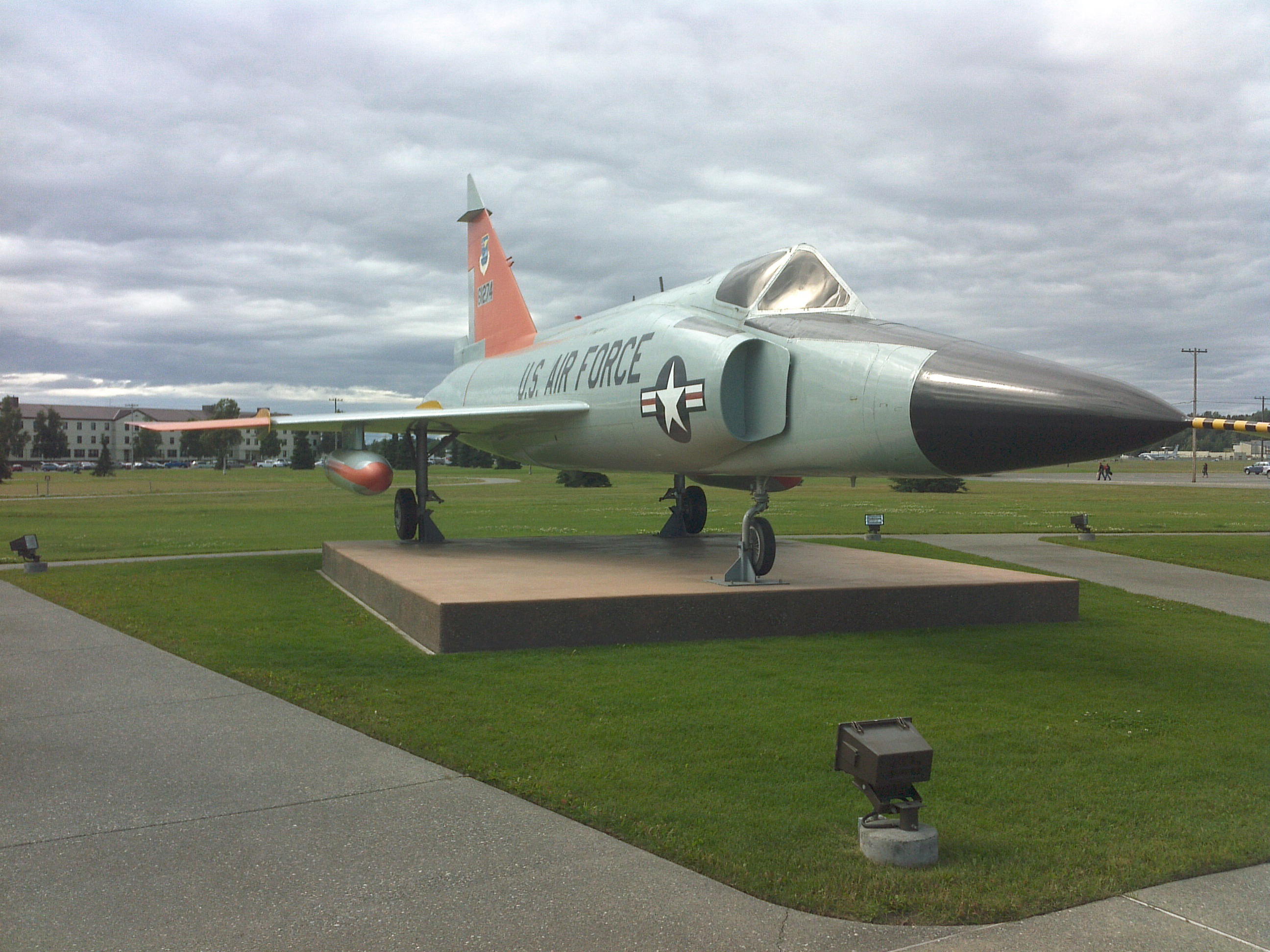
F-102 Delta Dagger from the 317th Fighter-Interceptor Squadron.

=== Canada ===
F-102A

- 56-1266 – Stephenville, Newfoundland. This aircraft was formerly of the U.S. 59th Fighter Interceptor Squadron, Goose Bay (Happy Valley), Labrador.

=== Germany ===
F-102A

- 56-1125 – Flugausstellung Peter Junior.

=== Greece ===
F-102A

- 56-1106 – Tanagra Air Base.
- 56-1232 – Larissa Air Base.

TF-102A

- 56-2355 – Hellenic Air Force Museum, Tatoi
- 55-4035 – Hellenic Air Force Museum, Tatoi.

=== Netherlands ===
F-102A

- 56-1052 – On display at the Nationaal Militair Museum, Soesterberg. Former Greek aircraft, painted as 56-1032, 32nd FIS USAF.

=== Turkey ===
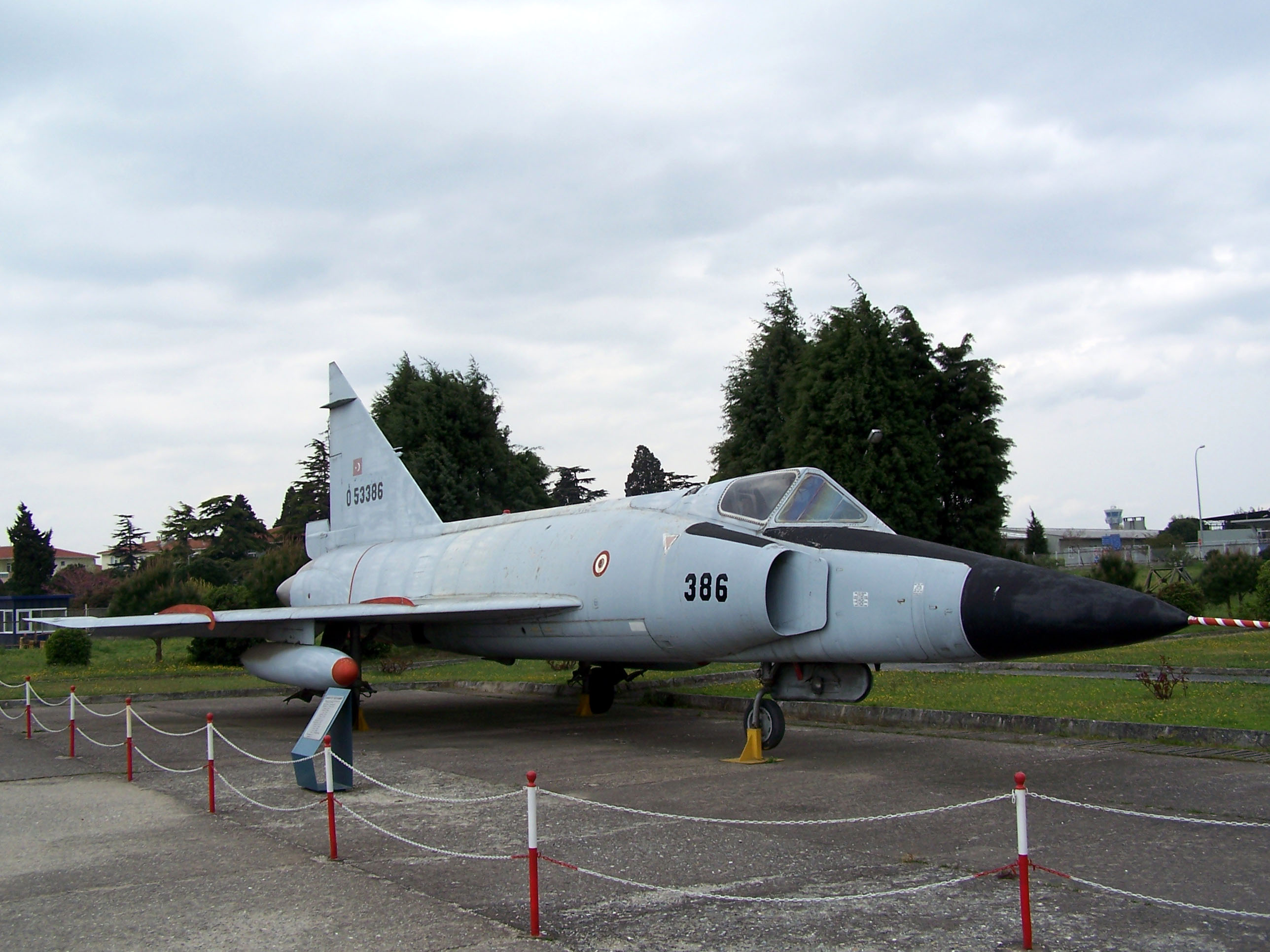
55-3386 at Istanbul Aviation Museum

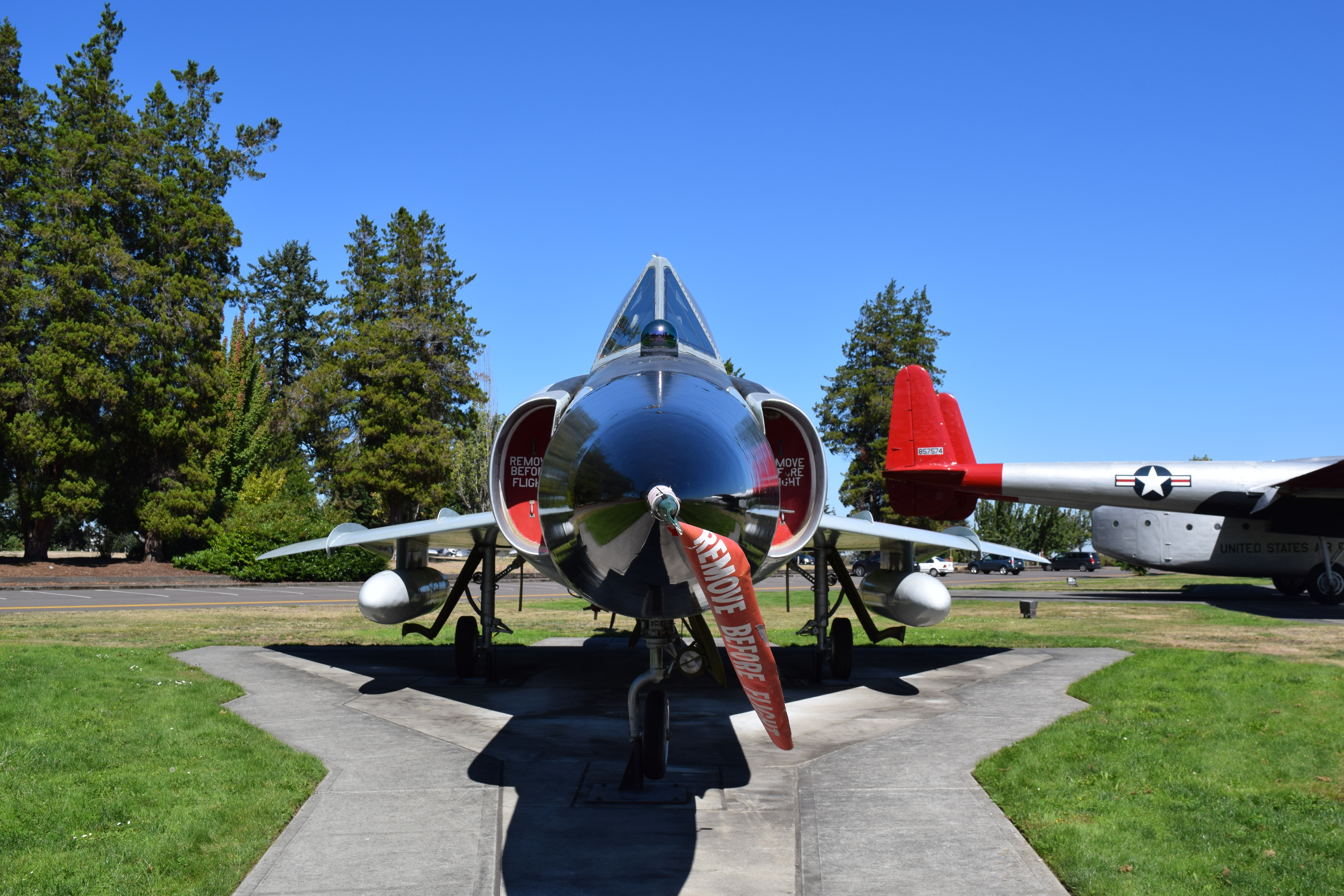
56-1515 head on view at McChord AFB

F-102A

- 55-3386 – Istanbul Aviation Museum.

TF-102A

- 62368/368 – Ankara Aviation Museum.
- 56-2368 – Istanbul Aviation Museum.

=== United States ===
YF-102A

- 53-1787 – Military Museum Air Park at Jackson Barracks, New Orleans, Louisiana.
- 53-1788 – Carolinas Aviation Museum, Charlotte, North Carolina.

TF-102A

- 54-1351 – Selfridge Military Air Museum, Selfridge ANGB, Mount Clemens, Michigan.
- 54-1353 – Century Circle at Edwards Air Force Base, near Rosamond, California
- 54-1366 – Pima Air and Space Museum adjacent to Davis-Monthan AFB in Tucson, Arizona.
- 56-2317 – Grissom Air Museum, Grissom Air Reserve Base (former Grissom AFB), Peru, Indiana.
- 56-2337 – Fort Worth Aviation Museum, Fort Worth, Texas.
- 56-2346 – Pennsylvania National Guard Military Museum, Pennsylvania National Guard Headquarters, Fort Indiantown Gap, Pennsylvania. (Aircraft was assigned to the Pennsylvania Air National Guard, at the 112th Fighter Interceptor Group, Pittsburgh International Airport, Coraopolis, Pennsylvania from 1960 to 1974 and is on loan from the National Museum of the United States Air Force).
- 56-2352 – Southern Museum of Flight, Birmingham, Alabama.
- 56-2353 – Wisconsin National Guard Memorial Library and Museum, Volk Field, Camp Douglas, Wisconsin.
- 56-2364 – Castle Air Museum, Atwater, California.

F-102A

- 53-1801 – Joe Foss Field Air National Guard Station (Sioux Falls Regional Airport) - 114th Fighter Wing, Sioux Falls, South Dakota.
- 53-1804 – Fresno Air National Guard Base - 144th Fighter Wing, Fresno, California.
- 53-1816 – Boise Idaho Military History Museum, Boise, Idaho.

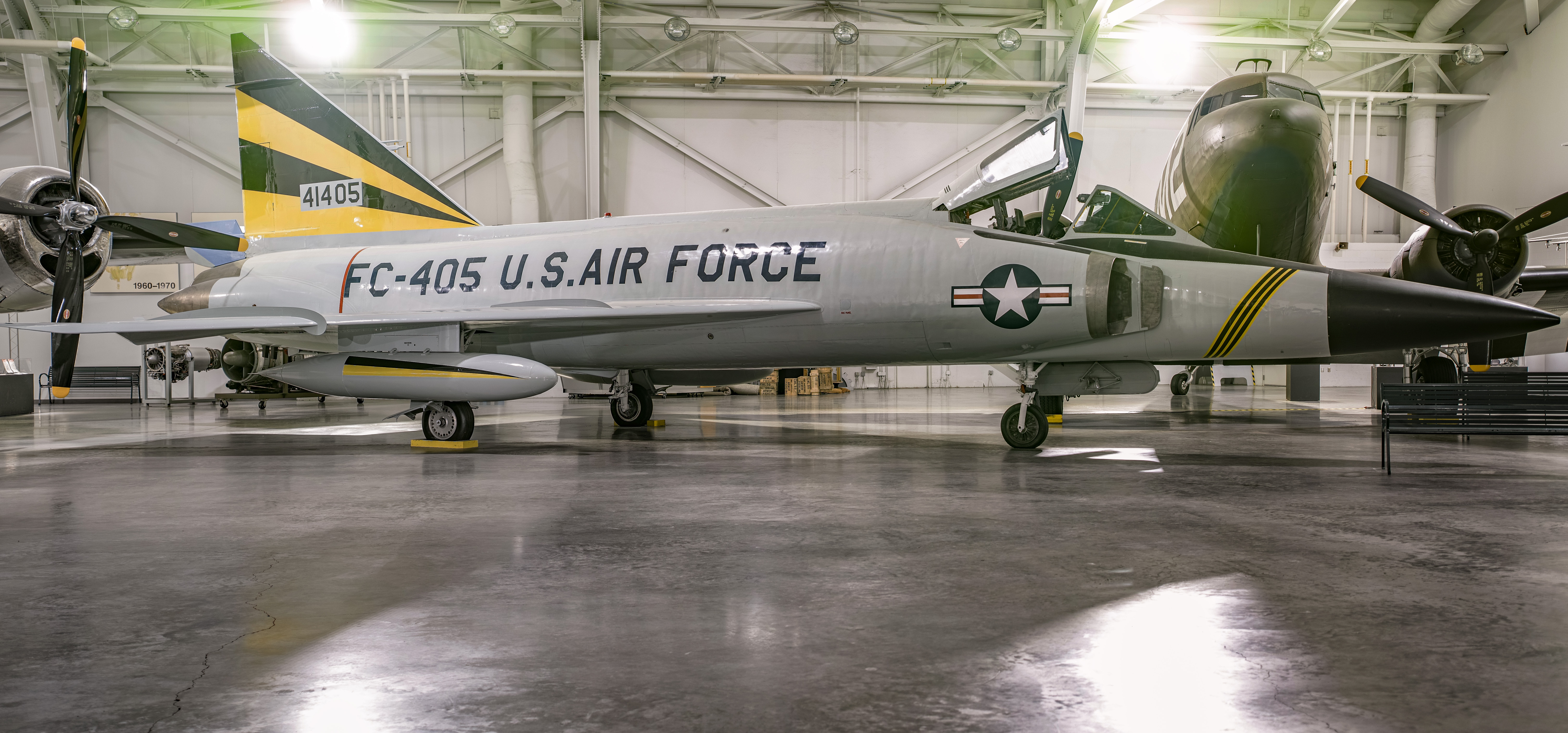
Convair F-102 Delta Dagger at the Strategic Air Command & Aerospace Museum near Ashland, Nebraska

- 54-1405 – Strategic Air and Space Museum, Ashland, Nebraska
- 54-1373 – Hickam AFB, Honolulu, Hawaii.
- 55-3366 – Pacific Aviation Museum, Ford Island, Honolulu, Hawaii.
- 56-0984 – Wings Over the Rockies Museum, (former Lowry AFB) Denver, Colorado.
- 56-0985 – McEntire Air National Guard Base, South Carolina.

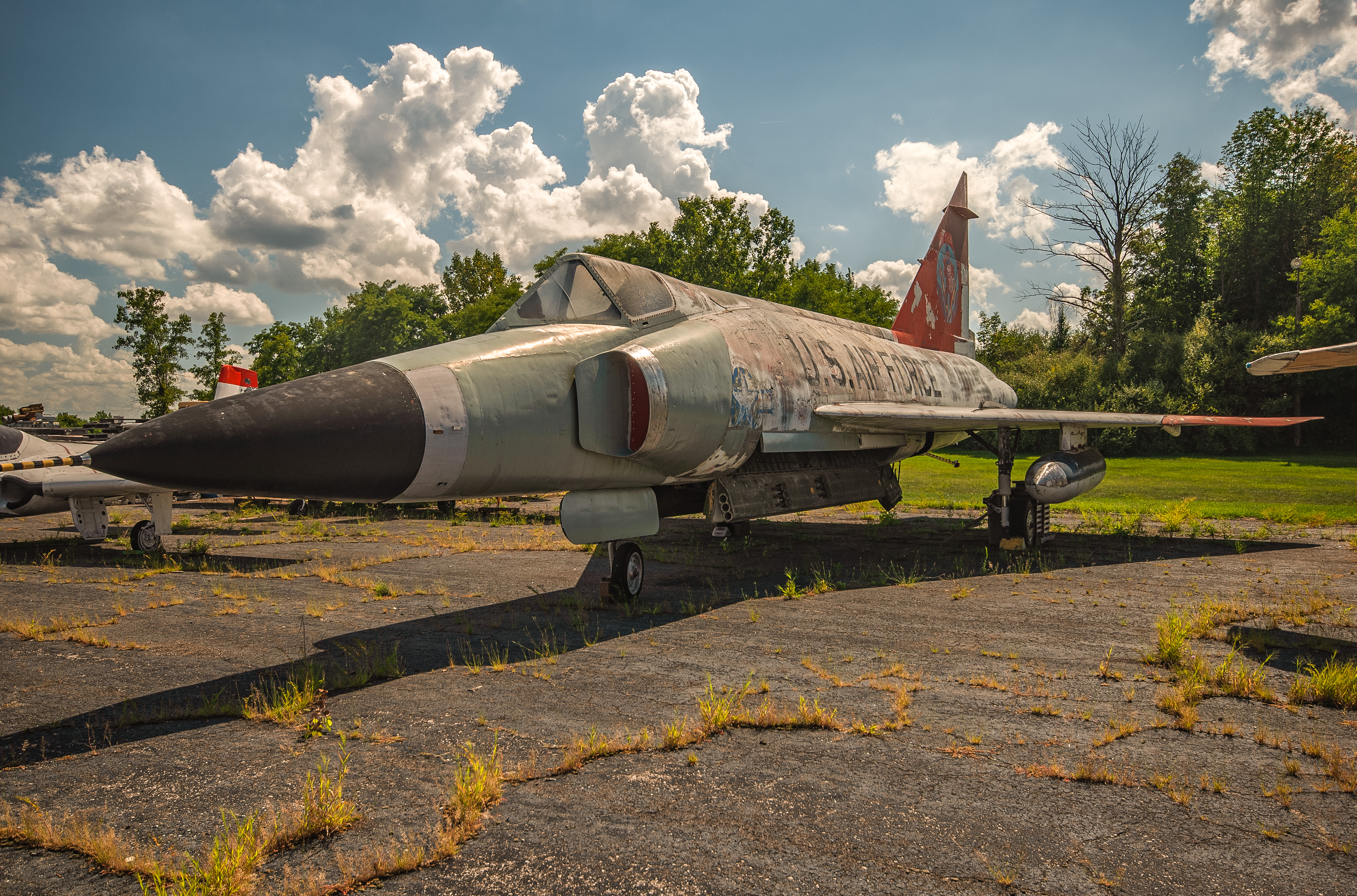
Convair F-102 Delta Dagger at the MAPS Air Museum at the Akron-Canton Airport in Ohio

- 56-0986 – MAPS Air Museum, Akron-Canton Regional Airport, Ohio.
- 56-1017 – South Dakota Air and Space Museum, Ellsworth AFB, Rapid City, South Dakota.
- 56–1053, (painted as 56–1274), – Alaska Heritage Park, Elmendorf AFB, Alaska.
- 56-1105 – Lions Park in Great Falls, Montana.
- 56-1109 – Peterson AFB, Colorado Springs, Colorado.
- 56-1114 – March Field Air Museum, March ARB (former March AFB), Riverside, California.
- 56-1115 – Fairchild AFB, Spokane, Washington.
- 56-1134 – Arizona ANGB, Tucson, Arizona.
- 56-1140 – Aerospace Museum of California, former McClellan AFB, Sacramento, California.
- 56-1151 – Museum of Aviation, Robins AFB, Warner Robins, Georgia.
- 56-1219 – Empire State Aerosciences Museum, Schenectady County Airport, New York.
- 56-1252 – Ellington Field Joint Reserve Base, Houston, Texas. Future President of the United States George W. Bush flew this model with the 147th Fighter Interceptor Group, 111th Fighter Interceptor Squadron of the Texas Air National Guard in the early 1970s. It is mounted on a pole that exits the burner. His name is on the canopy.
- 56-1264 – Air Force Armament Museum, Eglin Air Force Base, Valparaiso, Florida.

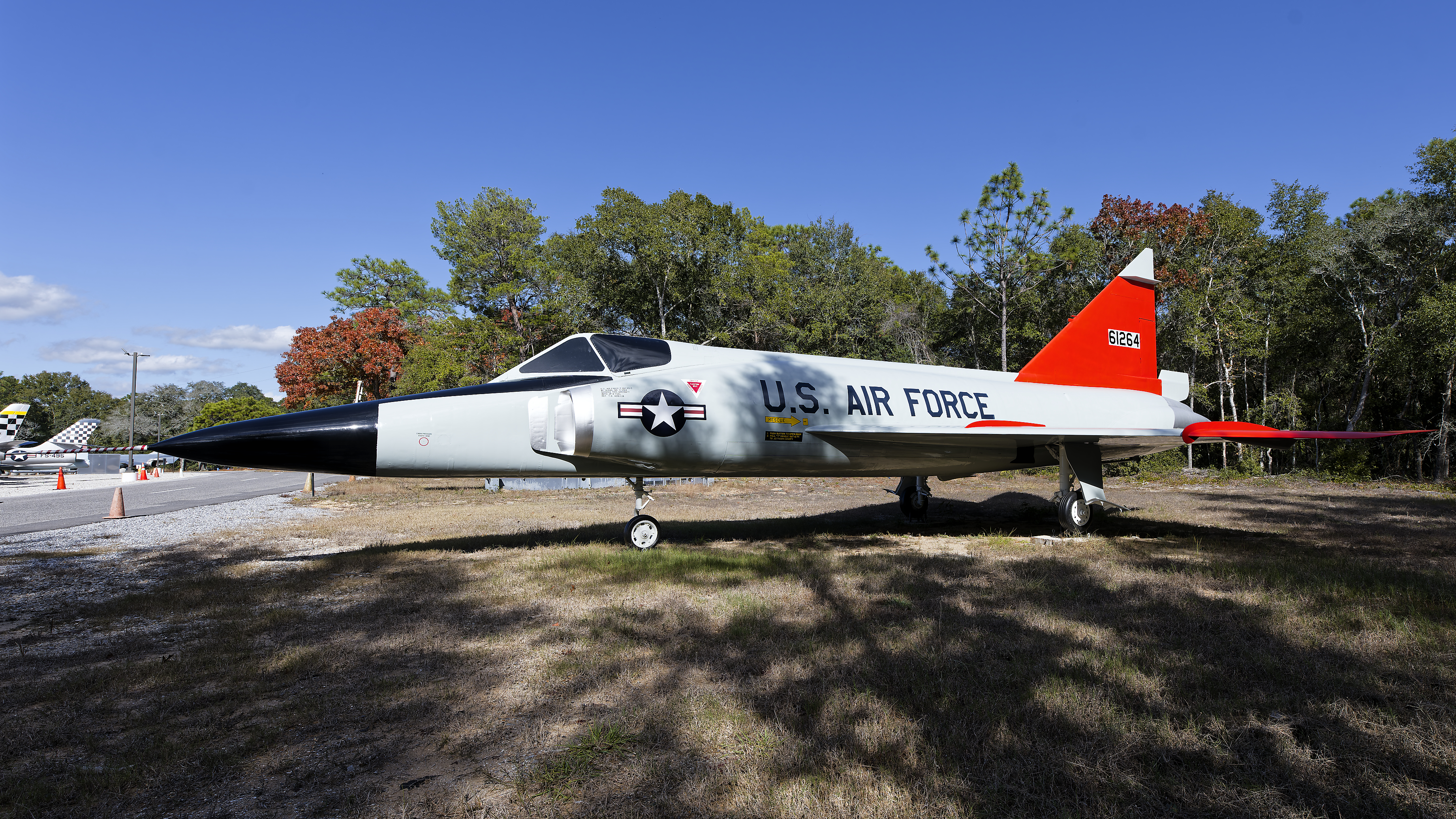
Convair F-102 Delta Dagger at the Air Force Armament Museum.

- 56-1268 – San Diego Air and Space Museum, El Cajon, California.
- 56-1273 – Wisconsin National Guard Memorial Library and Museum, Volk Field, Camp Douglas, Wisconsin.
- 56-1282 – Transportation and Industry Museum of Alaska, Wasilla, Alaska.
- 56–1325, (painted as 56–1476), – Minnesota Air National Guard Base, Minneapolis, Minnesota
- 56-1368 – Evergreen Aviation Museum, McMinnville, Oregon.
- 56-1393 – Pima Air and Space Museum adjacent to Davis-Monthan AFB in Tucson, Arizona.
- 56-1413 – Castle Air Museum (former Castle AFB), Atwater, California.
- 56-1415 – Pittsburgh IAP Air Reserve Station (located at Pittsburgh International Airport), Pittsburgh, Pennsylvania. Refurbished in 2010.

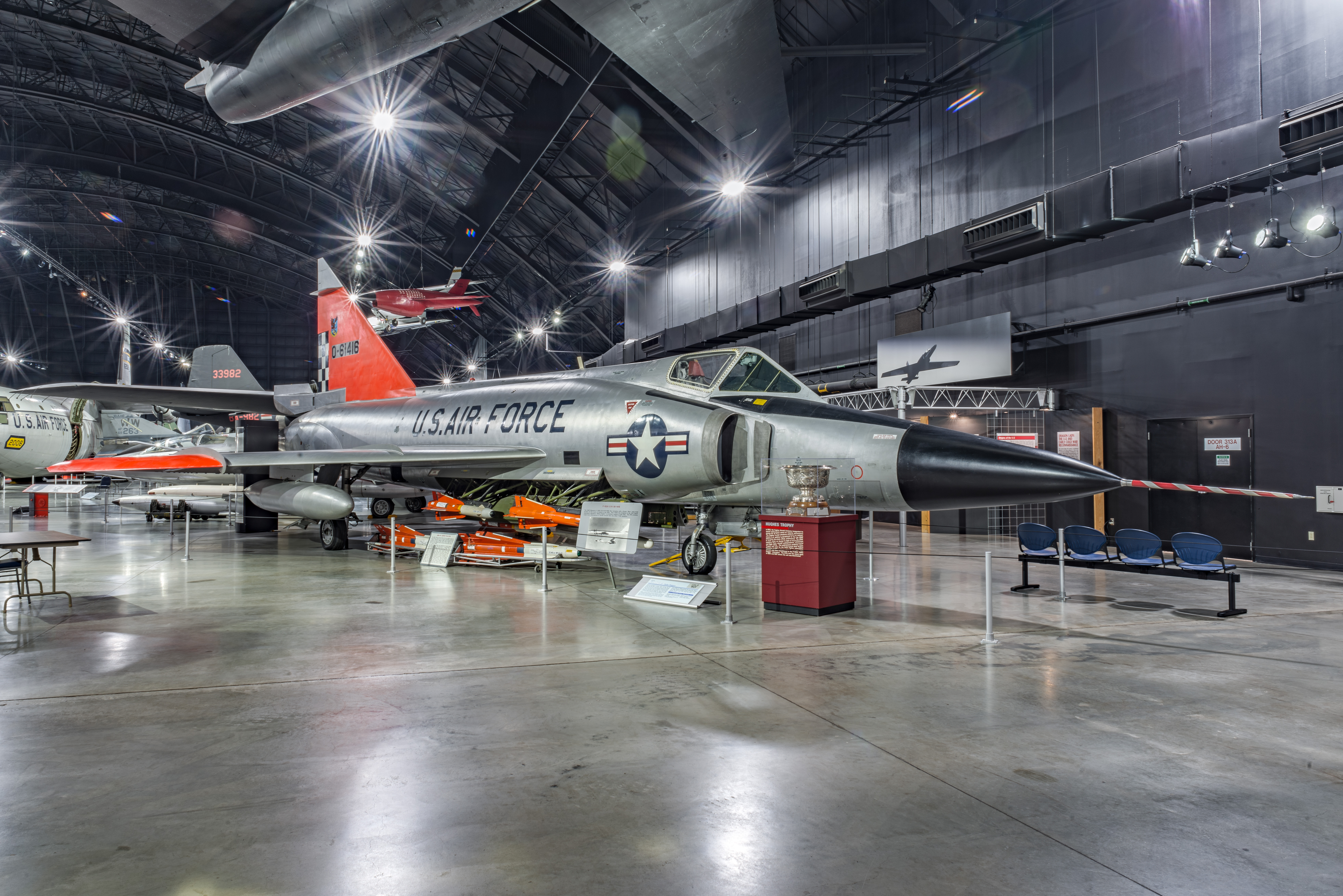
Convair F-102 Delta Dagger at the National Museum of the US Air Force.

- 56-1416 – National Museum of the United States Air Force, Wright-Patterson Air Force Base near Dayton, Ohio.
- 56-1427 – Travis AFB Heritage Center, Travis AFB, Fairfield, California.
- 56–1502, (painted as 55–3432), - North Dakota ANGB - 119TH FG, Fargo, North Dakota.
- 56-1505 – Minot AFB, Minot, North Dakota.
- 56-1515 – McChord Air Museum, McChord Air Force Base, Washington.
- 57-0788 – Long Island MacArthur Airport, Long Island, New York.
- 57–0817, (painted as 56–1357), - Jacksonville Air National Guard Base - 125th Fighter Wing, Florida Air National Guard, Jacksonville, Florida.
- 57-0826 – Sheppard AFB, Wichita Falls, Texas.<

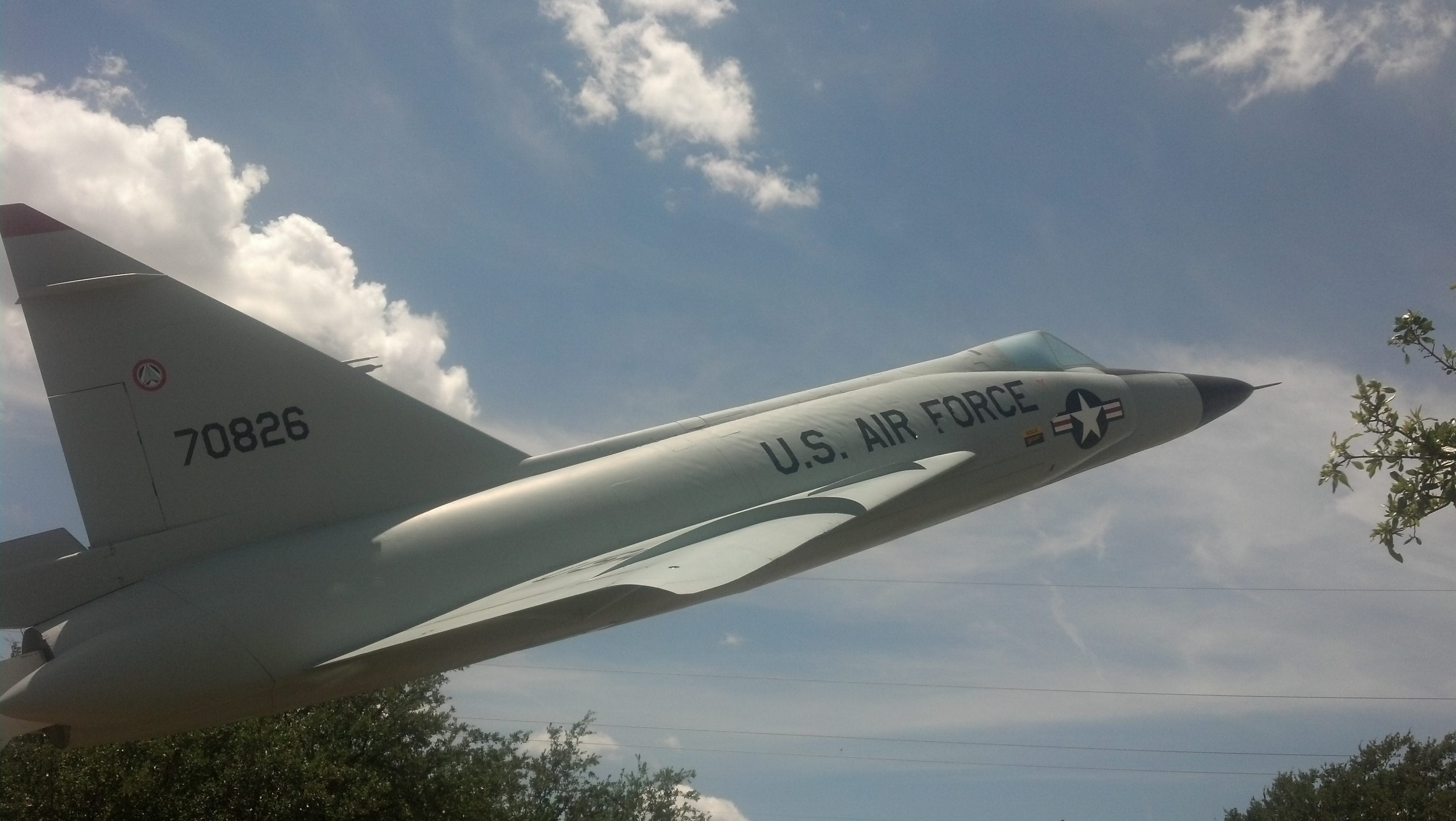
F-102 on display at Sheppard AFB.

- 57-0833 – Hill Aerospace Museum, Hill AFB, Utah.
- 57-0858 – Burlington Air National Guard Base, Burlington, Vermont.
- 57-0906 – Museum of Aviation, Robins AFB, Warner Robins, Georgia.

== Specifications (F-102A) ==
3-view line drawing of the Convair F-102 Delta Dagger

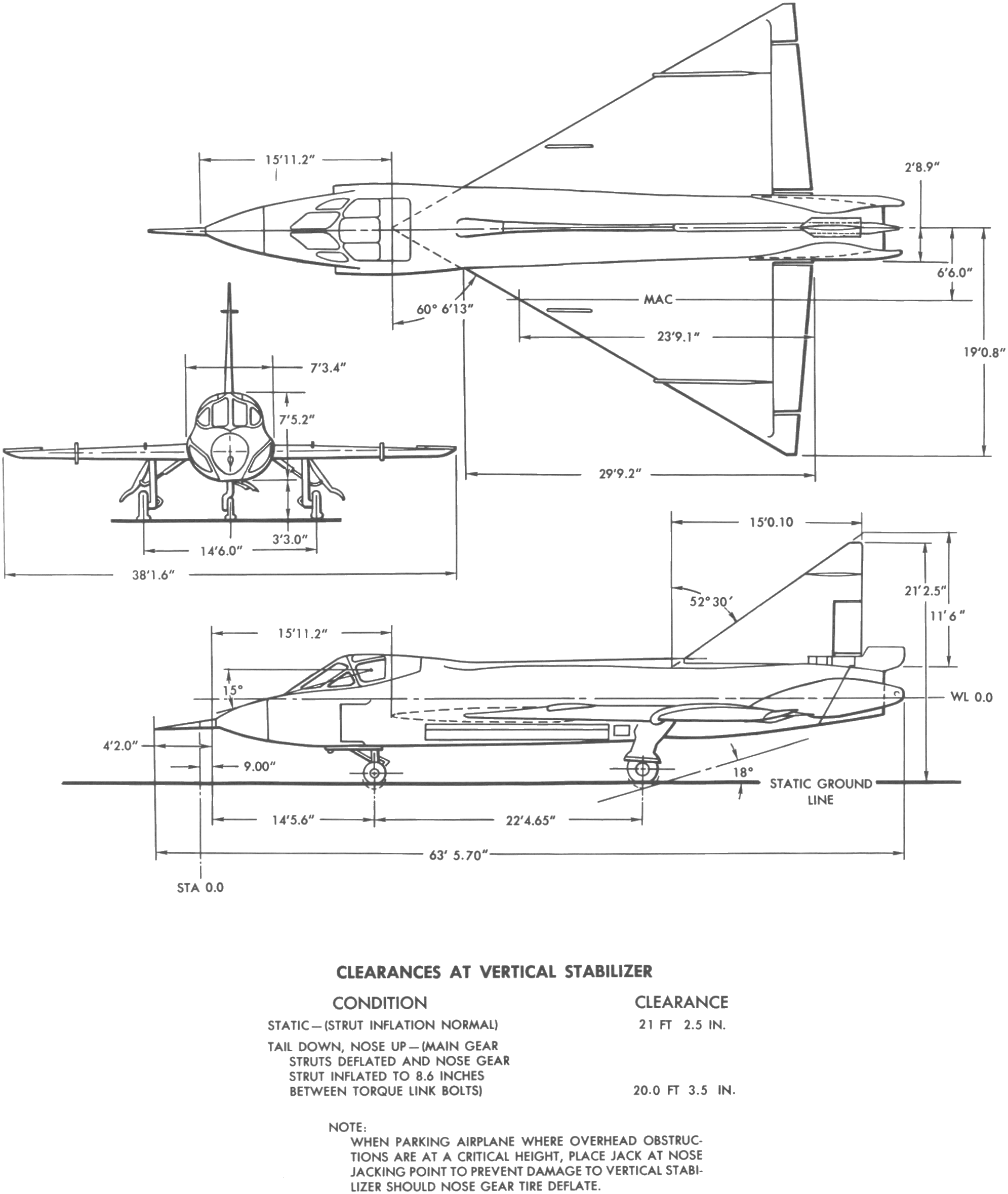
3-view line drawing of the Convair TF-102A Delta Dagger

Data from The Great Book of Fighters

General characteristics

- Crew: 1
- Length: 68 ft 4 in (20.83 m)
- Wingspan: 38 ft 1 in (11.61 m)
- Height: 21 ft 2.5 in (6.464 m)
- Wing area: 695 sq ft (64.6 m^{2}) conically cambered wing

661.5 sq ft (61.46 m^{2}) YF-102

- Airfoil: NACA 0004-65 mod
- Empty weight: 19,350 lb (8,777 kg)
- Gross weight: 24,494 lb (11,110 kg)
- Max takeoff weight: 31,500 lb (14,288 kg)
- Fuel capacity: 1,085 US gal (903 imp gal; 4,110 L) internal + 2 × 215 US gal (179 imp gal; 810 L) drop tanks
- Powerplant: 1 × Pratt & Whitney J57-P-25 afterburning turbojet engine, 11,700 lbf (52 kN) thrust dry, 17,000 lbf (76 kN) with afterburner

Performance

- Maximum speed: 825 mph (1,328 km/h, 717 kn) at 40,000 ft (12,192 m)
- Maximum speed: Mach 1.25, Mach 0.95 with drop tanks
- Range: 1,350 mi (2,170 km, 1,170 nmi)
- Service ceiling: 53,400 ft (16,300 m)
- Rate of climb: 13,000 ft/min (66 m/s)
- Wing loading: 35 lb/sq ft (170 kg/m^{2})
- Thrust/weight: 0.7

Armament

- Rockets: 24 × 2.75 in (70 mm) FFAR (Folding Fin Aerial Rocket) unguided rockets in missile bay doors
- Missiles: ** 6 × AIM-4 Falcon air-to-air missiles or
  - 3 × AIM-4 Falcon
  - 1 × AIM-26 Falcon with conventional or nuclear warhead

Avionics

- Hughes MG-10 fire control system

== See also ==
- Century Series

Related development

- Convair XF-92
- Convair F-106 Delta Dart

Aircraft of comparable role, configuration, and era

- Avro Canada CF-105 Arrow – (Canada)
- Dassault Mirage III – (France)
- English Electric Lightning – (United Kingdom)
- Mikoyan-Gurevich MiG-21 – (Soviet Union) / Chengdu J-7 – (China)
- Saab 35 Draken – (Sweden)
- Sukhoi Su-9 / Su-11 – (Soviet Union)
- Sukhoi Su-15 – (Soviet Union)

Related lists

- List of fighter aircraft
- List of military aircraft of the United States
