= SAGE radar stations =

The SAGE radar stations of Air Defense Command (Aerospace Defense Command after 1968) were the military installations operated by USAF squadrons using the first automated air defense environment (Semi-Automatic Ground Environment) and networked by the SAGE System, a computer network. Most of the radar stations used the Burroughs AN/FST-2 Coordinate Data Transmitting Set (CDTS) to automate the operator environment and provide radar tracks to sector command posts at SAGE Direction Centers (DCs), e.g., the Malmstrom Z-124 radar station was co-located with DC-20. The sector/division radar stations were networked by DCs and Manual Control Centers to provide command, control, and coordination (e.g., at Topsham AFS for the "Bangor North American Air Defense Sector") for ground-controlled interception of enemy aircraft by interceptors such as the F-106 developed to work with the SAGE System.

== Background ==
Post-World War II radar stations included those of the 1948 "five-station radar net" and the Lashup network completed in 1950, followed by the "Priority Permanent System" with the initial (priority) radar stations completed in 1952 as a "manual air defense system" with Manual ADCCs (e.g., using Plexiglas plotting boards as at the 1954 Ent Air Force Base command center for ADC.) Several Lashup stations became permanent stations (Camp Hero L-10 became LP-45, Fort Custis L-15/LP-56/P-56, Palermo L-13/LP-54, Sault Sainte Marie L-17/LP-20, Highlands L-12/LP-9) and in 1951 some new Permanent System stations similarly designated LP-2, LP-16, etc., instead of using newly deployed radars, were outfitted with older radars such as the January 1945 GE AN/CPS-5 radar, 1948 Western Electric AN/TPS-1B Radar, Bendix AN/TPS-1C radar. The MX-1353 and other programs developed the AN/FPS-6, AN/MPS-10, and other Cold War radars.

"At the end of 1957, ADC operated 182 radar stations…32 had been added during the last half of the year as low-altitude, unmanned gap-filler radars. The total consisted of 47 gap-filler stations, 75 Permanent System radars, 39 semimobile radars, 19 Pinetree stations,…1 Lashup[-era radar and a] single Texas Tower". SAGE System groundbreaking was at McChord Air Force Base for DC-12 in 1957 where the "electronic brain" began arriving in November 1958 for the Seattle Air Defense Sector, and the post-war Ground Observation Corps was disbanded in 1959.

== Description ==
Radar station personnel monitored systems (e.g., local radars and remote radars at gap-filler annexes) and at most radar stations, used CDTS equipment such as the antenna control unit and the Range Height Indicator—CDTS range precision was 1,300 ft (400 m). Also part of the SAGE Air Defense System were radar stations in sectors with Manual Control Centers which provided radar tracks by voice communication, and fourth floor consoles of SAGE Direction Centers in adjacent sectors could input those stations' tracks in the "Manual Inputs" room adjacent to the "Communication Recording-Monitoring and VHF" room. Squadrons at some radar stations were the parent organizations for detachments at other stations, e.g., the 666th RADSQ at Mill Valley Z-38 was the parent of Detachment 2 at the Mather AFB radar station, and the 771st RADSQ at Cape Charles Z-56 was responsible for three gap-filler annexes in Delaware, Virginia, and North Carolina.

Most radar stations were part of the preceding Permanent System and some SAGE stations had Ground Air Transmit Receive (GATR) equipment for radioing command guidance by TDDL automated data link to autopilots of equipped interceptors for vectoring to targets^{:160} (e.g., GATR site R-28 was at Palermo Z-54.) In addition to a squadron operations building (e.g., with CDTS), structures at the radar station included the radar pedestals (e.g., some CONUS stations such as Fort Heath used Arctic Towers), a squadron headquarters building, electrical generator and fuel storage structures, etc.

Notable remaining structures of SAGE radar stations include the radar tower at the Selfridge Military Air Museum, the Walker AFS quonset hut next to the Arctic Tower, the former SAGE barracks used for the McChord AFB museum, and the antenna tower, building, and Cold War era radar equipment which have survived nearly completely intact at the Saugatuck gap filler annex.

=== SAGE upgrades ===
Air Defense Command radar squadrons were renamed as personnel were assigned with training for the automated CDTS, e.g., the "609th Radar Squadron (SAGE)" was designated on September 1, 1958^{:154} (originally an AC&W Sq). The Air Defense Command reorganization when the SAGE System was deployed included the redesignation of Air Divisions to Air Defense Sectors in 1959, e.g., the 27th Air Division was renamed between February 1, 1959 and April 1, 1966, as the Los Angeles Air Defense Sector (LAADS) followed by the inactivation of units such as the Air Defense Forces (Western, Central, and Eastern, on July 1, 1960) and some Numbered Air Forces (e.g., Fourth Air Force, September 1, 1960). Radar station tracks were used for 1958 CIM-10 "BOMARC test firings at Patrick, Gunter, and McGuire", and a SAGE Radar Station was used for the first Bomarc intercept of a Cape Canaveral drone on August 7, 1958. A few SAGE radar stations provided radar tracks for use with the eight operational Bomarc complexes, e.g., for 28 Upper Peninsula launch shelters ("Kincheloe AFB BOMARC site"), 56 shelters in New Jersey (operational September 1, 1959), and 56 Long Island shelters (SAGE codename "BED") near the "FOX" mainland site.

Of the eight Permanent System stations that closed from 1959 to 1964 with squadrons relocating to stations with "RP" designations, two were the last remaining stations with the "LP" designation: (Elkhorn LP-31/RP-31F and Blue Knob LP-63). From 1959 to 1962, three NORAD radar stations were added for the SAGE Radar Network (i.e., after the third semi-mobile phase of the Permanent System): Key West Z-209, Richmond Z-210, Patrick Z-211 in 1962. One SAGE radar station also provided gap-filler radar coverage for Nike Hercules: San Pedro Hill Z-39 (RP-39) for the 1963–74 Integrated Fire Control area of Malibu Nike battery LA-78 on San Vicente Mtn.

A few Permanent System stations continued operations without being redesignated with Z-xx "NORAD identification codes", e.g., 1952 Duncanville P-79 until 1964, 1958 Cottonwood SM-150 until 1965, and 1948 Hamilton P-48 until 1973. In 1963 when NORAD/ADC command operations moved from Ent AFB to the nearby Chidlaw Building's Combined Operations Center with SAGE-automation, on July 31 the SAGE radar stations were redesignated with the Z-xx codes. Some sector assignments were redesignated (e.g., Watertown AFS was assigned from the 1958 Syracuse Air Defense Sector to the Boston Air Defense Sector on September 4, 1963) and by the end of 1963 nearly all of the Permanent System radar stations not used for SAGE had closed. In 1966, Chidlaw Building operations transferred to the Cheyenne Mountain nuclear bunker, SAGE's first BUIC II II CCCS was deployed (North Truro Z-10), and NORAD/ADC reorganized the Air Defense Sectors back to Air Divisions.

=== JUSS radar stations ===
The joint-use site system (JUSS) was completed after the 1959 Missile Master Plan resolved the surface-to-air missile (SAM) dispute: both the US Army and USAF SAMs would be deployed and their computers were integrated with each CCCS netting the USAF sector or Army region radar stations. The SAGE System used crosstelling of "SAGE reference track data" from the BOMARC AN/FSQ-7 to the NIKE Hercules AN/FSG-1's "two surveillance and entry consoles", and the nine bunker sites had been selected by June 1957 for coordinating Army batteries' intercept of targets within an interior NIKE Defense Area of the USAF sector. Deployment of JUSS resulted in several "LP" Permanent System stations closing, and the squadrons relocated to new JUSS "RP" radar stations at most of the nine sites where Army Missile Master bunkers were being constructed through December 14, 1960. Construction of the Highlands Army Air Defense Site for NY-55DC (fourth AN/FSQ-7) began adjacent to the 1948 Highlands P-9 to use the existing equipment as "Missile Master organic radars" and in 1961, the 770th Radar Squadron at Palermo LP-54 moved to the existing Ft Meade Nike AADCP (W-13DC with USAF RP-54 designation). Squadrons moving to new JUSS radar stations included the 635th RADSQ on May 15, 1960, to the first completed Missile Master bunker (Fort Lawton Air Force Station SE-90DC, January 21, 1960), and two JUSS installations used geographically separate radar stations and Missile Master bunkers: the new San Pedro Hill RP-39 was TBD miles from the Ft MacArthur bunker (completed December 1960), and the new Gibbsboro RP-63 in 1961 later provided 1966 radar tracks to replace the Nike radars at Pedricktown PH-64DC, 15 miles (24 km) away. As at San Pedro Hill (ARSR-tbd), the JUSS radar station at Fort Heath B-21DC (the third FSG-1 and second bunker completed—c. April 1960) also had a 1959 ARSR-1 radar of the FAA in addition to two USAF and two Army height finder radars.

=== Locations ===
Codes for Aerospace Defense Command radar stations in the United States

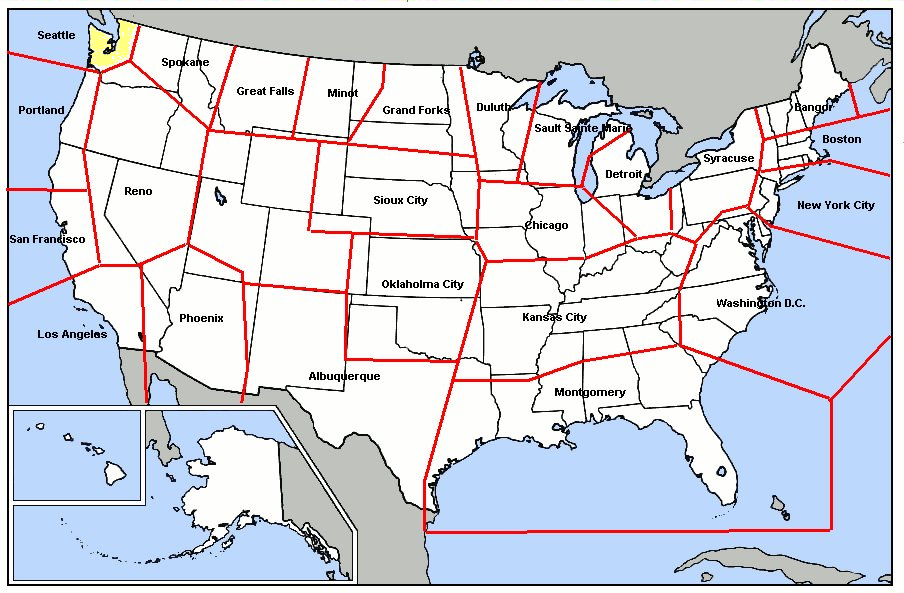
SAGE radar stations were grouped by Air Defense Sectors (Air Divisions after 1966). The SAGE System networked the radar stations in over 20 of the sectors using AN/FSQ-7 centrals in Direction Centers.

- LP-xx designates Permanent System stations using older radar equipment instead of radars deployed at "P-xx" stations
- P-xx designates "Priority Permanent System" stations completed by May 1952
- RP-xx designates a replacement of one of the permanent stations
- M-xx designates an initial a station of the 1953-7 semi-mobile radar program
- SM-xx designates a station of the 1954–62 "second phase mobile radar program"
- TM-xx designates a station of the 1957–60 "third phase mobile radar program"
- TT-x designates the Texas Towers, radar tower rigs off the East Coast.
- Z-xx is the NORAD identification code

Codes for Aerospace Defense Command radar stations outside the United States

- C-xx sites on the Canadian Pinetree Line assigned to ADC
- G-xx sites in Greenland established by Northeast Air Command (NEAC) reassigned to ADC, redesignated as C-xx sites.
- H-xx sites in Iceland established by Military Air Transport Service or NEAC reassigned to ADC.
- N-xx Pinetree Line sites in Canada transferred from NEAC to ADC in 1957, redesignated as C-xx sites.

Aerospace Defense Command general surveillance radar stations
Perm ID	SAGE ID	Location	ST	Coordinates	Squadron	Activated	Inactivated	Sector/Division (Group)
C-21		Saskatoon Mountain AS	AB	55°13′51″N 119°18′19″W	919th Aircraft Control and Warning Squadron	1953	1963	Spokane/25th
TM-196	Z-196; Z-249	Dauphin Island AFS	AL	30°15′01″N 088°04′42″W	693d Aircraft Control and Warning (later Radar) Squadron; 635th Radar Squadron; OL-G 630th Radar Squadron; OL-E 678th Air Defense Group	1959; 1972	1970; 1980 (J-12)	
TM-199	Z-199	Eufaula AFS	AL	31°52′53″N 085°15′13″W	609th Aircraft Control and Warning (later Radar) Squadron	1958	1968	
TM-197	Z-197	Thomasville AFS	AL	31°56′14″N 087°45′03″W	698th Aircraft Control and Warning (later Radar) Squadron	1958	1969	
M-91	Z-91	Texarkana AFS	AR	33°27′20″N 093°59′53″W	703d Aircraft Control and Warning Squadron	1955	1968	
SM-143		Walnut Ridge AFS	AR	36°07′48″N 090°55′09″W	725th Aircraft Control and Warning (later Radar) Squadron	1956	1963	
TM-181	Z-181	Ajo AFS	AZ	32°25′52″N 112°56′42″W	612th Aircraft Control and Warning (later Radar) Squadron	1958	1969	
M-128		Kingman AFS	AZ	35°11′51″N 114°02′29″W	659th Aircraft Control and Warning Squadron	1955	1958	
M-92	Z-92	Mount Lemmon AFS	AZ	32°26′30″N 110°47′22″W	684th Aircraft Control and Warning (later Radar) Squadron	1956	1969	
SM-162		Vincent AFB	AZ	32°39′15″N 114°35′28″W	864th Aircraft Control and Warning Squadron	1955	1963	
M-93		Winslow AFS	AZ	35°04′49″N 110°50′01″W	904th Aircraft Control and Warning (later Radar) Squadron	1955	1963	
C-20		Baldy Hughes AS	BC	55°36′46″N 122°57′16″W	918th Aircraft Control and Warning Squadron	1955	1963	
C-153		Kamloops AS	BC	50°48′08″N 120°07′36″W	825th Aircraft Control and Warning Squadron	1958	1962	
C-19		Puntzi Mountain AS	BC	52°09′41″N 124°12′22″W	917th Aircraft Control and Warning Squadron	1952	1962	
M-96	Z-96	Almaden AFS	CA	37°09′34″N 121°54′01″W	682d Aircraft Control and Warning (later Radar) Squadron	1957	1980	
P-59	Z-59	Boron AFS	CA	35°04′44″N 117°34′45″W	750th Aircraft Control and Warning (later Radar) Squadron	1952	1975	
P-2	Z-2	Cambria AFS	CA	35°31′20″N 121°03′49″W	775th Aircraft Control and Warning (later Radar) Squadron	1951	1980	
P-48		Hamilton AFB	CA	38°03′16″N 122°30′56″W	724th Aircraft Control and Warning Squadron	1946	1973	San Francisco/28th
P-33	Z-33	Klamath AFS	CA	41°33′33″N 124°05′10″W	777th Aircraft Control and Warning (later Radar) Squadron	1951	1981	
RP-15	Z-15	Lompoc AFS	CA	34°33′57″N 120°30′01″W	669th Radar Squadron	1963	1968	
P-74	Z-74	Madera AFS	CA	37°02′07″N 120°01′59″W	774th Aircraft Control and Warning (later Radar) Squadron	1951	1966	
P-58		Mather AFB	CA	38°33′13″N 121°16′08″W	668th AC&W Sq until 1961, later 666th Radar Squadron (Det 2)	1951	1966	
P-38	Z-38	Mill Valley AFS	CA	37°55′26″N 122°35′49″W	666th Aircraft Control and Warning (later Radar) Squadron	1951	1980 (J-33)	San Francisco/28th
P-76	Z-76	Mount Laguna AFS	CA	32°52′36″N 116°24′54″W	751st Aircraft Control and Warning (later Radar) Squadron	1952	1981	Los Angeles/27th (751st)
P-37	Z-37	Point Arena AFS	CA	38°53′23″N 123°33′01″W	776th Aircraft Control and Warning (later Radar) Squadron	1951	1998 (J-34)	
SM-157	Z-157	Red Bluff AFS	CA	40°08′46″N 122°18′16″W	859th Aircraft Control and Warning (later Radar) Squadron	1956	1970	
P-39		San Clemente Island AFS	CA	32°58′37″N 118°33′10″W	670th Aircraft Control and Warning Squadron	1951	1960	
RP-39	Z-39	San Pedro Hill AFS	CA	33°44′45″N 118°20′10″W	670th Radar Squadron	1961	1997 (J-31)	Los Angeles
P-15		Santa Rosa Island AFS	CA	33°56′39″N 120°07′07″W	669th Aircraft Control and Warning Squadron	1952	1963	
TM-200	Z-200	Cross City AFS	FL	29°38′10″N 083°05′55″W	691st Aircraft Control and Warning (later Radar) Squadron	1958	1970	Montgomery
M-114	Z-114	Jacksonville NAS	FL	30°13′17″N 081°40′57″W	679th Aircraft Control and Warning (later Radar) Squadron	1957	1981	Montgomery
	Z-209	Key West NAS	FL	24°35′05″N 081°41′18″W	671st Aircraft Control and Warning (later Radar) Squadron	1962	1988	Montgomery
M-129	Z-129	MacDill AFB	FL	27°50′05″N 082°28′19″W	660th Aircraft Control and Warning (later Radar) Squadron	1954	1980	Montgomery
	Z-211	Patrick AFB	FL	28°12′50″N 080°35′57″W	645th Radar Squadron	1961	1988	Montgomery
	Z-210	Richmond AFS	FL	25°37′24″N 080°24′16″W	644th Aircraft Control and Warning Squadron	1959	1988	Montgomery
TM-198	Z-198	Tyndall AFB	FL	30°04′35″N 085°36′35″W	678th Aircraft Control and Warning (later Radar) Squadron	1956	1983	Montgomery (678th)
		Thorshavn AS	FO	62°04′05″N 006°57′59″W	932d Air Control Squadron	1992	2006	
M-87		Dobbins AFB	GA	33°55′06″N 084°30′16″W	908th Aircraft Control and Warning Squadron	1951	1958	
M-111	Z-111	Marietta AFS	GA	33°54′14″N 084°29′12″W	908th Aircraft Control and Warning (later Radar) Squadron	1956	1968	Montgomery/35th
M-112	Z-112	Hunter AFB	GA	32°01′01″N 081°09′57″W	702d Aircraft Control and Warning (later Radar) Squadron	1955	1979	
SM-165		Flintstone AFS	GA	34°57′25″N 085°22′55″W	867th Aircraft Control and Warning Squadron	1955	1960	
G-32		Thule AS	GL	76°24′14″N 068°43′06″W	931st Aircraft Control and Warning Squadron	1952	1965	
G-33		Thule AS	GL	78°18′50″N 072°36′35″W	931st Aircraft Control and Warning Squadron (Det 1)	1952	1965	
G-34		Thule AS	GL	79°27′52″N 059°09′01″W	931st Aircraft Control and Warning Squadron (Det 2)	1952	1965	
M-122		Dallas Center AFS	IA	41°43′02″N 093°54′19″W	650th Aircraft Control and Warning Squadron	1955	1957	Sioux City/30th
P-83	Z-83	Waverly AFS	IA	42°41′24″N 092°29′04″W	788th Aircraft Control and Warning (later Radar) Squadron	1951	1969	Sioux City/30th
SM-150		Cottonwood AFS	ID	46°04′01″N 116°27′51″W	822d Aircraft Control and Warning (later Radar) Squadron	1958	1965	
RP-31	Z-31	Arlington Heights AFS	IL	42°03′51″N 087°59′44″W	755th Aircraft Control and Warning (later Radar) Squadron	1960	1969	Chicago
P-70	Z-70	Belleville AFS	IL	38°28′32″N 089°54′21″W	798th Aircraft Control and Warning (Later Radar) Squadron	1951	1968	Chicago
SM-137		Carmi AFS	IL	38°05′40″N 088°07′01″W	704th Aircraft Control and Warning Squadron	1955	1957	
P-85	Z-85	Hanna City AFS	IL	40°41′56″N 089°49′33″W	791st Aircraft Control and Warning (later Radar) Squadron	1951	1968	
P-53	Z-53	Rockville AFS	IN	39°46′31″N 087°15′24″W	782d Aircraft Control and Warning (later Radar) Squadron	1951	1966	
H-3		Hofn AS	IS	64°14′28″N 014°57′43″W	933d AC&W; 667th AC&W (1960), Air Defense, & Air Control squadrons	1951	1992	
H-1A		Keflavik AS	IS	64°01′18″N 022°39′21″W	932d Air Control Squadron	1992	2006	
		NAS Keflavik	IS	63°57′42″N 022°35′30″W	932d Air Control Squadron	1992	2006	
H-2		Langanes AS	IS	66°16′44″N 014°59′37″W	667th Aircraft Control and Warning (later Air Control) Squadron	1952	1960	
H-2A		Langanes AS	IS	66°08′39″N 015°05′18″W	667th Aircraft Control and Warning (later Air Control) Squadron	1992	2006	
H-4A		Latrar AS	IS	66°10′41″N 023°19′41″W	934th Air Control Squadron	1992	2006	
H-1		Rockville AS	IS	64°02′07″N 022°39′16″W	932d AC&W, Air Defense, & Air Control squadrons	1951	1992	
H-4		Straumnes AS	IS	66°25′49″N 023°05′34″W	934th AC&W, Air Defense, & Air Control squadrons	1951	1992	
P-47	Z-47	Hutchinson AFS	KS	37°55′34″N 097°53′13″W	793d Aircraft Control and Warning (later Radar) Squadron	1951	1968	
P-72	Z-72	Olathe AFS	KS	38°50′06″N 094°54′16″W	738th Aircraft Control and Warning (later Radar) Squadron	1951	1968	
M-131		Owingsville AFS	KY	38°11′31″N 083°49′01″W	809th Aircraft Control and Warning Squadron	1954	1957	
P-82	Z-82	Snow Mountain AFS	KY	37°53′50″N 086°00′00″W	784th Aircraft Control and Warning (later Radar) Squadron	1951	1968	
M-125		England AFB	LA	31°18′52″N 092°31′50″W	653d Aircraft Control and Warning Squadron	1954	1963	
M-126	Z-126	Houma AFS	LA	29°33′45″N 090°40′30″W	657th Aircraft Control and Warning (later Radar) Squadron	1953	1970	
TM-194	Z-248	Lake Charles AFS	LA	30°11′03″N 093°10′33″W	812th AC&W Sq, 630th RADSQ OL-F, 634th RADSQ, 678th ADG OL-D	1958	1995	
MM-1		Fort Heath	MA	42°23′20″N 070°58′10″W	820th Radar Squadron (AC&W Sq 1961–2)	1959	1962	
P-10	Z-10	North Truro AFS	MA	42°02′03″N 070°03′15″W	762d Aircraft Control and Warning (later Radar) Squadron	1951	1995	(762d)
C-17		Beausejour AS	MB	50°08′53″N 096°13′24″W	916th Aircraft Control and Warning Squadron	1953	1961	
SM-171		Andrews AFB	MD	38°48′25″N 076°52′56″W		1955	1960	Washington/85th
RP-54	Z-227	Ft Meade	MD	39°06′59″N 076°43′39″W	770th Radar Squadron	1961	1979	Washington
P-13	Z-13	Brunswick AFS	ME	43°53′44″N 069°55′24″W	654th Aircraft Control and Warning (later Radar) Squadron	1951	1965	Bangor/36th
M-110	Z-110	Bucks Harbor AFS	ME		907th Aircraft Control and Warning (later Radar) Squadron	1956	1988	Bangor/36th
P-80	Z-80	Caswell AFS	ME		766th Aircraft Control and Warning (later Radar) Squadron	1952	1979	Bangor/36th
P-65	Z-65	Charleston AFS	ME	45°05′30″N 069°05′42″W	765th Aircraft Control and Warning (later Radar) Squadron	1952	1979	Bangor/36th (765th)
M-105		Alpena AFS	MI	45°05′10″N 083°34′25″W	677th Aircraft Control and Warning Squadron	1954	1957	
P-16	Z-16	Calumet AFS	MI	47°22′16″N 088°10′14″W	665th Aircraft Control and Warning (later Radar) Squadron	1951	1988	Duluth/29th (665th)
P-67	Z-67	Custer AFS	MI	42°20′32″N 085°16′49″W	781st Aircraft Control and Warning (later Radar) Squadron	1951	1969	
P-34	Z-34	Empire AFS	MI	44°48′09″N 086°03′11″W	752d Aircraft Control and Warning (later Radar) Squadron	1951	1978	
M-109		Grand Marais AFS	MI	46°39′49″N 085°59′03″W	906th Aircraft Control and Warning Squadron	1954	1957	
P-61	Z-61	Port Austin AFS	MI	44°01′49″N 083°00′06″W	754th Aircraft Control and Warning (later Radar) Squadron	1951	1988	
P-66	Z-66	Sault Ste. Marie AFS	MI	46°27′26″N 084°23′14″W	753d Aircraft Control and Warning (later Radar) Squadron	1952	1979	
P-20	Z-20	Selfridge AFB	MI	42°37′40″N 082°49′48″W	661st Aircraft Control and Warning (later Radar) Squadron	1951	1974	
P-23		Willow Run AFS	MI	42°14′33″N 083°29′59″W	704th Aircraft Control and Warning Squadron	1955	1960	tbd/30th
SM-132	Z-132	Baudette AFS	MN	48°40′12″N 094°37′07″W	692d Aircraft Control and Warning (later Radar) Squadron	1958	1979	(692d)
P-18	Z-18	Chandler AFS	MN	43°53′50″N 095°56′45″W	787th Aircraft Control and Warning (later Radar) Squadron	1951	1969	Duluth/23rd
P-69	Z-69	Finland AFS	MN	47°27′13″N 091°14′15″W	756th Aircraft Control and Warning (later Radar) Squadron	1951	1984	
SM-138		Grand Rapids AFS	MN	47°14′25″N 093°30′54″W	707th Aircraft Control and Warning (later Radar) Squadron	1956	1963	
M-101		Rochester AFS	MN	44°04′11″N 092°20′24″W	808th Aircraft Control and Warning Squadron	1955	1957	
P-36		Snelling AFS	MN	44°52′14″N 093°12′36″W	673rd Aircraft Control and Warning Squadron	1955	1961	tbd/31st
P-17	Z-17	Wadena AFS	MN	46°30′55″N 095°06′46″W	739th Aircraft Control and Warning (later Radar) Squadron	1953	1970	
SM-139		Willmar AFS	MN	45°08′19″N 095°04′25″W	721st Aircraft Control and Warning (later Radar) Squadron	1956	1961	
P-68		Fordland AFS	MO	37°09′15″N 092°52′33″W	797th Aircraft Control and Warning Squadron	1951	1961	
SM-169		Grandview AFB	MO	38°50′41″N 094°32′47″W	31st Air Division	1955	1961	
P-64	Z-64	Kirksville AFS	MO	40°17′52″N 092°34′32″W	790th Aircraft Control and Warning (later Radar) Squadron	1951	1968	
TM-195	Z-195	Crystal Springs AFS	MS	31°58′45″N 090°20′40″W	627th Aircraft Control and Warning (later Radar) Squadron	1958	1968	
P-24	Z-24	Cut Bank AFS	MT	48°56′32″N 112°48′21″W	681st Aircraft Control and Warning (later Radar) Squadron	1951	1965	Great Falls
P-25	Z-25	Havre AFS	MT	48°52′51″N 109°56′42″W	778th Aircraft Control and Warning (later Radar) Squadron	1951	1979	Great Falls (778th)
TM-179	Z-179	Kalispell AFS	MT	48°00′41″N 114°21′53″W	716th Aircraft Control and Warning (later Radar) Squadron	1959	1978	Great Falls
TM-178	Z-178	Lewistown AFS	MT	47°13′03″N 109°13′19″W	694th Aircraft Control and Warning (later Radar) Squadron	1958	1971	Great Falls
SM-147	Z-147	Malmstrom AFB	MT	47°30′06″N 111°12′12″W	801st Aircraft Control and Warning (later Radar) Squadron	1956–1969	1969-1974	Great Falls
M-98	Z-98	Miles City AFS	MT	46°17′49″N 105°58′42″W	902d Aircraft Control and Warning (later Radar) Squadron	1954	1968	Great Falls
P-26	Z-26	Opheim AFS	MT	48°51′40″N 106°28′40″W	779th Aircraft Control and Warning (later Radar) Squadron	1951	1979	Great Falls
P-11		Yaak AFS	MT	48°51′44″N 115°43′18″W	680th Aircraft Control and Warning Squadron	1951	1960	Great Falls
M-116		Cherry Point MCAS	NC	34°54′10″N 076°53′10″W	614th Aircraft Control and Warning (later Radar) Squadron	1957	1963	
M-115	Z-115	Fort Fisher AFS	NC	33°59′24″N 077°55′06″W	701st Aircraft Control and Warning (later Radar) Squadron	1955	1997	(701st)
M-117	Z-117	Roanoke Rapids AFS	NC	36°26′23″N 077°43′31″W	632d Aircraft Control and Warning (later Radar) Squadron	1956	1978	
M-130	Z-130	Winston-Salem AFS	NC	36°02′30″N 080°08′18″W	810th Aircraft Control and Warning (later Radar) Squadron	1956	1970	
TM-177 TM-177B	Z-177 n/a	Dickinson AFS; Alexander	ND	46°55′14″N 102°43′56″W	706th Aircraft Control and Warning (later Radar) Squadron	1958; 1960	1965; 1967	
P-29	Z-29	Finley AFS	ND	47°30′57″N 097°52′07″W	785th Aircraft Control and Warning (later Radar) Squadron	1951	1979	
P-27	Z-27	Fortuna AFS	ND	48°54′14″N 103°52′00″W	780th Aircraft Control and Warning (later Radar) Squadron	1951	1984	(780th)
P-28; P-28A; P-28D	Z-28	Minot AFS; Niobe; Regan	ND	48°00′13″N 101°17′40″W	786th Aircraft Control and Warning (later Radar) Squadron	1952-04; 1957-10; 1959-01	1979-07-01; 1968-06; 1968-06	
SM-133	Z-133	Hastings AFS	NE	40°34′48″N 098°17′24″W	625th Radar Squadron	1962	1968	Sioux City/30th
P-71	Z-71	Omaha AFS	NE	41°21′39″N 096°01′28″W	789th Aircraft Control and Warning (later Radar) Squadron	1951	1968	Kansas City|30th
M-104		Rye AFS	NH	43°02′41″N 070°42′51″W	644th Aircraft Control and Warning Squadron	1956	1957	
P-9	Z-9	Highlands AFS	NJ	40°23′29″N 073°59′38″W	646th Aircraft Control and Warning (later Radar) Squadron	1948	1966	New York/21st
RP-63	Z-63	Gibbsboro AFS	NJ	39°49′27″N 074°57′16″W	772d Radar Squadron	1961	1994	New York/21st
P-54	Z-54	Palermo AFS	NJ	39°13′19″N 074°41′14″W	770th Aircraft Control and Warning Squadron, 680th Radar Squadron	1951	1970	New York/21st
N-27		Cartwright AS	NL	53°43′28″N 056°57′51″W	922d Aircraft Control and Warning Squadron	1953	1968	
N-28		Hopedale AS	NL	55°27′59″N 060°13′47″W	923d Aircraft Control and Warning Squadron	1953	1957	
N-24		Melville AS	NL	53°17′45″N 060°32′24″W	641st Aircraft Control and Warning Squadron	1953	1971	
N-22		Red Cliff AS	NL	47°38′20″N 052°40′02″W	642d Aircraft Control and Warning Squadron	1953	1961	
N-26		Saint Anthony AS	NL	51°20′59″N 055°36′29″W	921st Aircraft Control and Warning Squadron	1953	1968	
N-23		Stephenville Air Station	NL	48°35′21″N 058°39′51″W	640th Aircraft Control and Warning Squadron	1953	1971	
N-29		Saglek AS	NL	58°29′19″N 062°35′08″W	924th Aircraft Control and Warning Squadron	1953	1970	
P-7		Continental Divide AFS	NM	35°23′21″N 108°21′12″W	769th Aircraft Control and Warning Squadron	1951	1961	
P-41		Kirtland AFB	NM	35°03′12″N 106°35′15″W	690th Aircraft Control and Warning Squadron	1954	1962	Albuquerque/34th
M-95		Las Cruces AFS	NM	32°15′34″N 106°58′36″W	685th Aircraft Control and Warning Squadron	1954	1963	
P-51		Moriarty AFS	NM	35°01′50″N 105°49′00″W	768th Aircraft Control and Warning Squadron	1951	1961	
P-8		Tierra Amarilla AFS	NM	36°37′24″N 106°39′50″W	767th Aircraft Control and Warning Squadron	1951	1959	
M-90		Walker AFB	NM	33°18′34″N 104°32′54″W	686th Aircraft Control and Warning Squadron	1953	1963	
M-94	Z-94	West Mesa AFS	NM	35°04′19″N 106°52′12″W	687th Aircraft Control and Warning Squadron	1956	1968	
C-102		Barrington AS	NS	43°27′08″N 065°28′17″W	672d Aircraft Control and Warning Squadron	1956	1962	
N-31		Frobisher Bay AB	NT	63°46′50″N 068°32′38″W	926th Aircraft Control and Warning Squadron	1953	1961	
N-30		Resolution Island AS	NT	61°35′47″N 064°38′18″W	920th Aircraft Control and Warning Squadron	1951	1961	
SM-156	Z-156	Fallon AFS	NV	39°24′19″N 118°43′19″W	858th Aircraft Control and Warning (later Radar) Squadron	1956	1975	Reno (858th)
SM-163	Z-163	Las Vegas AFS	NV	36°19′07″N 115°34′31″W	865th Aircraft Control and Warning (later Radar) Squadron	1956	1969	
SM-164	Z-164	Tonopah AFS	NV	38°03′06″N 117°13′32″W	866th Aircraft Control and Warning (later Radar) Squadron	1956	1970 (to FAA)	Reno (858th)
M-127	Z-127	Winnemucca AFS	NV	41°00′40″N 117°46′03″W	658th Aircraft Control and Warning (later Radar) Squadron	1956	1968	
P-21	Z-21	Lockport AFS	NY	43°08′25″N 078°50′05″W	763d Aircraft Control and Warning (later Radar) Squadron	1951	1979	Syracuse
P-45	Z-45	Montauk AFS	NY	41°03′46″N 071°52′23″W	773d Aircraft Control and Warning (later Radar) Squadron	1948	1981	
P-3		Roslyn AFS	NY	40°47′47″N 073°37′37″W	645th Aircraft Control and Warning Squadron	1951	1958	New York/26th
P-50	Z-50	Saratoga Springs AFS	NY	43°00′41″N 073°40′57″W	656th Aircraft Control and Warning (later Radar) Squadron	1951	1977	
P-49	Z-49	Watertown AFS	NY	43°55′31″N 075°54′33″W	655th Aircraft Control and Warning (later Radar) Squadron	1951	1979	Syracuse
P-73	Z-73	Bellefontaine AFS	OH	40°22′20″N 083°43′10″W	664th Aircraft Control and Warning (later Radar) Squadron	1951-04	1969	
SM-170		Wright-Patterson AFB	OH	39°47′39″N 084°03′20″W	58th Air Division	1955	1958	
P-77		Bartlesville AFS	OK	36°45′44″N 096°02′18″W	796th Aircraft Control and Warning Squadron	1951	1961	
P-52	Z-52	Oklahoma City AFS	OK	35°24′12″N 097°21′28″W	746th Aircraft Control and Warning (later Radar) Squadron	1951	1969	Oklahoma City/31st
P-62		Brookfield AFS	OH	41°13′09″N 080°33′43″W	662d Aircraft Control and Warning Squadron	1951	1959	
C-15		Armstrong AS	ON	50°18′19″N 089°00′49″W	914th Aircraft Control and Warning Squadron	1952	1962	
C-119		Lowther AS	ON	49°33′21″N 082°59′31″W	639th Aircraft Control and Warning Squadron	1956	1963	
C-14		Pagwa AS	ON	50°01′04″N 085°15′06″W	913th Aircraft Control and Warning Squadron	1952	1963	
C-10		Ramore AS	ON	48°25′37″N 080°14′30″W	912th Aircraft Control and Warning Squadron	1952	1962	
C-16		Sioux Lookout AS	ON	50°04′59″N 092°00′08″W	915th Aircraft Control and Warning Squadron	1952	1962	
SM-149	Z-149	Baker AFS	OR	44°35′11″N 117°47′14″W	821st Aircraft Control and Warning (later Radar) Squadron	1959	1968	
M-118	Z-118	Burns AFS	OR	43°33′45″N 119°09′05″W	634th Aircraft Control and Warning (later Radar) Squadron	1955	1970	
P-32	Z-32	Condon AFS	OR	45°14′12″N 120°18′06″W	636th Aircraft Control and Warning (later Radar) Squadron	1951	1970	
TM-180	Z-180	Keno AFS	OR	42°04′08″N 121°58′20″W	827th Aircraft Control and Warning (later Radar) Squadron	1957	1979	(827th)
M-100	Z-100	Mount Hebo AFS	OR	45°12′57″N 123°45′28″W	689th Aircraft Control and Warning (later Radar) Squadron	1957	1979	
P-12	Z-12	North Bend AFS	OR	43°32′00″N 124°10′35″W	761st Aircraft Control and Warning (later Radar) Squadron	1951	1980	
P-30	Z-30	Benton AFS	PA	41°21′30″N 076°17′40″W	648th Aircraft Control and Warning (later Radar) Squadron	1951	1975	
P-63		Claysburg AFS	PA	40°17′15″N 078°33′50″W	772d Aircraft Control and Warning (later Radar) Squadron	1951	1961	
RP-62	Z-62	Oakdale AFS	PA	40°23′50″N 080°09′40″W	662d Aircraft Control and Warning (later Radar) Squadron	1959	1969	
SM-159	Z-159	Aiken AFS	SC	33°38′46″N 081°40′36″W	861st Aircraft Control and Warning (later Radar) Squadron	1955	1975	
M-113	Z-113	North Charleston AFS	SC	32°53′44″N 080°01′20″W	792d Aircraft Control and Warning (later Radar) Squadron	1955	1980	
M-97		Ellsworth AFB	SD	44°09′16″N 103°05′03″W	740th Aircraft Control and Warning Squadron	1953	1962	
M-99	Z-99	Gettysburg AFS	SD	45°02′59″N 099°57′22″W	903d Aircraft Control and Warning (later Radar) Squadron	1956	1968	
SM-134	Z-134	Pickstown AFS	SD	43°04′59″N 098°28′31″W	695th Radar Squadron	1961	1968	
P-42		Lake City AFS	TN	36°11′54″N 084°13′50″W	663d Aircraft Control and Warning Squadron	1952	1961	
SM-145		Joelton AFS	TN	36°20′12″N 086°51′40″W	799th Aircraft Control and Warning Squadron	1956	1961	
M-88	Z-88	Amarillo AFB	TX	35°14′46″N 101°39′25″W	688th Aircraft Control and Warning Squadron	1954	1968	
P-78		Duncanville AFS	TX	32°38′55″N 096°54′25″W	745th Aircraft Control and Warning Squadron	1952	1964	
TM-188		Eagle Pass AFS	TX	28°51′36″N 100°31′37″W	733d Aircraft Control and Warning Squadron	1957	1963	
P-79	Z-79; Z-240	Ellington AFB	TX	29°36′56″N 095°10′23″W	747th Aircraft Control and Warning Squadron; OL-C 630th Radar Squadron	1952	1979	
TM-192		Killeen AFS	TX	31°03′04″N 097°51′45″W	814th Aircraft Control and Warning Squadron	1957	1961	
P-75	Z-75; Z-241	Lackland AFB	TX	29°23′17″N 098°37′59″W	741st Aircraft Control and Warning Squadron; OL-D 630th Radar Squadron	1953; 1972	1969; 1976	
TM-193		Lufkin AFS	TX	31°25′17″N 094°48′10″W	815th Aircraft Control and Warning Squadron	1957	1961	
TM-187		Ozona AFS	TX	30°42′15″N 101°07′00″W	732d Aircraft Control and Warning Squadron	1951	1963	
RP-78	Z-78	Perrin AFS	TX	33°42′17″N 096°38′54″W	745th Aircraft Control and Warning Squadron	1964	1969	
TM-190		Port Isabel AFS	TX	26°09′20″N 097°20′16″W	811th Aircraft Control and Warning Squadron	1958	1961	
TM-186		Pyote AFS	TX	31°28′40″N 103°10′06″W	697th Aircraft Control and Warning Squadron	1958	1963	
TM-192		Rockport AFS	TX	28°05′30″N 097°02′45″W	813th Aircraft Control and Warning Squadron	1958	1963	
M-89	Z-89	Sweetwater AFS	TX	32°27′48″N 100°28′24″W	683d Aircraft Control and Warning Squadron	1956	1969	
TM-189		Zapata AFS	TX	26°57′08″N 099°16′31″W	742d Aircraft Control and Warning Squadron	1957	1961	
M-121	Z-121	Bedford AFS	VA	37°31′02″N 079°30′37″W	649th Aircraft Control and Warning (later Radar) Squadron	1954	1975	
P-56 P-56A; P-56B; P-56C	Z-56 Z-56A; Z-56B; Z-56C	Cape Charles AFS Temperanceville; Bethany Beach; Elizabeth City	VA VA; DE; NC	37°07′58″N 075°57′11″W 37°51′38″N 075°33′28″W; 38°31′35″N 075°06′26″W; 36°14′46″N 076°15′20″W	771st Aircraft Control and Warning (later Radar) Squadron	1951	1981	
RP-55	Z-55	Manassas AFS	VA	38°37′40″N 077°26′18″W	647th Aircraft Control and Warning (later Radar) Squadron	1955	1965	Washington
M-103		Lyndonville AFS	VT	44°39′55″N 071°46′16″W	911th Aircraft Control and Warning (later Radar) Squadron	1956	1963	
P-14	Z-14	Saint Albans AFS	VT	44°46′54″N 073°03′56″W	764th Aircraft Control and Warning (later Radar) Squadron	1951	1979	
P-46	Z-46	Blaine AFS	WA	48°54′51″N 122°43′56″W	757th Aircraft Control and Warning (later Radar) Squadron	1951	1979	
P-60		Colville AFS	WA	48°35′27″N 117°35′19″W	760th Aircraft Control and Warning (later Radar) Squadron	1951	1961	
P-6		Curlew AFS	WA	48°52′38″N 118°47′08″W	638th Aircraft Control and Warning Squadron	1951	1959	
RP-1		Fort Lawton AFS	WA	47°39′27″N 122°24′47″W	635th Aircraft Control and Warning (later Radar) Squadron	1960	1963	
SM-172		Geiger Field	WA	47°37′23″N 117°30′52″W		1954	1958	Spokane/9th
L-29		Larson AFB	WA	47°12′28″N 119°19′13″W	637th Aircraft Control and Warning Squadron	1950	1952-->	
P-44	Z-44	Makah AFS	WA	48°22′18″N 124°40′30″W	758th Aircraft Control and Warning (later Radar) Squadron	1951	1982	
P-1		McChord AFB	WA	47°07′25″N 122°29′32″W	635th Aircraft Control and Warning Squadron	1951	1960	Seattle/25th
SM-151	Z-151	Mica Peak AFS	WA	47°34′26″N 117°04′52″W	823d Aircraft Control and Warning (later Radar) Squadron	1956	1975	
P-57	Z-57	Naselle AFS	WA	46°25′19″N 123°47′53″W	759th Aircraft Control and Warning (later Radar) Squadron	1951	1966	
P-40	Z-40	Othello AFS	WA	46°43′18″N 119°10′23″W	637th Aircraft Control and Warning (later Radar) Squadron	1951	1975	(637th)
P-19	Z-19	Antigo AFS	WI	45°02′54″N 089°14′02″W	676th Aircraft Control and Warning (later Radar) Squadron	1951	1977	
P-35	Z-35	Osceola AFS	WI	45°15′05″N 092°38′34″W	674th Aircraft Control and Warning (later Radar) Squadron	1951	1975	
M-106		Two Creeks AFS	WI	44°19′28″N 087°34′45″W	700th Aircraft Control and Warning Squadron	1954	1957	Chicago/20th
P-31		Williams Bay AFS	WI	42°37′01″N 088°32′19″W	755th Aircraft Control and Warning Squadron	1951	1960	
P-43	Z-43	Guthrie AFS	WV	38°26′35″N 081°40′50″W	783d Aircraft Control and Warning (later Radar) Squadron	1951	1968	
TM-201	Z-201	Sundance AFS	WY	44°28′43″N 104°27′06″W	731st Radar Squadron	1960	1968	
TT-2		Texas Tower No. 2		41°44′00″N 067°47′00″W	762d Aircraft Control and Warning (later Radar) Squadron (Annex)	1958	1963	New York/21st
TT-3		Texas Tower No. 3		40°45′00″N 069°19′00″W	773d Aircraft Control and Warning (later Radar) Squadron (Annex)	1958	1963	New York/21st
TT-4		Texas Tower No. 4		39°48′00″N 072°40′00″W	646th Aircraft Control and Warning Squadron (Annex)	1959	1961	New York/21st

== Replacement ==
Many of the SAGE radar stations, particularly the locations with Air Route Surveillance Radars (e.g., San Pedro Hill Z-39) were retained when the SAGE System was replaced by the Joint Surveillance System for which the USAF declared full operational capability of the first seven Regional Operational Control Centers (ROCCs) on December 23, 1980 (the NORAD Command Center was also upgraded). SAGE radar stations discontinued in 1980 included Almaden (activated 1957), Cambria (1951). Dauphin Island (1959), MacDill (1954), Mill Valley (1951), North Bend (1951), and North Charleston (1955); and stations eventually transferring to the Federal Aviation Administration included Mill Valley Air Force Station.

External image
- CDTS OA-1204 & -367 consoles

== See also ==
- Permanent System radar stations
- Joint Surveillance System
