= Lake Charles Air Force Station =

Closed United States Air Force General Surveillance Radar station

Lake Charles Air Force Station
- Part of Air Defense Command (ADC)

Site information
- Type: Air Force Station
- Controlled by: United States Air Force

Location
- Location of Lake Charles AFS, Louisiana
- Coordinates: 30°11′03″N 093°10′33″W

Site history
- Built: 1957
- In use: 1957-1995

Lake Charles Air Force Station (ADC ID: TM-194, NORAD ID: Z-248) is a closed United States Air Force General Surveillance Radar station. It is located 3.8 miles (6.1 km) southeast of Lake Charles, Louisiana. It was closed in 1995 by the Air Force, and turned over to the Federal Aviation Administration (FAA).

Today the site is part of the Joint Surveillance System (JSS), designated by NORAD as Eastern Air Defense Sector (EADS) Ground Equipment Facility J-14.

== History ==
Lake Charles Air Force Station was, actually, two different facilities that shared the same location, active in two different eras.

The first Lake Charles Air Force Station (ADC ID: TM-194) was as part of the Phase III of the Air Defense Command Mobile Radar program. On 20 October 1953 ADC requested a third phase of twenty-five radar sites be constructed. The 812th Aircraft Control and Warning Squadron was assigned to the new base on 30 April 1957 by the 33d Air Division. In 1958 the 812th AC&W Squadron activated AN/FPS-3A and AN/FPS-6 radars, and initially the station functioned as a Ground-Control Intercept (GCI) and warning station. As a GCI station, the squadron's role was to guide interceptor aircraft toward unidentified intruders picked up on the unit's radar scopes.

On 1 September 1961, the 812th was inactivated, and the Lake Charles site was converted into a gap-filler radar site (M-125D) for England AFB, LA, operating an AN/FPS-18. The FPS-18 inactivated on 30 June 1963 along with the 653d Aircraft Control and Warning Squadron at England Air Force Base.

The second Lake Charles Air Force Station was opened in 1972 when Tactical Air Command (TAC) constructed five new buildings at the former Lake Charles (TM-194) site. The new station was designated with NORAD ID Z-248. TAC set up an AN/TPS-43 radar on the newly constructed search tower. Eventually, Aerospace Defense Command assumed control of the site, and placed AN/FPS-93 and AN/FPS-6 radars at the site. These radars were operated as Operating Location F of the Houston-based 630th Radar Squadron during 1972 and 1973. Control of the site was reassigned to the 634th Radar Squadron on 1 January 1973, and inactivated on 1 July 1974.

After the 634th RADS inactivated, activities were assumed by Operating Location D of the Tyndall AFB-based 678th Air Defense Group as part of the Southeast Air Defense Sector (SEADS). The site continued operations over the next two decades with approximated twenty Air Force and civilian personnel with the 678th ADG tracking aircraft attempting to illegally enter the country. The final radars were an AN/FPS-91A search radar and an AN/FPS-116height-finder radar (retired c. 1988).

Lake Charles AFS closed for good on 30 September 1995, being replaced by a new FAA ARSR-4 Joint Surveillance System (JSS) site 20 miles northwest of Lake Charles.

Today, for the first radar Site TM-194, the original Operations Building and the Power Plant are still extant on the west end of the site, and the original HQ Building is still extant near the site entrance. A private residence occupies the site of the original GAG Radio facility, later gap-filler annex (M-125D), on the east end of the site. Nothing visible remains of the site's second incarnation, Z-248. The current owner of the site is McNeese State University.

== See also ==
- List of USAF Aerospace Defense Command General Surveillance Radar Stations
