= 31st Air Division =

31st Air Division

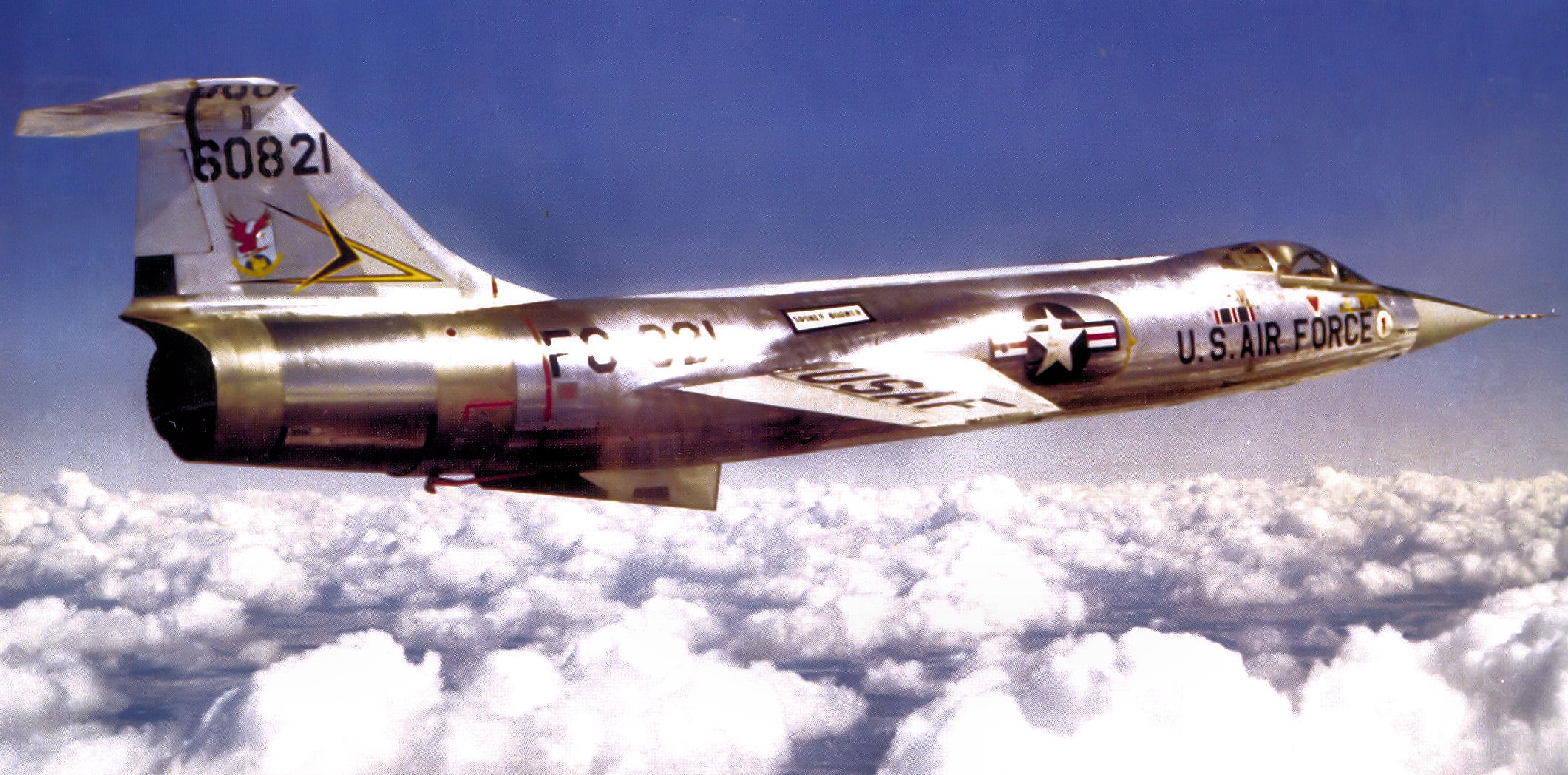
- F-104A Starfighter of the division's 331st Fighter-Interceptor Squadron
- Active: 1950–1960; 1966–1969
- Country: United States
- Branch: United States Air Force
- Role: Command of air defense forces
- Part of: Air Defense Command

Insignia
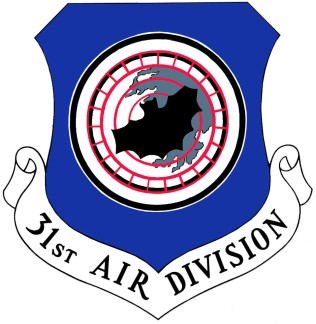
- 31st Air Division emblem (Approved 19 March 1954)

The 31st Air Division (31st AD) is an inactive United States Air Force organization. Its last assignment was with Air Defense Command, assigned to Tenth Air Force, being stationed at Sioux City Municipal Airport, Iowa. It was inactivated on 31 December 1969.

== History ==
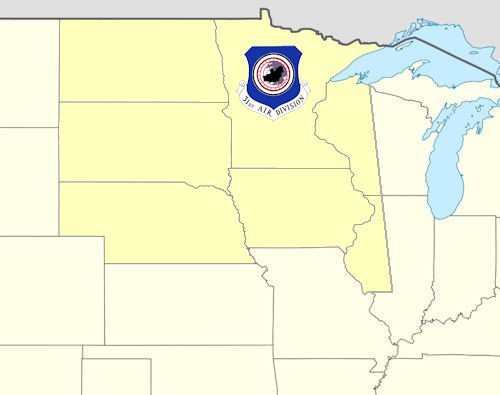
31st Air Division ADC AOR 1950–1960

Assigned to Air Defense Command (ADC) for most of its existence, the division equipped, administered, trained, and provided combat ready forces within an area covering North Dakota, South Dakota, Nebraska, Minnesota, and other parts of the Midwest. The division participated in numerous live and simulated exercises such as Creek Chief, Pawnee Knife, and Mandan Hunt.

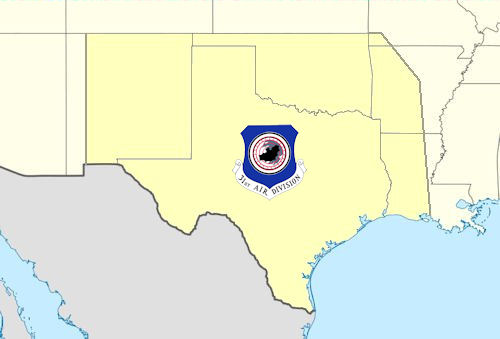
31st Air Division ADC AOR 1966–1969

Later, beginning in 1966, the 31st assumed responsibility for the former Oklahoma City Air Defense Sector and covered an area including Texas, Oklahoma, Arkansas, and Louisiana. Assumed additional designation of 31st NORAD Region after activation of the NORAD Combat Operations Center at the Cheyenne Mountain Complex, Colorado and reporting was transferred to NORAD from ADC at Ent Air Force Base in April 1966.

Inactivated in December 1969 as ADC phased down its interceptor mission as the chances of a Soviet bomber attack on the United States seemed remote, its mission being consolidated into North American Aerospace Defense Command (NORAD).

== Lineage ==
- Established as the 31st Air Division (Defense) on 7 September 1950

Activated on 8 October 1950
Inactivated on 1 February 1952

- Organized on 1 February 1952

Inactivated on 1 January 1960

- Redesignated 31st Air Division and activated on 20 January 1966 (not organized)

Organized on 1 April 1966
Inactivated on 31 December 1969

=== Assignments ===
- Air Defense Command

Eastern Air Defense Force, 8 October 1950 (attached 30th Air Division, 27 November 1950 – 1 February 1951
Central Air Defense Force, 20 May 1951 – 1 January 1960

- Air Defense Command, 20 January 1966 (not organized)

Fourteenth Air Force, 1 April 1966 – 1 July 1968 (ConAC)
Tenth Air Force, 1 July 1968 – 31 December 1969

=== Stations ===
- Selfridge Air Force Base, Michigan, 8 October 1950 – 1 February 1952
- Fort Snelling (later Snelling Air Force Station), Minnesota, 1 February 1952 – 1 January 1960
- Oklahoma City Air Force Station, Oklahoma, 1 April 1966 – 31 December 1969

=== Components ===
==== Sectors ====
- Duluth Air Defense Sector: 20 December 1957 – 1 January 1959

Duluth Municipal Airport, Minnesota

- Grand Forks Air Defense Sector: 8 December 1957 – 1 January 1959

Grand Forks Air Force Base, North Dakota

==== Groups ====
53d Fighter Group: 18 August 1955 – 1 March 1956
Sioux City Municipal Airport, Iowa
343d Fighter Group: 18 August 1955 – 1 January 1959
Duluth Municipal Airport, Minnesota
475th Fighter Group: 18 August 1955 – 2 January 1958
Minneapolis-Saint Paul Municipal Airport, Minnesota

- 478th Fighter Group: 8 February 1957 – 1 January 1959

Grand Forks Air Force Base, North Dakota

- 514th Air Defense Group: 16 February 1953 – 18 August 1955

Minneapolis-Saint Paul Municipal Airport, Minnesota

- 515th Air Defense Group: 16 February 1953 – 18 August 1955

Duluth Municipal Airport, Minnesota

- 521st Air Defense Group: 16 February 1953 – 18 August 1955.

Sioux City Municipal Airport, Iowa

==== Interceptor squadrons ====
- 11th Fighter-Interceptor Squadron: 1 December 1952 – 16 February 1953

Duluth Municipal Airport, Minnesota

- 18th Fighter-Interceptor Squadron: 1 December 1952 – 16 February 1953

Minneapolis-Saint Paul Municipal Airport, Minnesota

- 54th Fighter-Interceptor Squadron: 1 December 1952 – 16 February 1953

Ellsworth Air Force Base, South Dakota

- 87th Fighter-Interceptor Squadron: 1 November 1952 – 16 February 1953

Sioux City Municipal Airport, Iowa

- 331st Fighter-Interceptor Squadron: 1 April 1966 – 1 March 1967

Webb Air Force Base, Texas

- 432d Fighter-Interceptor Squadron: 1 December 1952 – 16 February 1953

Truax Field, Wisconsin

- 433d Fighter-Interceptor Squadron: 1 November 1952 – 16 February 1953

Truax Field, Wisconsin

==== Radar squadrons ====
- 650th Aircraft Control and Warning Squadron

Dallas Center Air Force Station, Iowa, 1 July 1955 – 1 March 1956

- 676th Aircraft Control and Warning Squadron

Antigo Air Force Station, Wisconsin, 6 February 1952 – 16 February 1953

- 683d Aircraft Control and Warning Squadron

Sweetwater Air Force Station, Texas, 1 April 1966 – 30 September 1969

- 687th Aircraft Control and Warning Squadron

West Mesa Air Force Station, New Mexico, 1 April 1966 – 8 September 1968

- 688th Aircraft Control and Warning Squadron

Amarillo Air Force Base, Texas, 1 April 1966 – 8 September 1968

- 692d Aircraft Control and Warning Squadron

Baudette Air Force Station, Minnesota, 1 October 1958 – 1 January 1959

- 703d Aircraft Control and Warning Squadron

Texarkana Air Force Station, Arkansas, 1 April 1966 – 8 September 1968

- 707th Aircraft Control and Warning Squadron

Grand Rapids Air Force Station, Minnesota, 1 July 1956 – 1 January 1959

- 739th Aircraft Control and Warning Squadron

Wadena Air Force Station, Minnesota, 1 February 1953 – 1 January 1959

- 740th Aircraft Control and Warning Squadron

Rapid City Air Force Base, South Dakota, 1–16 February 1953

- 741st Aircraft Control and Warning Squadron

Lackland Air Force Base, Texas, 1 April 1966 – 31 December 1969

- 745th Aircraft Control and Warning Squadron

Perrin Air Force Station, Texas, 1 April 1966 – 30 September 1969

- 746th Aircraft Control and Warning Squadron

Oklahoma City Air Force Station, Oklahoma, 1 April 1966 – 8 September 1968

- 756th Aircraft Control and Warning Squadron

Finland Air Force Station, Minnesota, 6 February 1952 – 1 July 1959

- 785th Aircraft Control and Warning Squadron

Finley Air Force Station, North Dakota, 6 February 1952 – 16 February 1953

- 786th Aircraft Control and Warning Squadron

Minot Air Force Station, North Dakota, 6 February 1952 – 16 February 1953

- 787th Aircraft Control and Warning Squadron

Chandler Air Force Station, Minnesota, 6 February 1952 – 1 January 1959

- 788th Aircraft Control and Warning Squadron

Waverly Air Force Station, Iowa, 6 February 1952 – 1 March 1956

- 789th Aircraft Control and Warning Squadron

Omaha Air Force Station, Nebraska, 6 February 1952 – 1 March 1956

- 791st Aircraft Control and Warning Squadron

Hanna City Air Force Station, Illinois, 6 February 1952 – 1 March 1956

- 808th Aircraft Control and Warning Squadron

Rochester Air Force Station, Minnesota, 1 September 1955 – 9 September 1957

- 903d Aircraft Control and Warning Squadron]

Gettysburg Air Force Station, South Dakota, 1 March 1956 – 1 January 1959

- 915th Aircraft Control and Warning Squadron

Sioux Lookout Air Station, Ontario, 16 December 1952 – 1 January 1959

- 916th Aircraft Control and Warning Squadron

Beausejour Air Station, Manitoba, 1 December 1952 – 1 January 1959

== See also ==
- List of United States Air Force Aerospace Defense Command Interceptor Squadrons
- List of United States Air Force air divisions
- United States general surveillance radar stations
