= Oklahoma City Air Force Station =

Historical Air Force station

Oklahoma City Air Force Station
- Part of Air Force Materiel Command
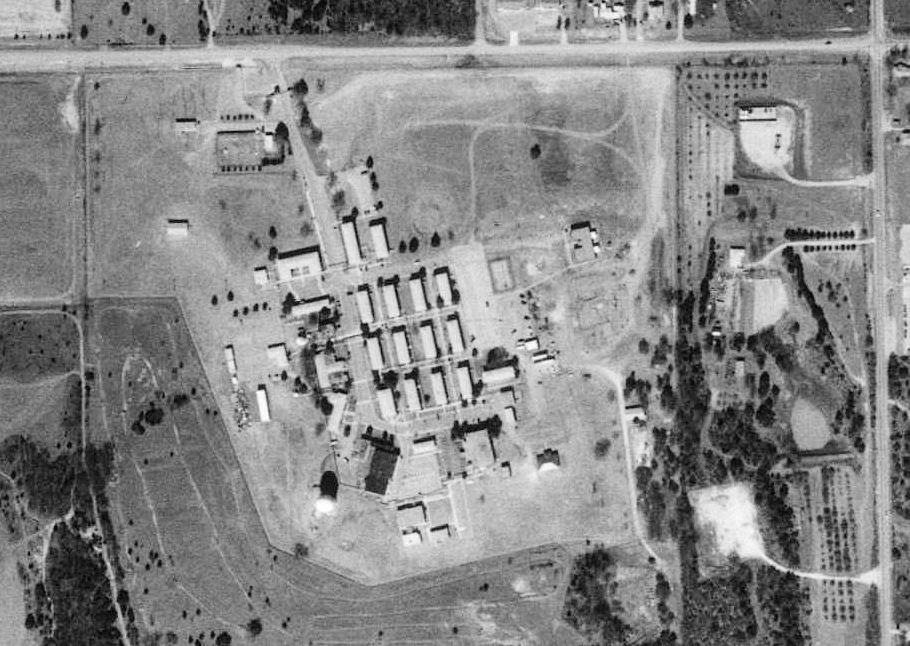
- 1995 airphoto

Site information
- Type: United States Air Force Station (Cold War)
- Controlled by: United States Air Force

Location
- Location of Oklahoma City AFS, Oklahoma
- Coordinates: 35°24′12″N 097°21′28″W

Site history
- Built: 1942
- In use: 1951–1968

Oklahoma City Air Force Station (ADC ID: P-52, NORAD-ID: Z-52) is a closed Cold War United States Air Force air defense and communications-electronics headquarters and radar station. It was located 10 miles (16 km) east-southeast of Oklahoma City, Oklahoma, just to the southeast of Tinker Air Force Base. It ceased to be a separate Air Force installation on 1 October 1983, when it merged with Tinker.

== History ==
=== Air Defense Command ===
In late 1951 Air Defense Command selected the station as a site for one of twenty-eight radar stations built as part of the second segment of the permanent radar surveillance network. Prompted by the start of the Korean War, on July 11, 1950, the Secretary of the Air Force asked the Secretary of Defense for approval to expedite construction of the second segment of the permanent network. Receiving the Defense Secretary's approval on July 21, the Air Force exercised a right of return to the former World War II airfield and directed the Army Corps of Engineers to proceed with construction.

On 1 May 1951 the 148th Aircraft Control and Warning Squadron of the California Air National Guard was assigned to the new Oklahoma City Air Force Station by the 33d Air Division at nearby Tinker AFB. The squadron began operating a pair of AN/FPS-10 radars from this site in May 1952, and initially the station functioned as a ground-control intercept (GCI) and warning station. As a GCI station, the squadron's role was to guide interceptor aircraft toward unidentified intruders picked up on the unit's radar scopes. On February 1, 1953, the 746th Aircraft Control and Warning Squadron assumed operations. The 746th AC&WS added an AN/FPS-6 height-finder radar in 1958. The AN/FPS-10s were phased out, with the last one being removed in 1962.

The 33d AD moved to Oklahoma City AFS on 8 May 1956 and activated a Manual Air-Defense Control Center (ADCC), P-86 for ADC interceptors in Oklahoma, Kansas and the panhandle of Texas. It also formed a number of new Aircraft Control and Warning Squadrons which it deployed to newly built radar sites in its assigned area. On 1 January 1960, the Oklahoma City Air Defense Sector (OCADS) was established, however it remained a manual ADS, with no SAGE blockhouse being constructed. OCADS was re-designated as the 4752d ADS briefly in 1960–61, then taken over by the 32d Air Division in 1961–63 before being returned to its designation in 1963. On 31 July 1963, the site was redesignated as NORAD ID Z-52. In 1963 the station became a joint-use facility with the Federal Aviation Administration (FAA), with Oklahoma City AFS using AN/FPS-67 search and AN/FPS-6 height-finder radars.

OCADS was re-established in 1963 and was re-designated as Manual Combat Center (MCC-11)/NORAD Sector Combat Center (Manual). In 1965 the search radar was upgraded to the AN/FPS-67B variant. On 1 April 1966 OCADS was again re-designated as the 31st Air Division

The Air Force closed MCC-11 on 31 December 1969 due to budget reductions. The FAA continues to operate the AN/FPS-67B search radar today as part of the Joint Surveillance System (JSS).

After ADCOM ceased operations at Oklahoma City AFS, its facilities were occupied by Air Force Communications Service (AFCS), which activated its Southern Communications Area (SCA), a headquarters for all AFCS units in the southern states of the United States except for those located on Tactical Air Command bases, which were assigned to Tactical Communications Area. Although only AFCS units were located on the station, it was considered an off-base station of Tinker and belonged to Air Force Logistics Command. On 1 October 1983 the station merged with Tinker AFB and lost its status as a separate installation. In June 1976, SCA was reduced in size as it lost its squadrons on Strategic Air Command stations to the new Strategic Communications Area

SCA was inactivated on 1 June 1981 in a major reorganization of AFCS (now named Air Force Communications Command), as all communications units in the US that were not assigned to combat commands were reassigned to Continental Communications Division at Griffiss AFB, New York. However, at the same time, all USAF units responsible for engineering and installing ground communications-electronics systems worldwide were assigned to AFCC's Engineering Installation Center, which took over the facilities of SCA. The EI Center became a Division in 1985 and was renamed the Communications Systems Center in 1991. As AFCC lost its Major Command status and communications functions were transferred to the other commands, the Communications Systems Center was reassigned to the Electronic Systems Center of Air Force Materiel Command in October 1993 and was inactivated in 1994 as its mission was transferred to the 38th Electronic Installation Wing. As mission needs were reduced the 38th EIW was inactivated in 2000 and its group remained the only unit on the former station.

What was Oklahoma City Air Force Station is today used by the FAA and the Air Force 38th Engineering Installation Group, with most buildings remaining in use.

=== ADCOM units assigned to Oklahoma City Air Force Station ===
- 31st Air Division, 1 April 1966 – 31 December 1969
- 32d Air Division, 1 August 1961 – 4 September 1963
- 33d Air Division, 8 May 1956 – 1 January 1960
- Oklahoma City Air Defense Sector, 1 January 1960 – 1 September 1961; 25 June 1963 – 1 April 1966
- 4752d Air Defense Wing, 1 September 1961 – 25 June 1963

- 732d Aircraft Control and Warning Squadron, 8 November 1956 – 25 July 1957
- 733d Aircraft Control and Warning Squadron, 8 September 1956 – 3 July 1957
- 742d Aircraft Control and Warning Squadron, 8 September 1956 – 1 July 1957
- 746th Aircraft Control and Warning Squadron, 8 July 1956 – 8 September 1968
- 811th Aircraft Control and Warning Squadron, 8 April 1956 – 1 January 1958
- 812th Aircraft Control and Warning Squadron, 8 April 1956 – 30 April 1957
- 813th Aircraft Control and Warning Squadron, 18 December 1956 – 1 July 1958
- 814th Aircraft Control and Warning Squadron, 8 May 1956 – 14 February 1957
- 815th Aircraft Control and Warning Squadron, 8 November 1956 – 1 November 1957

=== Air Force Communications Command units stationed at Oklahoma City Air Force Station ===
- Southern Communications Area, 1 May 1970 – 1 June 1981
- Engineering Installation Center (later Engineering Installation Division, Communications Systems Center), 1 June 1981 – 8 November 1994
- 38th Engineering Installation Wing, 8 November 1994 – 3 February 2000
- 1845th Electronic Engineering Group (later 1845th Engineering Installation Group, 38th Engineering Installation Group, 38th Cyberspace Engineering Group), 1 August 1988 – present
- 38th Mission Support Squadron, 17 January 1995 – 3 February 2000
- 1810th Reserve Advisor Squadron, 1 January 1976 – ca 1991
- 1845th Electronic Engineering Squadron, 1 May 1970 – 1 June 1981

== See also ==
- United States general surveillance radar stations
