= Perrin Air Force Station =

Historical air force station

Perrin Air Force Station
- Part of Air Defense Command (ADC)

Site information
- Type: Air Force Station
- Controlled by: United States Air Force

Location
- Location of Perrin AFS, Texas
- Coordinates: 33°42′17″N 096°38′54″W

Site history
- Built: 1964
- In use: 1964-1969

Garrison information
- Garrison: 745th Aircraft Control and Warning Squadron

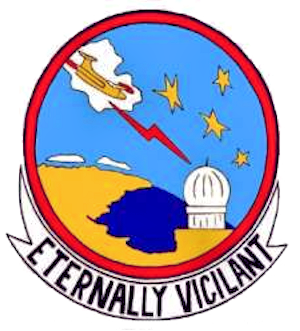
Emblem of the 745th Aircraft Control and Warning Squadron

Perrin Air Force Station (ADC ID: RP-78, NORAD ID: Z-78) is a closed United States Air Force General Surveillance Radar station. It is located 1.3 miles (2.1 km) southeast of North Texas Regional Airport, Texas, but was closed in 1971.

== History ==
Founded in 1941 as a training site for World War II pilots, named after Lieutenant Colonel Elmer Daniel Perrin, a Texan native and Air Corps pilot who was killed during the acceptance test flight of a B-26 bomber in Baltimore, Maryland, in June 1941. The field was deactivated in 1946, but reopened as Perrin Air Force Base in April 1948. The base held jet pilot and survival training for flight crews through 1969. Perrin Air Force Radar Station was established during the Korean War in 1952. Initially, the station functioned as a ground-control intercept (GCI) and warning station. As a GCI station, the squadron's role was to guide interceptor aircraft toward unidentified intruders picked up on the unit's radar scopes. In 1962, operation of the radar site was transferred to Air Defense Command and Perrin Air Force Station was established as an annex of Duncanville AFS, Texas. It was equipped with an AN/FPS-20 search radar and an AN/FPS-6 height-finder radar. At the end of 1963, the site was performing duty as a joint-use facility for the Federal Aviation Administration and Air Defense Command.

In 1964, the 745th Aircraft Control and Warning Squadron relocated to Perrin from Duncanville AFS after it was closed. Upon activation, it was designated as RP-78, replacing the P-78 site at Duncanville. It was also designated as NORAD site Z-78. Also in 1964, the search radar was upgraded to an AN/FPS-20A; in 1965, this radar was further upgraded to an AN/FPS-66.

The 745th AC&W Squadron was inactivated on 30 September 1969 and Perrin AFS was closed on 30 June 1971 due to a draw-down of ADC and budget constraints. Today, the former radar site is used by small businesses in the area.

== Air Force units and assignments ==
Units:

- 745th Aircraft Control and Warning Squadron, Assigned 1 July 1964

Inactivated on 30 September 1969

Assignments:

- Oklahoma City Air Defense Sector, 1 July 1964
- 31st Air Division, 1 April 1966 – 30 September 1969

== See also ==
- List of USAF Aerospace Defense Command General Surveillance Radar Stations
- Perrin Air Force Base Historical Museum
