= CFS Beausejour =

Radar station in Manitoba, Canada 1953–1986

Site information
- Type: Radar Station
- Controlled by: Royal Canadian Air Force

Location
- Coordinates: 50°08′53″N 096°13′24″W

Site history
- Built: 1953
- In use: 1953-1988

Location of Canadian Forces Station Beausejour, Manitoba

Station badge

Canadian Forces Station Beausejour (ADC ID: C-17) is a closed General Surveillance Radar station. It is located 45.1 miles (72.6 km) east-northeast of Winnipeg, Manitoba. It was closed in 1986.

It was operated as part of the Pinetree Line network controlled by NORAD.

== History ==
As a result of the Cold War and with the expansion of a North American continental air defence system, The site at Beausejour was selected as a site for a United States Air Force (USAF) radar station, one of the many that would make up the Pinetree Line of Ground-Control Intercept (GCI) radar sites. Construction on the base began in 1952 and was completed late that year.

The base was manned by members of the USAF's Air Defense Command (ADC) 916th Aircraft Control and Warning Squadron, being known as Beausejour Air Station. In December 1952, operations began at the unit's permanent home. The station was equipped with AN/FPS-3C, AN/FPS-502, AN/FPS-20A; AN/TPS-502, AN/FPS-6B and AN/FPS-507 radars.

As a GCI base, the 915th's role was to guide interceptor aircraft toward unidentified intruders picked up on the unit's radar scopes. These interceptors were based at Duluth, Minnesota under the 31st Air Division.

In the early 1960s, the USAF relinquished control of the base to the Royal Canadian Air Force (RCAF). This was part of an arrangement with the United States that came as a result of the cancellation of the Avro Arrow. Canada would lease 66 F-101 Voodoo fighters and take over operation of 12 Pinetree radar bases.

Upon hand-over on 1 October 1961, the operating unit was re-designated 48 Aircraft Control & Warning Squadron and the base became RCAF Station Beausejour. It was also upgraded with the following radars:

- Search Radars: AN/FPS-3C, AN/FPS-502, AN/FPS-20A, AN/FPS-93A
- Height Radars: AN/TPS-502, AN/FPS-6B, AN/FPS-507

Radar operations at 48 Squadron were automated on 1 May 1963 by the Semi Automatic Ground Environment (SAGE) system, and the station became a long-range radar site. It would no longer guide interceptors but only look for enemy aircraft, feeding data to the Grand Forks Air Defense Sector SAGE DC-11 Direction Center of the 31st NORAD Region. It was later switched to the Duluth Air Defense Sector SAGE DC-10 Direction Center of the 29th NORAD Region.

Also that year, the military address was changed to Muskwa. As a result of the unification of the Canadian Forces in 1968, the new Canadian Forces organization absorbed the RCAF, RCN and the Canadian Army. 48 Radar Squadron, RCAF Station Beausejour, became simply Canadian Forces Station (CFS) Beausejour in 1966. This also avoided confusion between the station and the town of the same name.

In August 1984, the station became part of Canada West ROCC. In January 1985 the word came out that CFS Beausejour's days were numbered. The last day for this prairie radar sentinel was 31 July 1986.

The former station then became the Manitoba Regional Correctional Centre, later renamed the Milner Ridge Correctional Centre. Most of the buildings and radar towers remained, with the former gatehouse converted into a staff lounge when a new gatehouse was built.

== See also ==
- List of Royal Canadian Air Force stations
- List of USAF Aerospace Defense Command General Surveillance Radar Stations
