= Rockport Air Force Station =

Closed United States Air Force General Surveillance Radar station

Rockport Air Force Station
- Part of Air Defense Command (ADC)

Site information
- Type: Air Force Station
- Controlled by: United States Air Force

Location
- Location of Rockport AFS, Texas
- Coordinates: 28°05′30″N 097°02′45″W

Site history
- Built: 1959
- In use: 1959-1963

Garrison information
- Garrison: 813th Aircraft Control and Warning Squadron

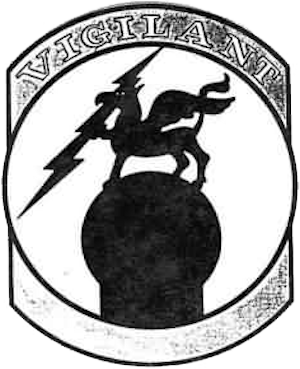
Emblem of the 813th Aircraft Control and Warning Squadron

Rockport Air Force Station (ADC ID: TM-191) is a closed United States Air Force General Surveillance Radar station. It is located 4.1 miles (6.6 km) southwest of Lamar, Texas. It was closed in 1963.

== History ==
Rockport Air Force Station came into existence as part of Phase III of the Air Defense Command Mobile Radar program. On 20 October 1953 ADC requested a third phase of twenty-five radar sites be constructed.

The 813th Aircraft Control and Warning Squadron was assigned on 1 July 1958. It operated an AN/FPS-3 search radar and an AN/FPS-6 height-finder radar at the site. The station functioned as a Ground-Control Intercept (GCI) and warning station. As a GCI station, the squadron's role was to guide interceptor aircraft toward unidentified intruders picked up on the unit's radar scopes.

In addition to the main facility, Rockport operated three AN/FPS-18 Gap Filler sites:

- Riviera, TX (TM-191A): 27°19′38″N 097°44′35″W
- Palacios, TX (TM-191B): 28°41′24″N 096°14′51″W
- Delmita, TX (TM-191C): 26°39′00″N 098°27′39″W

The Air Force inactivated Rockport AFS on 1 August 1963 due to budgetary constraints. Today, not much of the station remains. A few buildings, some disconnected streets in poor repair and most of the area is overgrown grass adjacent to the Aransas County Airport is all that remains. The nearby Air Force housing area remains intact, long-ago sold off and being used as single-family housing.

== Air Force units and assignments ==
=== Units ===
- Constituted as the 813th Aircraft Control and Warning Squadron

Activated on 18 December 1956 at Oklahoma City AFS, OK (not equipped or manned)
Moved to Rockport AFS on assigned 1 July 1958
Discontinued and inactivated on 1 August 1963

=== Assignments ===
- 33d Air Division, 1 January 1958
- Oklahoma City Air Defense Sector, 1 Jan 1960
- 4752d Air Defense Wing, 1 September 1961
- Oklahoma City Air Defense Sector 25 July 1963 – 1 August 1963

== See also ==
- List of USAF Aerospace Defense Command General Surveillance Radar Stations
