= Port Isabel Air Force Station =

Closed United States Air Force General Surveillance Radar station

Port Isabel Air Force Station
- Part of Air Defense Command (ADC)

Site information
- Type: Air Force Station
- Controlled by: United States Air Force

Location
- Location of Port Isabel AFS, Texas
- Coordinates: 26°09′20″N 097°20′16″W

Site history
- Built: 1958
- In use: 1958-1961

Garrison information
- Garrison: 811th Aircraft Control and Warning Squadron

Port Isabel Air Force Station (ADC ID: TM-190) is a closed United States Air Force General Surveillance Radar station. It is located 18.7 miles (30.1 km) north-northeast of Brownsville, Texas. It was closed in 1961.

== History ==
Port Isabel Air Force Station came into existence as part of Phase III of the Air Defense Command Mobile Radar program. On 20 October 1953 ADC requested a third phase of twenty-five radar sites be constructed.

The 811th Aircraft Control and Warning Squadron was moved to the former Port Isabel Auxiliary Naval Air Station on 1 January 1958. It operated an AN/FPS-3A search radar and an AN/FPS-6 height-finder radar at the site, and initially the station functioned as a Ground-Control Intercept (GCI) and warning station. As a GCI station, the squadron's role was to guide interceptor aircraft toward unidentified intruders picked up on the unit's radar scopes.

The Air Force inactivated Port Isabel AFS on 1 June 1961 due to budgetary constraints. Today the site is part of the Port Isabel-Cameron County Airport and the Port Isabel Detention Center.

== Air Force units and assignments ==
=== Units ===
- Constituted as the 811th Aircraft Control and Warning Squadron

Activated on 8 November 1956 at Oklahoma City AFS, OK (not equipped or manned)
Moved to Port Isabel AFS on 1 January 1958
Discontinued and inactivated on 1 June 1961

=== Assignments ===
- 33d Air Division, 1 January 1958
- Oklahoma City Air Defense Sector, 1 January 1960 – 1 June 1961

== See also ==
- List of USAF Aerospace Defense Command General Surveillance Radar Stations
