= Zapata Air Force Station =

Closed United States Air Force General Surveillance Radar station

Zapata Air Force Station
- Part of Air Defense Command (ADC)

Site information
- Type: Air Force Station
- Controlled by: United States Air Force

Location
- Location of Zapata AFS, Texas
- Coordinates: 26°57′08″N 099°16′31″W

Site history
- Built: 1957
- In use: 1957-1961

Garrison information
- Garrison: 742d Aircraft Control and Warning Squadron

Zapata Air Force Station (ADC ID: TM-189) is a closed United States Air Force General Surveillance Radar station. It is located 3.2 miles (5.1 km) north of Zapata, Texas. It was closed in 1961.

== History ==
Zapata Air Force Station came into existence as part of Phase III of the Air Defense Command Mobile Radar program. On 20 October 1953 ADC requested a third phase of twenty-five radar sites be constructed.

The 742d Aircraft Control and Warning Squadron was assigned to the station by the 33d Air Division on 1 July 1957. It initially operated an AN/FPS-3A search radar and an AN/FPS-6 height-finder radar, and initially the station functioned as a Ground-Control Intercept (GCI) and warning station. As a GCI station, the squadron's role was to guide interceptor aircraft toward unidentified intruders picked up on the unit's radar scopes.

In addition to the main facility, Zapata operated an AN/FPS-14 Gap Filler site:

- Delmita, TX (TM-189A): 26°39′00″N 098°27′38″W

The site was deactivated on 1 June 1961 due to budgetary constraints. Today what was Zapata Air Force Station was sold to private ownership and the County of Zapata. It is now known as the Laspalmas RV Park. After being sold, part of the base was divided into small lots and sold individually to private owners, who drive mobile trailers or campers to the lots and remain there through the winter months. The remainder of the site is vacant. It has reverted to, and is owned by, the county of Zapata. Most of the buildings remain in use and the site is well-maintained.

== Air Force units and assignments ==
Units:

- 742d Aircraft Control and Warning Squadron, Assigned 1 July 1957 to Zapata Air Force Station

Activated by 33d AD at Oklahoma City AFS on 8 September 1956

Discontinued on 1 June 1961

Assignments:

- 33d Air Division, 1 July 1957
- Oklahoma City Air Defense Sector, 1 January 1960 – 1 June 1961

What was Zapata Air Force Station was sold to private ownership and the County of Zapata. Today it is known as the "HAWK BASE". After being bought by Mr.Roberto Lopez, Sr Founder, Owner and President of Hawk Oilfield Service, Inc. Hawk Base serves as a central station to all Hawk satellite locations throughout south Texas.

== See also ==
- List of USAF Aerospace Defense Command General Surveillance Radar Stations
