= Kingman Air Force Station =

Former USAF General Surveillance Radar station

Kingman Air Force Station
- Part of Air Defense Command (ADC)

Site information
- Type: Air Force Station
- Controlled by: United States Air Force

Location
- Location of Kingman AFS, Arizona
- Coordinates: 35°11′51″N 114°02′29″W

Site history
- Built: 1955
- In use: 1955-1958

Garrison information
- Garrison: 659th Aircraft Control and Warning Squadron

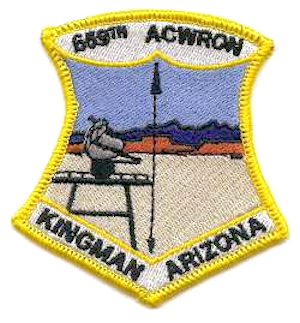
Emblem of the 659th Aircraft Control and Warning Squadron

Kingman Air Force Station (ADC ID: M-128) is a closed United States Air Force General Surveillance Radar station. It is located 1 mile (1.6 km) southwest of Kingman, Arizona. It was closed in 1958.

== Air Force units and assignments ==
Units:

- 659th Aircraft Control and Warning Squadron, Assigned 22 June 1955

Activated at Norton AFB, California on 20 June 1953

Inactivated on 15 August 1958

Assignments:

- 27th Air Division, 22 June 1955 – 15 August 1958

== See also ==
- List of USAF Aerospace Defense Command General Surveillance Radar Stations
