= 745th Aircraft Control and Warning Squadron =

US Air Force unit

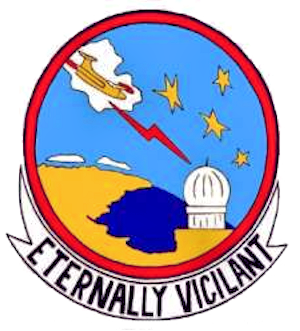
- Emblem of the 745th Aircraft Control and Warning Squadron
- Active: 1952–1963
- Country: United States
- Branch: United States Air Force
- Type: General Radar Surveillance

The 745th Aircraft Control and Warning Squadron is an inactive United States Air Force unit. It was last assigned to the 31st Air Division, Air Defense Command, stationed at Perrin Air Force Station, Texas. It was discontinued on 30 September 1969.

The unit was a General Surveillance Radar squadron providing for the air defense of the United States.

Lineage

- 745th Aircraft Control and Warning Squadron, Activated 1 February 1953

Inactivated on 30 September 1969

Assignments

- 33d Air Division, 1 February 1953
- Oklahoma City Air Defense Sector, 1 January 1960
- 4752d Air Defense Wing, 1 September 1961
- Oklahoma City Air Defense Sector, 25 June 1963
- 31st Air Division, 1 April 1966 – 30 September 1969

Stations

- Duncanville AFS, Texas, 1 February 1953
- Perrin AFS, Texas, 1 July 1964 – 30 September 1969

Plaque noting the 745th, on the missile monument at Duncanville library, on the grounds of the former radar base.
