= Killeen Air Force Station =

Military installation in Killeen, Texas

Killeen Air Force Station
- Part of Air Defense Command (ADC)

Site information
- Type: Air Force Station
- Controlled by: United States Air Force

Location
- Location of Killeen AFS, Texas
- Coordinates: 31°03′04″N 097°51′45″W

Site history
- Built: 1957
- In use: 1957–1961

Garrison information
- Garrison: 814th Aircraft Control and Warning Squadron

Killeen Air Force Station (ADC ID: TM-192) is a closed United States Air Force General Surveillance Radar station. It is located 9.2 miles (14.8 km) west-southwest of Killeen, Texas. It was closed in 1961.

== History ==
Killeen Air Force Station came into existence as part of Phase III of the Air Defense Command (ADC) Mobile Radar program. On 20 October 1953, ADC requested a third phase of twenty-five radar sites be constructed. It was constructed on the existing Robert Gray AFB to provide radar protection for the Fort Hood area.

The 814th Aircraft Control and Warning Squadron was moved to Killeen AFS on 14 February 1957. It operated AN/FPS-20 search radar and an AN/FPS-6 height-finder radars at the station, and initially the station functioned as a Ground-Control Intercept (GCI) and warning station. As a GCI station, the squadron's role was to guide interceptor aircraft toward unidentified intruders picked up on the unit's radar scopes.

In addition to the main facility, Killeen operated two AN/FPS-18 Gap Filler sites between April and December 1960:

- Schulenburg, Texas (TM-192B): 29°45′42″N 096°55′51″W
- Normangee, Texas (TM-192C): 30°59′39″N 096°06′48″W

Killeen was inactivated 1 February 1961 due to budgetary cuts. Today most of the site is unused, but maintained by Fort Hood with most of the buildings being torn down. A radio tower is now on the site. The circular concrete foundation for the AN/FPS-20A search radar tower is clearly visible in aerial imagery.

== Air Force units and assignments ==
=== Units ===
- Constituted as the 814th Aircraft Control and Warning Squadron

Activated on 8 May 1956 at Oklahoma City AFS, OK (not manned or equipped)
Moved to Killeen AFS on 14 February 1957
Discontinued and inactivated on 1 February 1961

=== Assignments ===
- 33d Air Division, 14 February 1957
- Oklahoma City Air Defense Sector, 1 January 1960 – 1 February 1961

== See also ==
- List of USAF Aerospace Defense Command General Surveillance Radar Stations
