= Lufkin Air Force Station =

Closed United States Air Force General Surveillance Radar station

Lufkin Air Force Station
- Part of Air Defense Command (ADC)

Site information
- Type: Air Force Station
- Controlled by: United States Air Force

Location
- Location of Lufkin AFS, Texas
- Coordinates: 31°25′17″N 094°48′10″W

Site history
- Built: 1957
- In use: 1957-1961

Garrison information
- Garrison: 815th Aircraft Control and Warning Squadron

Lufkin Air Force Station (ADC ID: TM-193) is a closed United States Air Force General Surveillance Radar station. It is located 7.2 miles (11.6 km) northwest of Lufkin, Texas. It was closed in 1961.

== History ==
Lufkin Air Force Station came into existence as part of Phase III of the Air Defense Command Mobile Radar program. On 20 October 1953 ADC requested a third phase of twenty-five radar sites be constructed.

The 815th Aircraft Control and Warning Squadron was moved to Lufkin AFS on 14 February 1957. It began operating an AN/FPS-3A search radar and an AN/FPS-6 height-finder radar, and initially the station functioned as a Ground-Control Intercept (GCI) and warning station. As a GCI station, the squadron's role was to guide interceptor aircraft toward unidentified intruders picked up on the unit's radar scopes.

The Air Force inactivated Lufkin on 1 June 1961 due to budgetary constraints. The site is now home to one of the Texas state supported living centers.

== Air Force units and assignments ==
=== Units ===
- Constituted as the 815th Aircraft Control and Warning Squadron

Activated on 8 November 1956 at Oklahoma City AFS, OK (not equipped or manned)
Moved to Lufkin AFS on 1 November 1957
Discontinued and inactivated on 1 June 1961

=== Assignments ===
- 33d Air Division, 1 November 1957
- Oklahoma City Air Defense Sector, 1 Jan 1960 – 1 June 1961

== See also ==
- List of USAF Aerospace Defense Command General Surveillance Radar Stations
