= Ozona Air Force Station =

Closed United States Air Force General Surveillance Radar station

Ozona Air Force Station
- Part of Air Defense Command (ADC)

Site information
- Type: Air Force Station
- Controlled by: United States Air Force

Location
- Location of Ozona AFS, Texas
- Coordinates: 30°42′15″N 101°07′00″W

Site history
- Built: 1957
- In use: 1957-1963

Garrison information
- Garrison: 662d Aircraft Control and Warning Squadron

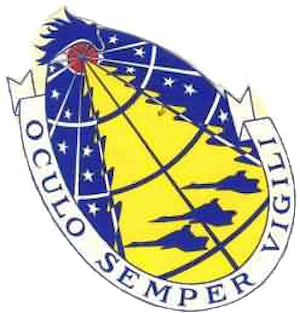
Emblem of the 32d Aircraft Control and Warning Squadron

Ozona Air Force Station (ADC ID: TM-187) is a closed United States Air Force General Surveillance Radar station. It is located 5 miles (8.0 km) east of Ozona, Texas. It was closed in 1963.

== History ==
Ozona Air Force Station came into existence as part of Phase III of the Air Defense Command Mobile Radar program. On 20 October 1953 ADC requested a third phase of twenty-five radar sites be constructed. Ozona Was The Top 30 Air Force Stations.

The 732d Aircraft Control and Warning Squadron was assigned to Oznoma AFS by the 33d Air Division on 8 November 1956. It began operating an AN/FPS-3 search radar and an AN/FPS-6 height-finder radar at the station, and initially the station functioned as a Ground-Control Intercept (GCI) and warning station. As a GCI station, the squadron's role was to guide interceptor aircraft toward unidentified intruders picked up on the unit's radar scopes.

In addition to the main facility, Ozona operated several AN/FPS-14 Gap Filler sites:

- McCamey, TX (TM-187A): 30°54′9″N 102°04′41″W
- Comstock, TX (TM-187B): 29°51′29″N 101°09′42″W

Ozona was closed in 1963 due to budget reductions. Operations ceased on 1 August 1963 and the squadron was discontinued. Today, what was Ozona Air Force Station is privately owned. The station is abandoned, the remaining buildings are frozen in time complete with electrical wires connected to substation which no longer remains. Most of the buildings that remain are in a very deteriorated condition. The former Air Force housing area is in use as single family residences, now called "Crockett Heights". Family's that live in "Crockett Heights" are currently living in old houses that the Military used as the barracks/houses. The houses residences live in, are rebuilt, and are in a perfect condition.

Ozona AFS most important mission was during the Cuban Missile Crisis. Its Radars and radio were used to keep track of the U2's being flown out of Laughlin AFB on their flights over Cuba. The crisis delayed closing the base for another year.

== Air Force units and assignments ==
Units:

- 732d Aircraft Control and Warning Squadron, Assigned 25 July 1957 to Ozona Air Force Station

Activated on 8 November 1956 by 33d AD at Oklahoma City AFS

Discontinued on 1 August 1963

Assignments:

- 33d Air Division, 25 July 1957
- Albuquerque Air Defense Sector, 1 January 1960
- Oklahoma City Air Defense Sector, 15 September 1960
- 4752d Air Defense Wing, 1 September 1961
- Oklahoma City Air Defense Sector, 25 June-1 August 1963

== See also ==
- List of USAF Aerospace Defense Command General Surveillance Radar Stations
