= Perrin Air Force Base Historical Museum =

- Location within Texas
- Location: Denison, Texas
- Coordinates: 33.7089°N 96.6619°W
- Type: Aviation museum
- Website: www.perrinafbhistoricalmuseum.org

The Perrin Air Force Base Historical Museum is an aviation museum located at North Texas Regional Airport near Denison, Texas focused on the history of Perrin Air Force Station.

== History ==
After the base closed in 1971, a group of veterans began holding reunions. Eventually, the Perrin Field Historical Society was founded. Beginning in 2000, an exhibit was placed on display in the Silver Wings Building and the lobby of the airport terminal building.

A 2,400 sq ft (220 m^{2}) building was dedicated on 14 February 2004 and expanded by roughly another 2,400 sq ft (220 m^{2}) in March 2005. The museum acquired a T-37 one month later and an F-86L in 2007.

The museum was forced to move to another site on the airport in 2010, after its existing location was slated for a different use as part of the airport master plan. The new 7,300 sq ft (680 m^{2}) building opened to the public on 2 October 2010.

The museum opened a new extension, the Bill and Peggy Byers Hangar, on 15 May 2021.

== Collection ==
=== Aircraft ===
- Cessna T-37B Tweet
- North American F-86L Sabre

=== Engines ===
- General Electric J47
- Klimov VK-1A

== Events ==
The museum holds a periodical Perrin Air Force Base Reunion.
