= 812th Aircraft Control and Warning Squadron =

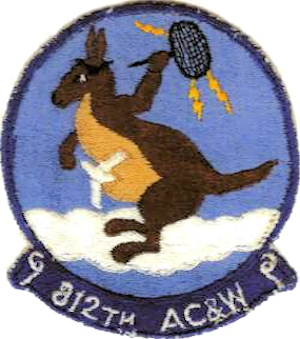
- Emblem of the 812th Aircraft Control and Warning Squadron
- Active: 1956-1961
- Country: United States
- Branch: United States Air Force
- Type: General Radar Surveillance

The 812th Aircraft Control and Warning Squadron is an inactive United States Air Force unit. It was last assigned to the Oklahoma City Air Defense Sector, Air Defense Command, stationed at Lake Charles Air Force Station, Oklahoma. It was discontinued on 1 September 1961.

The unit was a General Surveillance Radar squadron providing for the air defense of the United States.

== Lineage ==
- Constituted as the 812th Aircraft Control and Warning Squadron

Activated on 8 April 1956
Inactivated on 1 September 1961

Assignments

- 33d Air Division, 8 April 1956
- Oklahoma City Air Defense Sector, 1 January 1960 - 1 September 1961

Stations

- Oklahoma City AFS, Oklahoma, 8 April 1956
- Lake Charles AFS, Louisiana, 30 April 1957 - 1 September 1961
