= Duncanville Air Force Station =

Closed United States Air Force radar station

Duncanville Air Force Station
- Part of Air Defense Command (ADC)

Site information
- Type: Air Force Station
- Controlled by: United States Air Force

Location
- Location of Duncanville AFS, Texas
- Coordinates: 32°38′55″N 096°54′25″W

Site history
- Built: 1952
- In use: 1952–1964

Garrison information
- Garrison: 745th Aircraft Control and Warning Squadron

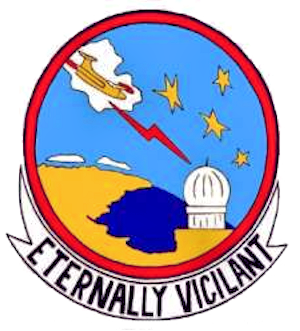
Emblem of the 745th Aircraft Control and Warning Squadron

Duncanville Air Force Station (ADC ID: P-78) is a closed United States Air Force general-surveillance radar station. Located on the east side of Duncanville, Texas, it was closed in 1964.

== History ==
Duncanville Air Force Station was one of 28 stations built as part of the second segment of the permanent Air Defense Command network. Prompted by the start of the Korean War, on 11 July 1950, the Secretary of the Air Force asked the Secretary of Defense for approval to expedite construction of the second segment of the permanent network. Receiving the Defense Secretary's approval on 21 July, the Air Force directed the Corps of Engineers to proceed with construction.

Plaque noting the Duncanville Air Force Station, on monument in Duncanville

Located on the site of the former Naval Air Station, Duncanville, with a mission to provide radar coverage of the Dallas-Fort Worth area, the 745th Aircraft Control and Warning Squadron began operating an AN/CPS-6B and an AN/FPS-10 radar at this site on 1 February 1953, and initially the station functioned as a Ground-Control Intercept and warning station. As such, the squadron's role was to guide interceptor aircraft toward unidentified intruders picked up on the unit's radar scopes. In 1958, the height-finder radar was replaced by an AN/FPS-6.

On 17 July 1957, the AFS, along with two other stations in other states, helped track an unexplained object following an RB-47 Air Force radar reconnaissance jet for more than 90 minutes. Two planes from the base were dispatched, as well. The object was never identified, and no explanation was ever given.

In 1959, the United States Army opened Army Air-Defense Command Post DF-30DC for Nike Missile air-defense system, Dallas-Fort Worth Defense Area in 1959. Duncanville was incorporated into BUIC I, a manual back-up interceptor control system implemented in 1962. BUIC I provided limited command-and-control capability in the event the SAGE system was disabled.

Duncanville AFS closed on 1 July 1964, when the 745th Radar Squadron transferred to Perrin AFS, TX (RP-78). Army Nike operations ended in 1969. After its closure, the Navy took over the housing units for Naval Air Station Dallas. Three acres were deeded to the City of Duncanville in late 1998 for development of a new swimming pool, landscaped walkway, jogging trail, a park entrance, and expanded parking.

== Air Force units and assignments ==
Units:

- 745th Aircraft Control and Warning Squadron, Activated 1 February 1953 at Duncanville AFS, TX

Transferred to Perrin Air Force Station, TX, 1 July 1964

Assignments:

- 33d Air Division, 1 February 1953
- Oklahoma City Air Defense Sector, 1 January 1960
- 4752d Air Defense Wing, 1 September 1961
- Oklahoma City Air Defense Sector, 25 June 1963 – 1 July 1964

== See also ==
- United States general surveillance radar stations
