= 740th Aircraft Control and Warning Squadron =

740th AC&W Squadron
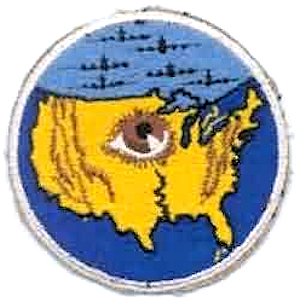
- Emblem of the 740th Aircraft Control and Warning Squadron
- Active: 1953–1962
- Country: United States
- Branch: United States Air Force
- Type: General Radar Surveillance and Ground Control Intercept (GCI)

The 740th Aircraft Control and Warning Squadron AKA 740th AC&W Squadron is an inactive United States Air Force unit. It was last assigned to the, Air Defense Command, 29th Air Division, Great Falls Montana, stationed at Ellsworth Air Force Base, South Dakota. It was discontinued on 15 August 1962.

The unit was a General Surveillance Radar and Ground Control Intercept (GCI)squadron providing for the air defense of the United States. Its call sign was Rollerskate and was the primary controller site for the 54th Fighter Interceptor Squadron (FIS), call sign Campaign. Rollerskate controllers guided three different Air Force fighters during intercepts while in operation. The F-84G Thunderjet, 1953–1954, F-86D Sabre Interceptor, (the Dog) 1954–1957 and the F-89J Scorpion, 1957–1960. Rollerskate operated MPS-7 Search Radar and MPS-14 Height Finder Radar. Rollerskate intercept controllers were distinguished for being the first GCI site to successfully intercept and technically shoot down Major General Jarred V. Crabb during a surprise evaluation of Rollerskate by senior CADF officers. Crabb, who had assumed command of Central Air Defense Force, was flying an F-102 when three of 13 F-86D's were successfully guided to the "SPLASH."

General Crabb was on his way to Great Falls AFB with orders for any operational unit to try an intercept him on his route.

Rollerskate knew they were to scramble one alert bird in an effort to intercept the general, what they didn't know was four additional flights of three were scrambled without their knowledge. As each flight of three were taking off, an Operational Readiness Inspection (ORI) team ordered the gate guard not to call the operations room until they entered the radar ops building. This left the officer on duty, Lt. Frank Imel and his Intercept Control Tech S/SGT Charles Diaz, to successfully control all the 13 Dogs. The evaluation officers were amazed by Lt. Imel and his crews performance during the mission. When General Crabb heard the three "SPLASHES" he decided to land at Ellsworth and by saying, "Bullsxxt, I want to see the camera film." After reviewing the gun camera film, General Crabb commended the three pilots and gave a special well done to Lt. Imel. General Crabb agreed he had in fact been shot down. Rollerskate had some of the best GCI controllers in ADC.

Lineage

- Activated as 740th Aircraft Control and Warning Squadron, 1 February 1953 Call sign Rollerskate

Inactivated, 15 August 1962

Assignments

- 31st Air Division, 1 February 1953
- 29th Air Division, 16 February 1953
- Minot Air Defense Sector, 1 January 1961 – 15 August 1962

Stations

- Rapid City AFB, South Dakota

Re-designated: Ellsworth AFB, South Dakota 1 June 1953 – 15 August 1962
