= Rochester Air Force Station =

US Air Force radar station

Rochester Air Force Station
- Part of Air Defense Command (ADC)

Site information
- Type: Air Force Station
- Controlled by: United States Air Force

Location
- Location of Rochester AFS, Minnesota
- Coordinates: 44°04′11″N 092°20′24″W

Site history
- Built: 1955
- In use: 1955-1957

Garrison information
- Garrison: 808th Aircraft Control and Warning Squadron

Rochester Air Force Station (ADC ID: M-101) is a closed United States Air Force General Surveillance Radar station. It is located 7.3 miles (11.7 km) east-northeast of Rochester, Minnesota. It was closed in 1957.

== History ==
Rochester Air Force Station was established as part of the planned deployment by Air Defense Command of forty-four Mobile radar stations across the United States to support the permanent Radar network established during the Cold War for air defense of the United States. This deployment had been projected to be operational by mid-1952. Funding, constant site changes, construction, and equipment delivery delayed deployment.

The 808th Aircraft Control and Warning Squadron was moved to Rochester on 1 September 1955 by the 31st Air Division, and it achieved operational status in 1956 with an AN/TPS-1D radar, and initially the station functioned as a Ground-Control Intercept (GCI) and warning station. As a GCI station, the squadron's role was to guide interceptor aircraft toward unidentified intruders picked up on the unit's radar scopes.

Due to budget cuts, it was removed from service and inactivated on 8 September 1957.

The radar station was excessed by the Air Force to GSA in July 1958, which conveyed the property in 1959 to the Minnesota State Dept of Health, Education, and Welfare. It was then conveyed to Penz Farms, Inc in the late 1960s or early 1970s. The facility consists of eight major buildings one mess hall, a large garage or shop, and two buildings possibly used for storage. Lesser buildings consist of a pump house for water supply and a small building, possibly used for sewer outfall monitoring. The large, earth-mounded water supply reservoir is still in use.

Penz Farms owned the property through May, 2017 including the buildings and water supply, with exception of the sewer-monitoring building, which was not being used. Two of the 'old' barracks had been remodeled and were briefly used as rental units. The other two barracks, mess hall, and storage buildings were used for farm-related activity and storage. The largest building on the complex was used as a shop/garage.

The site is generally cluttered with new, used, and 'junked' equipment. Olmsted County received the property in a tax-forfeiture on 1 June 2017.

== Air Force units and assignments ==
=== Units ===
- Constituted as the 808th Aircraft Control and Warning Squadron

Activated at Snelling AFS, Minnesota on 20 June 1953 (not manned or equipped)
Moved to Rochester AFS on 1 September 1955
Inactivated on 8 September 1957

=== Assignments ===
- 31st Air Division, 1 September 1955 – 9 September 1957

== See also ==
- List of USAF Aerospace Defense Command General Surveillance Radar Stations
