= 916th Aircraft Control and Warning Squadron =

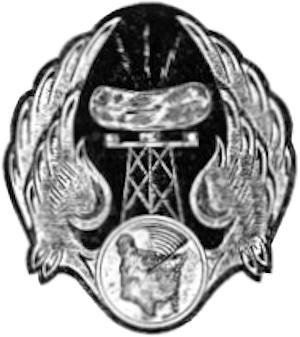
- Emblem of the 916th Aircraft Control and Warning Squadron
- Active: 1952-1961
- Country: United States
- Branch: United States Air Force
- Type: General Radar Surveillance

The 916th Aircraft Control and Warning Squadron is an inactive United States Air Force unit. It was last assigned to the Grand Forks Air Defense Sector, Air Defense Command, stationed at Beausejour Air Station, Manitoba, Canada. It was inactivated on 1 April 1963.

The unit was a General Surveillance Radar squadron providing for the air defense of North America.

== Lineage ==
- Constituted as the 916th Aircraft Control and Warning Squadron

Activated on 12 February 1952
Discontinued and inactivated on 1 October 1961

== Assignments ==
- 32d Air Division, 12 February 1952
- 31st Air Division, 1 December 1952
- 29th Air Division, 1 January 1959
- Grand Forks Air Defense Sector, 1 April 1959 – 1 October 1961

== Stations ==
- Grenier AFB, New Hampshire, 12 February 1952
- Beausejour AS, Manitoba, 1 December 1952 – 1 October 1961
