= Duncanville, Texas =

- City
- Nickname: City of Champions
- Location of Duncanville in Dallas County, Texas
- Coordinates: 32°38′05″N 96°54′24″W
- Country: United States
- State: Texas
- County: Dallas

Government
  - Type: Council-Manager

Area
  - Total: 11.21 sq mi (29.04 km^{2})
  - Land: 11.20 sq mi (29.01 km^{2})
  - Water: 0.012 sq mi (0.03 km^{2})
- Elevation: 715 ft (218 m)

Population (2020)
  - Total: 40,706
  - Density: 3,634/sq mi (1,403/km^{2})
- Time zone: UTC-6 (Central)
  - Summer (DST): UTC-5 (Central)
- ZIP codes: 75116, 75137, 75138
- Area codes: 214, 469, 945, 972
- FIPS code: 48-21628
- GNIS feature ID: 2410369
- Website: www.duncanvilletx.gov

Duncanville is a city in southwestern Dallas County, Texas, United States. Duncanville's population was 40,706 at the 2020 census. The city is part of the Best Southwest area, which includes Duncanville, Cedar Hill, DeSoto, and Lancaster.

== History ==
Settlement of the area began in 1845, when Illinois resident Crawford Trees purchased several thousand acres south of Camp Dallas. In 1880, the Chicago, Texas, and Mexican Central Railway reached the area and built Duncan Switch, named for a line foreman. Charles P. Nance, the community's first postmaster, renamed the settlement Duncanville in 1882. By the late 19th century, Duncanville was home to a dry-goods stores, a pharmacy, a domino parlor, and a school. Between 1904 and 1933, the population of Duncanville increased from 113 to more than 300.

During World War II, the Army Air Corps established a landing field for flight training on property near the present-day intersection of Main St and Wheatland Road.

Duncanville residents incorporated the city on August 2, 1947. During the postwar years, the military developed the Army's old landing field into the Duncanville Air Force Station, which was the headquarters for the four Nike-Hercules missile launch sites guarding Dallas/Fort Worth from Soviet bomber attack. It also housed the Air Force tracking radars for the region.

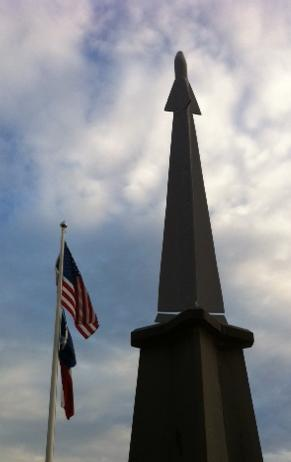
Monument commemorating NIKE missile base in Duncanville

Plaque describing NIKE base

When the town's population reached 5,000 in 1962, citizens adopted a home-rule charter with council-manager city government. Sometimes regarded as a "white flight" suburb in the 1960s and 1970s, the city is now known for its racial diversity. Its population increased from about 13,000 in 1970 to more than 31,000 in 1988.

=== Historic preservation ===
The Texas Historical Commission has designated the City of Duncanville as an official Main Street City.

Duncanville recognizes the importance of the former Duncanville Air Force Station, which closed on July 1, 1964, but the Army continued to operate the Nike Missile air defense operations until 1969, when the facility was turned over to the city. The WWII-era barracks and some other structures were initially repurposed for civic and community use. Over time, the buildings were systematically demolished, removing all signs of the historic base, but the history of the facility lives on in a monument that stands outside the library and community center.

The "stone igloo", a spring house originally located near the intersection of Center Street and Cedar Ridge Road, was preserved in a unique way. In the late 1960s or early 1970s, it was demolished, thereby producing a supply of rocks used to build a replica of the structure at a nearby park and paving the way for the construction of a neighborhood retail center.

Various pieces of the city's history are preserved at the Duncanville Historical Park, which is located on Wheatland Road in Armstrong Park on land that was once a part of the Duncanville Air Force Station. Historic buildings include the city's first Music Room.

== Geography ==
According to the United States Census Bureau, the city has a total area of 11.3 square miles (29 km^{2}), all land.

== Demographics ==
Historical population
Census	Pop.	Note	%±
1950	841		—
1960	3,774		348.8%
1970	14,105		273.7%
1980	27,781		97.0%
1990	35,748		28.7%
2000	36,081		0.9%
2010	38,524		6.8%
2020	40,706		5.7%
U.S. Decennial Census

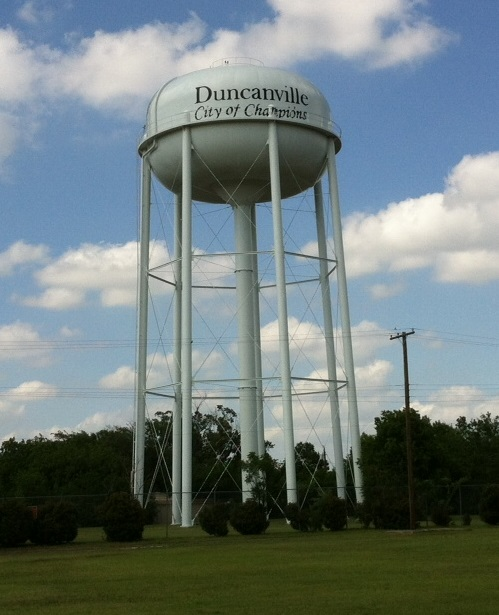
Water tower in the Fairmeadows neighborhood of Duncanville, depicting the city slogan

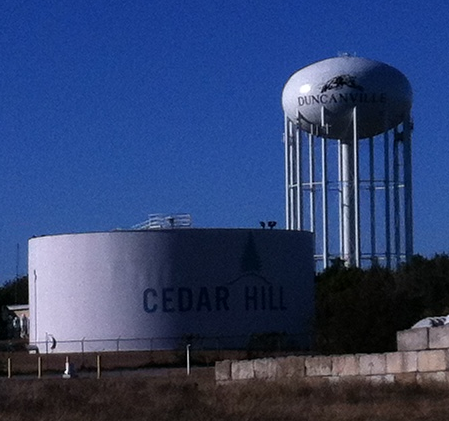
Water towers on the southern edge of Duncanville, northern edge of Cedar Hill

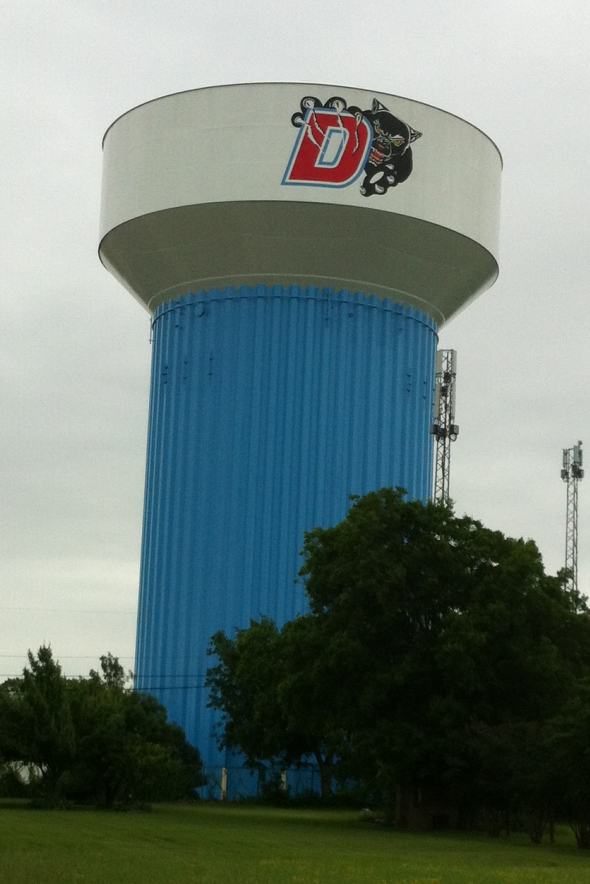
Water tower on east side of Clark Road

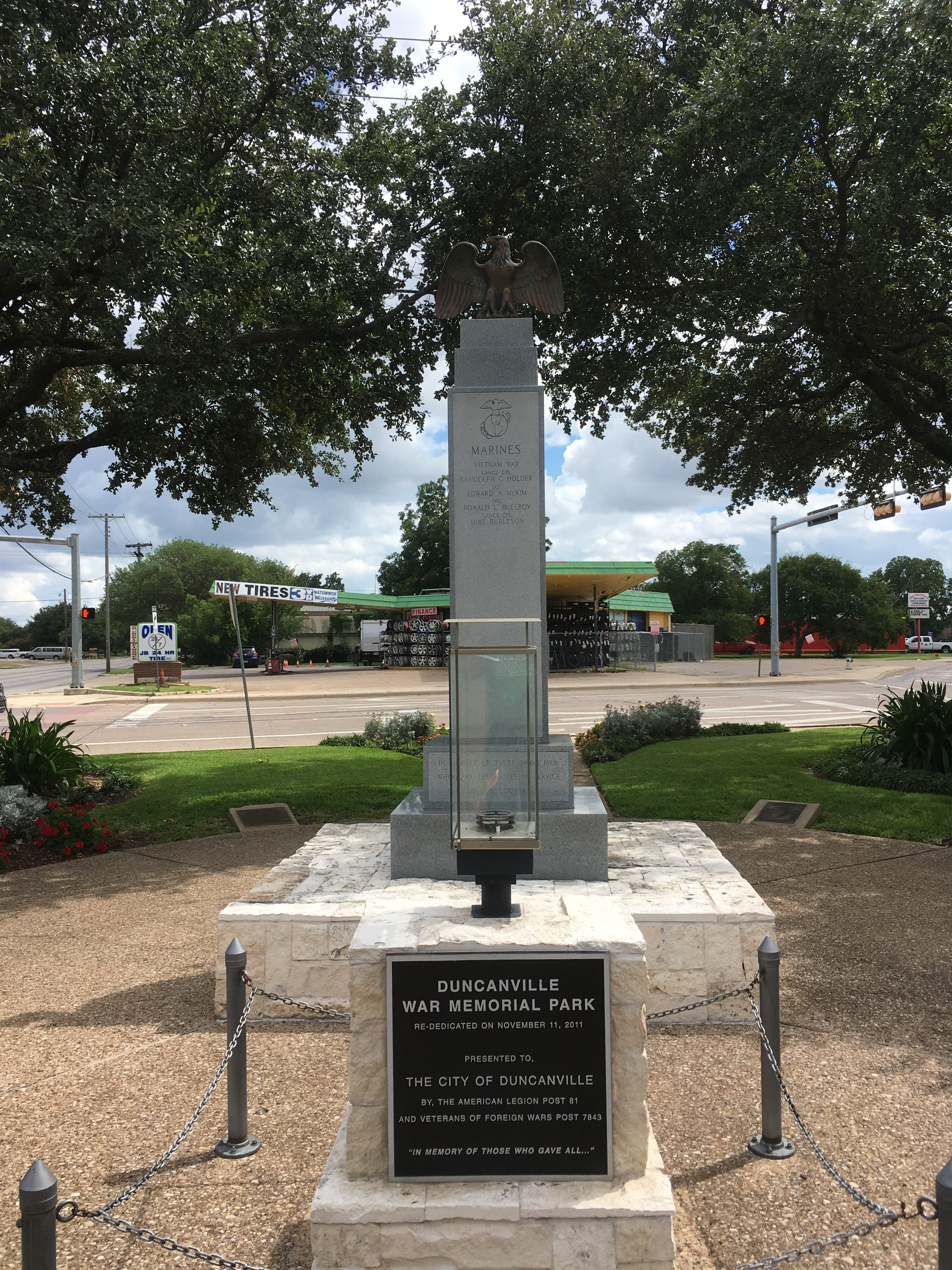
War memorial monument

=== 2020 census ===
As of the 2020 census, Duncanville had a population of 40,706. The median age was 37.2 years. 25.8% of residents were under the age of 18 and 15.5% of residents were 65 years of age or older. For every 100 females there were 92.4 males, and for every 100 females age 18 and over there were 88.6 males age 18 and over.

100.0% of residents lived in urban areas, while 0.0% lived in rural areas.

There were 13,687 households in Duncanville, of which 38.7% had children under the age of 18 living in them. Of all households, 47.9% were married-couple households, 15.5% were households with a male householder and no spouse or partner present, and 31.0% were households with a female householder and no spouse or partner present. About 20.3% of all households were made up of individuals and 9.0% had someone living alone who was 65 years of age or older. There were 14,227 housing units, of which 3.8% were vacant. The homeowner vacancy rate was 1.2% and the rental vacancy rate was 5.6%.

Racial composition as of the 2020 census
Race	Number	Percent
White	12,082	29.7%
Black or African American	12,262	30.1%
American Indian and Alaska Native	802	2.0%
Asian	586	1.4%
Native Hawaiian and Other Pacific Islander	28	0.1%
Some other race	7,838	19.3%
Two or more races	7,108	17.5%
Hispanic or Latino (of any race)	18,166	44.6%

== Government ==
Duncanville City Hall is located at 203 E. Wheatland Road. Most city services are located in this facility, which also includes the Duncanville Recreation Center featuring meeting rooms, a double gymnasium, and an indoor walking track. Armstrong Park is also located next to City Hall. Duncanville has three walking trails, 17 city parks, and many other recreation spaces for team sports.

U.S. Route 67 runs through the eastern portion of Duncanville. Interstate 20 passes through its northern portion.

The United States Postal Service operates the Duncanville Post Office.

The Duncanville Public Library is located at 201 James Collins Boulevard.

The city of Duncanville is a voluntary member of the North Central Texas Council of Governments, the purpose of which is to coordinate individual and collective local governments and facilitate regional solutions, eliminate unnecessary duplication, and enable joint decisions.

=== Politics ===
Duncanville city vote by party in Presidential elections
Year	Democratic	Republican	Third Parties
2020	65.95% 10,580	32.64% 5,236	1.41% 226

== Education ==
Duncanville is served by the Duncanville Independent School District.

The Duncanville ISD portion is zoned to Duncanville High School, which enrolls about 3,750 students annually, with over 4,000 students during the 2010–2011 school year. At about 900,000 square feet (84,000 m^{2}), the DHS campus is the largest in Texas, the largest in the nation, and the largest in the world in terms of physical size. In total, 13 of the 17 schools in the district are rated exemplary or recognized by the Texas Education Agency, and the district's ratings continue to outperform those of the surrounding districts (Cedar Hill, DeSoto, Lancaster, Dallas, Grand Prairie). They also outperform many of the school districts throughout the Dallas–Fort Worth area.

Duncanville is also home to the administrative offices of Advantage Academy.

Dallas County residents are zoned to Dallas College (formerly Dallas County Community College or DCCCD).

== Notable people ==
- Greg Abbott, Texas governor, a 1976 graduate of Duncanville High School.
- Brigetta Barrett, high jumper, silver medalist in 2012 London Olympics and 2013 world championships
- Tamika Catchings, WNBA all-star, graduated from DHS in 1997.
- Barry Foster, former running back for the Pittsburgh Steelers
- Cyrus Gray, Kansas City Chiefs running back
- Joe Greene, professional football player lived in Duncanville
- Ron Holland (basketball) (born 2005), professional basketball player for the Detroit Pistons
- Perry Jones, professional basketball player for the Oklahoma City Thunder
- Greg Ostertag is a 1991 graduate and basketball player for Duncanville High School.
- Dashaun Phillips, American football cornerback, was born in and lived in Duncanville.
- Kenneth Lee Pike, linguist and author, lived in Duncanville for many years, and was nominated for the Nobel Peace Prize.
- Ennis Rakestraw Jr. (born 2002), professional football player for the Detroit Lions
- Jon Randall, musician
- Steven Romo (journalist), news anchor, reporter, and writer, grew up in Duncanville.
- Elliott Smith, singer, lived in Duncanville as a child.
