= 24th Expeditionary Air Support Operations Squadron =

- Active: 1946–1948; 1953–1954; 1972–1977; 1988–1999
- Country: United States
- Branch: United States Air Force
- Role: Air Support Operations
- Part of: Air Combat Command
- Garrison/HQ: Al Udeid Air Base
- Decorations: Air Force Outstanding Unit Award

Insignia
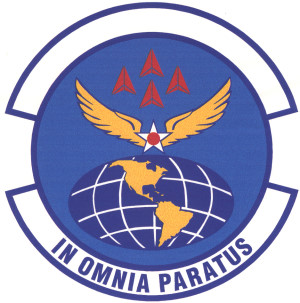
- 24th Expeditionary Air Support Operations Squadron emblem (approved 5 September 1995)

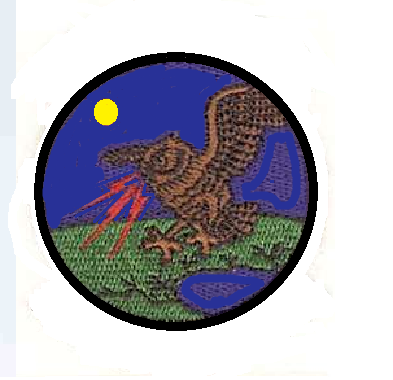
- 630th Radar Squadron emblem (1972–1977)

The United States Air Force's 24th Expeditionary Air Support Operations Squadron is a combat support unit. The 24th provides tactical command and control of airpower assets to the Joint Forces Air Component Commander and Joint Forces Land Component Commander for combat operations. It was first activated in 1946 in the Panama Canal Zone as the 630th Aircraft Control Squadron, but was inactivated two years later. It was activated again in 1953 as the 630th Aircraft Control and Warning Squadron, a Tactical Air Command radar unit that replaced an Air National Guard unit mobilized for the Korean War. It transferred to Air Defense Command, which inactivated it the following year.

The squadron was activated again in 1972 as the 630th Radar Squadron and used military and Federal Aviation Administration radars to provide surveillance in the Gulf of Mexico. In 1989, it returned to its original area in Panama, where it focused on counter-drug operations under various designations until the Air Force withdrew its forces in Panama in 1999. It was converted to provisional status as an expeditionary unit in 2009.

== History ==
=== Defense of the Panama Canal ===
The squadron was first activated in 1946 in the Panama Canal Zone as the 630th Aircraft Control Squadron, an aircraft direction and control squadron, collocated with its parent 530th Aircraft Control and Warning Group at Quarry Heights, Panama Canal Zone, when the radar detection mission previously performed by the Signal Corps was combined with the direction mission performed by Air Corps units. The group performed the aircraft detection, warning and control mission for the Canal Zone for Sixth Air Force (later Caribbean Air Command). The squadron was inactivated in 1948 as the USAF reduced the size of its forces in the Caribbean.

=== Mobile aircraft control unit ===
The squadron was redesignated the 630th Aircraft Control and Warning Squadron and activated at Alexandria Air Force Base, Louisiana when the 532d Tactical Control Group replaced the 157th Tactical Control Group, a Missouri Air National Guard unit that had been mobilized for the Korean War. The squadron replaced the 133d Aircraft Control and Warning Squadron. While at Alexandria, the squadron was attached to the 629th Aircraft Control and Warning Squadron. It moved to Camp Edwards, Massachusetts in January 1954 to join the 532d Group headquarters. At Camp Edwards, the 532d was transferred from Tactical Air Command to Air Defense Command (ADC) as the 532d Aircraft Control and Warning Group, Mobile. The group and squadron were inactivated before the end of the year.

=== Shared FAA radar ===
The squadron was redesignated the 630th Radar Squadron and activated at the Federal Aviation Administration's Houston Air Route Traffic Control Center in August 1972 as part of the Southern Air Defense System (SADS) In 1969, the inadequacy of the radar coverage to the south of the United States were dramatically illustrated when a Cuban Air Force MiG-17 went undetected before it landed at Homestead Air Force Base, Florida and two years later, an Antonov An-24 similarly arrived unannounced at New Orleans International Airport. As a result, ADC established SADS with the squadron operating a manual control center at the Houston ARTCC and added radars to supplement the existing Federal Aviation Administration coverage in the area, which were staffed by the operating locations of the squadron. The squadron was inactivated at the end of 1977.

=== Return to Panama ===
The squadron returned to its earlier designation as the 630th Aircraft Control and Warning Squadron in 1988 and was activated on 1 April at Howard Air Force Base, Panama. It was redesignated the 630th Radar Squadron the following year. The unit focused on counter drug operations. Its mission changed in 1993, when it became the 630th Air Operations Squadron and in 1994, it was renumbered to its parent wing's number. It was finally inactivated when the USAF shut down its operations in Panama in conjunction with the turnover of the former Canal Zone to Panama.

=== Expeditionary unit ===
On 12 February 2009, the squadron was converted to provisional status as the 24th Expeditionary Air Support Operations Squadron and assigned to Air Combat Command to activate or inactivate as needed for contingency operations.

== Lineage ==
- Constituted as the 630th Aircraft Control Squadron on 11 September 1946

Activated on 15 October 1946
Inactivated on 16 April 1948

- Redesignated 630th Aircraft Control and Warning Squadron on 15 October 1953

Activated on 1 November 1953
Inactivated on 8 September 1954

- Redesignated 630th Radar Squadron on 18 July 1972

Activated on 1 August 1972
Inactivated on 31 December 1977

- Redesignated 630th Aircraft Control and Warning Squadron on 8 January 1988

Activated on 1 April 1988
Redesignated 630 Radar Squadron on 1 December 1989
Redesignated 630th Air Operations Squadron on 26 July 1993
Redesignated 24th Air Support Operations Squadron on 1 July 1994
Inactivated on 1 June 1999

- Redesignated 24th Expeditionary Air Support Operations Squadron and converted to provisional status on 12 February 2009

=== Assignments ===
- 530th Aircraft Control and Warning Group, 15 October 1946 – 16 April 1948
- Ninth Air Force, 1 November 1953 (attached to 629th Aircraft Control and Warning Squadron, until 7 January 1954, then to 532d Tactical Control Group)
- 532d Aircraft Control and Warning Group, Mobile, 15 February–8 September 1954
- 20th Air Division, 1 August 1972 – 31 December 1977
- USAF Southern Air Division, 1 April 1988
- 24th Composite Wing, 1 January 1989
- Air Forces Panama, 15 February 1991
- 24th Operations Group, 11 February 1992
- 24th Wing, 26 July 1993
- 24th Operations Group, 27 July 1998 – 1 June 1999
- Air Combat Command to activate or inactivate as needed at any time on or after 12 February 2009

=== Stations ===
- Quarry Heights, Panama Canal Zone, 15 October 1946 – 16 April 1948
- Alexandria Air Force Base, Louisiana, 1 November 1953
- Camp Edwards, Massachusetts, 8 January–8 September 1954
- Houston Air Route Traffic Control Center, Texas, 1 August 1972 – 31 December 1977

Operating Locations:

Odessa, Texas (Z-229) (Operating Location A) 32°33′15″N 102°25′40″W
Olton, Texas (Z-242) (Operating Location B) 27°29′56″N 098°58′08″W
Ellington Air Force Base, Texas (Z-240) (Operating Location C) 29°36′56″N 095°10′23″W
Lackland Air Force Base, Texas (Z-241) (Operating Location D) 29°23′16″N 098°37′59″W
Slidell, Louisiana (Z-246) (Operating Location E) 30°20′53″N 089°46′46″W
Lake Charles Air Force Station, Louisiana (Z-246) (Operating Location F) 30°11′03″N 093°10′33″W
Dauphin Island Air Force Station, Alabama (Z-249) (Operating Location G) 30°15′00″N 088°04′40″W

- Howard Air Force Base (later Howard Air Base), Panama, 1 April 1988 – 1 June 1999
