= 688th Aircraft Control and Warning Squadron =

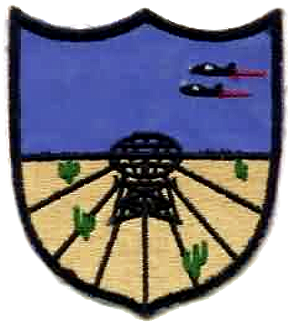
- Emblem of the 688th Aircraft Control and Warning Squadron
- Active: 1953-1968
- Country: United States
- Branch: United States Air Force
- Type: General Radar Surveillance

The 688th Aircraft Control and Warning Squadron is an inactive United States Air Force unit. It was last assigned to the 31st Air Division, Aerospace Defense Command, stationed at Amarillo Air Force Base, Texas. It was inactivated on 8 September 1968.

The unit was a General Surveillance Radar squadron providing for the air defense of the United States.

== Lineage ==
- Activated as 688th Aircraft Control and Warning Squadron

Activated on 1 October 1953
Discontinued and inactivated on 8 September 1968

== Assignments ==
- 25th Air Division, 1 October 1953
- 33d Air Division, 26 December 1953
- Albuquerque Air Defense Sector, 1 January 1960
- Oklahoma City Air Defense Sector, 15 September 1960
- 4752d Air Defense Wing, 1 September 1961
- Oklahoma City Air Defense Sector, 25 June 1963
- 31st Air Division, 1 April 1966 – 8 September 1968

== Stations ==
- Geiger Field, Washington, 1 October 1953
- Tinker AFB, Oklahoma, 26 December 1953
- Amarillo AFB, Texas, 1 October 1954 – 8 September 1968
