= 746th Aircraft Control and Warning Squadron =

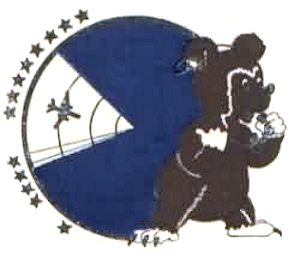
- Emblem of the 746th Aircraft Control and Warning Squadron
- Active: 1953-1968
- Country: United States
- Branch: United States Air Force
- Type: General Radar Surveillance

The 746th Aircraft Control and Warning Squadron is an inactive United States Air Force unit. It was last assigned to the 31st Air Division, Aerospace Defense Command, stationed at Oklahoma City Air Force Station, Oklahoma. It was inactivated on 8 September 1968.

The unit was a General Surveillance Radar squadron providing for the air defense of the United States.

Lineage

- Activated as 746th Aircraft Control and Warning Squadron, 1 February 1953

Discontinued on 8 September 1968

Assignments

- 33d Air Division, 1 February 1953
- Oklahoma City Air Defense Sector, 1 January 1960
- 4752d Air Defense Wing, 1 September 1961
- Oklahoma City Air Defense Sector, 25 June 1963
- 31st Air Division, 1 April 1966 – 8 September 1968

Stations

- Tinker AFB, Oklahoma, 1 February 1953
- Oklahoma City AFS, Oklahoma, 1 July 1956 – 8 September 1968
