= 733d Aircraft Control and Warning Squadron =

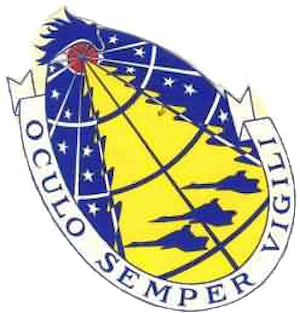
- Emblem of the 733d Aircraft Control and Warning Squadron
- Active: 1956-1963
- Country: United States
- Branch: United States Air Force
- Type: General Radar Surveillance

The 733d Aircraft Control and Warning Squadron is an inactive United States Air Force unit. It was last assigned to the Oklahoma City Air Defense Sector, Aerospace Defense Command, stationed at Eagle Pass Air Force Station, Texas. It was inactivated on 1 August 1963.

The unit was a General Surveillance Radar squadron providing for the air defense of the United States.

Lineage

- Activated as 733d Aircraft Control and Warning Squadron on 8 September 1956

Discontinued on 1 August 1963

Assignments

- 33d Air Division, 8 September 1956
- Oklahoma City Air Defense Sector, 1 January 1960
- 4752d Air Defense Wing, 1 September 1961
- Oklahoma City Air Defense Sector, 25 June-1 August 1963

Stations

- Oklahoma City AFS, Oklahoma, 8 September 1956
- Eagle Pass AFS, Texas, 3 July 1957 – 1 August 1963
