= Oklahoma City Air Defense Sector =

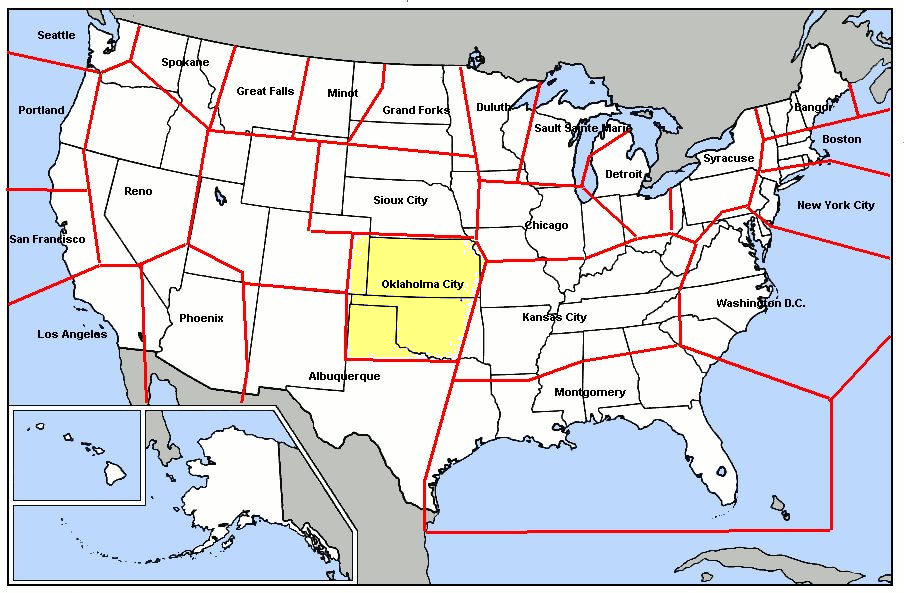
- Oklahoma City Air Defense Sector Area of Responsibility 1963-1966
- Active: 1960–1961; 1963–1966
- Country: United States
- Branch: United States Air Force
- Role: Air defense

Insignia
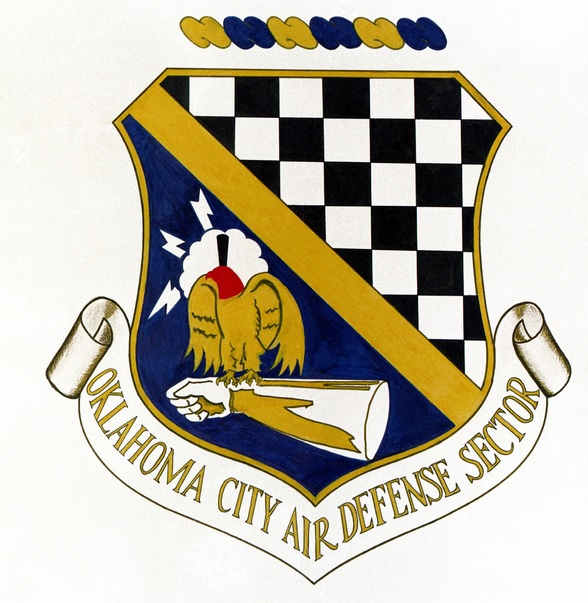
- Oklahoma City Air Defense Sector emblem

Oklahoma City Air Force Station was still active in 1969. I was stationed there during that year. It was a centralized manual system with several air force sites tracking and reporting air traffic which was plotted on a two story map of the southern US border with grease pencils.

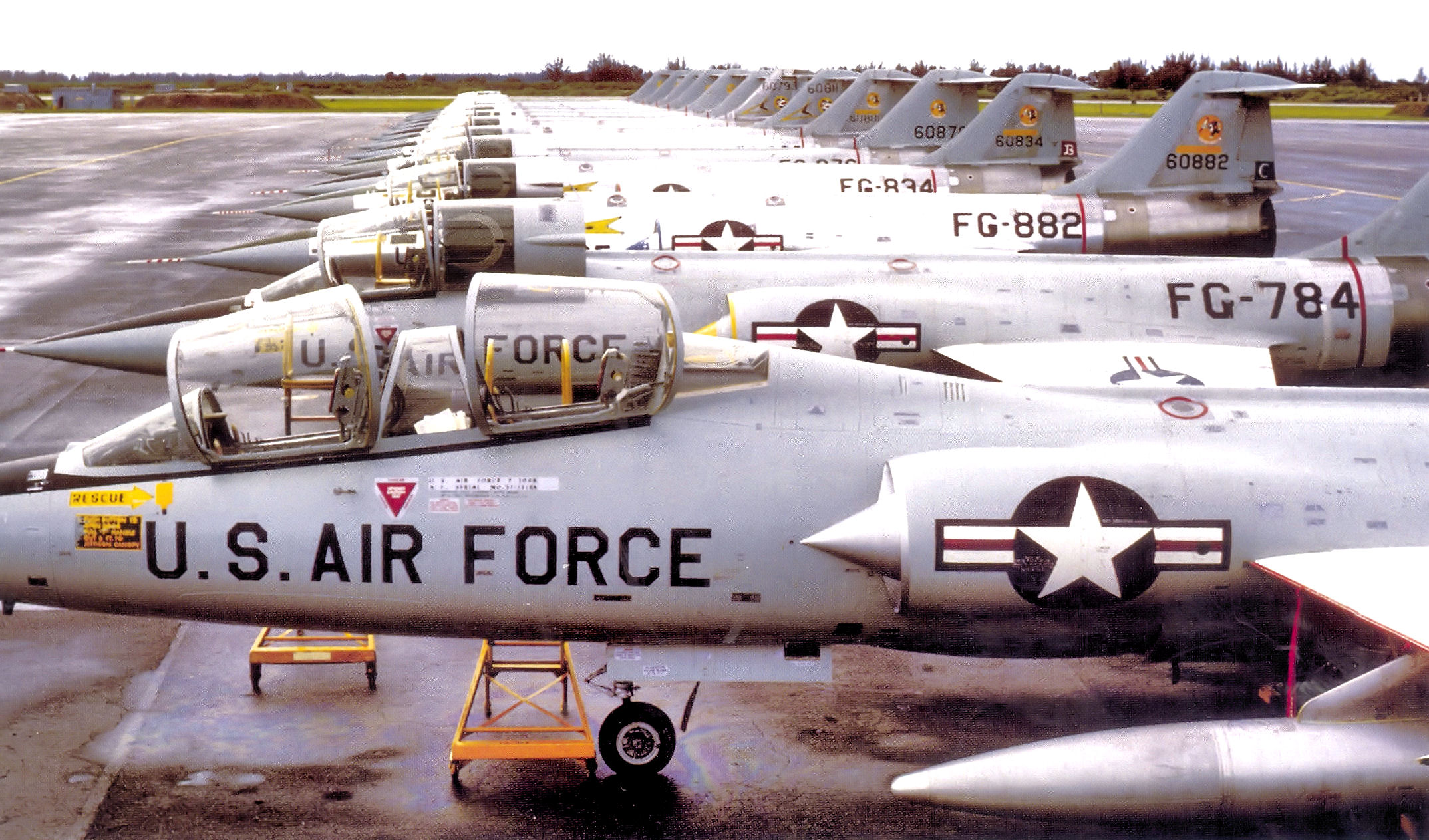
331st Fighter-Interceptor Squadron Lockheed F-104 Starfighters (Note: Aircraft are Lockheed F-104A-15-LO Starfighters from Webb Air Force Base, Texas on temporaty duty to Homestead Air Force Base, Florida in February 1964. Serials identified are 56-0784 56-0882 and 56-0834.)

The Oklahoma City Air Defense Sector is an inactive United States Air Force organization. Its last assignment was with the Air Defense Command's 29th Air Division at Oklahoma City Air Force Station, Oklahoma. The sector was responsible for air defense of a region encompassing several states in the central United States. It was one of the few air defense sectors never upgraded to the Semi-Automatic Ground Environment.

== History ==
The Oklahoma City Air Defense Sector was organized at Oklahoma City Air Force Station (Note: At the time the sector was active, Oklahoma City Air Force Station was a separate Air Force Installation. In 1970, it was assigned to tinker Air Force Base as an off base installation. Mueller, p. 547 It is currently part of Tinker.) in 1960 as a manual sector (Note: "Manual" sectors were not equipped with Semi-Automatic Ground Environment computers.) in a reorganization stemming from the inactivation of Central Air Defense Force. (Note: The map of the sector's area of responsibility depicts its area of responsibility from 1963 to 1966. From 1960 to 1961 its area consisted of central Oklahoma, eastern Texas, southern Arkansas, and Louisiana west of New Orleans, Cornett & Johnson, p. 31.) It was discontinued 1 September 1961 and its personnel and equipment transferred to the 4752d Air Defense Wing, which was designated, organized and assigned to the 32nd Air Division the same day. This change was short-lived, for the 4752nd Wing was discontinued and replaced once again by the sector on 25 June 1963, although with fewer units assigned,as a result of the realignment and expansion of the 29th Air Division. The sector operated Manual Air Defense Control Center P-86, later redesignated Manual Combat Center MCC-11, and later NORAD Sector Combat Center (Manual).

The sector was inactivated and transferred its mission, personnel and equipment to the 31st Air Division, which was simultaneously organized on 1 April 1966.

=== Lineage ===
- Established as Oklahoma City Air Defense Sector

Activated on 1 January 1960
Discontinued on 1 September 1961
Organized on 25 June 1963
Discontinued and inactivated on 1 April 1966

=== Assignments ===
- 33d Air Division, 1 January 1960
- 32nd Air Division, 1 July 1961 – 1 July 1961
- 29th Air Division, 25 June 1963 – 1 April 1966

=== Stations ===
- Oklahoma City Air Force Station, Oklahomna, 1 January 1960 – 1 September 1961
- Oklahoma City Air Force Station, Oklahoma, 25 June 1963 – 1 April 1966

=== Components ===
==== Interceptor squadrons ====
- 58th Fighter-Interceptor Squadron, 15 September – 25 December 1960

Walker Air Force Base, New Mexico

- 331st Fighter-Interceptor Squadron, 15 September 1960 – 1 September 1961, 25 June 1963 – 1 April 1966

Webb Air Force Base, Texas

- 332d Fighter-Interceptor Squadron, 1 January – 1 September 1960

England Air Force Base, Louisiana

==== Radar squadrons ====
- 653d Aircraft Control and Warning Squadron, 1 January 1960 – 1 August 1963

England Air Force Base, Louisiana

- 683d Aircraft Control and Warning Squadron, 15 September 1960 – 25 June 1963

Sweetwater Air Force Station, Texas

- 685th Aircraft Control and Warning Squadron, 15 September 1960 – 1 August 1963

Las Cruces Air Force Station, New Mexico

- 686th Aircraft Control and Warning Squadron, 15 September 1960 – 1 August 1963

Walker Air Force Base, New Mexico

- 687th Aircraft Control and Warning Squadron, 15 September 1960 – 25 June 1963

West Mesa Air Force Station, New Mexico

- 688th Aircraft Control and Warning Squadron, 15 September 1960 – 25 June 1963

Amarillo Air Force Base, Texas

- 697th Aircraft Control and Warning Squadron, 15 September 1960 – 1 August 1963

Pyote Air Force Station, Texas

- 703d Aircraft Control and Warning Squadron, Arkansas, 1 September 1961 – 1 April 1966

Texarkana Air Force Station

- 732d Aircraft Control and Warning Squadron, 15 September 1960 – 1 August 1963

Ozona Air Force Station, Texas

- 733d Aircraft Control and Warning Squadron, 1 September 1961 – 1 August 1963

Eagle Pass Air Force Station, Texas

- 741st Aircraft Control and Warning Squadron, 1 September 1961 – 25 June 1963

Lackland Air Force Base, Texas

- 742d Aircraft Control and Warning Squadron, 1 January 1960 – 1 June 1961

Zapata Air Force Station, Texas

- 745th Aircraft Control and Warning Squadron, Texas, 1 January 1960 – 25 June 1963

Duncanville Air Force Station

- 746th Aircraft Control and Warning Squadron, 1 January 1960 – 25 June 1963

Oklahoma City Air Force Station, Oklahoma

- 747th Aircraft Control and Warning Squadron, 1 January 1960 – 25 June 1963

Ellington Field, Texas

- 768th Aircraft Control and Warning Squadron, 15 September 1960 – 1 June 1961

Moriarty Air Force Station, New Mexico

- 769th Aircraft Control and Warning Squadron, 15 September 1960 – 1 July 1961

Continental Divide Air Force Station, New Mexico

- 811th Aircraft Control and Warning Squadron, 8 April 1956 – 30 April 1957; 1 January 1960 – 1 June 1961

Port Isabel Air Force Station, Texas

- 813th Aircraft Control and Warning Squadron, 1 January 1960 – 1 August 1963

Rockport Air Force Station, Texas

- 814th Aircraft Control and Warning Squadron, 1 January 1960 – 1 February 1961

Killeen Air Force Station, Texas

- 815th Aircraft Control and Warning Squadron, 1 January 1960 – 1 June 1961

Lufkin Air Force Station, Texas

== See also ==
- Aerospace Defense Command Fighter Squadrons
- List of MAJCOM wings
- List of United States Air Force aircraft control and warning squadrons
- List of USAF Aerospace Defense Command General Surveillance Radar Stations
