= 653d Aircraft Control and Warning Squadron =

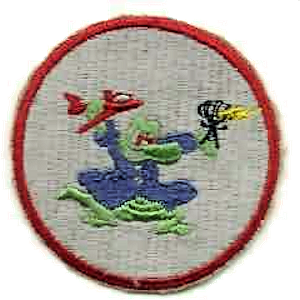
- Emblem of the 630th Radar Squadron
- Active: 1949-1952, 1953-1963
- Country: United States
- Branch: United States Air Force
- Type: General Radar Surveillance

The 653d Aircraft Control and Warning Squadron is an inactive United States Air Force unit. It was last assigned to the Oklahoma City Air Defense Sector, Air Defense Command, stationed at England Air Force Base, Louisiana. It was inactivated on 1 August 1963.

The unit was a General Surveillance Radar squadron providing for the air defense of the United States.

Lineage

- Established as 653d Aircraft Control and Warning Squadron

Activated on 8 December 1949
Inactivated on 6 February 1952

- Activated on 18 June 1953

Inactivated on 1 August 1963

Assignments

- 540th Aircraft Control and Warning Group, 8 December 1949 - 6 February 1952
- 33d Air Division, 18 June 1953
- Oklahoma City Air Defense Sector, 1 January 1960
- 4752d Air Defense Wing, 1 September 1961
- Oklahoma City Air Defense Sector, 25 June – 1 August 1963

Stations

- Stewart AFB, NY, 8 December 1949 - 6 February 1952
- Tinker AFB, OK, 18 June 1953
- Alexandria AFB, LA, 1 November 1954 (renamed England AFB 23 June 1955) – 1 August 1963
