= United States general surveillance radar stations =

United States general surveillance radar stations include Army and USAF stations of various US air defense networks (in reverse chronological order):

- Joint Surveillance System (JSS), with radar stations controlled by joint FAA/USAF ROCCs beginning in 1980
- SAGE radar stations, for the Semi-Automatic Ground Environment network prior to the JSS (the 1st SAGE squadrons were designated in 1958)
- Alaska Ring radar net, the radar stations of Alaskan Air Command
- Permanent System radar stations, the Air Defense Command manual network of radar stations prior to deployment of SAGE
- Pinetree Line, a series of radar stations located across southern Canada at about the 50th parallel north.
- Lashup Radar Network radar stations, the radar stations deployed 1950-2 when the "Radar Fence" Plan was not approved
- Temporary radar net, the "five-station radar net" established in 1948
- Army Radar Stations, World War II installations of the Aircraft Warning Service with radars (cf. filter centers, Ground Observer Corps stations, etc.)

By usage:

- RBS Express sites, temporary stations for Radar Bomb Scoring trains which had AN/MPS-9 general surveillance radars
- Nike Integrated Fire Control sites, with general surveillance radars used to acquire the target (i.e., defense acquisition radar, "ACQR", such as the General Electric AN/MPQ-43 High Power Acquisition Radar)
- Army Air Defense Command Posts, which used general surveillance radars for coordinating fire from several Nike batteries (e.g., FAA Air Route Surveillance Radars at JUSS radar stations like Fort Heath)
