= List of United States Air Force aircraft control and warning squadrons =

This Article is a list of United States Air Force aircraft control and warning squadrons active, inactive, and historical. The purpose of an aircraft control and warning squadron is to provide an airborne radar picket to detect vessels, planes, and vehicles before they enter an area of operations, as well as providing command and control in an engagement by directing aircraft strikes. Additionally they may be used to carry out surveillance, including over ground targets.

== Site codes ==
=== Sites within the United States ===
- DC-xx Semi-Automatic Ground Environment (SAGE) Direction Center/Combat Center.
- F-xx Alaskan air defense sites.
- H-0x Hawaiian air defense sites.
- L-xx Original Air Defense Command (ADC) 1946 "Lashup" Radar Network of temporary sites to provide detection at designated important locations using radar sets left over from World War II.
- LP-xx "Lashup" site which was incorporated into the first ADC permanent radar network in 1949.
- P-xx Original 75 permanent stations established in 1949.
- RP-xx Sites that replaced a permanent 1949 station.
- M-xx 1952 Phase I Mobile Radar station.
- SM-xx 1955 Phase II Mobile Radar Station.
- TM-xx 1959 Phase III Mobile station.
- TT-x Texas Towers, radar tower rigs off the East Coast of the United States, named because of their resemblance to oil drilling rigs in the Gulf of Mexico.
- Z-xx NORAD designation for sites after 31 July 1963. P, M, SM, and TM stations active after that date retained their numbers, but were designated "Z-xx".

=== Sites outside the United States ===
- C-xx ADC and Royal Canadian Air Force (RCAF) manned sites on the Canadian Pinetree Line.
- G-xx Sites in Greenland established by Northeast Air Command (NEAC) reassigned to ADC in 1957. became N Sites, then C Sites, retaining their numbers.
- H-xx Air defense sites in Iceland.
- J-xx Sites in Japan. (includes main bases)
- K-xx Sites in Korea. (includes main bases)
- N-xx Pinetree Line sites in Newfoundland. Became C Sites, retaining their numbers. Reassigned from NEAC to ADC in 1957.
- R-xx At least two sites in the Southern Pacific.
- W-xx sites in Spain.
- Y-xx sites in Morocco.

== Aircraft control and warning squadrons ==
Squadron	Emblem	Location	Perm. ID	Notes
601st Aircraft Control and Warning Squadron		Rothwesten AS, Germany; Pforzheim AS, Germany; Rothwesten AS, Germany		1 Dec 1948-31 Jul 1955; 31 Jul 1955-20 Jul 1956; 20 Jul 1956-18 Nov 1960; Was 601st Tac Control Sq, to 601st Tac Control Sq
602d Aircraft Control and Warning Squadron		Darmstadt AS, Germany; Birkenfeld, Germany; Giebelstadt, Germany		22 Nov 1948–ca. 1949 ca. 1949-unknown unknown-after Nov 1968; Was 602d Tac Control Sq, to 602d Tac Control Sq. Became 602 Air Control Sqd in 1991 when it reactivated at Wueschheim Air Station, Germany (former GLCM site) near Hahn Air Base.
603d Aircraft Control and Warning Squadron		Neustadt-Aisch Airport, Germany		1 Dec 1945–1946; To 603d Tac Control Sq
604th Aircraft Control and Warning Squadron		Freising, Germany		1 Dec 1948-1 Dec 1957; Was 604th Tac Control Sq
606th Aircraft Control and Warning Squadron		Biggs Field, TX; Shaw AFB, SC; Pope AFB, NC; Shaw AFB, SC; Pusan AB, South Korea; Taegu AB, South Korea; Pusan AB, South Korea; Pyongtaek AS, South Korea; Kimpo AB, South Korea; Kangnung Adme, South Korea	K-1; K-2; K-1; K-6; K-14; K-18	30 Jan 1946-13 Jan 1947; 13 Jan 1947 – Feb 1948; Feb 1948 – Dec 1949; Dec 1949-27 Aug 1950 ca. Sep 1950–ca. 3 Oct 1950 ca. 14 Oct 1950–ca. 16 Dec 1950 ca. 16 Dec 1950 – Mar 1951; Mar 1951 – Jun 1951; Jun 1951 – Oct 1954; Oct 1954-1 Oct 1957; Was 606th Tac Control Sq, to 606th Tac Control Sq
607th Aircraft Control and Warning Squadron		Biggs Field, TX; Myrtle Beach AFB, SC; Turner AFB, GA; Pusan AB, South Korea; Kimpo AB, South Korea; Pusan AB, South Korea; Yoju Airstrip, South Korea; Pyongtaek AS, South Korea; Malmstrom AFB, MT	K-1; K-14; K-1; K-45; K-6	30 Jan 1946-13 Jan 1947; 13 Jan 1947-28 Oct 1947; 28 Oct 1947 – Aug 1950 ca. Sep 1950–ca. 3 Oct 1950 ca. 10 Oct 1950–ca. 10 Dec 1950 ca. 10 Dec 1950 – Mar 1951; Mar 1951 – Mar 1952; Mar 1952-1 Oct 1957; 8 Dec 57-29 Jul 1958; Was 607th Tac Control Sq, to 607th Tac Control Sq
608th Aircraft Control and Warning Squadron		Biggs AFB, TX; March AFB, CA; Taegu AB, South Korea; Kangnung Adme, South Korea; Seoul, South Korea; Kimpo AB, South Korea; Paengyong-do Afld, North Korea; Ch'o-do island, South Korea; Chinchon-ni, South Korea	K-2; K-18; K-16; K-14; K-53; K-54	30 Jan 1946-17 Jan 1947; 17 Jan 1947-28 Mar 1949; 21 Nov 1951 – Nov 1951; Nov 1951 – Oct 1952; Oct 1952 – Dec 1954; Dec 1954 – Dec 1956; Dec 1956 – Feb 1957; Feb 1957-1 Oct 1957; Was 608th Acft Control Sq, to 608th Tac Control Sq
609th Aircraft Control and Warning Squadron		March AFB, CA; Dobbins AFB, GA; Eufaula AFS, AL	TM-199	29 Aug 1947-28 Mar 1949; 8 Dec 1957-15 Jul 1958; 15 Jul 1958-1 Oct 1959; Was 609th Tac Control Sq (inactive), to 609th Radar Sq
610th Aircraft Control and Warning Squadron		Itazuke AB, Japan; Saitozako, Japan; Itazuke AB, Japan; Seburi Yama AS, Japan; Itazuke Air Base, Japan	J-13 J-13 J-13	15 Jul 1946-15 Jul 1948; 15 Jul 1948-20 Oct 1951; 20 Oct 1951-8 Sep 1956; 8 Sep 1956-6 Jan 1958; 6 Jan 1958-8 Sep 1960; To 610th Air Control Flt
611th Aircraft Control and Warning Squadron		Mineoka, Japan		unknown-8 Sep 1960
612th Aircraft Control and Warning Squadron		Kirtland AFB, NM; Ajo AFS, AZ; Gila Bend AFS, AZ	TM-181	8 Mar 1957-12 Feb 1958; 12 Feb 1958 – Oct 1959; Oct 1959-15 Oct 1961; To 612th Radar Sq
613th Aircraft Control and Warning Squadron		Johnson AB, Japan; Misawa AB, Japan; Tomari AS, Japan; Misawa Air Base, Japan	J-16; J-57 J-57	15 Jul 1946–ca. 30 Sep 1946 ca. 30 Sep 1946-6 Jan 1957; 6 Jan 1957-6 Jan 1958; 6 Jan 1958 – 8 Sep 1960
614th Aircraft Control and Warning Squadron		Fort Shafter, HI; Hickam AFB, HI; Grenier Field, NH; Dobbins AFB, GA; Andrews AFB, MD; Cherry Point MCAS, NC	M-116	1946-7 Feb 1949; 7 Feb 1949-1 Jul 1952; 1 Jul 1952-24 Dec 1953; 24 Dec 1953-15 May 1956; 15 May 1956-16 Apr 1957; 16 Apr 1957-1 Mar 1963; To 614th Radar Sq
615th Aircraft Control and Warning Squadron		Hanawahua, HI; Pruem AS, Germany; Neubruecke Army Installation, Germany; Birkenfeld AS, Germany; Boerfink, Germany		ca. 1 Aug 1946–ca.1 Feb 1947; 1 Nov 1953–ca. Jan 1958 unknown by Nov 1960 to 31 Dec 1969 to 29 Sep 1986; Was 580th Signal Acft Warning Bn
616th Aircraft Control and Warning Squadron		Fort Shafter, HI; Kahuku Army Airfield, HI; Flandern Kaserne, Ulm, Germany; Dobraberg, Germany; Wasserkuppe AS, Germany		2 Jul 1946 – Aug 1946; Aug 1946-11 Dec 1948; 1 Nov 1953 – Nov 1960; Nov 1960-1 Jul 1974; 1 Jul 1974-1 Jan 1979; Was 581st Signal Acft Warning Bn; The 616th began operations at the Wasserkuppe in 1962.
617th Aircraft Control and Warning Squadron		Fort Shafter, HI; Otis AFB, MA		1946–1947; 1 Nov 1953 – Dec 1954
618th Aircraft Control and Warning Squadron		Fort William McKinley, Philippines; Hanshin Airfield, Japan; Itazuke AB, Japan; Miho AB, Japan	J-10; J-13; J-55	1 Aug 1946-c. Dec 1946 c. 1948-c. 1953 unknown-1955 1955-c. 31 Dec 1955
619th Aircraft Control and Warning Squadron		Laoag, Philippines; Floridablanca, Philippines; Kadena AB, Japan; Harmon AFB, Guam		1 Aug 1946-1946; 1946 – Mar 1947; Mar 1947 – Mar 1948; Mar 1948-1 Apr 49; To 619th Tac Control Sq
620th Aircraft Control and Warning Squadron		Palawan, Philippines; Fort William McKinley, Philippines; Kadena AB, Japan; Nagoya AB, Japan; Johnson AB, Japan; Shiroi AS, Japan; Niigata, Japan; Sado Shima, Japan	J-16; J-32; J-30	1 Aug 1946–ca. 1 Apr 1947 ca.1 Apr 1947-20 May 1947 20 May 1947-9 Jun 1947; 9 Jun 1947-25 Sep 1947; 25 Sep 1947 – Jul 1948; Jul 1948–ca. 3 Jun 1949 ca. 3 Jun 1949–ca. 14 Oct 1954 ca. 14 Oct 1954-3 Feb 1958; To 620th Tac Control Sq
621st Aircraft Control and Warning Squadron		Palawan, Philippines; Fort William McKinley, Philippines; Nagoya AB, Japan; Johnson AB, Japan; Shiroi AS, Japan; Niigata, Japan; Sado Shima, Japan	J-16; J-32; J-30	1 Aug 1946-1 Apr 1947; 1 Apr 1947-3 Jun 1947 3 Jun 1947-25 Sep 1947; 25 Sep 1947-21 Sep 1948; 21 Sep 1948-3 Jun 1949; 3 Jun 1949-14 Oct 1954; 14 Oct 1954-3 Feb 1958; To 621 Tac Control Sq
622nd Aircraft Control and Warning Squadron		Clark AB, Philippines; Otis AFB, MA		15 Mar 1947–1950; 1 Sep 1953– Dec 1954
623rd Aircraft Control and Warning Squadron		Camp Bishigawa, Japan; Stillwell Park, Kadena AB, Japan; Camp Bishigawa, Japan; Naha AB, Japan		Sep 1945–Jun 1950; Jun 1950–24 Aug 1951; 25 Aug 1951-01 Jul 1952; 01 Jul 1952-8 Jul 1973; Was 305th Ftr Control Sq, when reactivated 1 April 1983, became 623rd Tac Control Sq at Kadena AB, Japan, to 623rd Air Control Sq, to 623d Air Control Flight, to 623d Air Control Squadron
624th Aircraft Control and Warning Squadron		Camp Bishigawa, Japan; Kadena AB, Japan; Naha AB, Japan; Motobu Airfield, Japan		ca. 15 Aug 1946–ca. Jul 1950 ca.Jul 1950–ca. Sep 1950 ca. Sep 1950 – Jul 1956; Jul 1956– unknown
625th Aircraft Control and Warning Squadron		Davis AFB, AK; Elmendorf AFB, AK unknown	F-11	16 Aug 1946-1 Jul 1948; 1 Jul 1948-5 Dec 1952 to 625th Acft Control Sq, returned to 625th AC&W Sq ca. 1 Jan 1959-1 Jan 1962; To 625th Radar Sq
626th Aircraft Control and Warning Squadron		Shemya AFB, AK; Ladd AFB, AK; McChord AFB, WA; Fire Island AFS, AK	F-1	16 Aug 1946-26 Mar 1948; 26 Mar 1948-22 Jun 1948; 22 Jun 1948-1 May 1949; 17 Nov 1950 – 15 Oct 1969
627th Aircraft Control and Warning Squadron		Harmon AFB, Guam; Dobbins AFB, GA; Crystal Springs AFS, AL	TM-195	20 Mar 1948-1948; 8 Apr 1957-15 May 1958; 15 May 1958-1 Oct 1959; To 627th Radar Sq
628th Aircraft Control and Warning Squadron		Fort Gulick, Canal Zone; France Field, Canal Zone; Alexandria AFB, LA; Moody AFB, GA		1946 – Jul 1947; Jul 1947–ca.17 Oct 1948; 1 Nov 1953-2 Dec 1953; 2 Dec 1953 – 18 Jul 1955
629th Aircraft Control and Warning Squadron		Albrook AFB, Canal Zone; Howard AB, Canal Zone; Alexandria AFB, LA; Udine AS, Italy		1946-15 Jul 1947; 15 Jul 1947–ca.16 Mar 1948> 1 Nov 52-9 Nov 1954 ca. Nov 1954–ca. Sep 1957
630th Aircraft Control and Warning Squadron		Alexandria AFB, LA; Otis AFB, MA; Howard AFB, Panama		1 Nov 1953-7 Jan 1954; 7 Jan 1954-8 Sep 1954; 1 Apr 1988-1 Dec 1989; Was 630th Acft Control Sq, to 630th Radar Sq, returned to 630th AC&W Sq, to 630th Radar Sq again
631st Aircraft Control and Warning Squadron		Howard AFB, Canal Zone		1946–1948
632d Aircraft Control and Warning Squadron		McChord AFB, WA; Ladd AFB, AK; Dobbins AFB, GA; Roanoke Rapids AFS, NC	M-117	21 Jun 1948-5 Jul 1949; 5 Jul 1949-1 Aug 1951; 20 May 1953-1 Sep 1955; 1 Sep 1955-1 Oct 59; To 632d Radar Sq
633rd Aircraft Control and Warning Squadron		Ladd AFB, AK; Wheelus AB, Libya		17 Nov 1950-1 Aug 1951; 1 Sep 1953 – 15 Sep 1960
634th Aircraft Control and Warning Squadron		Paine Field, WA; McChord AFB, WA; McChord AFB, WA; Geiger Field, WA; Burns AFS, WA	L-31 M-118	8 Dec 1949-14 Sep 1951; 14 Sep 1951-6 Feb 1952; 20 Jun 1953 – Oct 1954; Oct 1954-8 Jun 1955; 8 Jun 55-1 Mar 1961; Was 634th Acft Control Sq, to 634th Radar Sq}
635th Aircraft Control and Warning Squadron		McChord AFB, WA; Paine Field, WA; McChord AFB, WA; Fort Lawton, WA	L-31 RP-1	21 May 1947-26 Sep 1948; 26 Sep 1948-22 Sep 1950; 22 Sep 1950-15 May 1960; 15 May 1960-11 Jun 1960; To 635th Radar Sq
636th Aircraft Control and Warning Squadron		Hamilton Field, CA; Half Moon Bay, CA; Kirtland AFB, NM; McChord AFB, WA; Condon AFS, OR	L-82; L-45; P-4; P-32	21 May 1947 – May 1947; May 1947-26 Sep 1948; 26 Sep 1948-8 Dec 1949; 8 Dec 1949-27 Jun 1951; 27 Jun 1951-8 Sep 1960; To 636th Radar Sq
637th Aircraft Control and Warning Squadron		Long Beach Municipal Airport, CA; McChord AFB, WA; Larson AFB, WA; Saddle Mountain (renamed Othello AFS), WA	L-29; P-40	21 May 1947-16 Apr 1948 16 Apr 1948-28 Jan 1949; 28 Jan 1949 – Jan 1951; Jan 1951-1 Sep 1960; To 637th Radar Sq
638th Aircraft Control and Warning Squadron		Mount Bonaparte, (renamed Curlew AFS), WA	P-6	5 May 1950-1 Dec 1959; Was 638th Tac Control Sq
639th Aircraft Control and Warning Squadron		Truax Field, WI; Lowther AS, Ontario, Canada	C-119	8 Dec 1956–ca. 28 May 1957 ca. 28 May 1957 – 1 Jul 1963
640th Aircraft Control and Warning Squadron		Stephenville AS, Newfoundland, Canada	N-23	1 Aug 1953-30 Jun 1971
641st Aircraft Control and Warning Squadron		Goose AB, Labrador, Canada; Melville AS, Labrador, Canada	N-24	1 Aug 1953 – Apr 1957; Apr 1957-30 Jun 1971
642d Aircraft Control and Warning Squadron		Red Cliff AS, Newfoundland, Canada	N-22	1 Aug 1953-1 Oct 1961
643d Aircraft Control and Warning Squadron		Otis AFB, MA		1 Sep 1953 – 15 Jul 1954
644th Aircraft Control and Warning Squadron		Syracuse AFS, NY; Portsmouth AFS, NH	M-104	1 Oct 1954 – Jul 1955; Jul 1955-1 Oct 1957; To 644th Radar Sq
645th Aircraft Control and Warning Squadron		Roslyn AFS, NY; Marathon, Ontario, Canada	C-120	8 Dec 1949-6 Feb 1952; Planned but never activated. Was 645th Acft Control Sq. to 645th Radar Sq
646th Aircraft Control and Warning Squadron		Roslyn AFS, NY; Navesink (renamed Highlands AFS), NJ	LP-9	30 Apr 1948 – Dec 1949; Dec 1949-1 Oct 1958; To 646th Radar Sq
647th Aircraft Control and Warning Squadron		Camp Kilmer, NJ, Roslyn AFS, NY; Grenier Field, NH; Fort Meade, MD; Quantico (renamed Manassas AFS), VA	L-4; RP-54; P-55	30 Apr 1948-1948; 1948 – Mar 1949; Mar 1949-by Jan 1951 before Jan 1951 – Apr 1952; Apr 1952-1 Oct 1959; To 647th Radar Sq
648th Aircraft Control and Warning Squadron		Pine Camp, NY; Indiantown Gap AIN, PA; Benton AFS, PA	L-6; L-9; P-30	30 Apr 1948 – Dec 1949; Dec 1949-1 Feb 1952; 1 Feb 1952-1 Feb 1959; To 648th Radar Sq
649th Aircraft Control and Warning Squadron		Roslyn AFS, NY; Roslyn AFS, NY; Bedford AFS, VA	M-121	ca. 1 Apr 1949-1 Oct 1949; 26 Apr 1953–ca. 30 Nov 1954 ca. 30 Nov 1954-8 Apr 1959; Was 649th Acft Ctl Sq, to 649th Radar Sq.
650th Aircraft Control and Warning Squadron		Orlando AFB, FL; Snelling AFS, MN; Dallas Center AFS, IA	M-122	20 Nov 1948-27 Sep 1949; 20 May 1953 – Jul 1955; Jul 1955-8 Oct 1957
651st Aircraft Control and Warning Squadron		Orlando AFB, FL; Hamilton AFB, CA; Roslyn AFS, NY; Berlin AFS, MD	M-123	20 Nov 1948-1 Oct 1949; 20 Jun 1953 – 22 Apr 1954; 22 Apr 1954-8 Aug 1955; Planned but never activated
652nd Aircraft Control and Warning Squadron		Orlando AFB, FL; Dobbins AFB, GA		20 Nov 1948-c. 27 Sep 1949; 18 Jun 1953 – 8 Aug 1955
653d Aircraft Control and Warning Squadron		Stewart AFB, NY; Tinker AFB, OK; Alexandria AFB (renamed England AFB), LA		8 Dec 1949-6 Feb 1952; 18 Jun 1953-12 Nov 1954; 12 Nov 1954-1 Aug 1963
654th Aircraft Control and Warning Squadron		Grenier Field, NH; Brunswick AFS, ME	P-13	8 Dec 1949–ca. 1 Jan 1951 ca. 1 Jan 1951-1 Oct 1959; To 654th Radar Sq
655th Aircraft Control and Warning Squadron		Camp Drum, NY; Watertown AFS, NY	L-6; P-49	8 Dec 1949 – Feb 1951; Feb 1951-1 Feb 1959; To 655th Radar Sq
656th Aircraft Control and Warning Squadron		Schenectady, NY; Schuylerville (renamed Saratoga Springs AFS), NY	L-7; P-50	27 Nov 1950 – Feb 1952; Feb 1952-15 Dec 1958; To 656th Radar Sq
657th Aircraft Control and Warning Squadron		Fort Williams, ME; Tinker AFB, OK; Houma AFS, LA	L-2 M-126	27 Nov 1950-18 Oct 1951; 18 Jun 1953-31 Mar 1955; 31 Mar 1955-1 Mar 1961; To 657th Radar Sq
658th Aircraft Control and Warning Squadron		Mitchel AFB, NY; Santini, New York; Hamilton AFB, CA; Winnemucca AFS, NV	L-11 M-127	5 May 1950-Fall 1951; Fall 1951–5 Jan 1952; 20 Jun 1953 – Feb 1956; Feb 1956-1 Mar 1961; To 658th Radar Sq
659th Aircraft Control and Warning Squadron		Norton AFB, CA; Kingman AFS, AZ	M-128	20 Jun 1953-22 Jun 1955; 22 Jun 1955 – 15 Aug 1958
660th Aircraft Control and Warning Squadron		Selfridge AFB, MI; Dobbins AFB, GA; MacDill AFB, FL	M-129	5 Dec 1949-6 Feb 1952; 18 Jun 1953-24 Apr 1954; 24 Apr 1954-1 Mar 1961; To 660th Radar Sq
661st Aircraft Control and Warning Squadron		Selfridge AFB, MI	P-20	5 Dec 1949-1 Nov 1959; To 661st Radar Sq
662d Aircraft Control and Warning Squadron		Ravenna Airport, OH; Brookfield AFS, OH	L-18; P-62	18 Apr 1950 – Oct 1951; Oct 1951-15 Jul 1960; To 662d Radar Sq
663d Aircraft Control and Warning Squadron		McGee-Tyson Airport, TN; Maryville, Tennessee; Cross Mountain AFS (renamed Lake City AFS), TN	L-47 P-41	27 Nov 1950 – Nov 1951; Nov 1951 – Mar 1952; Mar 1952-1 Jun 1961
664th Aircraft Control and Warning Squadron		Lockbourne AFB, OH; Bellefontaine AFS, OH	P-73	17 Apr 1950– Sep 1951; Sep 1951-1 Sep 1959; To 664th Radar Sq
665th Aircraft Control and Warning Squadron		Keweenaw, (renamed Calumet AFS), MI	P-16	27 Nov 1950-15 Jul 1960; To 665th Radar Sq
666th Aircraft Control and Warning Squadron		Mount Tamalpais (later Mill Valley AFS), CA	P-38	27 Nov 1950-15 Jan 1961; To 666th Radar Sq
667th Aircraft Control and Warning Squadron		Hamilton AFB, CA; Keflavik Airport, Iceland; Langanes AS, Iceland; Hofn AS, Iceland	H-2; H-3	8 Dec 1949-6 Feb 1952; 8 Aug 1956-16 Apr 1957; 16 Apr 1957 – Jun 1961; Jun 1961-30 Sep 1988
668th Aircraft Control and Warning Squadron		Hamilton AFB, CA; Mather AFB, CA	P-58	8 Dec 1949-10 Jan 1951; 10 Jan 1951 – 1 Sep 1961
669th Aircraft Control and Warning Squadron		Fort MacArthur, CA; Santa Rosa Island AFS, CA	L-43; P-15	5 May 1950 – Feb 1952; Feb 1952-1 Apr 1963; To 669th Radar Sq
670th Aircraft Control and Warning Squadron		Camp Cooke, CA; San Clemente Island AFS, CA	L-41; P-39	5 May 1950-21 Aug 1951; 21 Aug 1951-1 Apr 1961; To 670th Radar Sq
671st Aircraft Control and Warning Squadron		Key West NAS, FL	Z-209	1 Jun 1962-15 Jun 1965; To 671st Radar Sq
672d Aircraft Control and Warning Squadron		Mitchel AFB, NY; Roslyn AFS, NY; Arlington, Virginia; Gravelly Point, VA; Syracuse AFS, NY; Barrington AS, Nova Scotia, Canada	C-102	28 Mar 1949-1 Apr 1949; 1 Apr 1949-10 Jun 1949; 10 Jun 1949-28 Jul 1949; 28 Jul 1949-8 Dec 1949; 8 Dec 1956-Summer 1957; Summer 1957-1 Jun 1962
673rd Aircraft Control and Warning Squadron		Snelling AFS, MN; Otis AFB, MA		7 Oct 1950-6 Feb 1952; 1 Sep 1953 – 1 Aug 1954
674th Aircraft Control and Warning Squadron		East Farmington (renamed Osceola AFS), WI	P-35	8 Oct 1950-15 Dec 1959; To 674th Radar Sq
675th Aircraft Control and Warning Squadron		Valentine AFS, TX	TM-184	constituted in 1955 but never activated
676th Aircraft Control and Warning Squadron		Antigo AFB, WI	P-17	1 May 1951-15 Jul 1960; To 676th Radar Sq
677th Aircraft Control and Warning Squadron		Fort Williams AFS, ME; Willow Run AFS, MI; Alpena AFS, MI	L-1; P-23; M-105	1 Sep 1953 – May 1954; May 1954 – Dec 1954; Dec 1954 – Nov 1957
678th Aircraft Control and Warning Squadron		Dobbins AFB, GA; Tyndall AFB, FL	TM-158	18 Jan 1956-20 Aug 1956; 20 Aug 1956-15 Jul 1965; To 678th Radar Sq
679th Aircraft Control and Warning Squadron		Great Falls AFB, MT; Dow AFB, ME; Dobbins AFB, GA; Jacksonville NAS, FL	M-114	1 Mar 1951-6 Feb 1952; 1 Sep 1953-24 Dec 1953; 24 Dec 1953-9 Jul 1957; 9 Jul 1957-1 Oct 1962; To 679th Radar Sq
680th Aircraft Control and Warning Squadron		Yaak AFS, MT	P-11	1 Mar 1951-1 Jul 1960; To 680th Radar Sq
681st Aircraft Control and Warning Squadron		Del Bonita (renamed Cut Bank AFS), MT	P-24	1 Mar 1951-1 Mar 1961; To 681st Radar Sq
682d Aircraft Control and Warning Squadron		Geiger Field, WA; Kirtland AFB, NM; Hamilton AFB, CA; Almaden AFS, CA	M-96	1 Dec 1953–ca. 31 Dec 1953 ca. 31 Dec 1953-1 Aug 1954; 1 Aug 1954–ca. 1 Oct 1957 ca. 1 Oct 1957-15 Jan 1961; To 682d Radar Sq
683d Aircraft Control and Warning Squadron		Geiger Field, WA; Tinker AFB, OK; Sweetwater AFS, TX	M-89	1 Dec 1953-1 Dec 1953; 1 Dec 1953-4 Apr 1956; 4 Apr 1956-20 Sep 1969; USAF site shared with Army for Nike missile-defense system, 1956–1969
684th Aircraft Control and Warning Squadron		Geiger Field, WA; Kirtland AFB, NM; Davis–Monthan AFB, AZ; Mount Lemmon AFS, AZ	M-92	1 Dec 1953-1 Dec 1953; 1 Dec 1953-19 Apr 1954; 19 Apr 1954-15 Aug 1956; 15 Aug 1956-15 Oct 1961; To 684th Radar Sq
685th Aircraft Control and Warning Squadron		Norton AFB, CA; Geiger Field, WA; Kirtland AFB, NM; Las Cruces AFS, NM	M-95	27 Nov 1950-6 Feb 1952; 1 Dec 1953-1 Dec 1953; 1 Dec 1953-17 Jan 1955; 17 Jan 1955 – 1 Aug 1963
686th Aircraft Control and Warning Squadron		Walker AFB, NM	M-90	1 Oct 1953 – 1 Aug 1963
687th Aircraft Control and Warning Squadron		Kirtland AFB, NM; West Mesa AFS, NM	M-94	1 Oct 1953-20 Jun 1956; 20 Jun 1956 – 8 Sep 1968
688th Aircraft Control and Warning Squadron		Geiger Field, WA; Tinker AFB, OK; Amarillo AFB, TX	M-88	1 Oct 1953-26 Dec 1953; 26 Dec 1953-3 Oct 1954; 3 Oct 1954 – 1 Aug 1963
689th Aircraft Control and Warning Squadron		Portland International Airport, OR; Mt. Hebo AFS, OR	M-100	1 Oct 1953–ca. Oct 1956 ca. Oct 1956-15 Jul 1960; To 689th Radar Sq
690th Aircraft Control and Warning Squadron		Kirtland AFB, NM; Elizabethtown AFS, PA	M-107	8 Dec 1949-6 Feb 1952 programmed, but never activated
691st Aircraft Control and Warning Squadron		Cross City AFS, FL	TM-200	8 Jun 1958-1 Oct 1959; To 691st Radar Sq
692d Aircraft Control and Warning Squadron		Fort Snelling, MN; Baudette AFS, MN	SM-132	8 Aug 1958 – Nov 1958; Nov 1958-15 Dec 1959; To 692d Radar Sq
693d Aircraft Control and Warning Squadron		Dobbins AFB, GA; Dauphin Island AFS, AL	TM-196	8 Apr 1958-1 Sep 1958; 1 Sep 1958-1 Mar 1961; To 693d Radar Sq
694th Aircraft Control and Warning Squadron		Malmstrom AFB, MT; Lewistown AFS, MT	TM-178	8 Aug 1958-1 Nov 1958; 1 Nov 1958-1 Mar 1961; To 694th Radar Sq
697th Aircraft Control and Warning Squadron		Kirtland AFB, NM; Pyote AFS, TX	TM-186	8 Dec 1956-21 Feb 1957; 21 Feb 1957 – 1 Aug 1963
698th Aircraft Control and Warning Squadron		Dobbins AFB, GA; Thomasville AFS, GA	TM-197	8 Dec 1957-15 Mar 1958; 15 Mar 1958-1 Oct 1959; To 698th Radar Sq
699th Aircraft Control and Warning Squadron		Bowling Green AFS, MO	M-108	programmed, but never activated
700th Aircraft Control and Warning Squadron		Grenier Field, NH; Willow Run AFS, MI; Two Creeks AFS, WI	M-106	1 Dec 1953-21 Feb 1957; Apr 1954 – Dec 1954; Dec 1954–ca. 1 Nov 1957
701st Aircraft Control and Warning Squadron		Dobbins AFB, GA; Fort Fisher AFS, NC	M-115	1 Dec 1953-1 Aug 1955; 1 Aug 1955-1 Jul 1962; To 701st Radar Sq
702d Aircraft Control and Warning Squadron		Dobbins AFB, GA; Hunter AFB, GA	M-112	1 Dec 1953-23 Mar 1955; 23 Mar 1955-1 Feb 1962; To 702d Radar Sq
703d Aircraft Control and Warning Squadron		Tinker AFB, OK; Texarkana AFS, AR	M-91	1 Dec 1953-1 May 1955; 1 May 1955 – 8 Sep 1968
704th Aircraft Control and Warning Squadron		Willow Run AFS, MI; Carmi AFS, IL	SM-137	ca. 8 Mar 1955–ca. Aug 1955 ca. Aug 1955–ca. 1 Nov 1957
705th Aircraft Control and Warning Squadron		King Salmon AFS, AK	F-3	8 Dec 1952 – 1 Nov 1983
706th Aircraft Control and Warning Squadron		Malmstrom AFB, MT; Dickinson AFS, ND	TM-177	8 Dec 1957-19 Jul 1958; 29 Jul 1958-15 Jul 1961; To 706th Radar Sq
707th Aircraft Control and Warning Squadron		Snelling AFS, MN; Grand Rapids AFS, MN	SM-138	8 Apr 1956 – Jul 1956; Jul 1956-15 Dec 1959; To 707th Radar Sq
708th Aircraft Control and Warning Squadron		Indian Mountain AFS, AK	F-16	8 Dec 1952 – 1 Nov 1983
709th Aircraft Control and Warning Squadron		Fort Yukon AFS, AK	F-14	ca. 1 Nov 1957 – 1 Nov 1983
710th Aircraft Control and Warning Squadron		Tin City AFS, AK	F-4	8 Dec 1952 – 1 Nov 1983
711th Aircraft Control and Warning Squadron		Cape Lisburne AFS, AK	F-7	8 Dec 1952 – 1 Nov 1983
712th Aircraft Control and Warning Squadron		Northeast Cape AFS, AK	F-9	8 Dec 1952 – 1 Nov 1983
713th Aircraft Control and Warning Squadron		Eielson AFB, AK; Bethel, AK	F-21	8 Feb 1957-1 Jun 1957; 1 Jun 1957 – 1 Oct 1963
714th Aircraft Control and Warning Squadron		Cold Bay AFS, AK	F-26	1 Jan 1959 – 1 Nov 1883
715th Aircraft Control and Warning Squadron		Unknown Alaskan Station; Umiat AFS, AK	F-26	15 Aug 1953-6 Aug 1954; 6 Aug 1954–ca. 1959
716th Aircraft Control and Warning Squadron		Geiger Field, WA; Kalispell AFS, MT	TM-179	1 Oct 1958 – May 1959; May 1959-15 Oct 1960; To 716th Radar Sq
717th Aircraft Control and Warning Squadron		Takotna (later Tatalina AFS), AK	F-10	8 Dec 1952 – 1 Nov 1983
718th Aircraft Control and Warning Squadron		Unalakleet AFS, AK	F-20	by 1 Apr 1958 – 5 Oct 1969
719th Aircraft Control and Warning Squadron		Sparrevohn AFS, AK	F-15	8 Dec 1952 – 1 Nov 1983
720th Aircraft Control and Warning Squadron		Middleton Island AFS, AK	F-22	8 Sep 1955 – 1 Oct 1963
721st Aircraft Control and Warning Squadron		Roslyn AFS, NY; Snelling AFS, MN; Wilmar AFS, MN	TM-179	16 Apr 1950-2 Jun 1951; 8 Apr 1956 – Jul 1956; Jul 1956-15 Jan 1960; To 721st Radar Sq.
722d Aircraft Control and Warning Squadron		Silver Lake, WA; Sioux City Municipal Airport, IA	SM-140	ca. 15 Mar 1950–ca. 8 Jun 1951; Programmed, but never activated To 722d Support Sq
723d Aircraft Control and Warning Squadron		Selfridge AFB, MI; Falls City AFS, NE	SM-141	May 1950–ca. 8 Jun 1951; Programmed, but never activated
724th Aircraft Control and Warning Squadron		Hamilton AFB, CA; Nevada AFS, MO	SM-142	ca. 27 Apr 1950–ca. 8 Jun 1951; Programmed, but never activated
725th Aircraft Control and Warning Squadron		Kirtland AFB, NM; Tinker AFB, OK; Walnut Ridge AFS, AR	SM-193	ca. 27 Apr 1950-8 Jun 1951; 8 Apr 1955-4 Apr 1956; 4 Apr 1956-1 May 1962; To 725th Radar Sq
727th Aircraft Control and Warning Squadron		Shaw AFB, SC; Myrtle Beach AFB, SC		2 Sep 1950-26 Sep 1954; 27 Sep 1954-1 Jul 1964; To 727th Tac Control Sq
728th Aircraft Control and Warning Squadron		Turner AFB, GA; Pope AFB, NC; Shaw AFB, SC		2 Sep 1950-2 Nov 1950; 2 Nov 1950-15 Jan 1954; 15 Jan 1954-1 Jul 1964; To 728th Tac Control Sq
729th Aircraft Control and Warning Squadron		Pope AFB, NC; Clovis AFB, NM; Robins AFB, GA		5 Mar 1951-6 Nov 1952; 6 Nov 1952-1 Dec 1953; 1 Dec 1953-15 Jul 1958; To 729th Tac Control Sq
730th Aircraft Control and Warning Squadron		Union City AFS, TN	SM-144	Programmed, but never activated
732d Aircraft Control and Warning Squadron		Oklahoma City AFS, OK; Ozona AFS, TX	TM-187	8 Nov 1956-25 Jul 1957; 25 Jul 1957 – 1 Aug 1963
733d Aircraft Control and Warning Squadron		Oklahoma City AFS, OK; Eagle Pass AFS, TX	TM-188	8 Sep 1956-2 Jul 1957; 2 Jul 1957 – 1 Aug 1963
734th Aircraft Control and Warning Squadron		D'jenane Krater, Morocco	Y-3	Sept 1952 May 1962
735th Aircraft Control and Warning Squadron		Nouasseur AB, Morocco; Mechra bel Ksiri, Morocco	Y-5	8 Oct 1952-9 Dec 1952; 9 Dec 1952–ca. 18 Mar 1960
736th Aircraft Control and Warning Squadron		Nouasseur AB, Morocco		8 Oct 1952 – 30 Jun 1962
737th Aircraft Control and Warning Squadron		Saida, Morocco	Y-2	8 Aug 1953– Mar 1960
738th Aircraft Control and Warning Squadron		Olathe AFS, KS	P-72	1 Feb 1953-1 Jan 1962; To 738th Radar Sq
739th Aircraft Control and Warning Squadron		Leaf River (renamed Wadena AFS), MN	P-17	1 Feb 1953-15 Jan 1963; To 739th Radar Sq
740th Aircraft Control and Warning Squadron		Rapid City AFB (renamed Ellsworth AFB), SD	M-97	1 Feb 1953 – 15 Aug 1962
741st Aircraft Control and Warning Squadron		Lackland AFB, TX	P-75	1 Feb 1953 – 31 Dec 1969
742d Aircraft Control and Warning Squadron		Ladd AFB, AK; Oklahoma City AFS, OK; Zapata AFS, TX	TM-189	1 Feb 1953-8 Apr 1953; 8 Sep 1956-1 Jul 1957; 1 Jul 1957 – 1 Jun 1961
743d Aircraft Control and Warning Squadron		Campion AFS, AK	F-8	1 Feb 1953–ca. 1 Nov 1983
744th Aircraft Control and Warning Squadron		Murphy Dome AFS, AK	F-2	1 Feb 1953–ca. 27 Jan 1992; To 744th Air Defense Squadron
745th Aircraft Control and Warning Squadron		Duncanville AFS, TX	P-78	1 Feb 1953 – 30 Sep 1969
746th Aircraft Control and Warning Squadron		Tinker AFB, OK; Oklahoma City AFS, OK	P-52	1 Feb 1953-1 Jul 1956; 1 Jul 1956 – 8 Sep 1968
747th Aircraft Control and Warning Squadron		Ellington AFB, TX	P-79	1 Feb 1953 – 31 Dec 1969
748th Aircraft Control and Warning Squadron		Kotzebue AFS, AK	F-24	8 Jan 1957–ca. 1 Nov 1983
749th Aircraft Control and Warning Squadron		Chiniak Point AFS, AL	F-18	8 Feb 1957-unknown
750th Aircraft Control and Warning Squadron		Atolia (later Boron AFS), CA	P-59	Feb 1952 – Jun 1975
751st Aircraft Control and Warning Squadron		Port Hueneme Naval Sta, CA; Mount Laguna AFS, CA	P-76	27 Nov 1950 – Sep 1951; Sep 1951-1 May 1960; To 751st Radar Sq
752d Aircraft Control and Warning Squadron		Empire AFS, MI	P-34	27 Nov 1950-15 Jul 1960; To 752d Radar Sq
753d Aircraft Control and Warning Squadron		Sault Sainte Marie AFS, MI	P-66	27 Nov 1950-15 Jul 1960; To 753d Radar Sq
754th Aircraft Control and Warning Squadron		Oscoda AFB, MI; Port Austin AFS, MI	P-61	27 Nov 1950-20 Jul 51; 20 Jul 1951-1 Sep 1959; To 754th Radar Sq
755th Aircraft Control and Warning Squadron		Elkhorn (renamed Williams Bay AFS), WI; Arlington Heights AFS, IL	P-31; RP-31	27 Nov 1950-1 Apr 1960; 1 Apr 1960-15 Jul 1960; To 755th Radar Sq
756th Aircraft Control and Warning Squadron		Finland AFS, MN	P-69	27 Nov 1950-15 Dec 1959; To 756th Radar Sq
757th Aircraft Control and Warning Squadron		Paine Field, WA; Birch Bay (renamed Blaine AFS, WA)	L-31; P-46	27 Nov 1950-15 Aug 1951; 15 Aug 1951-1 Apr 1960; To 757th Radar Sq
758th Aircraft Control and Warning Squadron		Neah Bay, Washington (renamed Makah AFS, WA)	P-44	27 Nov 1950-1 Apr 1960; To 758th Radar Sq
759th Aircraft Control and Warning Squadron		Naselle AFS, WA	P-57	27 Nov 1950-1 Apr 1960; To 759th Radar Sq
760th Aircraft Control and Warning Squadron		Colville AFS, WA	P-60	ca. 27 Nov 1950-1 Sep 1960; To 760th Radar Sq
761st Aircraft Control and Warning Squadron		Reedsport (renamed North Bend AFS), OR	P-12	6 Feb 1951-15 Jul 1960; To 761st Radar Sq
762d Aircraft Control and Warning Squadron		North Truro AFS, MA	P-10	27 Nov 1950-15 Dec 1958; To 762d Radar Sq
763d Aircraft Control and Warning Squadron		Shawnee (Renamed Lockport AFS, NY	P-21	27 Nov 1950-8 Mar1959; To 763d Radar Sq
764th Aircraft Control and Warning Squadron		Bellevue Hill (renamed Saint Albans AFS), VT	P-14	27 Nov 1950-1 Oct 1959; To 764th Radar Sq
765th Aircraft Control and Warning Squadron		Dow AFB, ME; Charleston AFS, ME	L-1; P-65	27 Nov 1950 – Aug 1951; Aug 1951-1 Oct 1959; To 765th Radar Sq
766th Aircraft Control and Warning Squadron		Limestone AFB, ME; Caswell AFS, ME	L-50; P-80	27 Nov 1950-12 Apr 1951; 12 Apr 1951-8 May 1959; To 766th Radar Sq
767th Aircraft Control and Warning Squadron		El Vado (renamed Tierra Amarilla AFS), NM	LP-8	27 Nov 1950 – 8 Feb 1959
768th Aircraft Control and Warning Squadron		Moriarty AFS, NM	P-51	27 Nov 1950 – 1 Jun 1961
769th Aircraft Control and Warning Squadron		Gonzales (renamed Continental Divide AFS), NM	P-7	27 Nov 1950 – 1 Jul 1961
770th Aircraft Control and Warning Squadron		Palermo AFS, NJ	P-54	27 Nov 1950-1 Oct 1959; To 770th Radar Sq
771st Aircraft Control and Warning Squadron		Fort Custis (renamed Cape Charles AFS), VA	P-56	27 Nov 1950-1 Oct 1959; To 771st Radar Sq
772d Aircraft Control and Warning Squadron		Connellsville, PA; Blue Knob Park (later Claysburg AFS, PA)	L-16; P-63	27 Nov 1950–1951 by Dec 1951-8 Mar 1959; To 772d Radar Sq
773d Aircraft Control and Warning Squadron		Camp Hero (renamed Montauk AFS), NY	P-45	27 Nov 1950-1 Oct 1958; To 773d Radar Sq
774th Aircraft Control and Warning Squadron		Madera AFS, CA	P-74	27 Nov 1950-15 Jan 1961; To 774th Radar Sq
775th Aircraft Control and Warning Squadron		Cambria AFS, CA	P-2	27 Nov 1950-1 May 1961; To 775th Radar Sq
776th Aircraft Control and Warning Squadron		Point Arena AFS, CA	P-37	27 Nov 1950-15 Jan 1961; To 776th Radar Sq
777th Aircraft Control and Warning Squadron		Klamath AFS, CA	P-53	27 Nov 1950-15 Jul 1960; To 777th Radar Sq
778th Aircraft Control and Warning Squadron		Simpson (renamed Havre AFS), MT	P-25	1 Mar 1951-1 Mar 1961; To 778th Radar Sq
779th Aircraft Control and Warning Squadron		Opheim AFS, NE	P-26	1 Mar 1951-15 Jul 1961; To 779th Radar Sq
780th Aircraft Control and Warning Squadron		Fortuna AFS, ND	P-27	1 Mar 1951-1 Aug 1961; To 780th Radar Sq
781st Aircraft Control and Warning Squadron		Fort Custer (renamed Custer AFS), MI	P-67	16 Apr 1951-1 Sep 1959; To 781st Radar Sq
782d Aircraft Control and Warning Squadron		Rockville AFS, IN	P-53	16 Apr 1951 – 1 Nov 1959; To 782d Radar Sq
783d Aircraft Control and Warning Squadron		Guthrie AFS, WV	P-43	16 Apr 1951-1 Jul 1961; To 783d Radar Sq
784th Aircraft Control and Warning Squadron		Fort Knox (renamed Snow Mountain AFS), KY	P-82	16 Apr 1951-1 May 1962; To 784th Radar Sq
785th Aircraft Control and Warning Squadron		Finley AFS, ND	P-29	16 Apr 1951-15 Jan 1960; To 785th Radar Sq
786th Aircraft Control and Warning Squadron		Velva (renamed Minot AFS), ND	P-28	20 May 1951-15 Jul 1961; To 786th Radar Sq
787th Aircraft Control and Warning Squadron		Moulton (renamed Chandler AFS), MN	L-18	27 Jun 1951-1 Apr 1961; To 787th Radar Sq
788th Aircraft Control and Warning Squadron		Waverly AFS, IA	P-81	10 Apr 1951-1 Nov 1959; To 788th Radar Sq
789th Aircraft Control and Warning Squadron		Omaha AFS, NE	P-71	1 May 1951-1 Jan 1962; To 789th Radar Sq
790th Aircraft Control and Warning Squadron		Sublette (renamed Kirksville AFS), MO	P-64	1 May 1951-1 Nov 1959; To 790th Radar Sq
791st Aircraft Control and Warning Squadron		Hanna City AFS, IL	P-85	1 May 1951-1 Nov 1959; To 791st Radar Sq
792d Aircraft Control and Warning Squadron		Tinker AFB, OK; Dobbins AFB, GA; North Charleston AFS, SC	M-113	19 Mar 1951-4 Jun 1951; 1 Nov 1953-24 Jan 1955; 24 Jan 1955-25 Mar 1962; To 792d Radar Sq
793d Aircraft Control and Warning Squadron		Hutchinson AFS, KS	P-47	1 May 1951-1 Feb 1962; To 793d Radar Sq
794th Aircraft Control and Warning Squadron		Cape Newenham, AK	F-5	8 Nov 1952 – 1 Nov 1983
795th Aircraft Control and Warning Squadron		Cape Romanzof AFS, AK	F-6	8 Nov 1952 – 1 Nov 1983
796th Aircraft Control and Warning Squadron		Bartlesville AFS, OK	P-77	1 May 1951 – 1 Jun 1961
797th Aircraft Control and Warning Squadron		Fordland AFS, MO	P-68	1 May 1951 – 1 Jun 1961
798th Aircraft Control and Warning Squadron		Belleville AFS, IL	P-70	1 May 1951-1 Mar 1962; To 798th Radar Sq
799th Aircraft Control and Warning Squadron		Wright-Patterson AFB, OH; Joelton AFS, TN	SM-145	8 Feb 1956-1 Oct 1956; 1 Oct 1956 – 1 Jun 1961
801st Aircraft Control and Warning Squadron		Malmstrom AFB, MT	SM-147	8 Oct 1955-1 Mar 1961; To 801st Radar Sq
808th Aircraft Control and Warning Squadron		Snelling AFS, MN; Rochester AFS, MN	M-101	20 Jun 1953 – Sep 1955; Sep 1955-8 Sep 1957
809th Aircraft Control and Warning Squadron		Willow Run AFS, MI; Owingsville AFS, KY		20 Jun 1953 – Dec 1954; Dec 1954–ca. 1 Nov 1957
810th Aircraft Control and Warning Squadron		Dobbins AFB, GA; Andrews AFB, MD; Winston-Salem AFS, NC	M-130	20 Jun 1953 – May 1956; May 1956 – Nov 1956; Nov 1956-1 Mar 1962; To 810th Radar Sq
811th Aircraft Control and Warning Squadron		Oklahoma City AFS, OK; Port Isabel AFS, TX	TM-190	8 Apr 1956–ca. 8 Jan 1958 ca. 8 Jan 1958 – 1 Jun 1961
812th Aircraft Control and Warning Squadron		Oklahoma City AFS, OK; Lake Charles AFS, LA	TM-194	8 Apr 1956 – Apr 1956; Apr 1956-30 Apr 1957; 30 Apr 1957 – 1 Sep 1961
813th Aircraft Control and Warning Squadron		Oklahoma City AFS, OK; Rockport AFS, TX	TM-191	18 Dec 1956–1957; 1957-1 Aug 1963
814th Aircraft Control and Warning Squadron		Oklahoma City AFS, OK; Killeen AFS (renamed Robert Gray AFB, TX	TM-192	8 May 1956-14 Feb 1957; 14 Feb 1957 – 1 Feb 1961
815th Aircraft Control and Warning Squadron		Oklahoma City AFS, OK; Lufkin AFS, TX	TM-193	8 May 1956 – Nov 1957; Nov 1957-1 Jun 1961
816th Aircraft Control and Warning Squadron		Nogales AFS, AZ	TM-182	programmed, but never activated
817th Aircraft Control and Warning Squadron		Foster AFB, TX		To be activated 8 Oct 1956, orders rescinded
818th Aircraft Control and Warning Squadron		Randolph AFB, TX		8 Oct 1956 – 15 Jul 1958
819th Aircraft Control and Warning Squadron		Ellington AFB, TX		8 Oct 1956 – 15 Oct 1957
820th Aircraft Control and Warning Squadron		Robins AFB, GA; Fort Heath, MA	SM-148	programmed, but not activated 1 Dec 1961-1 Dec 1962 was 820th Radar Sq
821st Aircraft Control and Warning Squadron		Geiger Field, WA; Baker AFS, OR	SM-149	ca. Sep 1957 – Jul 1959; Jul 1959-15 Oct 1960; To 821st Radar Sq
822d Aircraft Control and Warning Squadron		Geiger Field, WA; Cottonwood AFS, ID	SM-150	ca. Feb 1957 – Jul 1958; Jul 1958-1 Sep 1960; To 822d Radar Sq
823d Aircraft Control and Warning Squadron		Geiger Field, WA; Mica Peak AFS, WA	SM-151	8 Apr 1955–1956; 1956-1 Sep 1960; To 823d Radar Sq
825th Aircraft Control and Warning Squadron		Kamloops AS, British Columbia, Canada; McChord AFB, WA; Kamloops AS, British Columbia, Canada	C-153 SM-153	1956-8 Apr 1957 8 Apr 1957 – Sep 1957; Sep 1957-1 Apr 1962
826th Aircraft Control and Warning Squadron		Hachita AFS, NM	TM-183	programmed, but never activated
827th Aircraft Control and Warning Squadron		Kingsley Field, OR	TM-180	ca. Sep 1957-15 Jul 1960; To 827th Radar Sq
842d Aircraft Control and Warning Squadron		Ben Guerir AB, Morocco		ca. 1 Jan 1957–ca. 18 Mar 1960
847th Aircraft Control and Warning Squadron		Misawa AB, Japan; Unknown	J-58	25 Aug 1951-15 Mar 1955; 15 Mar 1955–ca.1961
848th Aircraft Control and Warning Squadron		Unknown; Shikotsu, Japan; Wallace AS, Philippines	R-71	ca. 25 Oct 1951–1955 by Jan 1955 – Jun 1955; Oct 1958-22 Nov 1989; To 848th Air Defense Sq
849th Aircraft Control and Warning Squadron		Probably Komaki AB, Japan	J-21	ca. 1 Mar 1955–ca. 31 Dec 1957
850th Aircraft Control and Warning Squadron		Itazuke AB, Japan	J-13	25 Aug 1951-later than 1960
851st Aircraft Control and Warning Squadron		Kadena AB, Japan; Camp Bishigawa, Japan; Naha AB, Japan		25 Aug 1951–ca Dec 1951 ca. Dec 1951–ca. Jul 1952 ca. Jul 1952-16 Mar 1955; To Detachment #1, 313th Air Division
852d Aircraft Control and Warning Squadron		Mount Santa Rosa, Guam	R-57	ca. 18 Apr 1952 – 8 Jun 1960
853d Aircraft Control and Warning Squadron		Japan		25 Aug 1951-after 20 Sep 1952
854th Aircraft Control and Warning Squadron		Clark AB, Philippines		25 Aug 1951 – 20 Sep 1952
858th Aircraft Control and Warning Squadron		Hamilton AFB, CA; Fallon AFS, NV	SM-156	8 Oct 1953–1956; 1956-1 Dec 1962; To 858th Radar Sq
859th Aircraft Control and Warning Squadron		Hamilton AFB, CA; Red Bluff AFS, CA	SM-157	8 Sep 1955–1956; 1956-15 Jul 1960; To 859th Radar Sq
860th Aircraft Control and Warning Squadron		Hamilton AFB, CA; Ferndale AFS, CA	SM-158	8 Nov 1954–ca. 31 Dec 1954; Move cancelled, squadron inactivated
861st Aircraft Control and Warning Squadron		Dobbins AFB, GA; Aiken AFS, SC	SM-159	8 Apr 1955-15 Aug 1955; 15 Aug 1955-1 Nov 1961; To 861st Radar Sq
862d Aircraft Control and Warning Squadron		Poston AFS, AZ	SM-160	programmed, but never activated
863d Aircraft Control and Warning Squadron		Shafter Gap AFS, CA	SM-161	programmed, but never activated
864th Aircraft Control and Warning Squadron		Vincent AFB (renamed Yuma AFS), AZ	SM-162	8 Aug 1955 – 1 Aug 1963
865th Aircraft Control and Warning Squadron		Norton AFB, CA; Las Vegas AFS, NV	SM-163	8 Nov 1955-25 Jun 56; 25 Jun 56-15 Oct 61; To 865th Radar Sq
866th Aircraft Control and Warning Squadron		Hamilton AFB, CA; Hamilton AFB, CA; Tonopah AFS, NV	SM-164	8 Nov 1954-15 Dec 1954; 8 Oct 1955 – May 1956; May 1956-1 Jul 1961; To 866th Radar Sq
867th Aircraft Control and Warning Squadron		Dobbins AFB, GA; Flintstone AFS, GA	SM-162	8 Aug 1955-1955; 1955-1 Jun 61
871st Aircraft Control and Warning Squadron		Villatobas AS, Spain		ca. 1 Jul 1957 – 1 Jan 1965
872d Aircraft Control and Warning Squadron		Constantina AS, Spain		ca. 1 Jul 1957 – 1 Jan 1965
874th Aircraft Control and Warning Squadron		Inoges AS, Spain	W-1	5 Jan 1959 – 1 Jan 1965
875th Aircraft Control and Warning Squadron		Rosas AS, Spain		1 Feb 1959 – 1 Jan 1965
876th Aircraft Control and Warning Squadron		Benidorm AC&W Site (later Alcoy AS), Spain	W-5	1 Sep 1958-1 Jan 1965
877th Aircraft Control and Warning Squadron		Elizondo AS, Spain		1 Jul 1959 – 1 Jan 1965
880th Aircraft Control and Warning Squadron		Soller AS, Spain	W-7	1 Jul 1959 – 1 Jan 1965
902d Aircraft Control and Warning Squadron		Great Falls AFB, MT; Miles City AFS, MT	M-98	20 May 1953-16 Dec 1954; 16 Dec 1954-15 Jul 1961; To 902d Radar Sq
903d Aircraft Control and Warning Squadron		Malmstrom AFB, MT; Gettysburg AFS, South Dakota	M-99	20 May 1953-25 Oct 1955; 25 Oct 1955-15 Jan 1961; To 903d Radar Sq
904th Aircraft Control and Warning Squadron		Great Falls AFB, MT; Winslow AFS, AZ	M-93	18 Jun 1953-14 Jun 1955; 14 Jun 1955-15 Oct 61; To 904th Radar Sq
906th Aircraft Control and Warning Squadron		Willow Run AFS, MI; Grand Marais AFS, MI	M-109	26 May 1953 – Dec 1954; Dec 1954–ca. 1 Nov 1957
907th Aircraft Control and Warning Squadron		Hancock Field, NY; Bucks Harbor AFS, ME	M-110	28 May 1953 – Feb 1955; Feb 1955-1 Oct 1959; To 907th Radar Sq
908th Aircraft Control and Warning Squadron		Willow Run AFS, MI; Malmstrom AFB, MT; Dobbins AFB, GA		25 Jun 1953-12 Aug 1953; 12 Aug 1953-25 Dec 1954; 25 Dec 1954-1 Apr 1962; To 908th Radar Sq
911th Aircraft Control and Warning Squadron		Hancock Field, NY; Lyndonville AFS, Vermont	M-103	26 May 1953 – 1956; 1956-1 Oct 1959; To 911th Radar Sq
912th Aircraft Control and Warning Squadron		Grenier Field, NH; Ramore AS, Ontario, Canada	C-10	10 Mar 1952-21 Dec 1952 ca. 21 Dec 1952 – 1 Jan 1962
913th Aircraft Control and Warning Squadron		Grenier Field, NH; Pagwa River AS, Ontario, Canada	C-14	10 Mar 1952-20 Dec 1952 ca. 20 Dec 1952-1 Jun 1963
914th Aircraft Control and Warning Squadron		Grenier Field, NH; RCAF Armstrong, Ontario, Canada	C-15	10 Mar 1952-21 Dec 1952 ca. 21 Dec 1952-1 Nov 1962
915th Aircraft Control and Warning Squadron		Grenier Field, NH; Sioux Lookout AS, Ontario, Canada	C-16	10 Mar 1952-5 Dec 1952 ca. 5 Dec 1952-1 Oct 1962
916th Aircraft Control and Warning Squadron		Grenier Field, NH; Beausejour AS, Manitoba, Canada	C-17	12 Feb 1952-1 Dec 1952 ca. 1 Dec 1952-1 Oct 1961
917th Aircraft Control and Warning Squadron		Geiger Field, WA; Puntzi Mountain AS, British Columbia, Canada	C-19	16 Apr 1952-8 Nov 1952 ca. 8 Nov 1952-1 Feb 1963
918th Aircraft Control and Warning Squadron		Geiger Field, WA; Baldy Hughes AS, British Columbia, Canada	C-20	16 Apr 1952-1 Jun 1953 ca. 1 Jun 1953-1 Mar 1963
919th Aircraft Control and Warning Squadron		Geiger Field, WA; Saskatoon Mountain AS, Alberta, Canada	C-21	16 Apr 1952-1 Jun 1953 ca. 1 Jun 1953-1 Apr 1963
920th Aircraft Control and Warning Squadron		Grenier Field, NH; McAndrew AFB, Newfoundland, Canada; Resolution Island AFS, Northwest Territories, Canada	C-30	ca. 27 Oct 1951-19 Jan 1952; Jan 1952–ca. 30 Jun 1953 ca. 30 Jun 1953-1 Nov 1961
921st Aircraft Control and Warning Squadron		Grenier Field, NH; St Anthony AS, Newfoundland, Canada	C-26	26 May 1953–ca. 1 Oct 1953 ca. 1 Oct 1953 – 18 Jun 1968
922d Aircraft Control and Warning Squadron		Grenier Field, NH; Cartwright AS, Labrador, Canada	C-27	26 May 1953–ca. 1 Oct 1953 ca. 1 Oct 1953-18 Jun 1968
923d Aircraft Control and Warning Squadron		Grenier Field, NH; Hopedale AS, Labrador, Canada	C-28	13 Jun 1953–ca. 1 Nov 1953 ca. 1 Nov 1953 – 18 Jun 1968
924th Aircraft Control and Warning Squadron		Grenier Field, NH; Saglek AS, Labrador, Canada	C-29	13 Jun 1953–ca. 10 Dec 1953 ca. 10 Dec 1953 – 31 Jul 1970
926th Aircraft Control and Warning Squadron		Grenier Field, NH; Frobisher Bay, Northwest Territories, Canada	C-31	13 Jun 1953–ca. 19 Dec 1953 ca. 19 Dec 1953-1 Nov 1961
931st Aircraft Control and Warning Squadron		Thule AB, Greenland	N-32	8 Sep 1952-24 Dec 1965; After 1953 located at Pingarsuak Mountain
932d Aircraft Control and Warning Squadron		Otis AFB, MA; Keflavik Airport, Iceland; Rockville AS, Iceland	H-1	11 May 1952 – Sep 1952; Sep 1952 – Aug 1957; Aug 1957-1 Oct 1987; To 932d Air Defense Sq
933d Aircraft Control and Warning Squadron		Hofn AS, Iceland	H-3	18 Apr 1955 – 8 Oct 1960
934th Aircraft Control and Warning Squadron		Latrar AS, Iceland	H-4	8 Sep 1956 – 8 Oct 1960
936th Aircraft Control and Warning Squadron		Elmendorf AFB, AK; Sitkinak AFS, AK	F-19	8 Feb 1957-1 Jun 1957; 1 Jun 1957 – 9 Jul 1957
937th Aircraft Control and Warning Squadron		Ohlson Mountain AFS, AK	F-25	8 Feb 1957 – 1 Oct 1963

== See also ==
- List of United States Air Force squadrons
- United States general surveillance radar stations
