= Minot Air Force Station =

Closed United States Air Force General Surveillance Radar station

Minot Air Force Station
- Part of Air Defense Command (ADC)
- Gasman Township, Ward County, south of Minot, North Dakota

Site information
- Type: Air Force station
- Code: QJVM (ILC)
- Owner: civilian
- Controlled by: United States Air Force

Location
- Location of Minot AFS, North Dakota
- Coordinates: 48°00′13″N 101°17′40″W

Site history
- In use: May 1951–September 1979, 1984–1997

Garrison information
- Garrison: 786th Radar Squadron

Minot Air Force Station (ADC ID: P-28 NORAD ID: Z-28) [Permanent Installation Number (PIN): 1445; Installation Location Code (ILC): QJVM]) is a closed United States Air Force General Surveillance Radar station. It is located 16.2 miles (26.1 km) south of Minot, North Dakota; on the west side of US Highway 83. It was closed in 1979. A portion of the property was reopened in 1984 as the Minot Communications Site and served until 1997.

Minot Air Force Station was the first major Air Force installation in North Dakota, even predating the two "large" bases, Minot Air Force Base and Grand Forks Air Force Base.

== History ==
Minot Air Force Station was part of the last batch of twenty-three radar stations constructed as part of the Air Defense Command permanent network. It was activated on 20 May 1951 at Max, ND, and declared completely operational in 1952.

The 786th Aircraft Control and Warning Squadron began operations with AN/FPS-3 and AN/FPS-5 radars in April 1952, and initially the station functioned as a Ground-Control Intercept (GCI) and warning station. As a GCI station, the squadron's role was to guide interceptor aircraft toward unidentified intruders picked up on the unit's radar scopes.

It was named Minot Air Force Station on 1 December 1953. During 1957 an AN/GPS-3 search radar saw brief use. In 1958 the original radars were replaced by AN/FPS-20 search and AN/FPS-6 height-finder sets. A second height-finder set, AN/FPS-6B, was installed during the following year.

During 1961 Minot AFS joined the Semi Automatic Ground Environment (SAGE) system, initially feeding data to DC-20 at Malmstrom AFB, Montana. After joining, the squadron was redesignated as the 786th Radar Squadron (SAGE) on 15 July 1961. The radar squadron provided information 24/7 the SAGE Direction Center where it was analyzed to determine range, direction altitude speed and whether or not aircraft were friendly or hostile.

By the end of 1961 the search set had been upgraded and redesignated as an AN/FPS-66. On 31 July 1963, the site was redesignated as NORAD ID Z-28.

An AN/FPS-26A height-finder radar was installed in 1964, and the AN/FPS-6 was retired. The AN/FPS-6B was upgraded to an AN/FPS-90 also that year. In 1964 the site received an AN/FPS-27 search radar which became fully operational in early 1965. The AN/FPS-66 was removed later in 1965. In 1968 the AN/FPS-90 was retired.

In addition to the main facility, Minot operated three unmanned AN/FPS-14 (P-28A) and AN/FPS-18 (P-28B/C) Gap Filler sites:

- Niobe, ND (P-28A) 48°38′33″N 102°18′15″W
- Regan, ND (P-28D) 47°06′03″N 100°32′16″W
- Alexander, ND (P-28E) 47°40′42″N 103°32′50″W

The Alexander site was reassigned to Minot after Dickinson AFS (Z-177) closed in 1965. The site is now home to the Watford City Joint Surveillance System (JSS) (ARSR-4) LRR site (Z-300/J-76).

Over the years, the equipment at the station was upgraded or modified to improve the efficiency and accuracy of the information gathered by the radars. In 1979 the station was deactivated. On 29 September 1979 the 786th Radar Squadron was inactivated and the station was closed.

In 1984, a portion of the station was reopened by the USAF as the Minot Communication Site. It was closed again in 1997 and struck from the USAF property register and liquidated c.. 1998. Minot AFS has been sold to civilian interests, and has been reused as a housing subdivision colloquially known as the Radar Base.

== Buildings and facilities ==
Buildings on the station include:

Gate
The controlled entry point to the station
Recreation hall
Transmitter building
Used for radio contact with airborne aircraft and other ground stations
Search radar tower
Height finder radar tower
(2) Radomes
The radome "balloons", made up of several layers of latex rubber-coated nylon, are held up by one-tenth pound of air pressure per square inch. In the event of wind (a common occurrence in North Dakota), the pressure within the "balloon" is automatically adjusted by blowers.
Heating plant
Steam heat is provided for the entire station by two coal-fired boilers. There is a 70,000-gallon water reservoir fed by two 540-foot-deep (160 m) wells. The heating plant used approximately 1,000 tons of coal annually.
Hose houses
Hose houses are insulated huts for fire hydrants. Six are located at strategic locations around the station.
Air Installations Building
This is the building that most of the 17 civilian contractors work out of.

Water distribution plant
Water purification plant
20,000 gallons of high-alkaline water get processed into potable water daily by using 94%-concentrate sulfuric acid plus other filtering and purifying chemicals.
Living quarters
(2) Barracks
(25) Houses
Motor Pool
The pumps are fed by a 4,000-gallon underground gasoline storage tank, and the station uses in excess of 1,000 gallons monthly. Only minor repairs and preventative maintenance are performed here, the rest being contracted to local businesses.
Operations Building
The "Mission Central" of the base where most of the operations of the base are performed.
Chapel
Dining hall
Dispensary
Although mostly a first aid station, there is a fully qualified medic on duty here 24 hours a day.

== Air Force units and assignments ==
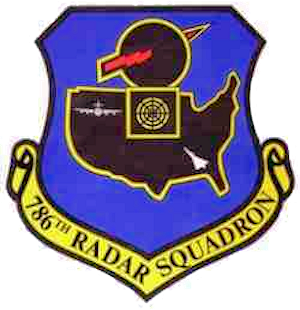
Emblem of the 786th Radar Squadron On a medium blue shield edged black, a black silhouetted map of the United States, bordered white, surmounted in the chief area of the shield by a black silhouetted radome edged white; an arrow piercing the radome, a radar scope on lower part of radome and two silhouetted aircraft in northwest and southeast corners respectively of the map, all white, details black. The emblem is symbolic of the Aircraft Control and Warning Mission in that electronic detection is indicated by the lightning bolt through the radome; surveillance and control is represented by the radar scope and aircraft and the map of the United States represents the Squadron's constant vigilance in safe-guarding our nation. emblem approved for use: 16 November 1956.

=== Units ===
- Constituted as the 786th Aircraft Control and Warning Squadron

Activated on 20 May 1951
Redesignated as 786th Radar Squadron (SAGE) on 15 July 1961
Redesignated as 786th Radar Squadron on 1 February 1974
Inactivated: 29 September 1979

=== Assignments ===
- 543d Aircraft Control and Warning Group, 20 May 1951
- 31st Air Division, 6 February 1952
- 29th Air Division, 16 February 1953
- Minot Air Defense Sector (Manual), 1 January 1961
- Great Falls Air Defense Sector, 25 June 1963
- 28th Air Division, 1 April 1966
- 24th Air Division, 19 November 1969 – 29 September 1979

=== Commanders ===
- Major Robert Friend: 20 May 1951 – 26 December 1951;
- Major James Larson: 26 December 1951 -unknown;
- Major Leroy Holen: unknown–14 March 1952;
- Major Edward Stauffer: 14 March 1952 – 16 April 1955;
- Major Halvden W. Thompson: 16 April 1955 – 8 June 1955;
- Major Leonard J. Schaitel: 8 June 1955 – 26 July 1957;
- Major George A. Middleton: 26 July 1957 – 1960;
- Major I. D. (Israel) Siegel: c.. 1960;
- Major A. J. Rantal: c.. 1960;
- Major Jacob F. Stevens: c.. 1963;
- Major Fred E. Small: c.. 1964–1966;
- Major Neal C. Brigham: c.. 1966;
- Major Raymond L. Graham: c.. 1967–2 January 1971;
- Major Gordon S. Bounds: c.. 1971–1972;
- Captain H. L. Dent: c.. 1972–20 July 1974;
- Major Joseph R. Cox: c.. 1974-1976;
- Major Bruce Smith: c.. 1978;
- Captain Ronald K. Trithart: c.. 1979;

== See also ==
- List of USAF Aerospace Defense Command General Surveillance Radar Stations
- List of United States Air Force aircraft control and warning squadrons
