= Baudette Air Force Station =

Closed US Air Force radar station near Baudette, Minnesota

Baudette Air Force Station
- Part of Air Defense Command

Site information
- Type: Air Force Station
- Code: ADC ID: SM-132, NORAD ID: Z-132
- Controlled by: United States Air Force

Location
- Location of Baudette AFS, Minnesota
- Coordinates: 48°40′12″N 094°37′07″W

Site history
- Built: 1958
- In use: 1958-1979

Garrison information
- Garrison: 692d Air Defense Group; 692d Aircraft Control and Warning Squadron (later Radar Squadron)

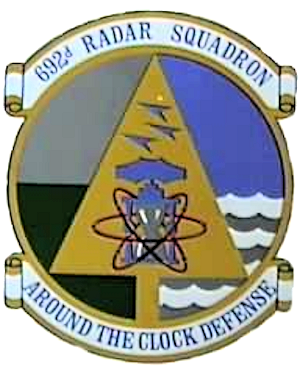
Emblem of the 692d Radar Squadron

Baudette Air Force Station is a closed United States Air Force General Surveillance Radar station. It is located 3.1 miles (5.0 km) south-southwest of Baudette, Minnesota. It was closed in 1979.

== History ==
Baudette Air Force Station was initially part of Phase II of the Air Defense Command Mobile Radar program. The Air Force approved this expansion of the Mobile Radar program on 23 October 1952. Radars in this network were designated "SM."

The station became operational on 1 October 1958 when the 692d Aircraft Control and Warning Squadron began operating an AN/FPS-3 and a pair of AN/FPS-6 height-finder radars, and initially the station functioned as a Ground-Control Intercept (GCI) and warning station. As a GCI station, the squadron's role was to guide interceptor aircraft toward unidentified intruders picked up on the unit's radar scopes.

During 1959 Baudette AFS joined the Semi Automatic Ground Environment (SAGE) system, feeding data to DC-10 at Duluth IAP, Minnesota. After joining, the squadron was redesignated as the 692d Radar Squadron (SAGE) on 15 December 1959. The radar squadron provided information around the clock to the SAGE Direction Center where it was analyzed to determine range, direction altitude speed and whether or not aircraft were friendly or hostile.

In 1962 Baudette received an AN/FPS-24 search radar, and during 1963 an AN/FPS-26A height-finder radar was installed, replacing one AN/FPS-6, and the other AN/FPS-6 height-finder radar was upgraded to an AN/FPS-90. On 31 July 1963, the site was redesignated as NORAD ID Z-132.

In addition to the main facility, Baudette operated the following AN/FPS-18 Gap Filler sites:

- Big Falls, MN (SM-132A) 48°11′26″N 093°47′30″W
- Middle River, MN (SM-132B) 48°32′09″N 096°00′54″W

Over the years, the equipment at the station was upgraded or modified to improve the efficiency and accuracy of the information gathered by the radars. The AN/FPS-90 height-finder radar was retired in late 1971.

The 692nd Radar Sq was inactivated and replaced by the 692d Air Defense Group in March 1970. The upgrade to group status was done because of Baudette AFS' status as a Backup Interceptor Control (BUIC) site. BUIC sites were alternate control sites in case SAGE Direction Centers became disabled and unable to control interceptor aircraft. The group was awarded the Air Force Outstanding Unit Award for exceptionally meritorious service for the period 1 June 1971 through 31 May 1973 The group was inactivated and replaced by the 692nd Radar Squadron as defenses against manned bombers were reduced. The group was disbanded in 1984. The 692d Radar Squadron was inactivated on 1 July 1979 as part of the phase-down of Aerospace Defense Command.

Today, the former Baudette Air Force Station is a cold-weather automobile test facility used by Acura. Many USAF buildings remain and in use and the station is well maintained, along with the large AN/FPS-24 search radar tower.

== Air Force units and assignments ==
=== Units ===
- Constituted as 692nd Aircraft Control and Warning Squadron

Activated at Snelling AFS, Minnesota, 8 August 1958 (not manned or equipped)
Moved to Baudette AFS on 1 October 1958
Redesignated 692nd Radar Squadron (SAGE) on 15 December 1959
Inactivated on 1 March 1970
Redesignated 692nd Radar Squadron on 1 January 1974
Activated on 17 January 1974
Inactivated on 1 July 1979

- Constituted as 692nd Air Defense Group on 13 February 1970

Activated on 1 March 1970
Inactivated on 17 January 1974
Disbanded on 27 September 1984

==== Awards ====
Award streamer	Award	Dates	Notes
	Air Force Outstanding Unit Award	692d Air Defense Group 1 June 1971 – 31 May 1973	

==== Commanders ====
- Lt Col. B.E. Thayer, 1 March 1970 - 1970
- Lt Col. Walter M. Adcock, 1970 - unknown
- Lt Col Carl A. Lindberg, 30 August 1961 - 3 August 1963 Source: That Officer's AF Form 11 (supplied by his oldest son, Carl A. Lindberg Jr.).

=== Assignments ===
- 31st Air Division, 1 October 1958
- 37th Air Division, 1 January 1959
- 30th Air Division, 1 April 1959
- Duluth Air Defense Sector, 1 July 1959
- 29th Air Division, 1 April 1966
- 23d Air Division, 19 November 1969 - 1 July 1979

== See also ==
- List of USAF Aerospace Defense Command General Surveillance Radar Stations
- List of United States Air Force aircraft control and warning squadrons
