= Grand Marais Air Force Station =

Closed United States Air Force General Surveillance Radar station

Grand Marais Air Force Station
- Part of Air Defense Command (ADC)

Site information
- Type: Air Force Station
- Controlled by: United States Air Force

Location
- Location of Grand Marais AFS, Michigan
- Coordinates: 46°39′49″N 85°59′03″W

Site history
- Built: 1954
- In use: 1954-1957

Garrison information
- Garrison: 906th Aircraft Control and Warning Squadron

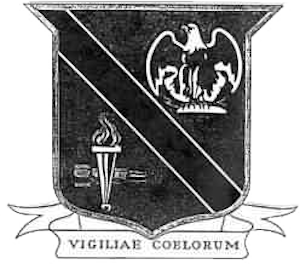
Emblem of the 906th Aircraft Control and Warning Squadron

Grand Marais Air Force Station (ADC ID: M-109) is a closed United States Air Force General Surveillance Radar station. It is located 0.5 miles (0.80 km) south of Grand Marais, Michigan. It was closed in 1957.

== History ==
Grand Marais Air Force Station was established in 1954 by Air Defense Command as one of a planned deployment of forty-four Mobile radar stations to support the permanent ADC Radar network in the United States sited around the perimeter of the country. This deployment was projected to be operational by mid-1952. Funding, constant site changes, construction, and equipment delivery delayed deployment.

This site became operational in December 1954 when the 906th Aircraft Control and Warning Squadron was moved to the new station from Willow Run AFS, Michigan. Operations began in early 1956, using an AN/TPS-1D radar, and initially the station functioned as a Ground-Control Intercept (GCI) and warning station. As a GCI station, the squadron's role was to guide interceptor aircraft toward unidentified intruders picked up on the unit's radar scopes.

Budget cuts closed the station in November 1957 and the 906th AC&W Squadron was inactivated. The station was transitioned into a "Gap Filler" unmanned site (P-66A), equipped with an AN/FPS-18 radar controlled by Sault Sainte Marie AFS, Michigan until 1968.

It was excessed to the GSA and conveyed to Mr. and Mrs. Willard Handrich, who use the site as a residence and the structures for storage purposes.

The communications and support equipment was apparently removed prior to the time of sale. Seven structures remained from the original base construction, including the enlisted men's barracks, officer's quarters, radar, power generation, and maintenance buildings and the well house. The well, which is located on the site, supplies the water system for the town of Grand Marais.

Superior Wood Products acquired the use of the property rights in 1960 and operated a sawmill and wood products manufacturing concern until 1966, when it went bankrupt and the property returned to Mr. Handrich. He operated a sawmill and wood products manufacturing concern, Grand Marais Industries, from 1966 to 1978. The sawmill utilized the former maintenance and vehicle storage building, to which another structure was added.

Today the site is overgrown and abandoned. A few foundations of torn down buildings are visible in aerial imagery, a few others are standing unused and deteriorating.

== Air Force units and assignments ==
=== Units ===
- Established as the 906th Aircraft Control and Warning Squadron

Activated at Willow Run AFS, Michigan on 23 May 1953 (not manned or equipped)
Moved to Grand Marais AFS on 1 December 1954
Inactivated on 30 November 1957

=== Assignments ===
- 30th Air Division, 23 May 1953
- 4706th Defense Wing, 1 December 1954
- 37th Air Division, 8 July 1956 – 30 November 1957

== See also ==
- List of USAF Aerospace Defense Command General Surveillance Radar Stations
