= Two Creeks Air Force Station =

United States Air Force Radar station

Two Creeks Air Force Station
- Part of Air Defense Command (ADC)

Site information
- Type: Air Force Station
- Controlled by: United States Air Force

Location
- Location of Two Creeks AFS, Wisconsin
- Coordinates: 44°19′28″N 087°34′45″W

Site history
- Built: 1954
- In use: 1954–1957

Garrison information
- Garrison: 700th Aircraft Control and Warning Squadron

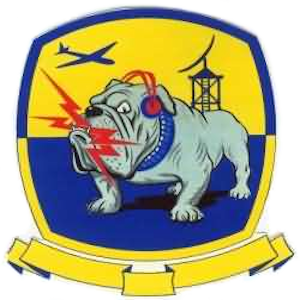
Emblem of the 700th Aircraft Control and Warning Squadron

Two Creeks Air Force Station (ADC ID: M-106) is a closed United States Air Force General Surveillance Radar station. It is located 0.7 miles (1.1 km) north-northwest of Two Creeks, Wisconsin. It was closed in 1957.

== History ==
Two Creeks Air Force Station was established in 1954 by Air Defense Command as one of a planned deployment of forty-four Mobile radar stations to support the permanent ADC Radar network in the United States sited around the perimeter of the country. This deployment was projected to be operational by mid-1952. Funding, constant site changes, construction, and equipment delivery delayed deployment.

This site became operational in December 1954 when the 700th Aircraft Control and Warning Squadron (AC&W Sq) was moved to the new station from Willow Run AFS, Michigan. Operations began in early 1956, using an AN/TPS-1D medium-range search radar, and initially the station functioned as a Ground-Control Intercept (GCI) and warning station. As a GCI station, the squadron's role was to guide interceptor aircraft toward unidentified intruders picked up on the unit's radar scopes.

Budget cuts closed the station on 30 November 1957 and the 700th AC&W Sq was inactivated. After its closure by the Air Force, the United States Army used Two Creeks AFS as a Nike Missile radar installation, operating an AN/FPS-36 search radar (modified AN/TPS-1D), designating the site as Tisch Mills, WI (CM-01R). The Army used the site briefly, then closed it in early 1959. The station was then transitioned into a "Gap Filler" unmanned site in August 1959 (P-19B), equipped with an AN/FPS-18 radar controlled by Antigo AFS, Wisconsin until June 1968.

While used as a trailer park for several years, in 2007, it was purchased by Paul Priester and is now an organic farm and orchard called Happy Destiny Farm, LLC.

== Air Force units and assignments ==
=== Units ===
- 700th Aircraft Control and Warning Squadron

Activated on 1 December 1953 at Grenier AFB, NH (not manned or equipped)
Moved to Willow Run AFS, MI (not manned or equipped) on 1 April 1954
Moved to Two Creeks AFS on 1 December 1954
Inactivated on 30 November 1957

=== Assignments ===
- 4706th Defense Wing, 1 December 1954
- 37th Air Division, 8 July 1956 – 30 November 1957

== See also ==
- List of USAF Aerospace Defense Command General Surveillance Radar Stations
