= Point Arena Air Force Station =

Closed United States Air Force General Surveillance Radar station

Point Arena Air Force Station
- Part of Air Defense Command (ADC)

Site information
- Type: Air Force Station
- Controlled by: United States Air Force

Location
- Location of Point Arena AFS, California
- Coordinates: 38°53′23″N 123°33′01″W

Site history
- Built: 1951
- In use: 1951–1998

Garrison information
- Garrison: 776th Aircraft Control and Warning Squadron

Point Arena Air Force Station (ADC ID: P-37, NORAD ID: Z-37) is a closed United States Air Force General Surveillance Radar station. It is located 3.7 miles (6.0 km) east of Point Arena, California. It was closed in 1998 by the Air Force, and turned over to the Federal Aviation Administration (FAA).

Today the site is part of the Joint Surveillance System (JSS), designated by NORAD as Western Air Defense Sector (WADS) Ground Equipment Facility J-34.

== History ==
Point Arena AFS was one of twenty-eight stations built as part of the second segment of the Air Defense Command permanent radar network. Prompted by the start of the Korean War, on 11 July 1950, the Secretary of the Air Force asked the Secretary of Defense for approval to expedite construction of the permanent network. Receiving the Defense Secretary's approval on 21 July, the Air Force directed the Corps of Engineers to proceed with construction. The station was originally located at Hill Peak Road (now Eureka Hill Road). Its Air Force Callsign was "Madam", designated as Lashup-Permanent site LP-37, operating an AN/TPS-1B radar.

The 776th Aircraft Control and Warning Squadron was activated on 27 November 1950 and operated AN/FPS-3 and AN/FPS-4 radars, and initially the station functioned as a Ground-Control Intercept (GCI) and warning station. As a GCI station, the squadron's role was to guide interceptor aircraft toward unidentified intruders picked up on the unit's radar scopes. In 1955 the 776th received an AN/FPS-8 that subsequently was converted to an AN/GPS-3. In 1958 AN/FPS-20 and AN/FPS-6 radars had replaced the original sets. An AN/FPS-6B joined the site in 1960.

In late 1960 Point Arena AFS joined the Semi Automatic Ground Environment (SAGE) system, feeding data to DC-18 at Beale AFB, California. After joining, the squadron was re-designated as the 776th Radar Squadron (SAGE) on 15 January 1961. The radar squadron provided information 24/7 the SAGE Direction Center where it was analyzed to determine range, direction altitude speed and whether or not aircraft were friendly or hostile. In August 1963, with the closure of the San Francisco Air Defense Sector, Point Arena was transferred to the SAGE Data Center (DC-13) at Adair AFS, Oregon.

Point Arena AFS replaced its AN/FPS-20 with an AN/FPS-24 radar in 1961 (the first production model). By 1963 the 776th Radar Squadron (SAGE) had replaced its AN/FPS-6 height-finder radars with AN/FPS-26A and AN/FPS-90 models. On 31 July, the site was re-designated as NORAD ID Z-37.

In addition to the main facility, Point Arena operated an AN/FPS-14 Gap Filler site: Laytonville, CA (P-37A) 39°41′13″N 123°34′56″W.

The 776th held additional responsibilities during the 1960s as Point Arena was designated as a Backup Intercept Control site for both the BUIC I and BUIC II programs. The AN/FPS-24 was replaced with an AN/FPS-93A model c. 1976. Over the years, the equipment at the station was upgraded or modified to improve the efficiency and accuracy of the information gathered by the radars. In 1979 Point Arena AFS came under Tactical Air Command (TAC) jurisdiction with the inactivation of Aerospace Defense Command and the creation of ADTAC.

Later in 1979 the station began operating AN/FPS-91A and AN/FPS-116 radars under the Joint Surveillance System (JSS) program. The 776th subsequently was inactivated on 30 September 1980 and an element of the 26th Air Defense Squadron continued operations. A reorganization in 1987 placed the site under the Southwest Air Defense Sector of the 25th Air Division. The site is now closed, replaced by FAA/USAF JSS site at Rainbow Ridge, CA (J-83A), with an ARSR-4 radar.

The road leading to the site was originally known as Hill Peak Road but at some point changed names to Eureka Hill Road. In addition to the site's radars, it also supplied ground-to-air communications to aircraft within its operating area. The radio equipment was located at the GATR (ground air transmitter and receiver) site, located at the crest of Eureka Hill Road, a few miles from the actual radar site. The GATR site was remotely located from the radar site to minimize interference from the radars into the radio gear.

The GATR site ground-air communications equipment used single frequency UHF AM transmitter/receiver pairs, AN/GRT-3 and AN/GRR-7, covering frequencies between 225-400MHz. AN/GRC-27 transceivers were used to temporarily replace defective equipment or for periodic maintenance. Additionally, a AN/KWT-6 transceiver provided communications to a gap-filler aircraft. A AN/GKA-5 Time Division Data Link and AN/FRT-49 data link amplifier transmitted data from the SAGE direction center back to any military aircraft in the coverage area. All equipment operated 24/7 and the site was staffed 24/7. This equipment list reflects what was in-service around 1968–69.

== Closure ==
Since the late 1990s the DoD has tried to give away the property to various local government agencies, but the cost of environmental cleanup (lead paint and asbestos) has limited interest in the property. Its remote location from major population centers also hurts its "marketability."

== See also ==
- List of United States Air Force aircraft control and warning squadrons
- United States general surveillance radar stations
