= Reno Air Defense Sector =

Reno Air Defense Sector

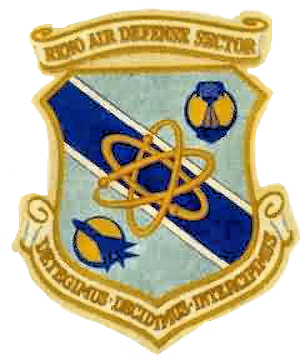
- Emblem of the Reno Air Defense Sector
- Active: 1959–1966
- Country: United States
- Branch: United States Air Force
- Role: Air Defense
- Part of: Air Defense Command

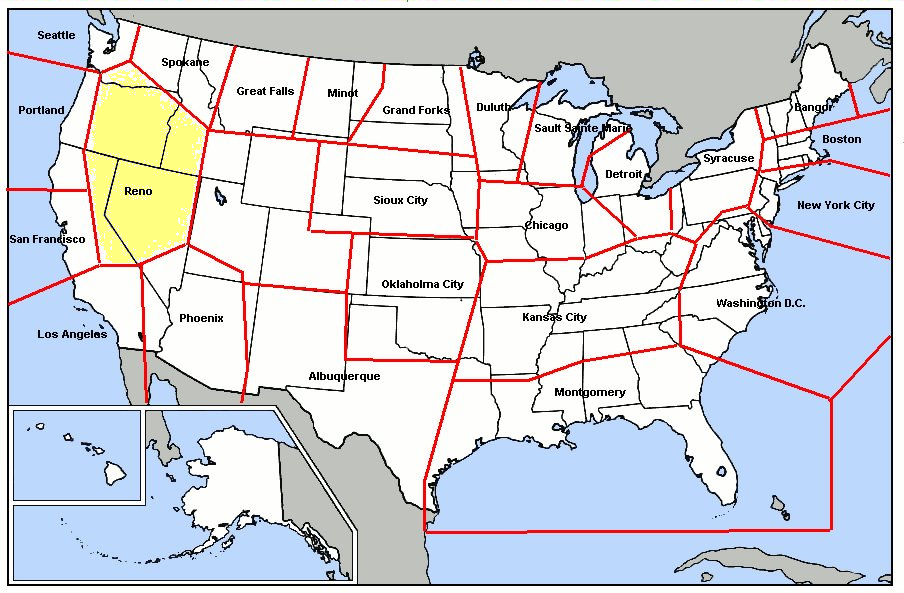
Map of Phoenix ADS

The Reno Air Defense Sector (ReADS) is an inactive United States Air Force organization. Its last assignment was with the 28th Air Division, being stationed at Stead Air Force Base, Nevada.

== History ==
ReADS was established in February 1959 assuming control of former ADC Western Air Defense Force units in Nevada, most of Oregon east of the Cascade Range; southwestern Idaho and areas of California east of the Sierra Nevada and the northern Central Valley. The organization provided command and control over several aircraft and radar squadrons.

On 15 February the new Semi Automatic Ground Environment (SAGE) Direction Center (DC-16) became operational. 39°39′04″N 119°53′00″W DC-16 was equipped with dual AN/FSQ-7 Computers. The day-to-day operations of the command was to train and maintain tactical flying units flying jet interceptor aircraft (F-94 Starfire; F-102 Delta Dagger; F-106 Delta Dart) in a state of readiness with training missions and series of exercises with SAC and other units simulating interceptions of incoming enemy aircraft.

The Sector was inactivated on 1 April 1966 as part of an ADC consolidation and reorganization; its units were reassigned to the 26th Air Division.

=== Lineage ===
- Established as Reno Air Defense Sector on 15 February 1959

Inactivated on 1 April 1966

=== Assignments ===
- 25th Air Division, 15 February 1959
- 28th Air Division, 1 July 1960 – 1 April 1966

=== Stations ===
- Stead AFB, Nevada, 15 February 1959 – 1 April 1966

=== Components ===
==== Radar squadrons ====
- 634th Radar Squadron

Burns AFS, Oregon, 15 September 1960 – 1 April 1966

- 658th Aircraft Control and Warning Squadron

Winnemucca AFS, Nevada, 15 September 1960 – 1 April 1966

- 821st Radar Squadron

Baker AFS, Oregon, 15 September 1960 – 1 April 1966

- 858th Radar Squadron

Fallon AFS, Nevada, 15 September 1960 – 1 April 1966

- 866th Radar Squadron

Tonopah AFS, Nevada, 15 September 1960 – 1 April 1966

== See also ==
External image
- SAGE facilities

- List of USAF Aerospace Defense Command General Surveillance Radar Stations
- Aerospace Defense Command Fighter Squadrons
