= Antigo Air Force Station =

Closed United States Air Force General Surveillance Radar station

Antigo Air Force Station
- Part of Air Defense Command (ADC)
- South-southwest of Antigo, Wisconsin
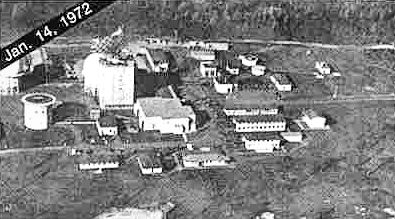
- USAF photo, 14 January 1972

Site information
- Type: Air Force Station
- Code: ADC ID: P-19, NORAD ID: Z-19
- Controlled by: United States Air Force

Location
- Coordinates: 45°02′54″N 089°14′02″W

Site history
- Built: 1951

Garrison information
- Garrison: 676th Aircraft Control and Warning Squadron

Location of Antigo AFS, Wisconsin

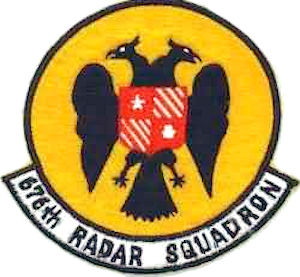
Emblem of the 676th Radar Squadron

Antigo Air Force Station is a closed United States Air Force General Surveillance Radar station. It is located 7.5 miles (12.1 km) south-southwest of Antigo, Wisconsin. It was closed in 1977 and is currently classified as a high risk toxic waste site involving groundwater, sediment, soil and surface water.

== History ==
In late 1951 Air Defense Command selected Antigo, Wisconsin site as one of twenty-eight radar stations built as part of the second segment of the permanent radar surveillance network. Prompted by the start of the Korean War, on 11 July 1950, the Secretary of the Air Force asked the Secretary of Defense for approval to expedite construction of the second segment of the permanent network. Receiving the Defense Secretary's approval on 21 July, the Air Force directed the Corps of Engineers to proceed with construction.

On 1 May 1951 the 676th Aircraft Control and Warning Squadron began operating an AN/FPS-3 search radar and an AN/FPS-4 height-finder radar in June 1952, and initially the station functioned as a Ground-Control Intercept (GCI) and warning station. As a GCI station, the squadron's role was to guide interceptor aircraft toward unidentified intruders picked up on the unit's radar scopes. At the end of 1958 Antigo was operating an AN/FPS-20 search radar and an AN/FPS-6 height-finder radar. A second AN/FPS-6B height-finder radar was added in 1959.

During 1960 Antigo AFS joined the Semi Automatic Ground Environment (SAGE) system, initially feeding data to DC-14 at K. I. Sawyer AFB, Michigan. After joining, the squadron was re-designated as the 676th Radar Squadron (SAGE) on 15 July 1960. The radar squadron provided information 24/7 the SAGE Direction Center where it was analyzed to determine range, direction altitude speed and whether or not aircraft were friendly or hostile. In June 1963, the SAGE feed was switched to DC-12 at McChord AFB. In October 1963, the data feed was switched to DC-10 at Duluth AFS, Minnesota and in June 1964 to DC-07 at Truax Field, Wisconsin.

During 1962 an AN/FPS-35 replaced the AN/FPS-20 set. On 31 July 1963, the site was redesignated as NORAD ID Z-19. The AN/FPS-6B was modified to an AN/FPS-90 in 1964. The AN/FPS-6 was also modified to an AN/FPS-90 in 1966. One AN/FPS-90 was retired in 1969.

In addition to the main facility, Antigo operated the following AN/FPS-18 Gap Filler sites:

- Norway, MI (P-19A) 45°47′19″N 087°52′06″W
- Two Creeks AFS, WI (P-19B) 44°19′25″N 087°34′47″W
- Brooks, WI (P-19C) 43°49′39″N 089°42′54″W

Over the years, the equipment at the station was upgraded or modified to improve the efficiency and accuracy of the information gathered by the radars.

In March 1977 the Air Force announced that the station would be closing due to what was called "redundancies with more strategically located radars". The 676th Radar Squadron (SAGE) was inactivated on 30 June 1977, and the facility was closed.

Today, Antigo Air Force Station remains abandoned, badly deteriorating 30 years after its inactivation.

== Toxic site ==
The United States Department of Defense classifies Antigo Air Force Station as a toxic waste site of high concern, involving both toxins and radiation.

== Air Force units and assignments ==
=== Units ===
- Established as 676th Aircraft Control and Warning Squadron

Activated on 1 May 1951
Redesignated 676th Radar Squadron (SAGE) on 15 July 1960
Redesignated 676th Radar Squadron on 1 February 1974
Inactivated on 30 June 1977

=== Assignments ===
- 543d Aircraft Control and Warning Group, 1 May 1951
- 31st Air Division, 6 February 1952
- Eastern Air Defense Force

4706th Defense Wing, 16 February 1953

- 37th Air Division, 8 July 1956
- 30th Air Division, 1 April 1959
- Sault Sainte Marie Air Defense Sector, 1 April 1960
- Duluth Air Defense Sector, 1 October 1963
- Chicago Air Defense Sector, 1 June 1964
- 20th Air Division, 1 April 1966
- 30th Air Division, 1 December 1967
- 34th Air Division, 1 July 1968
- 29th Air Division, 14 November 1969 – 30 June 1977

== See also ==
- United States general surveillance radar stations
