= Madera Air Force Station =

Closed United States Air Force General Surveillance Radar station

Madera Air Force Station
- Part of Air Defense Command (ADC)

Site information
- Type: Air Force Station
- Controlled by: United States Air Force

Location
- Location of Madera AFS, California
- Coordinates: 37°02′07″N 120°01′59″W

Site history
- Built: 1950
- In use: 1950–1966

Garrison information
- Garrison: 774th Aircraft Control and Warning Squadron

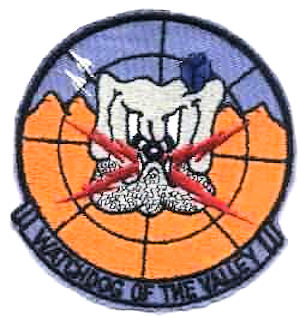
Emblem of the 774th Radar Squadron

Madera Air Force Station (ADC ID: P-74, NORAD ID: Z-74) is a closed United States Air Force General Surveillance Radar station. It is located 5.2 miles (8.4 km) north-northeast of Madera, California. It was closed in 1966.

== History ==
Madera AFS was one of twenty-eight stations built as part of the second segment of the Air Defense Command permanent radar network. Prompted by the start of the Korean War, on 11 July 1950, the Secretary of the Air Force asked the Secretary of Defense for approval to expedite construction of the permanent network. Receiving the Defense Secretary's approval on 21 July, the Air Force directed the Corps of Engineers to proceed with construction.

The 774th Aircraft Control and Warning Squadron was activated at the new station on 27 November 1950, and assumed the coverage of a temporary "Lashup" site at Fort MacArthur (L-43) operating an AN/TPS-1B radar, and initially the station functioned as a Ground-Control Intercept (GCI) and warning station. As a GCI station, the squadron's role was to guide interceptor aircraft toward unidentified intruders picked up on the unit's radar scopes.

The squadron began operating AN/FPS-3 and AN/FPS-4 radars from Madera AFS in January 1952. In 1958 the height-finder radar was replaced by AN/FPS-6 and AN/FPS-6A radars. In 1959 an AN/FPS-20 search radar superseded the AN/FPS-3. In 1960 the Air Force upgraded an AN/FPS-6A to become a -6B.

During 1961 Madera AFS joined the Semi Automatic Ground Environment (SAGE) system, feeding data to DC-18 at Beale AFB, California. After joining, the squadron was redesignated as the 774th Radar Squadron (SAGE) on 15 January 1961. The radar squadron provided information 24/7 the SAGE Direction Center where it was analyzed to determine range, direction altitude speed and whether or not aircraft were friendly or hostile. In August 1963, the SAGE data feed was reassigned to DC-17 at Norton AFB.

The Air Force upgraded the search radar, first to an AN/FPS-20A, and then to an AN/FPS-66. By 1963 this AN/FPS-66 search radar operated in conjunction with AN/FPS-6 and AN/FPS-90 height-finder radars, and on 31 July 1963, the site was redesignated as NORAD ID Z-74.

Reductions in ADC funding led to Madera Air Force Station being inactivated on 25 June 1966. Today, the site remains largely intact, although at some point, the radar towers had been removed. When the station was shut down, it was handed over to a Native American group which operated the property as a vocational technology center. The site was sold off to someone else & used for unknown purposes, and then the current owner bought it in the late 1980s or early 1990s.

== Air Force units and assignments ==
=== Units ===
- Constituted as the 774th Aircraft Control and Warning Squadron on 14 November 1950

Activated at Madera AFS on 27 November 1950
Redesignated 774th Radar Squadron (SAGE) on 15 January 1961
Discontinued and inactivated on 25 June 1966

=== Assignments ===
- 542d Aircraft Control and Warning Group, 27 November 1950
- 28th Air Division, 6 February 1952
- San Francisco Air Defense Sector, 1 July 1960
- Los Angeles Air Defense Sector, 1 August 1963
- 26th Air Division, 1 April 1966 – 25 June 1966

== See also ==
- List of United States Air Force aircraft control and warning squadrons
- United States general surveillance radar stations
