= Dickinson Air Force Station =

Closed United States Air Force General Surveillance Radar station

Dickinson Air Force Station
- Part of Air Defense Command (ADC)
- Stark County, northeast of Dickinson, North Dakota

Site information
- Type: Air Force station
- Code: ADC ID: TM-177 NORAD ID: Z-177
- Controlled by: United States Air Force

Location
- Location of Dickinson AFS, North Dakota
- Coordinates: 46°55′14″N 102°43′56″W

Site history
- In use: April 1959–March 1965

Garrison information
- Garrison: 706th Radar Squadron

Dickinson Air Force Station is a closed United States Air Force General Surveillance Radar station. It is located 3.8 miles (6.1 km) northeast of Dickinson, North Dakota. It was closed in 1965.

== History ==
Dickinson Air Force Station came into existence as part of Phase III of the Air Defense Command Mobile Radar program. On 20 October 1953 ADC requested a third phase of twenty-five radar sites be constructed. It became active in April 1959.

The 706th Aircraft Control and Warning Squadron activated with AN/FPS-3 search and AN/FPS-6A height-finder radars, and initially the station functioned as a Ground-Control Intercept (GCI) and warning station. As a GCI station, the squadron's role was to guide interceptor aircraft toward unidentified intruders picked up on the unit's radar scopes. A second AN/FPS-6A height-finder radar was added in 1960.

During 1961 Dickinson AFS joined the Semi Automatic Ground Environment (SAGE) system, initially feeding data to DC-20 at Malmstrom AFB, Montana. After joining, the squadron was re-designated as the 706th Radar Squadron (SAGE) on 15 July 1961. The radar squadron provided information 24/7 the SAGE Direction Center where it was analyzed to determine range, direction altitude speed and whether or not aircraft were friendly or hostile. By 1963 the radars had been upgraded to AN/FPS-66 search and AN/FPS-90 height-finder radars, and on 31 July 1963, the site was redesignated as NORAD ID Z-177.

In addition to the main facility, Dickinson operated three unmanned AN/FPS-18 Gap Filler sites:

- Glendive, MT (TM-177A) 47°02′39″N 104°40′54″W
- Alexander, ND (TM-177B) 47°40′43″N 103°46′50″W
- McIntosh, SD (TM-177C) 45°56′31″N 101°23′17″W

All three Gap Filler sites remain with both the radar towers and support structures intact. The Alexander site is now home to the Watford City Joint Surveillance System (ARSR-4) LRR site (Z-300/J-76).

Dickinson was removed from service on 1 March 1965. The 706th Radar Squadron (SAGE) was inactivated 25 June 1965.

Today the station is abandoned, being demolished.

== Buildings and facilities ==
Buildings on the station include:

- Family Housing
- Club and Gymnasium
- Telephony Kiosk
- Search Radar Tower
- Height Finder Radar Tower
- (3) Radomes
- Heating Plant
- Bachelor Officers Quarters (BOQ)
- Barracks
- Operations Building
- Squadron Headquarters building
- Administration building
- Power building (also known as the "Diesel Building")

One interesting fact about the main station is that the family housing area is approximately one mile west of the operations buildings. The Ground to Air Transmitter-Receiver (GATR) facility was located off-station at 46°56′07″N 102°43′54″W, approximately 2700' elevation AMSL, roughly 3 miles north of the main station.

== Air Force units and assignments ==
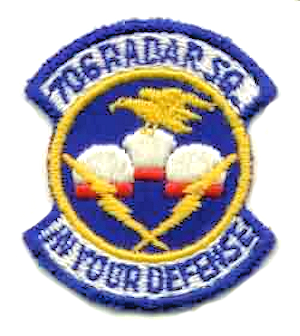
Emblem of the 706th Radar Squadron

=== Units ===
- 706th Aircraft Control and Warning Squadron

Activated at Malmstrom AFB, Montana, (P-83) on 8 December 1957 (not manned or equipped)
Assigned to Dickinson AFS on 1 July 1958
Redesignated 706th Radar Squadron (SAGE) on 15 July 1961
Discontinued and inactivated on 25 June 1965

Assignments:

- 29th Air Division, 1 July 1958
- Minot Air Defense Sector (Manual), 1 January 1961
- Great Falls Air Defense Sector, 25 June 1963 – 25 June 1965

== See also ==
- List of USAF Aerospace Defense Command General Surveillance Radar Stations
- List of United States Air Force aircraft control and warning squadrons
