= San Francisco Air Defense Sector =

San Francisco Air Defense Sector

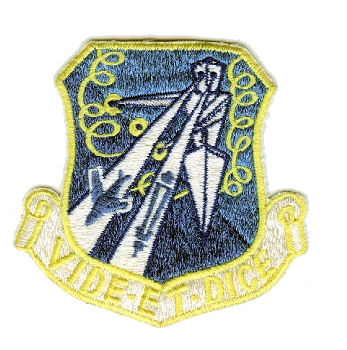
- Emblem of the San Francisco Air Defense Sector
- Active: 1959–1963
- Country: United States
- Branch: United States Air Force
- Role: Air Defense
- Part of: Air Defense Command

Commanders
- Notable commanders: Carroll W. McColpin

The San Francisco Air Defense Sector (SFADS) is an inactive United States Air Force organization. Its last assignment was with the 28th Air Division, being stationed at Beale Air Force Base, California.

The sector was established in February 1959 assuming control of former ADC Western Air Defense Force units in California west of the Sierra Nevada; north of Santa Barbara and south of Eureka. The organization controlled several aircraft and radar squadrons.

On 1 December 1960 the new Semi Automatic Ground Environment (SAGE) Direction Center (DC-18) became operational. 39°06′35″N 121°23′49″W DC-18 was equipped with dual AN/FSQ-7 Computers. The day-to-day operations of the command was to train and maintain tactical flying units flying jet interceptor aircraft (F-94 Starfire; F-102 Delta Dagger; F-106 Delta Dart); (2 F-101B Voodoo Squadrons) in a state of readiness with training missions and series of exercises with SAC and other units simulating interceptions of incoming enemy aircraft.

The 83d Fighter-Interceptor Squadron and 84th Fighter-Interceptor Squadron at Hamilton AFB, Ca., both were part of the sector's forces, under the command of the 78th Fighter Wing.

The Sector was inactivated on 1 August 1963 as part of an ADC consolidation and reorganization; and its units were assigned to 28th Air Division at Hamilton Air Force Base, California.

== Lineage ==
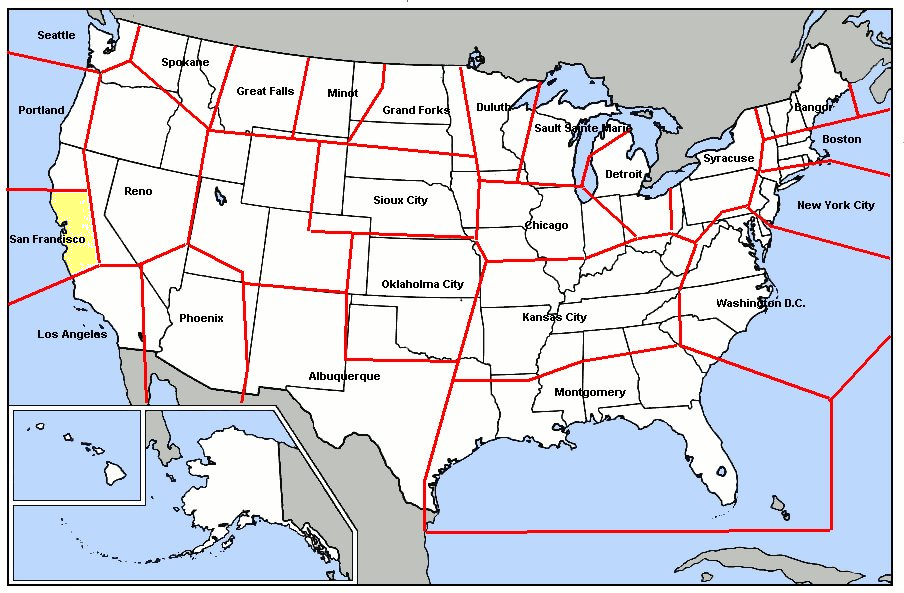
Map of San Francisco ADS

- Established as San Francisco Air Defense Sector on 15 February 1959

Inactivated on 1 August 1963

== Assignments ==
- 28th Air Division, 15 February 1959 – 1 August 1963

== Stations ==
- Beale AFB, California, 15 February 1959 – 1 August 1963

== Components ==
- 78th Fighter Wing (Air Defense)

Hamilton AFB, California, 1 July 1960 – 1 August 1963

=== Interceptor squadrons ===
External image
- Ground Air Transmit Receive site (recent)

- 82d Fighter-Interceptor Squadron

Travis AFB, California, 1 July 1960 – 1 August 1963

- 456th Fighter-Interceptor Squadron

Castle AFB, California, 1 July 1960 – 1 August 1963

=== Radar squadrons ===
- 634th Radar Squadron

Burns AFS, Oregon, 1 July 1960 – 1 September 1960

- 658th Aircraft Control and Warning Squadron

Winnemucca AFS, Nevada, 1 July 1960 – 1 September 1961

- 666th Radar Squadron

Mill Valley AFS, California, 1 July 1960 – 1 August 1963

- 668th Aircraft Control and Warning Squadron

Mather AFB, California, 1 July 1960 – 1 September 1961

- 682d Radar Squadron

Almaden AFS, California, 1 July 1960 – 1 August 1963

- 774th Radar Squadron

Madera AFS, California, 1 July 1960 – 1 August 1963

- 776th Radar Squadron

Point Arena AFS, California, 1 July 1960 – 1 August 1963

- 821st Radar Squadron

Baker AFS, Oregon, 1 July-15 September 1960

- 858th Radar Squadron

Fallon AFS, Nevada, 1 July-15 September 1960

- 866th Radar Squadron

Tonopah AFS, Nevada, 1 July-15 September 1960

== See also ==
- List of USAF Aerospace Defense Command General Surveillance Radar Stations
- Aerospace Defense Command Fighter Squadrons
