= Carmi Air Force Station =

Closed United States Air Force General Surveillance Radar station

Carmi Air Force Station
- Part of Air Defense Command (ADC)

Site information
- Type: Air Force Station
- Controlled by: United States Air Force

Location
- Location of Carmi AFS, Illinois
- Coordinates: 38°05′40″N 088°07′01″W

Site history
- Built: 1956
- In use: 1956-1957

Garrison information
- Garrison: 704th Aircraft Control and Warning Squadron

Carmi Air Force Station (ADC ID: SM-137) is a closed United States Air Force General Surveillance Radar station. It is located 2.3 miles (3.7 km) east of Carmi, Illinois. It was closed in 1957.

== History ==
Carmi Air Force Station was initially part of Phase II of the Air Defense Command Mobile Radar program. The Air Force approved this expansion of the Mobile Radar program on 23 October 1952. Radars in this network were designated "SM."

Prior to 1955, the site was used as farmland. The 12.5-acre (0.0195 mi^{2}) site was conveyed to the United States by Warranty Deed, dated 19 March 1955, and to be under the control of the U.S. Air Force. The station became operational on 1 July 1955 when the 704th Aircraft Control and Warning Squadron was moved to Carmi from Willow Run AFS, MI. The squadron operated an AN/TPS-1D radar set. The station functioned as a "slave site" ("manned gap-filler") to the 784th Aircraft Control and Warning Squadron at Snow Mountain AFS, KY.

Closed due to budgetary cuts on 1 November 1957. It was scheduled to become an unmanned gap-filler radar site P-70A, but did not. On 5 September 1958, the Air Force declared the 12.5-acre (0.0195 mi^{2}) site excess and transferred it, along with all buildings and personal property located on the site at the time of transfer to the General Services Administration (GSA).

GSA conveyed the site to Wayne Industries, Inc. by Quitclaim Deed dated 1 December 1958, which included all buildings and personal property located on the site. GSA took back a Purchase Money Mortgage from the Grantee effective 10 October 1958. A perpetual easement for ingress and egress to maintain and operate power lines and other utility services was maintained by the Government. In March 1959 Wayne Industries, Inc. was declared in default on the mortgage note and subsequently foreclosure proceeding followed.

On 22 January 1960, GSA transferred the site, by Assignment of Purchase Money Order, to Carmi Industrial Sites Corporation, then known as Carmi Industrial Association. They rented out the structures for warehouse storage, auto repair garages, and a machine shop. The northern portion of the property was being rented for agricultural purposes. Most of the former USAF buildings remain today, many appear to be overgrown with vegetation and deteriorating.

== Air Force units and assignments ==
=== Units ===
- 704th Aircraft Control and Warning Squadron, Assigned on 1 July 1955

Activated at Willow Run AFS (P-23), MI, 1 March 1955
Inactivated on 1 November 1957

=== Assignments ===
- 4706th Air Defense Wing, 1 July 1955
- 58th Air Division, 1 March 1956 – 1 November 1957

== See also ==
- List of USAF Aerospace Defense Command General Surveillance Radar Stations
