= Winnemucca Air Force Station =

Military surveillance station in the US

Winnemucca Air Force Station
- Part of Air Defense Command (ADC)
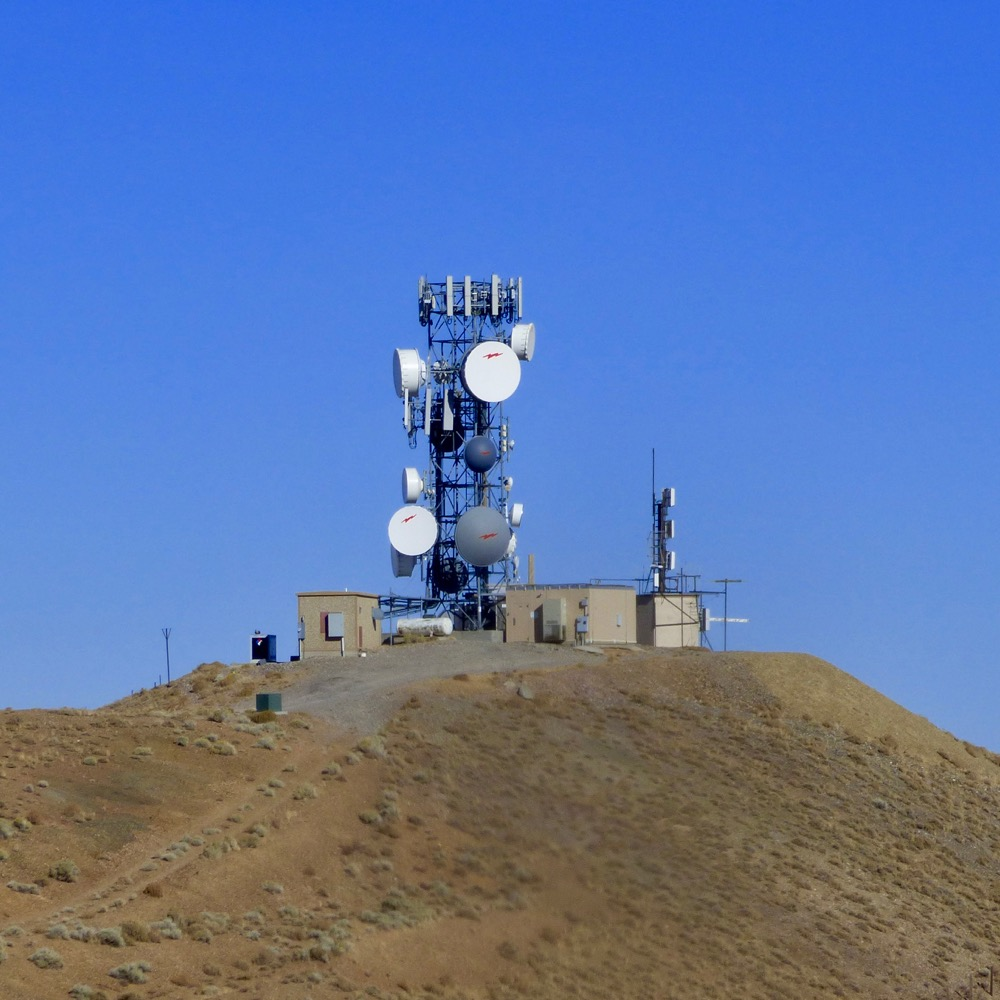
- Former radio site

Site information
- Type: Air Force Station
- Controlled by: United States Air Force

Location
- Location of Winnemucca AFS, Nevada
- Coordinates: 41°00′40″N 117°46′03″W

Site history
- Built: 1956
- In use: 1956-1968

Garrison information
- Garrison: 658th Aircraft Control and Warning Squadron

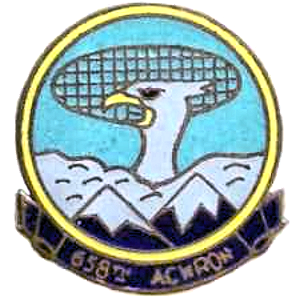
Emblem of the 658th Radar Squadron

Winnemucca Air Force Station (ADC ID: M-127, NORAD ID: Z-127) is a closed United States Air Force General Surveillance Radar station. It is located 3.1 miles (5.0 km) north-northwest of Winnemucca, Nevada. It was closed in 1968.

== History ==
Winnemucca Air Force Station was established as part of the planned deployment by Air Defense Command of forty-four Mobile radar stations across the United States to support the permanent Radar network established during the Cold War for air defense of the United States. This deployment had been projected to be operational by mid-1952. Funding, constant site changes, construction, and equipment delivery delayed deployment. Winnemucca AFS typified some of the problems with the mobile radar program. Because the program received minimal funding, the cantonment area was sited on Department of the Interior land located several miles away from the radar, rather than on adjacent land owned by the Southern Pacific Land Company. Delays in the decision-making process set the date for beneficial occupancy back to 1955.

The station was activated on 8 June 1955 after the 658th Aircraft Control and Warning Squadron was moved to the new station on 1 February 1956 by the 28th Air Division. Operational status was finally achieved by the 658th AC&W Squadron in 1956. The site used an AN/FPS-3 radar, and initially the station functioned as a Ground-Control Intercept (GCI) and warning station. As a GCI station, the squadron's role was to guide interceptor aircraft toward unidentified intruders picked up on the unit's radar scopes.

By 1959 this radar had been joined by a pair of AN/FPS-6B height-finder radars. In 1960 the AN/FPS-3 was replaced by an AN/FPS-20 search set. At the end of 1961 this search set had been upgraded into an AN/FPS-66. During 1961 Winnemucca AFS joined the Semi Automatic Ground Environment (SAGE) system, initially feeding data to DC-21 at Stead AFB, Nevada. After joining, the squadron was re-designated as the 658th Radar Squadron (SAGE) on 1 March 1961. The radar squadron provided information 24/7 the SAGE Direction Center where it was analyzed to determine range, direction altitude speed and whether or not aircraft were friendly or hostile.

In 1963 the two height-finder radars were converted to AN/FPS-90 units, and on 31 July 1963, the site was redesignated as NORAD ID Z-127. In 1967 one AN/FPS-90 was removed from service.

In addition to the main facility, Winnemucca operated several AN/FPS-14 Gap Filler sites:

- Quinn River Crossing, NV (M-127A): 41°27′57″N 118°17′00″W
- Unionville, NV (M-127B): 40°33′45″N 118°03′08″W

The 658th Radar Squadron (SAGE) was inactivated on 18 June 1968 as a result of budget restrictions, and the general phase down of air defense radar stations. The former station is now a commercial transmitter site, the former Air Force radar towers still standing. Some of the support buildings at the site are standing in deteriorated condition.

A number of former Air Force buildings (including Quonset huts) in the Cantonment and barracks areas 40°59′28″N 117°44′25″Ware in use by Humboldt County and commercial firms, and the pool is now open to the public (in season). Some buildings have also been built since the Air Force closed the base. The Officers' Quarters area houses are now used as private housing. The area is now known as "Sage Heights," a reference to the area's history.

== Air Force units and assignments ==
Units:

- 658th Aircraft Control and Warning Squadron, Assigned 1 February 1956

Activated by 503d Aircraft Control and Warning Group, Mitchel AFB, New York, 1 January 1951
Re-assigned to Santini, New York, 1 October 1951
Inactivated 2 January 1952
Reactivated by 28th Air Division, Hamilton AFB, California, 20 June 1953

Re-Designated 658th Radar Squadron (SAGE), 1 March 1961
Discontinued on 18 June 1968

Assignments:

- 28th Air Division, 1 February 1956
- San Francisco Air Defense Sector, 1 July 1960
- Reno Air Defense Sector, 15 September 1960
- 26th Air Division, 1 April 1966 – 18 June 1968

== See also ==
- List of USAF Aerospace Defense Command General Surveillance Radar Stations
