= Tonopah Air Force Station =

Radar station in Nevada, US 1956–1970

Tonopah Air Force Station
- Part of Air Defense Command (ADC)

Site information
- Type: Air Force Station
- Controlled by: United States Air Force

Location
- Location of Tonopah AFS, Nevada
- Coordinates: 38°03′06″N 117°13′32″W

Site history
- Built: 1956
- In use: 1956-1970

Garrison information
- Garrison: 866th Aircraft Control and Warning Squadron

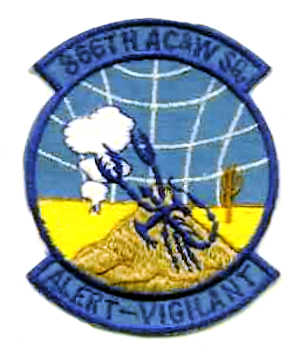
Emblem of the 866th Radar Squadron

Tonopah Air Force Station (ADC ID: SM-164, NORAD ID: Z-164) is a closed United States Air Force General Surveillance Radar station. It is located 1.1 miles (1.8 km) south of Tonopah, Nevada. It was closed in 1970.

== History ==
Tonopah Air Force Station was initially part of Phase II of the Air Defense Command Mobile Radar program. The Air Force approved this expansion of the Mobile Radar program on 23 October 1952. Radars in this network were designated "SM."

The station became operational on 1 October 1956 when the 866th Aircraft Control and Warning Squadron was moved to the new station, and initially the station functioned as a Ground-Control Intercept (GCI) and warning station. As a GCI station, the squadron's role was to guide interceptor aircraft toward unidentified intruders picked up on the unit's radar scopes. In 1957 the 866th AC&W Squadron activated an AN/MPS-7 radar and operated manually.

In June 1961 the site was moved to another peak and joined the Semi Automatic Ground Environment (SAGE) system, initially feeding data to DC-21 at Stead AFB, Nevada. After joining, the squadron was re-designated as the 866th Radar Squadron (SAGE) on 1 July 1961. The radar squadron provided information 24/7 the SAGE Direction Center where it was analyzed to determine range, direction altitude speed and whether or not aircraft were friendly or hostile. In addition, the 866th Radar Squadron operated a pair of AN/FPS-6 height-finder and AN/FPS-7C search radars. In 1963 the height-finder radars were converted to AN/FPS-90 sets, and on 31 July 1963, the site was redesignated as NORAD ID Z-164.

One AN/FPS-90 was retired in 1969. The Air Force inactivated the 866th Radar Squadron 1 July 1970 as a result of budget restrictions, and the general phase-down of air defense radar stations.

However, during the 1970s, a site near the former radar station was used by the Air Force as part of the Foreign Technology Evaluation program being conducted at nearby Tonopah Test Range Airport. A "Bar Lock" search radar from the Soviet Union was installed at the former Tonopah AFS GATR site 38°08′37″N 117°11′57″W to evaluate the Soviet Air Defense System. It was a very valuable tool use for many things. The Air Force needed to develop all the interfacing equipment in order to use the data in remote locations. Great care was taken not do anything to change the characteristics of the radar itself. Much equipment was duplicated and placed in different locations to complete the ground environment, which turned out to be a great training facility.

Today, the former Tonopah AFS is a commercial transmitter site. A few old Air Force buildings are still in use for other uses. The FAA radar uses two out of the three former USAF RADAR platforms.

== Air Force units and assignments ==
=== Units ===
- Constituted as the 866th Aircraft Control and Warning Squadron

Activated at Hamilton AFB, California on 8 November 1954
Inactivated on 15 December 1954
Activated at Hamilton AFB, CA on 9 October 1955
Moved to Tonopah AFS on 1 October 1956
Redesignated 866th Radar Squadron (SAGE) on 1 July 1961
Inactivated on 1 July 1970

=== Assignments ===
- 28th Air Division, 1 October 1956
- San Francisco Air Defense Sector, 1 July 1960
- Reno Air Defense Sector, 15 September 1960
- 26th Air Division, 1 April 1966
- 27th Air Division, 15 September 1969
- 26th Air Division, 19 November 1969 – 1 July 1970

== See also ==
- List of USAF Aerospace Defense Command General Surveillance Radar Stations
