= 668th Aircraft Control and Warning Squadron =

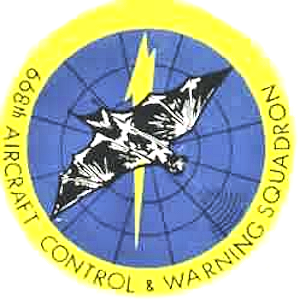
- Emblem of the 668th Aircraft Control and Warning Squadron
- Active: 1949–1961
- Country: United States
- Branch: United States Air Force
- Type: General Radar Surveillance

The 668th Aircraft Control and Warning Squadron is an inactive United States Air Force unit. It was last assigned to the San Francisco Air Defense Sector, Air Defense Command, stationed at Mather Air Force Base, California. It was inactivated on 1 September 1961.

The unit was a General Surveillance Radar squadron providing for the air defense of the United States.

== Lineage ==
- Established as 668th Aircraft Control and Warning Squadron

Activated on 8 December 1949
Discontinued and inactivated on 1 September 1961

Assignments

- 542d Aircraft Control and Warning Group, 8 December 1949
- 28th Air Division, 6 February 1952
- San Francisco Air Defense Sector, 1 July 1960 – 1 September 1961

Stations

- Hamilton AFB, California, 8 December 1949
- Mather AFB, California, 10 January 1951 – 1 September 1961
