= 858th Radar Squadron =

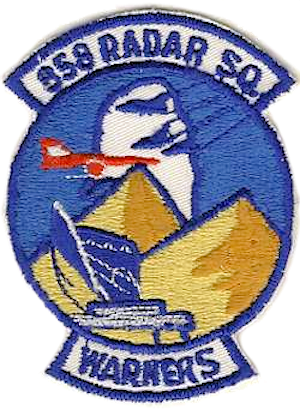
- Emblem of the 858th Radar Squadron
- Active: 1955-1970, 1974-1975
- Country: United States
- Branch: United States Air Force
- Type: General Radar Surveillance

The 858th Radar Squadron is an inactive United States Air Force unit. It was last assigned to the 26th Air Division, Aerospace Defense Command, stationed at Fallon Air Force Station (Naval Air Station Fallon), Nevada. It was inactivated on 30 June 1975.

The unit was a General Surveillance Radar squadron providing for the air defense of the United States.

Lineage

- Established as the 858th Aircraft Control and Warning Squadron

Activated on 8 October 1955
Redesignated 858th Radar Squadron (SAGE) on 1 December 1962
Inactivated on 1 March 1970
Redesignated 858th Radar Squadron on 1 January 1974
Activated on 17 January 1974
Inactivated on 30 June 1975

Assignments

- 28th Air Division, 8 October 1955
- San Francisco Air Defense Sector, 1 July 1960
- Reno Air Defense Sector, 15 September 1960
- 26th Air Division, 1 April 1966
- 27th Air Division, 15 September 1969
- 26th Air Division, 19 November 1969 - 1 March 1970
- 26th Air Division, 17 January 1974 - 30 June 1975

Stations

- Hamilton AFB, California, 8 October 1955
- Fallon AFS (NAS Fallon), Nevada, 1 January 1956 - 1 March 1970
- Fallon AFS (NAS Fallon), Nevada, 17 January 1974 - 30 June 1975
