= RCAF Station Puntzi Mountain =

Closed U.S. and Canadian Air Force base

Location
- Coordinates: 52°09′42″N 124°12′24″W

Site history
- Built: 1952
- In use: 1952-1966

Garrison information
- Garrison: USAF - 917th Aircraft Control and Warning Squadron (1952-1962); RCAF - 55 Aircraft Control & Warning Squadron (1962-1966)

RCAF Station Puntzi Mountain (ADC ID: C-19) is a closed United States Air Force (USAF) and Royal Canadian Air Force (RCAF) General Surveillance radar station. It was located in Canada 200 miles north of Vancouver, British Columbia.

Located 117 road miles west of Williams Lake and 200 air miles north of Vancouver, in the Chilcotin area of the Cariboo, RCAF Station Puntzi Mountain was located a mile off the highway near a small settlement known as Puntziville. While the radar station was active, civilian employees of the station lived in Puntziville.

== History ==
The area had first been settled by prospectors. After mining declined, cattle ranching became a livelihood for those who remained in the area.

In the late 1940s, Puntzi Mountain was selected as a radar site, and a Canadian contractor was selected to build the site with U.S. government funding. Construction began in the spring of 1950 and the radar station was completed and accepted in May 1952. The site was operated by the 917th Aircraft Control & Warning Squadron of the United States Air Forceas a Ground-Control Intercept (GCI) station and became operational in July 1952. As originally configured, the station had FPS-3C, FPS-502, and FPS-6 radars. It was designated as Puntzi Mountain Air Station while operated by the USAF. A hundred USAF personnel and several RCAF members were assigned to the station.

Puntzi Mountain was established as part of the Pinetree Line, a component of the North American Air Defense Command(NORAD).

During its service, the radars were upgraded to FPS-7C/FPS-107, FPS-26 radars while keeping the FPS-6.

On 1 November 1962, the 55th Aircraft Control & Warning Squadron of the RCAF assumed administrative duties at the station and by 1 February 1963 the entire station was operated by RCAF personnel. During 1963 the station began SAGE testing and had full SAGE capability and operations on 23 March 1964. The Puntzi Mountain station was the seventh of eleven Group II sites transferred to the RCAF. After being transferred to the RCAF, it was known as RCAF Station Puntzi Mountain.

Building 2, known as Cariboo Hall housed the mess halls, Exchange Branch and library. Cariboo Hall was also home to CFPM, Puntzi Mountain's own radio station. In addition to the radio station, the station personnel enjoyed ample outdoor activities. The station had a theater, bowling alley and curling rink.

An emergency airstrip was located at Puntzi Mountain for CF-100 aircraft, and also used by USAF Beaver aircraft assigned to the radar site. Later, when the RCAF operated Puntzi Mountain, an Otter was assigned to support the site. The Otter was used for medical evacuations, personnel transport, search and rescue, and other duties as directed by the station commander.

The ground Search and Rescue Team from the station was assigned to assist the RCMP with recovering evidence and bodies from a July 9, 1965 crash of a Canadian Pacific Airline's DC-6.

RCAF Station Puntzi Mountain ceased radar reporting on 1 October 1966. The station closed shortly after.

== Current status ==
The former RCAF Station Puntzi Mountain airstrip is now the Puntzi Mountain Airport. In 1970-71 most of the station was demolished by a contractor. The only remaining buildings are the former guard shack and garage.
