= 634th Radar Squadron =

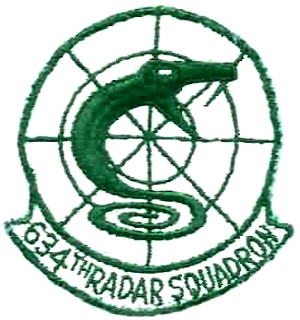
- Emblem of the 634th Radar Squadron
- Active: 1947-1952, 1953-1974
- Country: United States
- Branch: United States Air Force
- Type: General Radar Surveillance

The 634th Radar Squadron is an inactive United States Air Force unit. It was last assigned to the 20th Air Division, Aerospace Defense Command, stationed at Lake Charles Air Force Station, Louisiana. It was inactivated on 1 July 1974.

== History ==
The unit was a General Surveillance Radar squadron providing for the air defense of the United States. It was first activated at McChord AFB, WA as an aircraft control squadron to operate the 505th Aircraft Control & Warning Group's Air Defense Control Center for the Provisional Northwestern Air Defense Sector. It soon moved to the Lashup radar site L-31 at Everett, WA (later Paine Field) and added the detection and control mission as well. It was inactivated in the general reorganization of Air Defense Command (ADC) in February 1952. It was soon reactivated and performed the same mission at the mobile site M-118 at Burns AFS, OR. Became part of the Semi Automatic Ground Environment system in 1962. Inactivated in 1970.

The Squadron was activated again in 1973 to replace Operating Location F of the 630th Radar Squadron at Lake Charles AFS as part of the Southern Air Defense System (SADS). SADS had been established because of the inadequacy of the radar coverage to the south of the United States that had been dramatically illustrated whan a Cuban MiG-17 went undetected before it landed at Homestead AFB, and two years later, an An-24 similarly arrived unannounced at New Orleans International Airport. As a result, ADC established SADS with the squadron operating a manual control center at the Houston ARTCC and added radars to supplement the existing Federal Aviation Administration coverage in the area. However, the squadron was inactivated little more than a year later.

=== Lineage ===
- Constituted 1947 as 634th Aircraft Control Squadron

Activated on 21 May 1947
Redesignated 634th Aircraft Control and Warning Squadron on 8 December 1949
Inactivated on 6 February 1952

- Activated on 20 June 1953

Redesignated as 634th Radar Squadron (SAGE), 1 March 1961
Inactivated on 30 September 1970

- Redesignated as 634th Radar Squadron

Activated on 1 January 1973
Inactivated on 1 July 1974

Assignments

- 505th Aircraft Control and Warning Group, 21 May 1947 - 6 February 1952
- 25th Air Division, 20 June 1953
- 9th Air Division, 1 October 1954
- 25th Air Division, 15 August 1958
- 4700th Air Defense Wing, 1 September 1958
- 25th Air Division, 15 May 1960
- San Francisco Air Defense Sector, 1 July 1960
- Reno Air Defense Sector, 15 September 1960
- 26th Air Division, 1 April 1966
- 25th Air Division, 15 September 1969 – 30 September 1970
- 20th Air Division, 1 January 1973 – 1 July 1974

Stations

- McChord AFB, Washington, 21 May 1947 - 4 September 1948
- Everett (Later Paine Field), Washington, 4 September 1948 - 14 September 1951
- McChord AFB, Washington, 14 September 1951 - 6 February 1952
- McChord AFB, Washington, 20 June 1953
- Geiger Field, Washington, 1 October 1954
- Burns AFS, Oregon, 8 June 1955 – 30 September 1970
- Lake Charles AFS, Louisiana, 1 January 1973 – 1 July 1974
