= Burns Air Force Station =

Closed United States Air Force General Surveillance Radar station

Burns Air Force Station
- Part of Air Defense Command (ADC)
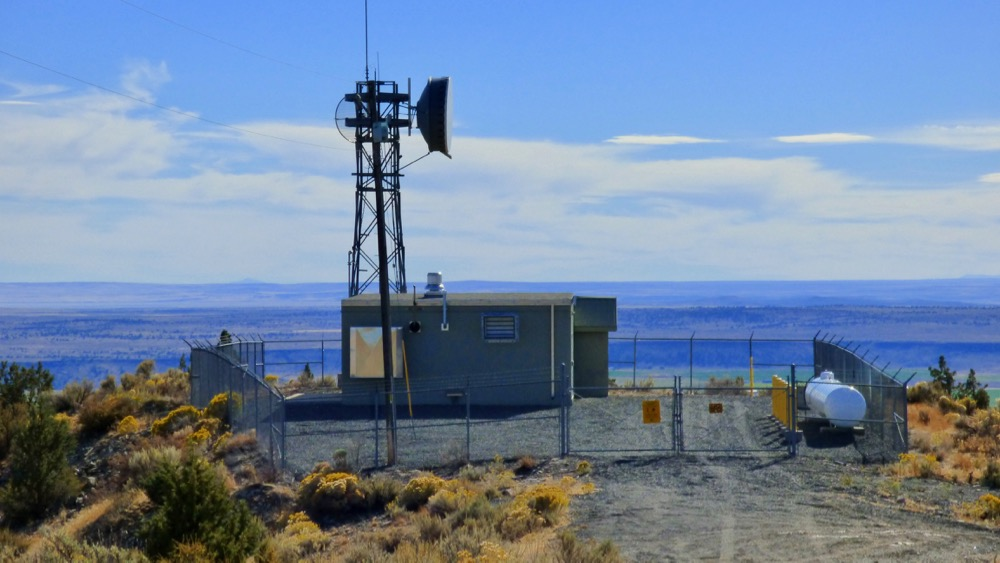
- Former radio site building

Site information
- Type: Air Force Station
- Code: ADC ID: M-118, NORAD ID: Z-118
- Controlled by: United States Air Force

Location
- Location of Burns AFS, Oregon
- Coordinates: 43°33′45″N 119°09′05″W

Site history
- Built: 1955
- In use: 1955-1974

Garrison information
- Garrison: 634th Aircraft Control and Warning Squadron

Burns Air Force Station is a closed United States Air Force General Surveillance Radar station. It is located 5.2 miles (8.4 km) west-southwest of Burns, Oregon. It was closed in 1974.

Burns Air Force Station was established as part of the planned deployment by Air Defense Command of forty-four Mobile radar stations across the United States to support the permanent Radar network established during the Cold War for air defense of the United States. This deployment had been projected to be operational by mid-1952. Funding, constant site changes, construction, and equipment delivery delayed deployment.

== History ==
The Station was activated on 8 June 1955 after the 634th Aircraft Control and Warning Squadron was moved to Burns by the 9th Air Division. The squadron began operating an AN/MPS-7 search-radar set at this site atop Burns Butte, and initially the station functioned as a Ground-Control Intercept (GCI) and warning station. As a GCI station, the squadron's role was to guide interceptor aircraft toward unidentified intruders picked up on the unit's radar scopes. By 1959 this radar had been joined by a pair of AN/FPS-6 height-finder radars. An AN/FPS-7B radar replaced the AN/MPS-7 radar in 1960.

During 1961 Burns AFS joined the Semi Automatic Ground Environment (SAGE) system, feeding data to DC-16 at Stead AFB, Nevada. After joining, the squadron was re-designated as the 634th Radar Squadron (SAGE) on 1 March 1961. The radar squadron provided information 24/7 the SAGE Direction Center where it was analyzed to determine range, direction altitude speed and whether or not aircraft were friendly or hostile. On 31 July 1963, the site was redesignated as NORAD ID Z-118.

Also in 1963, two AN/FPS-90s were performing height-finder duties. In 1965 an AN/FPS-66A search radar (relocated from Condon AFS, OR) replaced the AN/FPS-7B at the site. One AN/FPS-90 height-finder radar was retired in 1968.

In addition to the main facility, Burns operated an AN/FPS-14 Gap Filler site:

- Burns Junction, OR (M-118A) 42°43′00″N 117°52′14″W

The 634th Radar Squadron (SAGE) was inactivated at Burns AFS on 30 September 1970 as a result of budget restrictions, and the general phase down of air defense radar stations. The squadron was later re-activated in 1972 at Lake Charles AFS, Louisiana.

Circa 1974, the Burns Union High School District acquired the Burns Air Force Station properties, but later returned them to the federal government. The district had planned to have career development services for region students and housing for students. Controversy ensued when the federal government found that the returned property had deteriorated.

Today, what was Burns Air Force Station is abandoned. The site buildings stand deteriorated and heavily vandalized. It appears as a ghost town on top of the butte.

As of about 2005 the building have been removed and the US Government came in and removed hazardous materials from the site. Only the foundations remain and one concrete block building. The last visit was in 2013.

== See also ==
- List of USAF Aerospace Defense Command General Surveillance Radar Stations
