= Willow Run Air Force Station =

Former United States Air Force station

Coordinates: 42°14′31″N 83°29′57″W

Willow Run Air Force Station is a former United States Air Force station that operated to the east of Willow Run Airport in Michigan.

== History ==
In 1951, the United States Air Force exercised a right of return to Willow Run and established Willow Run Air Force Station to the east of the airport runway. On 7 April 1952 the site became operational with the establishment of Headquarters, 30th Air Division at the site, which was designated P-23 by ADC. In addition to the headquarters facility, Air Defense Command established a Manual Air-Defense Control Center (ADCC) at Willow Run AFS, for the tracking and control of aircraft as part of ADC's mission in the United States. Willow Run AFS operated until April 1959, when the 30th AD was reassigned to Truax Field, Wisconsin. The facility was then sold to the University of Michigan. Many of the former Air Force buildings still exist on the site and are used by various organizations.
