= AN/FPS-18 Radar =

The AN/FPS-18 was a medium-range search radar used by the United States Air Force Air Defense Command.

This medium-range search radar was designed and built by Bendix as a SAGE system gap-filler radar to provide low-altitude coverage. Operating in the S-band at a frequency between 2700 and 2900 MHz, the AN/FPS-18 could detect at a range of 65 miles.

The system was deployed in the late 1950s and 1960s at unstaffed radar facilities (called "Gap Fillers") designed to fill the low-altitude gaps between staffed long-range radar stations. Gaps in coverage existed due to the curvature of the Earth, mountains, hills, valleys, rivers, and so forth.

The typical gap-filler radar annex consisted of a small L-shaped cinder-block building, with the radar equipment and the data-transmission equipment in one section and one or more diesel generators in the other section. These gap-filler sites generally had a three-legged radar tower about 85 feet tall where the AN/FPS-18 Radar was mounted inside a radome.

In accordance with the Joint Electronics Type Designation System (JETDS), the "AN/FPS-18" designation represents the 18th design of an Army-Navy electronic device for fixed ground search radar. The JETDS system also now is used to name all Department of Defense and some NATO electronic systems.

== See also ==
- List of radars
- List of military electronics of the United States
