= AN/FPS-20 Early Warning Radar =

Family of L band early warning and ground-controlled interception radar systems

AN/FPS-3, AN/FPS-20
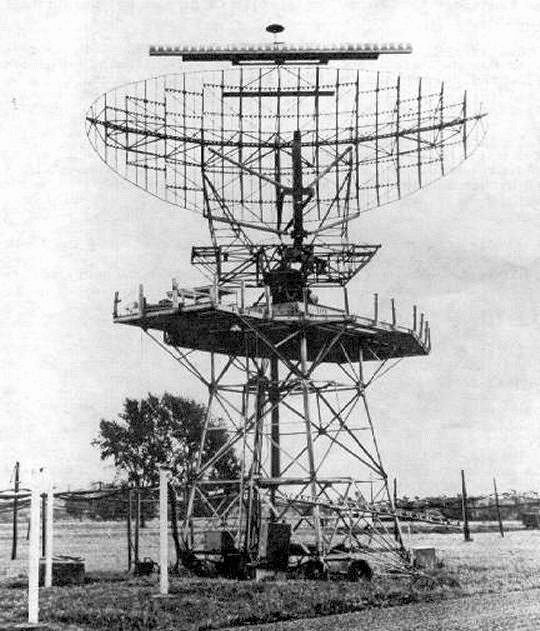
- Bendix AN/FPS-20 radar
- Country of origin: United States
- Type: General Surveillance Radar
- Frequency: L band
- PRF: 440
- Pulsewidth: 4 μS
- RPM: 3.3, 5, 10 RPM
- Power: 750 kW × 2
- Other names: AN/FPS-3, AN/MPS-7, AN/FPS-64, AN/FPS-65, AN/FPS-66, AN/FPS-67, AN/FPS-91, AN/FPS-93, AN/FPS-100, AN/FPS-113, AN/GPS-4, AN/FPS-508

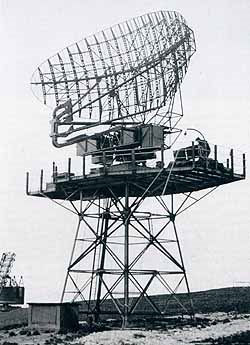
The FPS-3.

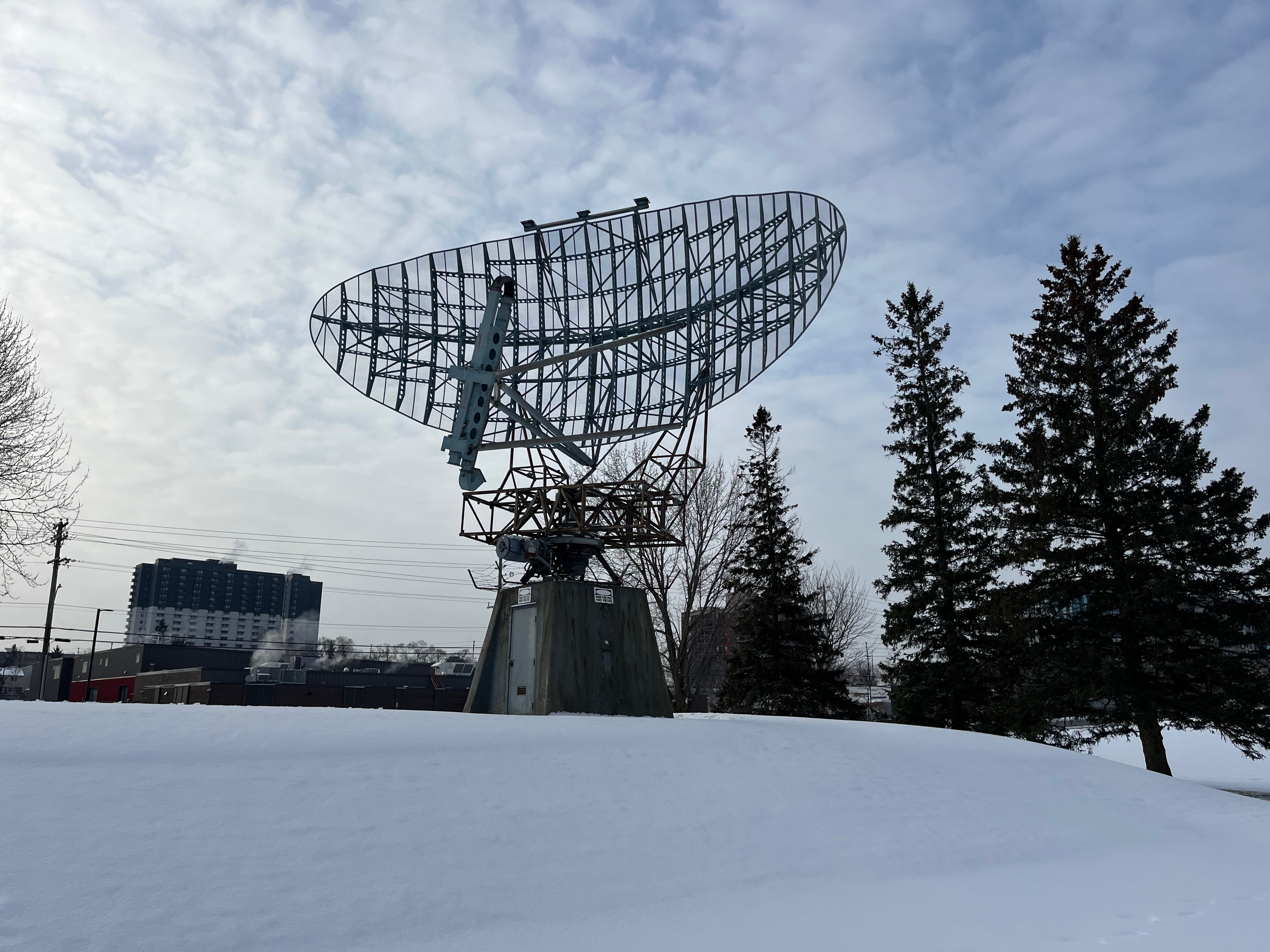
The antenna from a former Canadian Pinetree Line AN/FPS-20, now at the Canada Science and Technology Museum in Ottawa. The strip antenna that provides height finding is on the left, replacing the individual feed horns of the FPS-3.

The AN/FPS-20 was a widely used L band early warning and ground-controlled interception radar system employed by the United States Air Force Air Defense Command, the USAF CONAD in the continental United States, the NORAD Pinetree Line in Canada, where they were known as AN/FPS-508, and a variety of other users. The design started life as the Bendix AN/FPS-3 in 1950, was upgraded to the FPS-20, then spawned over a dozen different variants as additional upgrades were applied. The FPS-20 formed the backbone of the US air defense network through the early Cold War with over 200 units deployed. Most FPS-20 sites were replaced by modern equipment in the late 1960s, although a number were turned over to the FAA, modified for air traffic control use, and became ARSR-60s.

The first AN/FPS-3 arrived in December 1950, slated for installation at Eniwetok Atoll to control aircraft involved in the atomic bomb tests of early 1951. Over the next few years, 48 FPS-3s were installed to replace older systems in the Lashup Radar Network. The FPS-3 and was also produced as the AN/MPS-7, a mobile version. (Note: According to Winkler, the FPS-3 design was developed from the earlier CPS-5 design by Bell Labs and General Electric. radomes.org disputes the link with the CPS-5, which had a somewhat different antenna as can be seen in the photographs in Winkler's work. This confusion may be due to the language in Bacque, which refers to "newly developed AN/FPS-3 long-range radar set".) The system used two 5J26 magnetrons at 750 kW peak power, operating at 1300 MHz a 400 Hz pulse repetition frequency (prf) and 2 microsecond pulse width. The antenna was driven at three fixed speeds of 3.3, 5 or 10 RPM, normally operating at 5. Many of the operating modules were mounted on the rotating platform, with the output signals fed via slip rings to amplifiers and displays at the base of the unit.

The FPS-3 was limited to about 55,000 feet (17 km) altitude, which was seen as a limitation in light of new jet-powered bombers known to be in development in the USSR. This led to the development of the AN/GPA-27 add-on unit, increasing the altitude to 65,000 feet (20 km). (Note: The GPA-27 may be the slotted waveguide mounted on the top of the main antenna seen in images of the FPS-20. However, some images show this on radars labeled FPS-3, although this may be before they were renamed.) Installations began in 1956. (Note: Winkler refers to upgraded units as FPS-3B on page 76, but other sources agree with his own page 33 that these were actually called FPS-3A.) New-build units from Bendix with this equipment pre-installed became the AN/FPS-20 in 1957. (Note: Winkler does not mention this directly, but notes on page 77 that -3A units were also renamed FPS-20 when receiving updates.) Otherwise similar units with an antenna from General Electric were known as the AN/FPS-20B. The slotted-waveguide antenna pictured above the AN/FPS-20 is for the associated IFF system. (Note: A high-resolution Slotted-waveguide IFF antenna for the AN/FPS-3 radar by J.Y. Wong 1957 NRC Canada.)

The FPS-20s were simple pulse-radar systems and subject to jamming using basic techniques. This led to a second series of upgrades to provide anti-jamming capabilities starting in 1959. Among these were the GPA-102 (MK-448) which turned an FPS-20 into an FPS-64 and a FPS-20A to an FPS-66, and the GPA-103 (MK-447) which turned a FPS-20 into an FPS-65 and the FPS-20A into an FPS-67. Similar upgrades using a Canadian OA-4831 system produced the AN/FPS-87 and AN/FPS-87A. The BADGE 412-L upgrade of the FPS-20A created the AN/FPS-82.

A more major update was the MK-747, which added a new antenna from Raytheon, the Diplex Gating Unit (DGU), a bandpass filter and other modifications, to produce the AN/FPS-91 and 91A. The similar MK-748 applied to the -60 series resulted in the AN/FPS-64A, AN/FPS-65A, AN/FPS-66A and AN/FPS-67A. Canadian AN/FPS-87s were also converted, becoming AN/FPS-93 and 93A. These units were used with the SAGE system.

The FPS-20 was widely used in Japan. They produced their own series of modifications, including a tunnel diode based amplifier and a separate receiver for the Airborne Instruments Laboratories system, producing the AN/FPS-20/20A JAPAN, or -J.

The Indian Air Force used the FPS-20 with a new digital moving target indicator (MTI) system from Bendix to create the AN/FPS-100 and 100A. These systems were known as the "Blue Pearl", or Bendix Radar Processor BRP-150. These were remanufactured units with a new antenna, and included a new low-noise front-end amplifier. General Dynamics later produced a similar digital MTI system, the AN/FPS-113.

In accordance with the Joint Electronics Type Designation System (JETDS), the "AN/FPS-20" designation represents the 20th design of an Army-Navy electronic device for fixed ground search radar. The JETDS system also now is used to name all Department of Defense electronic systems.

== See also ==
- List of radars
- List of military electronics of the United States
