= Charleston Air Force Station =

Defunct Air Force Station in Maine, U.S.

Charleston Air Force Station
- Part of Aerospace Defense Command
- Charleston, Maine

Site information
- Type: Long Range Radar Site
- Code: ADC ID: P-65 NORAD ID: Z-65
- Controlled by: United States Air Force

Location
- Location of Charleston AFS, Maine
- Coordinates: 45°05′30″N 069°05′42″W

Site history
- Built: 1950–1951
- Built by: U.S. Air Force
- In use: 1952–1980

Garrison information
- Garrison: Charleston, Maine
- Occupants: 765th Air Defense Group; 765th Aircraft Control and Warning (later Radar) Squadron

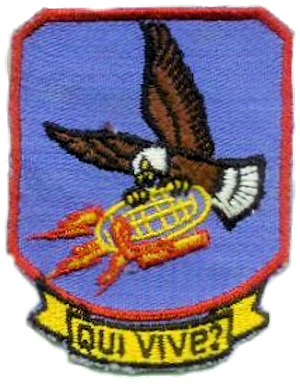
Emblem of the 765th Radar Squadron

Charleston Air Force Station is a defunct Air Force Station that opened in 1952 and closed in 1980. It was located in Charleston, Maine, and is the site of a radar station and other buildings. After closure, it was redeveloped into a juvenile jail for the state of Maine.

== History ==
In late 1950, construction began on Charleston Air Force Station. Known as Bull Hill for its location in the town, the station was one of twenty-eight stations built as part of the second segment of the permanent Air Defense Command national radar network. Prompted by the start of the Korean War, on 11 July 1950, the Secretary of the Air Force asked the Secretary of Defense for approval to expedite construction of the second segment of the permanent network. Receiving the Defense Secretary's approval on 21 July, the Air Force directed the Corps of Engineers to proceed with construction.

Completed in early 1951, and fully manned and operational when the 765th Aircraft Control and Warning Squadron brought Charleston AFS to life in April 1952 and assumed coverage that had been provided by a temporary Lashup Radar Network site at Dow AFB (L-l). The site initially had AN/FPS-3 and AN/FPS-5 radars, and initially the station functioned as an aircraft control and warning station.

In 1957 an AN/FPS-6 replaced the AN/FPS-5 height-finder radar. Another height-finder radar came in 1958 along with an AN/FPS-20 search radar that replaced the AN/FPS-3. During 1959 Charleston AFS joined the Semi Automatic Ground Environment (SAGE) system, feeding data to DC-05 at Topsham AFS, Maine. After joining, the squadron was redesignated as the 765th Radar Squadron (SAGE) on 1 October 1959. The radar squadron provided information 24/7 the SAGE Direction Center where it was analyzed to determine range, direction, altitude, speed, and whether or not aircraft were friendly or hostile.

765TH RADAR SQUADRON

AWARDED AIR FORCE OUTSTANDING UNIT AWARD

Topsham, Maine—The 765th Radar Squadron at Charleston Air Force Station, Maine, commanded by Maj George Marvin, has been awarded the Air Force Outstanding Unit Award, according to orders issued by the Department of the Air Force headquarters in Washington D.C.

The award is for the period 1 Jan 1959, and 30 April 1963, during which time the unit demonstrated "exceptionally meritorious service in support of military operations". Basic mission of the unit, situated atop Bull Hill in Central Maine, is to provide search and height data on aircraft to the Bangor North American and Bangor Air Defense Sectors headquarters Semi-Automatic Ground Environment (SAGE) Direction Center at Topsham Air Force Station.

The 765th also provides ground-to-air and data-link communication facilities to manned and unmanned interceptor weapons systems and provides manual direction to manned interceptors under situations where the basic SAGE system is not in control.

Involved in this manual control are F-101 and F89J jet interceptor aircraft from the 75th Fighter Interceptor Squadron and 132nd Maine Air National Guard Squadron respectively, both at Dow AFB, and F-106 jets from the 27th Fighter Interceptor Squadron at Loring AFB, all units of the Bangor Air Defense Sector.

Basis equipment of the unit includes search radar, the only one of its particular type in the Bangor Sector; an unmanned search radar at Topsfield, Maine, 90 miles northeast of the squadron site; a height finding radar complex; a digital data transmitted and data-link transmitter.

Factors involved which led to the award were primarily the quality and quantity of radar inputs and air-to-ground communication capability provided the SAGE Direction Center at Topsham AFS.

One major problem overcome by the squadron commander to accomplish this outstanding mission was in the field of personnel. In 1961 there were only 85 airmen assigned to the 765th and in the summer of 1962 only four officers with 80 airmen on On-The-Job Training status. Presently there are 14 officers and 210 airmen assigned to the unit.

The supply account record review for the unit was judged the "Best In 26th Air Division" in September, 1961, by Air Defense Command headquarters personnel who accomplished their review in three hours rather than two days which was standard time at other installations; the 26th Civil Engineering section in July, 1962, indicated that the station was the "Best Maintained" in the division; the unit dispensary was rated "Best In Division"; and the Communication-Electronics section, through continuous outstanding performance of mission requirements, is considered one of the "Best In Air Defense Command."

Consecutive reports by the USAF Inspector General's office from 1960 through 1962 relate better than normal degree of efficiency by the unit; the squadron was the first to win the 26th Air Division Commander's Recreation Trophy for morale and team spirit in September, 1962; and the unit is well respected by the surrounding civilian community populace because of an active public relations program by all personnel.

[Submitted by George Marvin]" ' In 1963 the site became the first in the nation to receive an AN/FPS-27 radar and on 31 July 1963, the site was redesignated as NORAD ID Z-65. This radar subsequently was upgraded to become an AN/FPS-27A. The AN/FPS-26A was then converted into an AN/FSS-7 submarine-launched ballistic missile radar in 1966 for Detachment 6, 14th Missile Warning Squadron (MWS) to monitor for Ballistic Missile launches by submarines.

In addition to the main facility, Charleston operated two unmanned Gap Filler sites:

- Topsfield, Maine (P-65A/Z-65A) 45°23′18″N 067°47′50″W
- Sedgwick, Maine (Z-6BB) 44°18′51″N 068°38′22″W

Topsfield was equipped with an AN/FPS-18; Control of Sedgwick was transferred to Charleston AFS after Brunswick AFS (Z-13) closed in 1965 and was equipped with the AN/FPS-14.

Over the years, the equipment at the station was upgraded or modified to improve the efficiency and accuracy of the information gathered by the radars. The 765th Radar Sq was inactivated and replaced by the 765th Air Defense Group in March 1970. The upgrade to group status was done as Charleston AFS' was designated as a [Backup Interceptor Control] (BUIC) site. BUIC sites were alternate control sites in case SAGE Direction Centers became disabled and unable to control interceptor aircraft. The group was inactivated and replaced by the 765th Radar Squadron. As defenses against manned bombers were reduced, the group was disbanded in 1984. The 765th Radar Squadron was inactivated on 29 June 1979 as part of a general draw down of air defense forces by Aerospace Defense Command and the transfer of the mission to Tactical Air Command. The 14th MWS detachment was inactivated a year later.

After the base closed, the radar site was abandoned, with several radar towers still standing. The station area was transformed into the Charleston Correctional Facility, which opened in 1980. The family-housing area has been entirely demolished.

== Air Force units and assignments ==
=== Units ===
- Constituted as the 765th Aircraft Control and Warning Squadron on 14 November 1950

Activated at Dow Air Force Base (L-1), ME on 27 November 1950
Moved to Charleston Air Force Starion in August 1951
Redesignated 765th Radar Squadron (SAGE) on 1 October 1959
Inactivated on 1 March 1970
Redesignated 765th Radar Squadron on 1 January 1974
Activated on 17 January 1974
Inactivated 29 June 1979

- Constituted as the 765th Air Defense Group on 13 February 1970

Activated on 1 March 1970
Inactivated on 17 January 1974
Disbanded on 27 September 1984

- Organized as Detachment 6, 14th Missile Warning Squadron in 1966

Discontinued in 1980

==== Awards ====

- Air Force Outstanding Unit Award, 765th Radar Squadron, 2 awards

G-153, 1963, 1 January 1959 – 30 April 1963; GB-56, 1976, 1 July 1974 – 30 June 1975

- Air Force Outstanding Unit Award, 14th Missile Warning Squadron, 3 awards

GB-162, 1977, 1 July 1974 – 1 April 1976; GB-062, 1979, 2 April 1976 – 1 April 1978; GB-781, 1979, 2 April 1978 – 30 June 1979

==== Charleston Air Force Station Commanders ====
765th Air Defense Group

- Lt Col D. S. Parmlee, 1 March 1970 – unknown

765th Radar Squadron

- Lt Col William S. Meyer, Commander, 765th RADS, 1976–1979

Det 6 14th Missile Warning Squadron

- Maj Jamie Hill, Commander, Det 6, 14th Missile Warning Squadron, 1977–1980

=== Assignments ===
765th AC&W Squadron / Radar Squadron

- 540th Aircraft Control and Warning Group, 1 January 1951
- 32d Air Division, 6 February 1952
- 4711th Air Defense Wing, 16 February 1953
- 32d Air Division, 1 March 1956
- Bangor Air Defense Sector, 15 August 1958
- 36th Air Division, 1 April 1966
- 35th Air Division, 15 September 1969
- 21st Air Division, 19 November 1969 – 1 March 1970
- 21st Air Division, 17 January 1974 – 29 June 1979

765th Air Defense Group

- 21st Air Division, 1 March 1970 – 17 January 1974

== See also ==
- List of United States Air Force aircraft control and warning squadrons
- United States general surveillance radar stations
