= Saratoga Springs Air Force Station =

Former US Air Force radar station

Saratoga Springs Air Force Station
- Part of Air Defense Command (ADC)

Site information
- Type: Air Force Station
- Controlled by: United States Air Force

Location
- Location of Saratoga Springs AFS, New York
- Coordinates: 43°00′41″N 073°40′57″W

Site history
- Built: 1952
- In use: 1952–1977

Garrison information
- Garrison: 656th Aircraft Control and Warning (later Radar) Squadron

Saratoga Springs (Also known as Schuylerville) Air Force Station (ADC ID: P-50, NORAD ID: Z-50) is a closed United States Air Force General Surveillance Radar station. It is located 7.2 miles (11.6 km) southeast of Saratoga Springs, New York. It was closed by the Air Force in 1977.

== History ==
In September 1948 the Air Force authorized Air Defense Command to establish thirteen radar stations in the Northeastern United States. These stations were in operation by mid-1949. Prompted by the start of the Korean War, on 11 July 1950, the Secretary of the Air Force asked the Secretary of Defense for approval to expedite construction of additional stations, and it received the Defense Secretary's approval on 21 July, the Air Force directed the Army Corps of Engineers to proceed with construction.

Because of difficulties with new production radar equipment, the radar station, initially known as Schuylerville, NY, did not open until 1 February 1952 when the 656th Aircraft Control and Warning Squadron activated with AN/FPS-3 and AN/FPS-5 radars and assumed the coverage from the temporary "Lashup" site at Schenectady, NY (L-7), and initially the station functioned as a Ground-Control Intercept (GCI) and warning station. As a GCI station, the squadron's role was to guide interceptor aircraft toward unidentified intruders picked up on the unit's radar scopes. The station was redesignated as Saratoga Springs AFS on 1 December 1953.

Saratoga Springs AFS was one of the first to receive an AN/FPS-20 search radar in the spring of 1957. By 1958 the original radars were gone, and operations continued with an AN/FPS-20 and a pair of AN/FPS-6 height-finder radars. During 1958 Saratoga Springs AFS joined the Semi Automatic Ground Environment (SAGE) system, initially feeding data to DC-02 at Stewart AFB, New York. After joining, the squadron was re-designated as the 656th Radar Squadron (SAGE) on 15 December 1958. The radar squadron provided information 24/7 the SAGE Direction Center where it was analyzed to determine range, direction altitude speed and whether or not aircraft were friendly or hostile.

The search radar subsequently was upgraded in 1961 to become an AN/FPS-65. Major equipment changes occurred during 1963 with the arrival of an AN/FPS-27 search radar along with AN/FPS-26A and AN/FPS-90 height-finder radars. On 31 July 1963, the site was redesignated as NORAD ID Z-50. In 1964 this site became an ADC/FAA joint-use facility. The AN/FPS-65 was removed in 1965.

In addition to the main facility, Saratoga Springs operated three unmanned AN/FPS-14 Gap Filler sites:

- New Preston, CT (P-50A) 41°43′37″N 073°21′11″W
- Andes, NY (P-50B) 42°13′13″N 074°51′05″W
- New Salem, MA (P-50E) 42°30′37″N 072°21′13″W

All were closed in June 1968.

Over the years, the equipment at the station was upgraded or modified to improve the efficiency and accuracy of the information gathered by the radars. The site conducted routine operations until 1976 when it was announced the station would be closed as a result of the unlikelihood of an air attack on the Continental United States. The 656th Radar Squadron was inactivated on 30 June 1977. The FAA continued using the AN/FPS-27 tower to house beacon (SIF) only for several years after the USAF ceased radar operations.

Today, Saratoga Springs Air Force Station is abandoned and deteriorating. Most structures and towers still stand in various states of disrepair. The three Gap Filler sites have their support buildings still standing, also abandoned.

== Air Force units and assignments ==
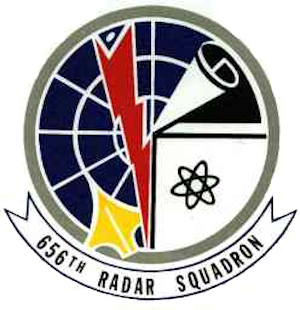
Emblem of the 656th Radar Squadron

Units:

- 656th Aircraft Control and Warning Squadron, Activated 27 November 1950 at Schenectady, NY (L-7)

Moved to permanent site at Schuylerville, NY 1 February 1952 (redesignated Saratoga Springs Air Force Station) 1 December 1953
Redesignated: 656th Radar Squadron (SAGE), 15 December 1958
Redesignated: 656th Radar Squadron, 1 February 1974
Inactivated 30 June 1977

Assignments:

- 540th Aircraft Control and Warning Group (32d Air Division), 27 November 1950
- 32d Air Division, 6 February 1952
- 4707th Defense Wing, 16 February 1953
- 4622d Air Defense Wing, 16 October 1956
- Boston Air Defense Sector, 8 January 1957
- 35th Air Division, 1 April 1966
- 21st Air Division, 19 November 1969 – 30 June 1977

== See also ==
- United States general surveillance radar stations
