= Watertown Air Force Station =

Closed United States Air Force ADCOM General Surveillance Radar station

- Part of 1951-1968: Air Defense Command; 1968-1979: Aerospace Defense Command; 1979-1984: Air Defense, Tactical Air Command
- Watertown, New York
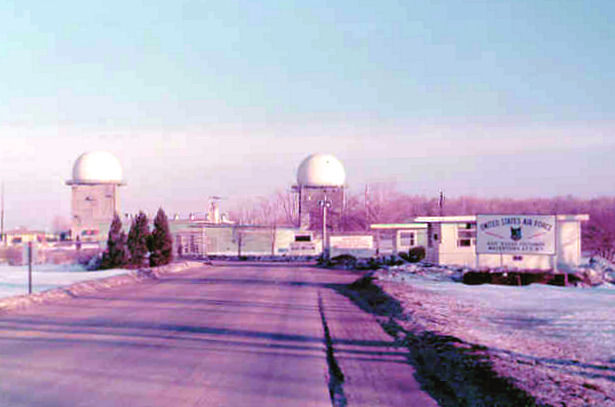
- 2 radomes and the main gate with guard shack (1975)

Site information
- Type: Long Range Radar Site
- Code: RP-49: 1950 ADC permanent network Z-49: 1963 July 31 NORAD network
- Controlled by: United States Air Force

Location
- Location in New York
- Coordinates: 43°55′31″N 075°54′33″W

Site history
- Built: 1952
- Built by: U.S. Air Force
- In use: 1952-1979

Garrison information
- Garrison: Watertown, New York
- Occupants: 655th Radar Squadron

Watertown Air Force Station is a closed United States Air Force ADCOM General Surveillance Radar station 3.5 miles (5.6 km) south of Watertown, New York. Prior to the Air Defense squadron inactivating on 1 November 1979, the station was reassigned to Tactical Air Command which maintained the Ground Air Transmitter Receiver until early 1984 (now a firefighter training site). A New York State jail opened at the site c. 1983.

== History ==
Lashup Radar Network site L-6 was established in June 1950 at the Pine Camp military installation (renamed Fort Drum in 1951) and operated by the 655th Aircraft Control and Warning Squadron using an RCA AN/TPS-10A Radar. After construction adjacent to Fort Drum in June 1952, the operation moved to the Air Force Station, one of the first twenty-four Air Defense Command radar stations of the permanent network established 1950-1951 after the USAF directed construction of the sites on December 2, 1948. Watertown AFS used AN/FPS-3 and AN/FPS-5 radars for warning and ground-controlled interception. In 1958 this site was operating with AN/FPS-20 search radar and General Electric AN/FPS-6 Radar for height-finding.

During 1959 Watertown AFS began providing Semi Automatic Ground Environment (SAGE) data to DC-03 at Syracuse AFS, New York, and the squadron was re-designated as the 655th Radar Squadron (SAGE) on 1 February 1959. In 1959 a 2nd AN/FPS-6 was added and in 1961, the FPS-20 was upgraded to an AN/FPS-66. One height-finder radar was replaced by an Avco AN/FPS-26 Radar in 1963. In 1964 the AN/FPS-66 was replaced by a Westinghouse AN/FPS-27 Radar.

In addition to the main facility, the Watertown squadron operated two unmanned AN/FPS-14 (P-49A) and AN/FPS-18 (P-49B) Gap Filler sites:

- Suttons Corner, NY (P-49A) 43°21′17″N 076°17′09″W
- Oswegatchie, NY (P-49B) 44°10′01″N 075°07′08″W

== Air Force units and assignments ==
Units:

- 655th Aircraft Control and Warning Squadron, activated 8 December 1949 at Pine Camp, NY (L-6)

Moved to Watertown AFS, NY, 1 February 1951

Redesignated 655th Radar Squadron (SAGE), 1 February 1959
Redesignated 655th Radar Squadron, 1 February 1974

- Inactivated 1 November 1979

Assignments:

- 540th Aircraft Control and Warning Group (32d Air Division), 18 Dec 1949
- 32d Air Division, 6 February 1952
- 4711th Air Defense Wing, 16 February 1953
- 32d Air Division, 1 March 1956
- Syracuse Air Defense Sector, 1 September 1958
- Boston Air Defense Sector, 4 September 1963
- 35th Air Division, 1 April 1966
- 21st Air Division, 19 November 1969 - 31 December 1979
