= Boston Air Defense Sector =

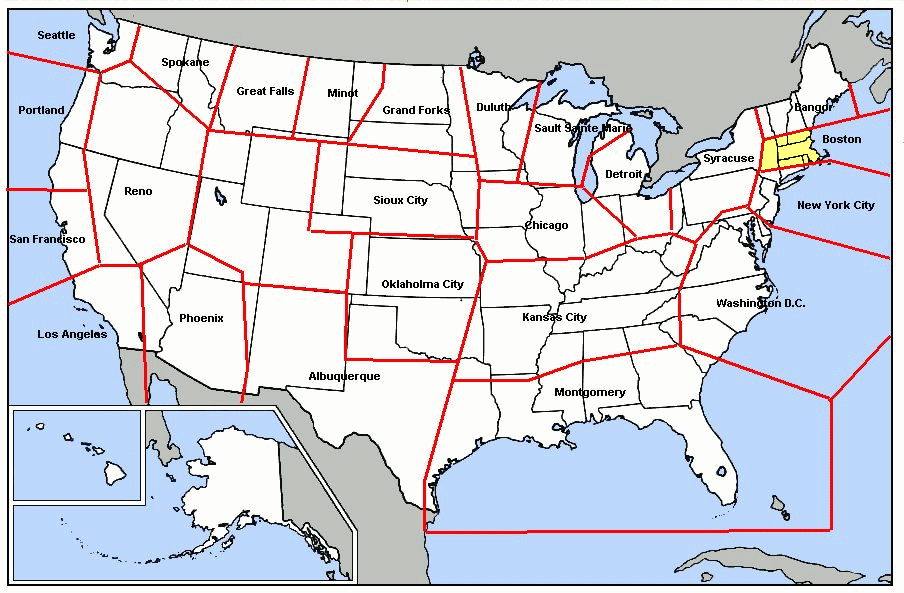
- 1958 Boston Air Defense Sector Area of Responsibility
- Active: 1956–1966
- Country: United States
- Branch: United States Air Force
- Role: Air defense
- Motto: Ready

Insignia
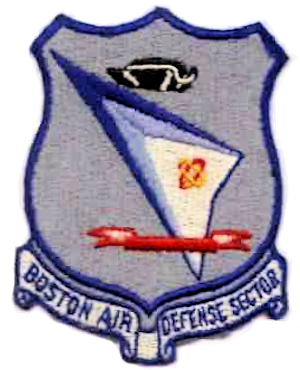
- Boston Air Defense Sector emblem (Note: Approved 24 April 1957. Description: On a shield Argent, a stylized delta shaped projectile, flying bendwise, per bend to dexter chief, variegated, Azure, sky blue, and white, marked with an atomic symbol of two orbits Gules and Or, entwined around a center nuclei Sable; in chief a tri-corned cocked hat proper (black, highlighted white); superimposed over all in base, a ribbon fesswise Gules with forked ends and lining Argent, piped Gules, the shield edged Azure. Significance: The stylized delta shape projectile is poised skyward which is symbolic of air power. The different shades of blue in the delta projectile depict the voids of space and our battleground. The atomic symbol represents the power and strength of our command. The red ribbon, an honorable heraldic marking debruising the lower area of the delta projectile, symbolizes the noble virtues inherent in the men of our sector -- hardiness, valor, loyalty to country, and devotion to duty, in readiness always to defend our country. The tri-cornered cocked hat is placed in the chief area of our shield and relates the modern airmen of the Air Defense Command to the original “Minutemen.” The silver field of our shield represents steel which depicts our ability and strength to meet the air defense requirements for the present and in the future.)

The Boston Air Defense Sector (BADS) is an inactive United States Air Force Air Defense Command (ADC) organization. Its last assignment was with the 26th Air Division at Hancock Field, New York.

== History ==
BADS was established in 1956 at Stewart Air Force Base (AFB), New York as the 4622nd Air Defense Wing pending completion of the new Semi Automatic Ground Environment (SAGE) Direction Center (DC-02) and Combat Center (CC-04) which became operational 15 September 1958. DC-02 was equipped with dual AN/FSQ-7 Computers. Early in 1957, the wing was redesignated as the Boston Air Defense Sector.

The mission of the BADS was to provide air defense over New England initially in an area covering southern Maine, southern New Hampshire, southern Vermont, Massachusetts, northern Rhode Island and Connecticut and part of New York. The day-to-day operations of the command were to train and maintain tactical units flying jet interceptor aircraft (North American F-86 Sabre, Northrop F-89 Scorpion, Lockheed F-94 Starfire, Convair F-102 Delta Dagger, Lockheed F-104 Starfighter) and operating radars and interceptor missiles (Boeing CIM-10 Bomarc) in a state of readiness with training missions and series of exercises with Strategic Air Command and other units simulating interceptions of incoming enemy aircraft. From 1960 to 1962, BADS was also responsible for a squadron in Nova Scotia that controlled interceptors "manually" (by voice instructions rather than by data link).

The Otis Bomarc SAMs (26th ADMS) were directed from the Air Defense Direction Center (CC-01/DC-03) at Hancock Air Force Base, Syracuse, New York. Continental Air Defense Command, in setting up the air defence command and control system in the area, had designated the Boston Air Defense Sector as 1 of 4 sectors in the 26th Air Division "effective April 1, 1958" DC-03 was operational on 1 December 1958; and the division was the 1st operational in the SAGE Air Defense Network — 1 January 1959 (CC-01 was the "first SAGE regional battle post", beginning operations "in early 1959".)

The radar network supporting BADS required near-total coverage, with radar beams overlapping and sites no more than 25 miles apart. Early gap-filling radars included two SCR-584 units at Scituate and Rockport, Massachusetts—these were World War II-era radars developed by the MIT Radiation Laboratory. Their initial performance was disappointing, requiring significant improvements before they could be used effectively. The SAGE system, which BADS relied on, was the direct impetus for the founding of MIT Lincoln Laboratory. The lab’s early work included not only radar netting but also the development of advanced radar data filtering and digital relay systems, which were first tested at Cape Cod and then implemented in the BADS region.

The Sector was moved on paper to Hancock Field, New York and was eliminated on 1 April 1966 due to a general reorganization of ADC. Most of its assigned units were reassigned to the 34th or 35th Air Divisions.

== Lineage ==
- Designated as the 4622d Air Defense Wing, SAGE on 1 April 1956 and organized

Redesignated as Boston Air Defense Sector on 8 January 1957
Discontinued and inactivated on 1 April 1966

=== Assignments ===
- Eastern Air Defense Force, 1 April 1956 – 18 October 1956
- 26th Air Division, 18 October 1956 – 1 October 1966

=== Stations ===
- Stewart AFB, New York, 1 April 1956 – 1 April 1966
- Hancock Field, New York, 1 April 1966 – 1 April 1966

=== Components ===
==== Wings ====
- 33d Fighter Wing (Air Defense)

Otis AFB, Massachusetts, 8 January - 18 August 1957

==== Groups ====
- 329th Fighter Group (Air Defense)

Stewart AFB, New York, 18 October 1956 – 1 August 1959

- 4729th Air Defense Group

Westover AFB, Massachusetts, 1 July 1957 – 30 April 1958

- 4735th Air Defense Group

Otis AFB, Massachusetts, 18 August 1957 – 1 September 1959

==== Interceptor squadrons ====
- 49th Fighter-Interceptor Squadron

Laurence G. Hanscom Field, Massachusetts, 1 August 1958 – 1 July 1959; 4 September 1963-1 April 1966

- 60th Fighter-Interceptor Squadron

Otis AFB, Massachusetts, 1 August 1959 – 1 April 1966

- 76th Fighter-Interceptor Squadron

Westover AFB, Massachusetts, 1 February 1961 – 1 July 1963

- 324th Fighter-Interceptor Squadron

Westover AFB, Massachusetts, 8 October 1956 – 8 July 1957

- 337th Fighter-Interceptor Squadron

Westover AFB, Massachusetts, 18 October 1956 – 8 July 1957, 25 June 1958-8 July 1960

- 465th Fighter-Interceptor Squadron

Laurence B. Hanscom Field, Massachusetts, 1 July 1959 – 15 March 1960

==== Missile squadron ====
- 26th Air Defense Missile Squadron (BOMARC)

Otis AFB, Massachusetts, 1 March 1959 – 1 April 1966

==== Radar squadrons ====
- 644th Aircraft Control and Warning Squadron

Rye Air Force Station (AFS), New Hampshire, 18 October 1956 – 30 October 1957

- 648th Aircraft Control & Warning Squadron (later 648th Radar Squadron (SAGE))

Benton AFS, Pennsylvania, 18 October 1956 – 15 August 1958; 4 September 1963 - 1 April 1966

- 654th Radar Squadron (SAGE)

Brunswick AFS, Maine, 1 August 1962 – 25 June 1965

- 655th Radar Squadron (SAGE)

Watertown AFS, New York, 4 September 1963 – 1 April 1966

- 656th Aircraft Control & Warning Squadron (later 656th Radar Squadron (SAGE))

Saratoga Springs AFS, New York, 18 October 1956 – 1 April 1966

- 672d Aircraft Control and Warning Squadron

Barrington AS, Nova Scotia, 1 July 1960 – 1 June 1962

- 762nd Aircraft Control & Warning Squadron (later 762d Radar Squadron (SAGE))

North Truro AFS, Massachusetts, 18 October 1956 – 1 April 1966

- 764th Radar Squadron (SAGE)

Saint Albans AFS, Vermont, 1 August 1962 – 1 April 1966

- 820th Radar Squadron (SAGE) (later 820th Aircraft Control & Warning Squadron)

Fort Heath, Massachusetts, 18 October 1959 – 1 December 1962

- 911th Radar Squadron (SAGE)

Lyndonville AFS, Vermont, 1 August 1962 – 1 August 1963

=== Weapons Systems ===
- F-86D, 1957-1957
- F-86L, 1957-1960
- F-89H, 1957-1960
- F-89J, 1957-1961
- F-94C, 1957-1959
- F-101B, 1959-1966
- F-102A, 1961-1963
- F-104A, 1958-1960
- IM-99 (later CIM-10), 1959-1966

== See also ==
- List of USAF Aerospace Defense Command General Surveillance Radar Stations
- Aerospace Defense Command Fighter Squadrons
- List of MAJCOM wings
- List of United States Air Force aircraft control and warning squadrons
