= Albuquerque Air Defense Sector =

Albuquerque Air Defense Sector

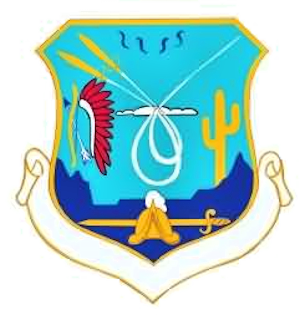
- Emblem of Albuquerque Air Defense Sector
- Active: 1 January – 1 November 1960
- Country: United States
- Branch: United States Air Force
- Role: Air Defense
- Part of: Air Defense Command
- Garrison/HQ: Kirtland Air Force Base

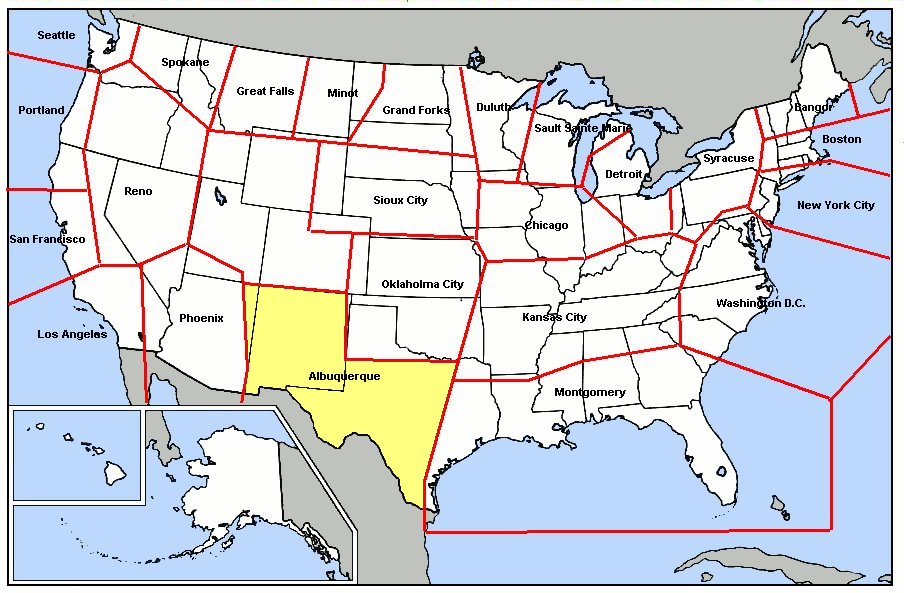
Map of Albuquerque ADS

The Albuquerque Air Defense Sector (AADS) is an inactive United States Air Force organization. It was briefly active between 1 January and 1 November 1960, assigned to the 33d Air Division at Kirtland Air Force Base, New Mexico. The sector was responsible for the air defense of New Mexico and most of Texas, and was inactivated as a result of a shift towards ballistic missile defense.

== History ==
The Albuquerque Air Defense Sector was activated on 1 January 1960 as a manual sector, lacking a SAGE Computer, at Kirtland Air Force Base (AFB), assigned to the simultaneously redesignated 33rd Air Division (SAGE); it replaced the 34th Air Division (Defense), inactivated on the same date. 34th Air Division commander Colonel Lewis W. Stocking took command of the sector, leading it until September.

The mission of the AADS was to provide air defense for New Mexico, most of Texas, southern Colorado, and the Oklahoma Panhandle. The organization provided command and control over three fighter-interceptor squadrons: the 58th at Walker AFB, the 93d at Kirtland, and the 331st at Webb AFB; as well as nine aircraft control and warning squadrons: the 683d, 685th, 686th, 687th, 688th, 697th, 732d, 768th, and 769th, which operated radar stations in New Mexico and Texas.

The sector operated Manual Air-Defense Control Center (ADCC) (P-41), inherited from the 34th Air Division. A SAGE Direction Center was planned but never built. On 1 November 1960 the Albuquerque ADS was inactivated without gaining operational status when ADC ended command and control operations at Kirtland, part of a reorganization of Air Defense Command against the new ballistic missile threat.

The organizations under AADS were inactivated or transferred to the Oklahoma City Air Defense Sector before its inactivation, on 15 September. The 58th and 331st Fighter-Interceptor Squadrons were transferred to the Oklahoma City Air Defense Sector, along with all of the Aircraft Control and Warning Squadrons. The 260 AADS headquarters personnel were also moved to Oklahoma City. The 93d Fighter-Interceptor Squadron had been inactivated on 8 July as its North American F-86 Sabre fighters were phased out.

=== Lineage ===
- Established as Albuquerque Air Defense Sector on 1 January 1960

Inactivated on 1 November 1960

=== Assignments ===
- 33d Air Division, 1 January 1960 – 1 November 1960

=== Stations ===
- Kirtland AFB, New Mexico, 1 January 1960 – 1 November 1960

=== Components ===
==== Interceptor squadrons ====
- 58th Fighter-Interceptor Squadron

Walker AFB, New Mexico, 1 January – 15 September 1960

- 93d Fighter-Interceptor Squadron

Kirtland AFB, New Mexico, 1 January – 8 July 1960

- 331st Fighter-Interceptor Squadron

Webb AFB, Texas, 1 January – 15 September 1960

==== Radar squadrons ====
- 683d Aircraft Control and Warning Squadron

Sweetwater AFS, Texas, 1 January – 15 September 1960

- 685th Aircraft Control and Warning Squadron

Las Cruces AFS, New Mexico, 1 January – 15 September 1960

- 686th Aircraft Control and Warning Squadron

Walker AFB, New Mexico, 1 January – 15 September 1960

- 687th Aircraft Control and Warning Squadron

West Mesa AFS, New Mexico, 1 January – 15 September 1960

- 688th Aircraft Control and Warning Squadron

Amarillo AFB, Texas, 1 January – 15 September 1960

- 697th Aircraft Control and Warning Squadron

Pyote AFS, Texas, 1 January – 15 September 1960

- 732d Aircraft Control and Warning Squadron

Ozona AFS, Texas, 1 January – 15 September 1960

- 768th Aircraft Control and Warning Squadron

Moriarty AFS, New Mexico, 1 January – 15 September 1960

- 769th Aircraft Control and Warning Squadron

Continental Divide AFS, New Mexico, 1 January – 15 September 1960

== See also ==
- List of USAF Aerospace Defense Command General Surveillance Radar Stations
- Aerospace Defense Command Fighter Squadrons
