= Brookfield Air Force Station =

Closed radar station in Ohio

Brookfield Air Force Station
- Part of Air Defense Command (ADC)

Site information
- Type: Air Force Station
- Code: ADC ID: P-62
- Controlled by: United States Air Force

Location
- Location of Brookfield AFS, Ohio
- Coordinates: 41°13′09″N 080°33′43″W

Site history
- Built: 1923
- In use: 1952-1959

Garrison information
- Garrison: 662d Aircraft Control and Warning Squadron

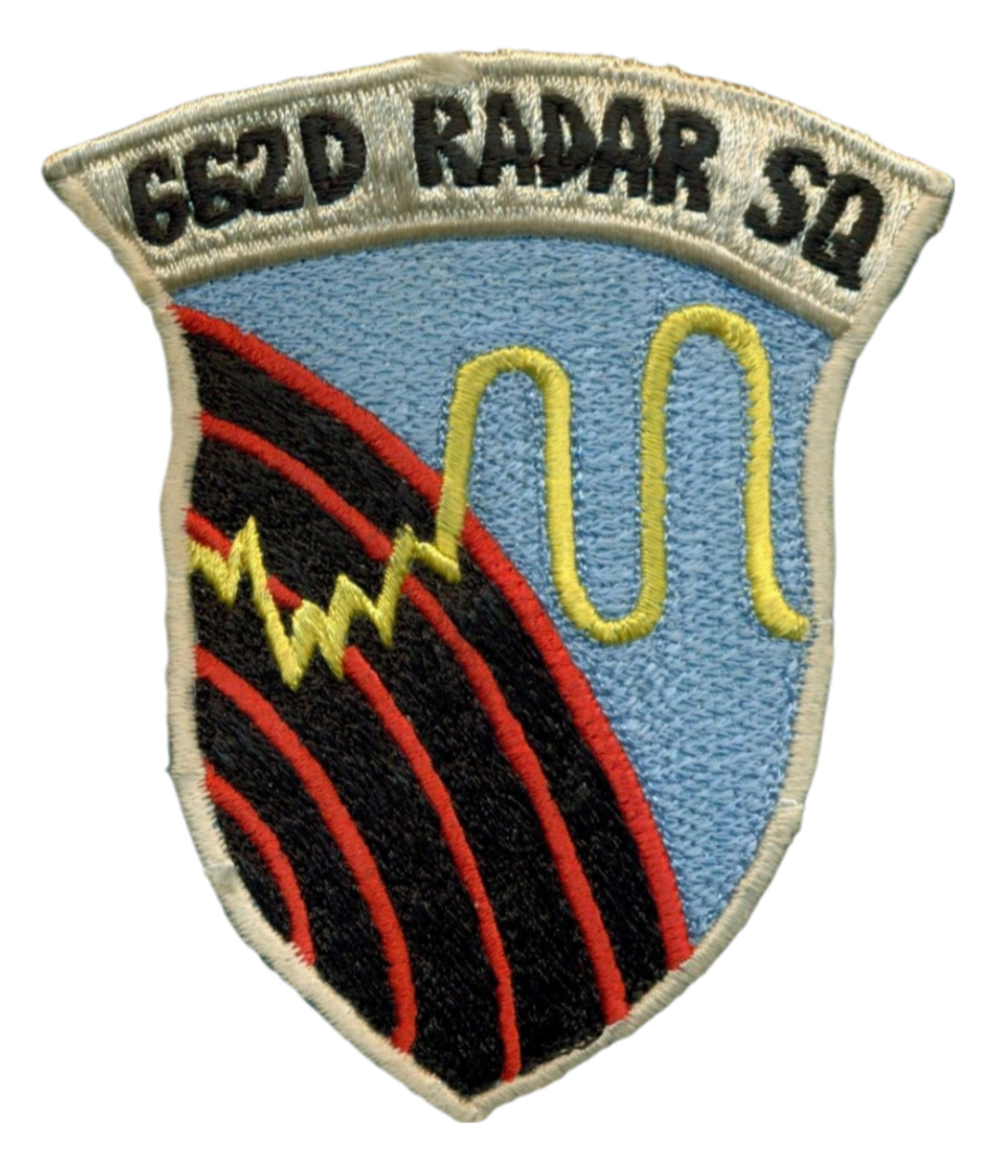
Emblem of the 662d Aircraft Control and Warning Squadron

Brookfield Air Force Station is a closed United States Air Force General Surveillance Radar station. It is located 1.1 miles (1.8 km) south-southeast of Brookfield, Ohio. It was closed in 1959.

== History ==
Brookfield Air Force Station constructed as part of the Air Defense Command permanent network it was opened in April 1952.

The 662d Aircraft Control and Warning Squadron began operations with AN/FPS-3 and AN/FPS-5 radars, and initially the station functioned as a Ground-Control Intercept (GCI) and warning station. As a GCI station, the squadron's role was to guide interceptor aircraft toward unidentified intruders picked up on the unit's radar scopes. This operation allowed Lashup site L-18 at Ravenna, Ohio, to shut down. In 1957 the AN/FPS-5 height-finder radar was replaced with an AN/FPS-4, and then the AN/FPS-4 was replaced with an AN/FPS-6 in 1958.

In addition to the main facility, Brookfield operated two unmanned AN/FPS-14 (P-62B) and AN/FPS-18 (P-62A) Gap Filler sites

- Thompson, Ohio (P-62A) 41°41′09″N 081°02′38″W
- Lewisville, Ohio (P-62B) 39°45′23″N 081°13′40″W

The P-62 site designation and the 662d Radar Squadron were transferred to Oakdale AFS, Pennsylvania, when radar operations ceased at Brookfield AFS on 1 Nov 1959 due to budget considerations. This site at Brookfield became a gap-filler radar site (RP-62E) for Oakdale. The Brookfield site operated as a gap-filler annex from Feb 1964 until June 1968. Its Ground Air Transmit Receive (GATR) site (R-12) also remained in operation.

After the site was closed by the military, the property was acquired by Trumbull County, Ohio, and the buildings were turned into the Trumbull County Nursing Home Facility. In the early 1980s, the nursing home was closed due to budget issues, and the Air Force closed down the R-12 GATR site.

== Air Force units and assignments ==
=== Units ===
- 662d Aircraft Control and Warning Squadron,

Activated at Selfridge AFB, MI (L-17), 18 April 1950, not operational
Moved to Lashup site L-18 at Ravenna, OH, 1 January 1951
Moved to Brookfield AFS on 1 October 1951
Moved to Oakdale AFS, PA, 1 November 1959 when site inactivated.

Assignments

- 541st Aircraft Control and Warning Group (30th Air Division), 18 April 1950
- 30th Air Division, 6 February 1952
- 4708th Defense Wing, 16 February 1953
- 30th Air Division, 8 July 1956
- Detroit Air Defense Sector, 1 April-1 November 1959

== See also ==
- List of USAF Aerospace Defense Command General Surveillance Radar Stations
