= Moriarty Air Force Station =

Former US Air Force radar station in New Mexico

Moriarty Air Force Station
- Part of Air Defense Command (ADC)

Site information
- Type: Air Force Station
- Controlled by: United States Air Force

Location
- Location of Moriarty AFS, New Mexico
- Coordinates: 35°01′50″N 105°49′00″W

Site history
- Built: 1951
- In use: 1951–1961

Garrison information
- Garrison: 768th Aircraft Control and Warning Squadron

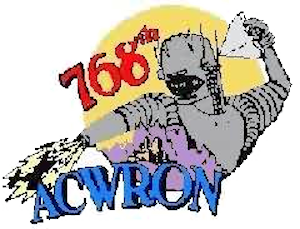
Emblem of the 768th Aircraft Control and Warning Squadron

Moriarty Air Force Station (ADC ID: P-51) is a closed United States Air Force General Surveillance Radar station. It is located 13.5 miles (21.7 km) east-northeast of Moriarty, New Mexico. It was closed in 1961.

== History ==
In late 1951 Air Defense Command selected this mountainous site near Moriarty, New Mexico as one of twenty-eight radar stations built as part of the second segment of the permanent radar surveillance network. Prompted by the start of the Korean War, on 11 July 1950, the Secretary of the Air Force asked the Secretary of Defense for approval to expedite construction of the second segment of the permanent network. Receiving the Defense Secretary's approval on 21 July, the Air Force directed the Corps of Engineers to proceed with construction.

On 1 January 1951 the 768th Aircraft Control and Warning Squadron was activated at Moriarty Air Force Station by the 540th Aircraft Control and Warning Group, and initially the station functioned as a Ground-Control Intercept (GCI) and warning station. As a GCI station, the squadron's role was to guide interceptor aircraft toward unidentified intruders picked up on the unit's radar scopes. The station consisted of 54 buildings; 1 office building, 5 storage buildings, 5 barracks, 19 family housing units and 24 other buildings. The station had a branch of the Kirtland AFB BX, a theater, several service clubs, a library, swimming pool and tennis court. A housing area was built for married personnel.

Initially operating an AN/CPS-5 radar, by September 1952 the 768th AC&W Squadron operated AN/FPS-3 and AN/FPS-5 radars from the station. Six years later an AN/FPS-20 radar replaced the AN/FPS-3 search radar, and an AN/FPS-6 performed height-finding duties.

In 1960 Moriarty Air Force Station was transferred to the Federal Aviation Administration pending inactivation of the 768th, which was discontinued on 1 June 1961. The facility was turned over to the General Services Administration for disposal in 1962 and was turned over to the State of New Mexico and several private owners.

Today what was the station is abandoned, and owned by the State of New Mexico. The remaining buildings are overgrown with vegetation and unused. It is used by the State Highway and Transportation Department for material storage and solid waste disposal. It contains misc equipment such as concrete barriers, old signs, etc. but no indications that they visit the grounds frequently. The remainder of the former station is used for livestock grazing.

The remains of Moriarty Air Force Station consist of six buildings still standing on the site. The buildings are gutted and in a decrepit state due to neglect and vandalism. All other buildings have been torn down. The streets remain on the site in very poor repair.

== Air Force units and assignments ==
Units:

- 768th Aircraft Control and Warning Squadron, Activated 1 January 1951 at Moriarty Air Force Station

Inactivated on 1 June 1986

Assignments:

- 540th Aircraft Control and Warning Group, 1 January 1951
- 34th Air Division, 1 May 1951
- Albuquerque Air Defense Sector, 1 January 1960
- Oklahoma City Air Defense Sector, 15 September 1960 – 1 June 1961

== See also ==
- United States general surveillance radar stations
