= West Mesa Air Force Station =

Closed US Air Force station

West Mesa Air Force Station
- Part of Air Defense Command (ADC)

Site information
- Type: Air Force Station
- Controlled by: United States Air Force

Location
- Location of West Mesa AFS, New Mexico
- Coordinates: 35°04′17″N 106°52′07″W

Site history
- Built: 1956
- In use: 1956-1968

Garrison information
- Garrison: 687th Aircraft Control and Warning Squadron

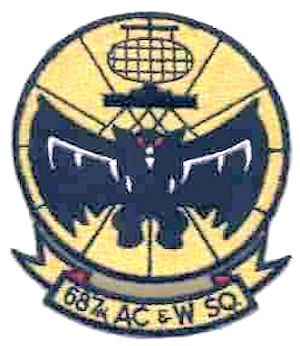
Emblem of the 687th Radar Squadron

West Mesa Air Force Station (ADC ID: M-94, NORAD ID: Z-94) is a closed United States Air Force General Surveillance Radar station. It is located 9.5 miles (15.3 km) west of Albuquerque, New Mexico. It was closed by the Air Force in 1968 and turned over to the Federal Aviation Administration (FAA). The site is now data-tied into the Joint Surveillance System (JSS).

== History ==
West Mesa Air Force Station was established as part of the planned deployment by Air Defense Command of forty-four Mobile radar stations across the United States to support the permanent Radar network established during the Cold War for air defense of the United States. This deployment had been projected to be operational by mid-1952. Funding, constant site changes, construction, and equipment delivery delayed deployment.

A temporary Lashup (L-45) station was operational at Kirtland AFB by late 1949. The Lashup station provided coverage for the Albuquerque-Los Alamos region. The site used AN/CPS-5 and AN/CPS-4 radars, and initially the station functioned as a Ground-Control Intercept (GCI) and warning station. As a GCI station, the squadron's role was to guide interceptor aircraft toward unidentified intruders picked up on the unit's radar scopes.

In late 1952 an AN/CPS-5 radar was still operating on a Lashup basis to provide temporary coverage. Meanwhile, plans to permanently site the radar on Mt. Vulcan (located within what is now the Petroglyph National Monument) were thwarted by an owner who refused to sell at the price offered. Instead, the Air Force selected a site twenty-two miles west of Albuquerque, on the West Mesa.

The 687th Aircraft Control and Warning Squadron (AC&W Sq) was assigned to West Mesa AFS on 1 April 1956. At this site the 687th AC&W Sq used AN/MPS-7 search and AN/MPS-14 height-finder radars. In 1960 West Mesa AFS was also handling air-traffic-control functions for the Federal Aviation Administration.

In 1961 the site hosted an AN/FPS-20 search radar. On 31 July 1963, the site was redesignated as NORAD ID Z-94. By 1966 the 687th AC&W Squadron was operating an AN/FPS-91A search set.

In addition to the main facility, West Mesa operated an AN/FPS-14 Gap Filler site:

- Zuni, NM (M-94B): 34°58′41″N 108°49′47″W

The Air Force inactivated West Mesa Air Force Station on 8 September 1968. In July 1969 the station was officially surplused to the General Aviation Administration. 4.3 acres was transferred to the Federal Aviation Administration in January 1970. The remaining 38 acres were transferred, along with 54 buildings, to the Office of Economic Opportunity in July 1970, which then quitclaimed the property to three private owners. 10 acres of the housing area was then sold to individual private owners.

The FAA continues to operate the AN/FPS-91A search radar and is now data-tied into the Joint Surveillance System (JSS). A vacant area lies between the FAA and family support facilities of the former Air Force Station, and this vacant area is abandoned and deteriorated due to owner neglect and lack of maintenance. Six buildings are still standing on the site, and are physically damaged, some of which have been demolished to their foundations.

== Air Force units and assignments ==
=== Units ===
- 687th Aircraft Control and Warning Squadron (moved to West Mesa AFS 1 April 1956)

Activated on 1 October 1953 at Kirtland AFB, NM
Discontinued and inactivated on 8 September 1968

=== Assignments ===
- 34th Air Division, 1 April 1956
- Albuquerque Air Defense Sector, 1 January 1960
- Oklahoma City Air Defense Sector, 15 September 1960
- 4752d Air Defense Wing, 1 September 1961
- Oklahoma City Air Defense Sector, 25 June 1963
- 31st Air Division, 1 April 1966 – 8 September 1968

== See also ==
- List of USAF Aerospace Defense Command General Surveillance Radar Stations
