= Tierra Amarilla Air Force Station =

Closed United States Air Force General Surveillance Radar station

Tierra Amarilla Air Force Station
- Part of Air Defense Command (ADC)

Site information
- Type: Air Force Station
- Controlled by: United States Air Force

Location
- Location of Tierra Amarilla AFS, New Mexico
- Coordinates: 36°37′24″N 106°39′50″W

Site history
- Built: 1950
- In use: 1950–1959

Garrison information
- Garrison: 767th Aircraft Control and Warning Squadron

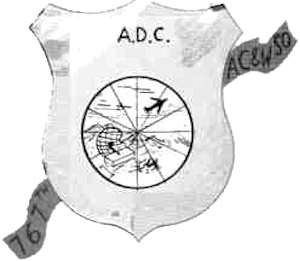
Emblem of the 767th Aircraft Control and Warning Squadron

Tierra Amarilla Air Force Station (ADC ID: P-8) is a closed United States Air Force General Surveillance Radar station. It is located 8.2 miles (13.2 km) southwest of Tierra Amarilla, New Mexico. It was closed in 1959.

== History ==
In late 1951 Air Defense Command selected this site near El Vado, New Mexico, as one of twenty-eight radar stations built as part of the second segment of the permanent radar surveillance network. Prompted by the start of the Korean War, on 11 July 1950, the Secretary of the Air Force asked the Secretary of Defense for approval to expedite construction of the second segment of the permanent network. Receiving the Defense Secretary's approval on 21 July, the Air Force directed the Corps of Engineers to proceed with construction.

On 27 November 1950 the 767th Aircraft Control and Warning Squadron was activated at El Vado, New Mexico (L-44). The unit was later installed at the permanent site (LP-8) several miles to the north-northeast that was activated to provide coverage for Los Alamos National Laboratory. On 1 December 1953, the site was renamed Tierra Amarilla Air Force Station. By September 1952, the 767th AC&W Squadron commenced operation at this new permanent site, and initially the station functioned as a ground-control intercept (GCI) and warning station. As a GCI station, the squadron's role was to guide interceptor aircraft toward unidentified intruders picked up on the unit's radar scopes.

The remoteness of the site from larger cities called for provision of activities at the site. A basketball league played on an outdoor court. Bingo nights and movies contributed to squadron morale. In 1953, an indoor gymnasium was constructed to provide year-round physical recreation. In the mid-1950s, the Air Force leased land for trailers for families.

By 1953 AN/FPS-3 and AN/FPS-5 radars were in operation. A year before the site shut down, the AN/FPS-5 was replaced by an AN/FPS-6 height-finder radar.

On 8 February 1959 the station was ordered closed and the squadron was inactivated. This became the first radar of the permanent ADC network to shut down. In 1961 the station was acquired by the State of New Mexico. The New Mexico Forestry and Resource Conservation Division occupied the site briefly, but it was ultimately abandoned, and turned over to Northern New Mexico Community College (NNMCC) by the New Mexico State Legislature for educational purposes. Northern New Mexico Community College, the owner of the site, did not have the resources to develop the site and operate it. The site was never used again.

The former Tierra Amarilla Air Force Station was placed on the National Register of Historic Places on 26 February 2001. It was one of the first New Mexico sites from the Cold War to be nominated. Today, the site is abandoned with many decrepit buildings standing in various states of decay. It has all the appearance of a ghost town, unused for the past 50 years.

== Air Force units and assignments ==
=== Units ===
- Constituted as the 767th Aircraft Control and Warning Squadron on 14 November 1950

Activated on 27 November 1950 at El Vado, NM
Station renamed Tierra Amarilla Air Force Station on 1 December 1953
Inactivated on 8 February 1959

=== Assignments ===
- Western Air Defense Force, 27 November 1950
- 540th Aircraft Control and Warning Group, 1 January 1951
- 34th Air Division, 1 May 1951 – 8 February 1959

== Gallery ==
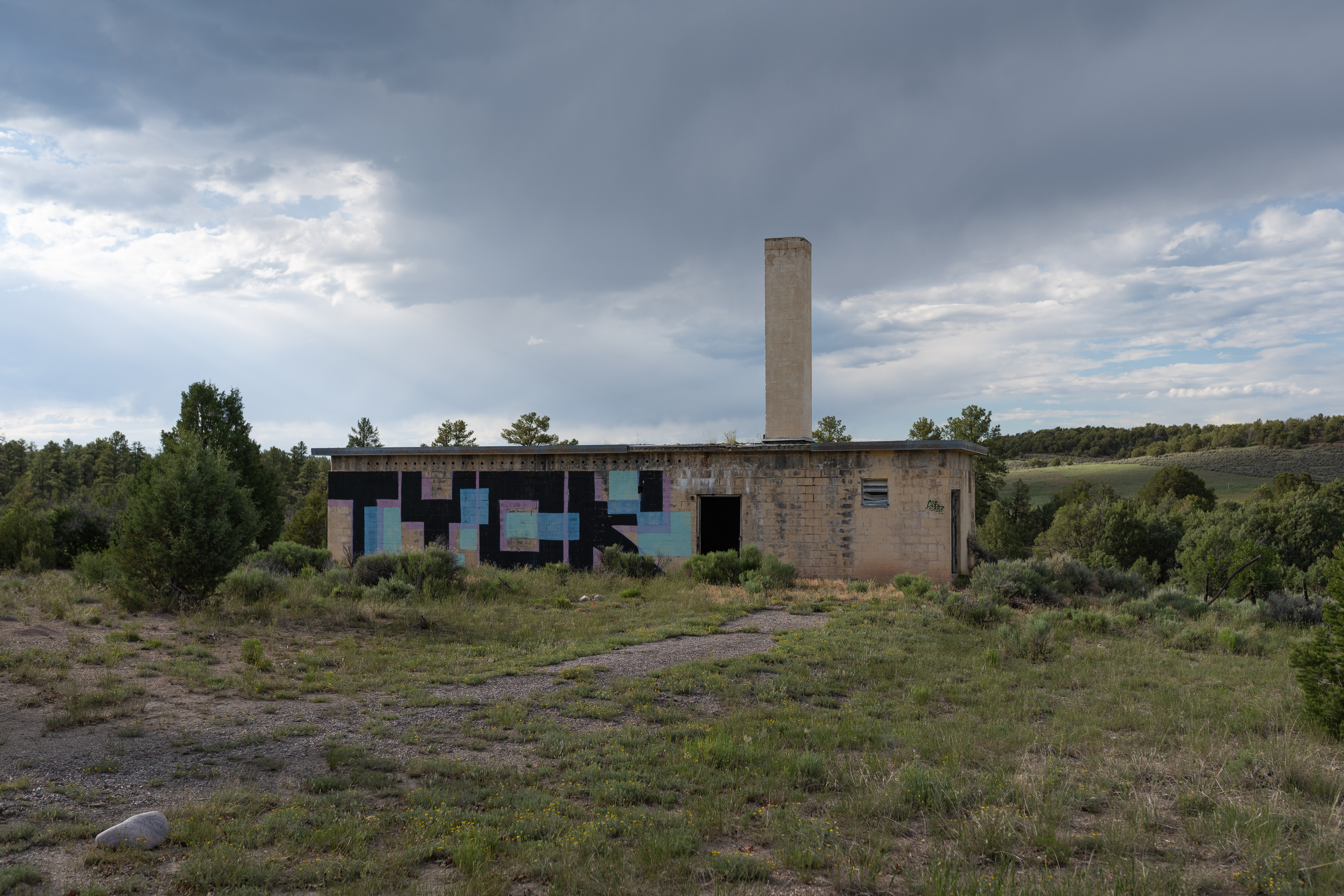
The building housing the former location of the comm. transmitter antenna

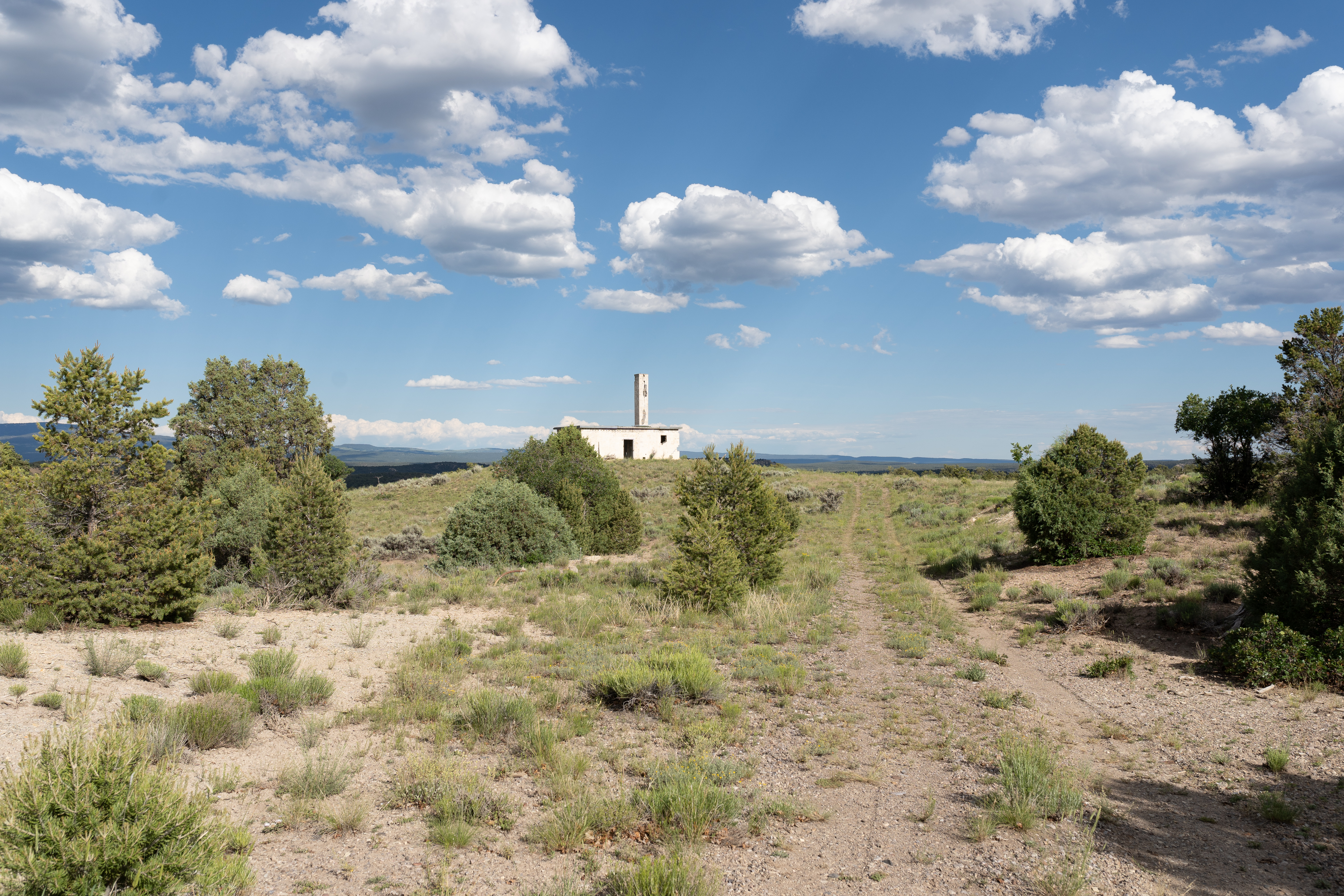
The building housing the former location of the comm. receiver antenna

== See also ==
- United States general surveillance radar stations
