= Continental Divide Air Force Station =

US Air Force radar station

Continental Divide Air Force Station
- Part of Air Defense Command (ADC)

Site information
- Type: Air Force Station
- Controlled by: United States Air Force

Location
- Location of Continental Divide AFS, New Mexico
- Coordinates: 35°23′21″N 108°21′12″W

Site history
- Built: 1951
- In use: 1951–1961

Garrison information
- Garrison: 769th Aircraft Control and Warning Squadron

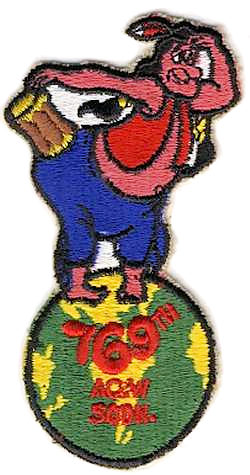
Emblem of the 769th Aircraft Control and Warning Squadron

Continental Divide Air Force Station (ADC ID: P-7) is a closed United States Air Force General Surveillance Radar station. It is located 7.4 miles (11.9 km) west of Thoreau, New Mexico. It was closed in 1961.

== History ==
In late 1951 Air Defense Command selected this mountainous site near Thoreau, New Mexico as one of twenty-eight radar stations built as part of the second segment of the permanent radar surveillance network. Prompted by the start of the Korean War, on 11 July 1950, the Secretary of the Air Force asked the Secretary of Defense for approval to expedite construction of the second segment of the permanent network. Receiving the Defense Secretary's approval on 21 July, the Air Force directed the Corps of Engineers to proceed with construction.

On 1 January 1951 the 769th Aircraft Control and Warning Squadron was activated at the site, designated as Gonzales, NM. The initial assignment of personnel was four officers and forty-three airmen. The radars consisted of AN/FPS-3 and AN/FPS-5 sets, and initially the station functioned as a Ground-Control Intercept (GCI) and warning station. As a GCI station, the squadron's role was to guide interceptor aircraft toward unidentified intruders picked up on the unit's radar scopes. On 1 December 1953, the site was renamed Continental Divide Air Force Station.

Facilities on the station consisted of a multi-purpose building containing a Barbershop, a Day Room/Library, a Gymnasium with a single basketball backboard which doubled as an auditorium for Commander's Call, training lectures, and movies. An outdoor tennis court and also an Airman's barracks was constructed, along with a 16 place trailer park was also available.

In 1955 an AN/FPS-4 height-finder radar was installed, only to be replaced a year later by an AN/FPS-6 model. At the end of 1960, this radar was transferred to the Federal Aviation Administration pending inactivation of the 769th on 1 July 1961 due to budget reductions.

After the station was closed, the site was turned over to the General Services Administration for disposal. The United States Forest Service used the facilities until 1974 when it was provided to the Bureau of Indian Affairs for their use. In December 1985 the site was closed and the five buildings remaining on the site were torn down, the site restored to a natural state.

Today, what once was Continental Divide AFS has been razed. The streets of the station remain, and a few buildings are in very decrepit condition. It has largely returned to the elements.

== Air Force units and assignments ==
=== Units ===
- Constituted as the 769th Aircraft Control and Warning Squadron on 14 November 1950

Activated at Gonzales, New Mexico on 27 November 1950
Site renamed Continental Divide Air Force Station on 1 December 1953
Discontinued and inactivated on 1 July 1961

=== Assignments ===
- 540th Aircraft Control and Warning Group, 27 November 1950
- 34th Air Division, 1 May 1951
- Albuquerque Air Defense Sector, 1 January 1960
- Oklahoma City Air Defense Sector, 15 September 1960 – 1 July 1961

== See also ==
- United States general surveillance radar stations
