= Las Cruces Air Force Station =

Closed United States Air Force General Surveillance Radar station

Las Cruces Air Force Station
- Part of Air Defense Command (ADC)

Site information
- Type: Air Force Station
- Controlled by: United States Air Force

Location
- Location of Las Cruces AFS, New Mexico
- Coordinates: 32°15′34″N 106°58′36″W

Site history
- Built: 1954
- In use: 1954-1963

Garrison information
- Garrison: 685th Aircraft Control and Warning Squadron

Las Cruces Air Force Station (ADC ID: M-95) is a closed United States Air Force General Surveillance Radar station. It is located 12.1 miles (19.5 km) west-southwest of Las Cruces, New Mexico. It was closed in 1963.

== History ==
Las Cruces Air Force Station was established as part of the planned deployment by Air Defense Command of forty-four Mobile radar stations across the United States to support the permanent Radar network established during the Cold War for air defense of the United States. This deployment had been projected to be operational by mid-1952. Funding, constant site changes, construction, and equipment delivery delayed deployment.

The 685th Aircraft Control and Warning Squadron was assigned to Las Cruces AFS by the 34th Air Division on 1 December 1954. The site consisted of 25 buildings, five barracks, 27 family housing units and several maintenance buildings. It was staffed by eighteen officers and 208 aviators and NCOs. Facilities included a station theater, where films were shown four nights a week; an NCO club (soft drinks and beer only, no spirits were sold); a Library; a volleyball and badminton court; a swimming pool and a ping pong table and a baseball diamond. A small BX was available with limited goods and a small dispensary.

By 1955, the Squadron began operating an AN/MPS-7 radar at this site, and initially the station functioned as a Ground-Control Intercept (GCI) and warning station. As a GCI station, the squadron's role was to guide interceptor aircraft toward unidentified intruders picked up on the unit's radar scopes. Over the next two years equipment additions and deletions included AN/MPS-8, AN/TPS-1D, and AN/MPS-14 radars. In 1958 the AN/MPS-8 and the AN/TPS-1D were retired.

In addition to the main facility, Las Cruces operated several AN/FPS-14 Gap Filler sites:

- El Paso, TX (M-95A): 31°49′33″N 105°59′20″W
- Columbus, NM (M-95B): 31°47′56″N 107°44′03″W
- Sierra Blanca, TX (M-95E): 31°41′53″N 105°22′57″W
- Gage, NM (M-95G): 32°12′26″N 108°07′35″W

By 1961 the 685th was operating AN/FPS-20 search and AN/MPS-14 height-finder radars, and the AN/MPS-7 was retired. In March 1963 the Air Force ordered the site to shut down; operations ceased 1 August 1963. The site was turned over to the General Services Administration in August 1964 and was sold to private individuals in April 1965.

Today, most of the station remains intact and in relatively good condition. It is used as the Dona Ana County Fairgrounds and speedway.

== See also ==
- List of USAF Aerospace Defense Command General Surveillance Radar Stations
