= Avenger Field =

Airport in Texas, United States of America

Avenger Field (former Avenger Army Airfield)
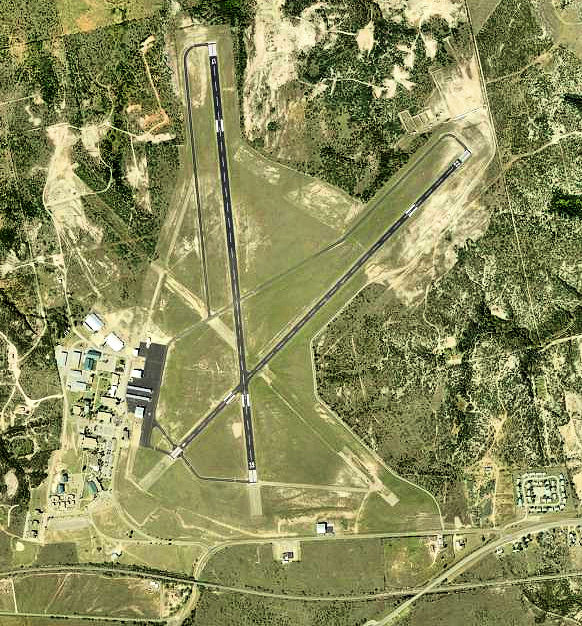
- USGS 2006 orthophoto
- IATA: SWW; ICAO: KSWW; FAA LID: SWW

Summary
- Airport type: Public
- Owner: City of Sweetwater
- Serves: Sweetwater, Texas
- Elevation AMSL: 2,380 ft (730 m)
- Coordinates: 32°28′02″N 100°27′59″W

Map
- Location within Texas

Runways
Direction	Length		Surface
Direction	ft	m	Surface
17/35	5,840	1,780	Asphalt
4/22	5,658	1,725	Asphalt

Statistics (2024)
- Aircraft operations (year ending 3/20/2024): 3,00
- Based aircraft: 16
- Source: Federal Aviation Administration

Avenger Field (IATA: SWW, ICAO: KSWW, FAA LID: SWW) is a Texas airport in Nolan County, three miles west of Sweetwater. The National Plan of Integrated Airport Systems for 2011–2015 called it a general aviation facility.

== Facilities ==
Avenger Field covers 896 acres (363 ha) at an elevation of 2,380 feet (725 m). It has two asphalt runways: 17/35 is 5,840 by 100 feet (1,780 x 30 m) and 4/22 is 5,658 by 75 feet (1,725 x 23 m).

In the year ending March 20, 2024, the airport had 3,900 general aviation aircraft operations, averaging 75 per week. 16 aircraft were then based at the airport: 13 single-engine, 1 multi-engine and 2 helicopter.

== History ==
As a Texas World War II Army Airfield, "Avenger Field" opened in August 1941 as a United States Army Air Forces training base of the AAF Flying Training Command, Gulf Coast Air Corps Training Center (later Central Flying Training Command).

=== Origins ===
Avenger Field was the largest all-female air base in American history. Its origins date to the 1920s as the Sweetwater Municipal Airport. At the airport, a small flight school operated with World War I surplus Curtiss JN-4s and Curtiss Robins.

In the spring of 1942, the flight school was taken over by the Plosser-Prince Air Academy, which moved to the airport from California. Plosser-Prince was contracted by the Royal Canadian Air Force to train British and American volunteer pilots. The airport became known as British Flying Training School No. 7. On 15 June 1942, about 100 male flight cadets began a course that included primary, basic and advanced training. Just before they arrived, the Sweetwater Airport was renamed "Avenger Field" in a contest won by Mrs. Grace Faver.

In August 1942 the United States Government closed the private flying school and took it over as a United States Army Air Forces military installation. Avenger Field was to be turned over to the Air Transport Command as a transition school for experienced airline pilots in single-engine Vultee BT-13 Valiant basic trainers. From Avenger Field, the graduates would be sent to twin-engine schools and subsequently for overseas duty as USAAF pilots.

=== Women Airforce Service Pilots ===
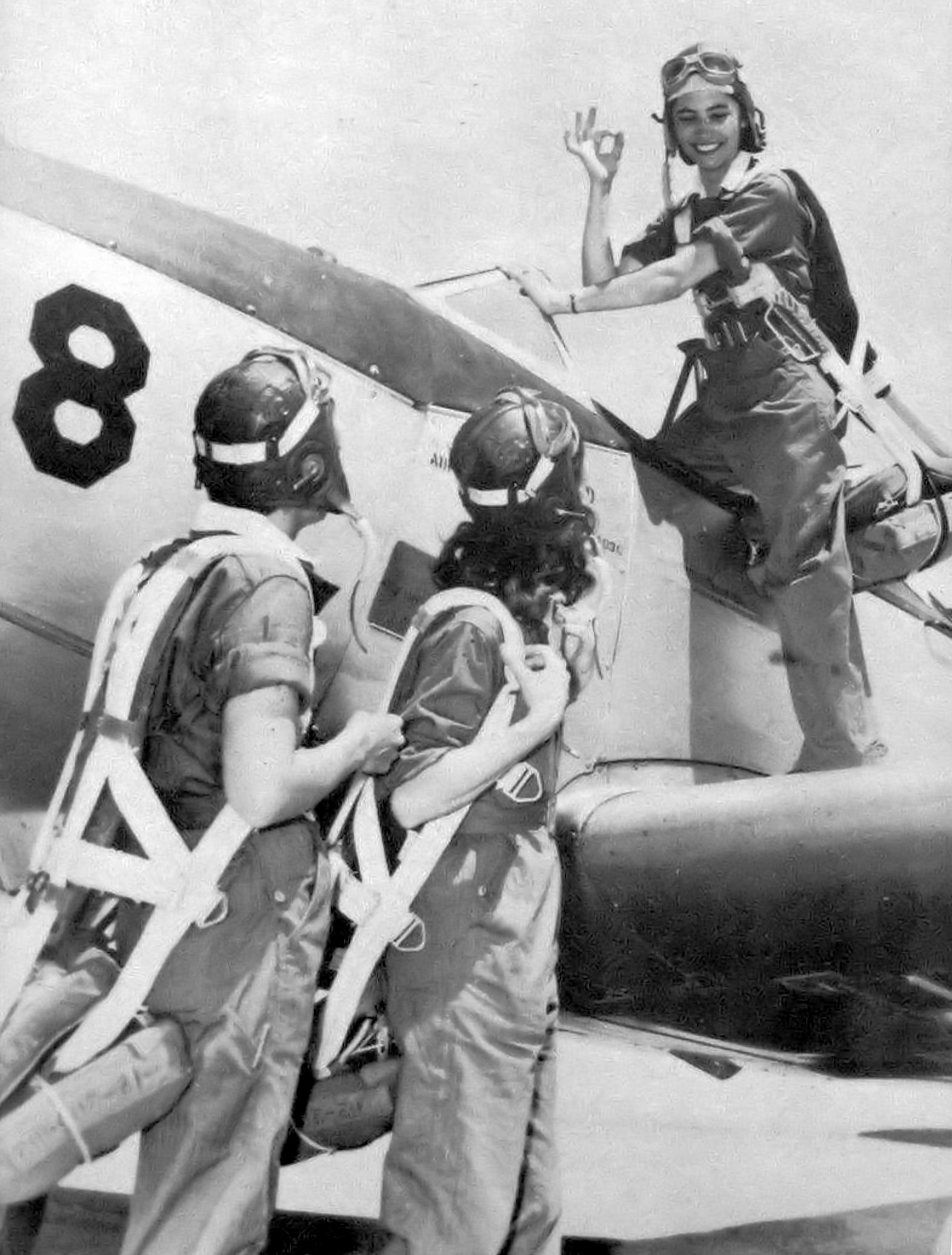
Avenger Field WASPs and training aircraft

At this time, Jacqueline Cochran was making plans for a training program for women pilots to participate in the war effort. Working with the Army Air Forces, she established a training facility at the Howard Hughes field in Houston, Texas, for Women Airforce Service Pilots, or WASPs as it was known. However, she was unable to develop a satisfactory school there. In January 1943, she and the AAF began to look for an alternative location. Avenger Field was chosen due to its multi-phase training capability and other assets. The field was acquired by the Houston contractors from Plosser-Prince, and in February 1943 Avenger Field became an all-female installation except for a few male instructors and other officers. The field was officially assigned to the 318th Army Air Forces Flying Training Detachment, 31st Flying Training Wing. Flight training was contracted to Aviation Enterprises.

Classes entered the WASP program at Avenger Field in monthly intervals. A total of 18 classes completed training: 8 in 1943 and 10 in 1944. Of the 25,000 women who applied for flight training, 1,830 were accepted, and of those, 1,074 received their wings. Training for women pilots paralleled but did not duplicate that given the men. Because the women were expected to go into ferrying, emphasis was placed on cross-country flying. Gunnery and formation flight training was omitted.

The first course was four months long. Although the hours were flexible and varied according to previous training, 115 flying hours were generally called for in addition to 180 hours of ground instruction. As the experience level of the trainees declined, the course was expanded and revised. By the end of 1943, the length had been extended to 27 weeks and the flying hours to 210. Few curricular changes were made in 1944; the main one was increased training from 27 to 30 weeks.

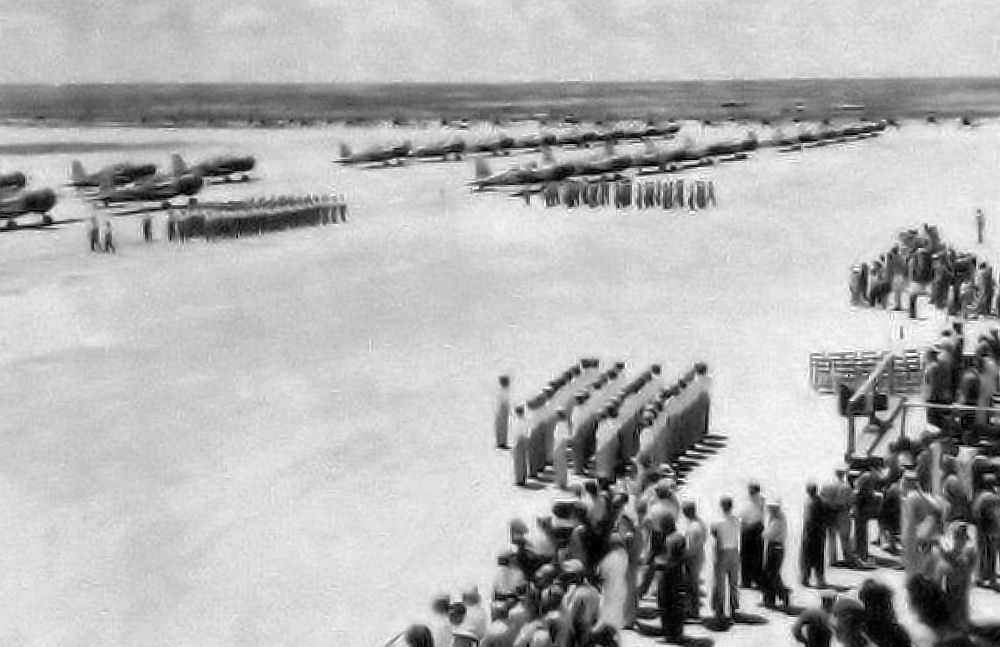
Avenger Field WASP Class Graduation Ceremony

The WASPs were employed under the Civil Service program. It was always assumed they would become part of the Army when a proper place within the military organization could be found for them. In fact, bills were introduced in Congress to give them military rank, but even with General Arnold's support, all efforts failed to absorb the WASPs into the military.

Avenger Field remained a WASP training base until being disbanded in December 1944. 1,074 women pilots were trained at the facility including 37 that gave their lives in the service of their country. On 20 December the Army Air Forces disbanded the WASP program and the WASPs returned to civilian life with no veterans' benefits. In 1977 Congress finally granted benefits to the 850 remaining WASPs.

At the end of the war the military decided the field was not needed and turned it over to the local government for civil use.

The first airline flights were on Pioneer in 1947; successor Continental's DC-3s stopped there until 1958–59.

=== Cold War radar station ===
The United States Air Force Air Defense Command exercised a right of return to Avenger Field in 1955 when Sweetwater Air Force Station was established as a USAF Aerospace Defense Command General Surveillance Radar Station. The 683d Aircraft Control and Warning Squadron was assigned to Sweetwater AFS (M-89) on 1 March 1956, being established in new facilities built on the northwest part of the station. New military family housing was also constructed just to the east of the airport. It initially operated AN/MPS-11 search and AN/TPS-10D height-finder radars, and initially the station functioned as a Ground-Control Intercept (GCI) and warning station. As a GCI station, the squadron's role was to guide interceptor aircraft toward unidentified intruders picked up on the unit's radar scopes. In 1961 an AN/FPS-6A replaced the AN/TPS-10D height-finder radar.

In 1963 the AN/FPS-6A evolved into an AN/FPS-90, and on 31 July, the site was redesignated as NORAD ID Z-89.

In addition to the main facility, Sweetwater operated several AN/FPS-14 Gap Filler sites:

- Big Spring, TX (M-89B): 32°13′50″N 101°29′31″W
- Sidney, TX (M-89E): 31°54′42″N 098°42′06″W

In 1967 the search radar was replaced by an AN/FPS-67B. The Air Force ordered Sweetwater AFS closed in 1969 due to budget reductions and the phasing down of Air Defense Command. The 683d Aircraft Control and Warning Squadron was inactivated on 30 September 1969.

Today most of the cold war air force station has been redeveloped and new buildings have taken their place. A few buildings remain, and the Air Force housing area remains, now single-family homes.

== See also ==
- Texas World War II Army Airfields
- 31st Flying Training Wing (World War II)
- List of airports in Texas

== Other sources ==
- This article incorporates public domain material from the Air Force Historical Research Agency
- Shaw, Frederick J. (2004), Locating Air Force Base Sites History's Legacy, Air Force History and Museums Program, United States Air Force, Washington DC, 2004.
- Thole, Lou (1999), Forgotten Fields of America : World War II Bases and Training, Then and Now - Vol. 2. Publisher: Pictorial Histories Pub, ISBN 1-57510-051-7
- A Handbook of Aerospace Defense Organization 1946–1980, by Lloyd H. Cornett and Mildred W. Johnson, Office of History, Aerospace Defense Center, Peterson Air Force Base, Colorado
- Winkler, David F. (1997), Searching the skies: the legacy of the United States Cold War defense radar program. Prepared for United States Air Force Headquarters Air Combat Command.
- Information for Sweetwater AFS, TX
