= Brunswick Air Force Station =

Closed United States Air Force station in Brunswick, Maine

Brunswick Air Force Station
- Part of Air Defense Command (ADC)

Site information
- Type: Air Force Station
- Code: ADC ID: P-13 NORAD ID: Z-13
- Controlled by: United States Air Force

Location
- Location of Brunswick AFS, Maine
- Coordinates: 43°53′44″N 069°55′24″W

Site history
- Built: 1951
- In use: 1951-1965

Garrison information
- Garrison: 654th Aircraft Control and Warning (later Radar) Squadron

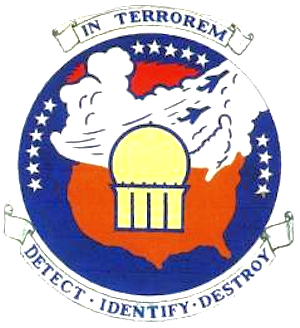
654th Radar Squadron Emblem

Brunswick Air Force Station is a closed United States Air Force General Surveillance Radar station. It is located 2.5 miles (4.0 km) east-southeast of Brunswick, Maine. It was closed in 1965.

Brunswick AFS was one of the first of twenty-four stations of the 1949 permanent Air Defense Command radar network. On 2 December 1948, the Air Force directed the Army Corps of Engineers to proceed with construction of this and the other twenty-three sites.

== History ==
The 654th Aircraft Control and Warning Squadron was assigned to Brunswick on 1 January 1951 and began operating a pair of AN/CPS-6B radars from here in October, assuming coverage previously provided by the Lashup site at Grenier AFB, New Hampshire (L-4), and initially the station functioned as a Ground-Control Intercept (GCI) and warning station. As a GCI station, the squadron's role was to guide interceptor aircraft toward unidentified intruders picked up on the unit's radar scopes.

An AN/FPS-8 radar was added in 1955. The Air Force eventually converted this unit to an AN/GPS-3 radar that served at Brunswick until the 1960s. In 1958 the AN/CPS-6Bs were retired and two AN/FPS-6 height-finder radars were installed. During 1959 Brunswick AFS joined the Semi Automatic Ground Environment (SAGE) system, feeding data to DC-05 at Topsham AFS, Maine. After joining, the squadron was re-designated as the 654th Radar Squadron (SAGE) on 1 October 1959.

The radar squadron provided information 24/7 the SAGE Direction Center where it was analyzed to determine range, direction altitude speed and whether or not aircraft were friendly or hostile. On 31 July 1963, the site was redesignated as NORAD ID Z-13.

In addition to the main facility, Brunswick AFS operated an AN/FPS-14 unmanned Gap Filler site:

- Sedgwick, ME (P-13A) 44°18′51″N 068°38′22″W

Over the years, the equipment at the station was upgraded or modified to improve the efficiency and accuracy of the information gathered by the radars. The site was slated to receive an AN/FPS-35 search radar, but plans were cancelled, probably due to pending site deactivation. This site was removed from service on 25 June 1965 along with other ADC sites as part of a consolidation of resources.

The facility was eventually absorbed into the now-defunct Naval Air Station Brunswick, and its facilities were integrated into the NAS. A large radar tower remains standing. The Gap Filler support building at Sedgwick remains, the radar long since dismantled.

== Air Force units and assignments ==
Units:

- 654th Aircraft Control and Warning Squadron, Assigned 8 March 1951

Was activated 8 December 1949 at Grenier Field, New Hampshire, moved ca. 1 April 1950 at Dow AFB (L-1), ME (not equipped or manned)
Redesignated 654th Radar Squadron (SAGE), 1 October 1959
Discontinued 25 June 1965

Assignments:

- 540th Aircraft Control and Warning Group, 8 March 1951
- 32d Air Division, 6 February 1952
- 4707th Defense Wing, 16 February 1956
- 32d Air Division, 1 March 1956
- Bangor Air Defense Sector, 15 August 1958
- Boston Air Defense Sector, 1 August 1962 – 25 June 1965

== See also ==
- List of USAF Aerospace Defense Command General Surveillance Radar Stations
