= 4735th Air Defense Group =

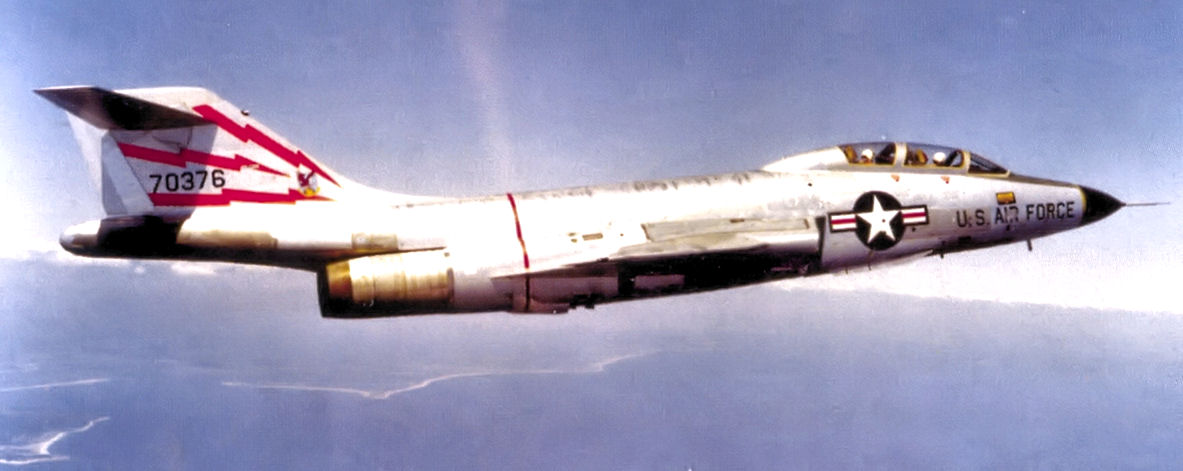
- F-101B Voodoo of the 60th Fighter-Interceptor Squadron
- Active: 1957–1959
- Country: United States
- Branch: United States Air Force
- Type: Fighter interceptor
- Role: Air Defense

The 4735th Air Defense Group is a discontinued United States Air Force organization. It was assigned to the Boston Air Defense Sector at Otis Air Force Base, Massachusetts, where it was last active in 1959.

The 4735th was formed in 1957 to provide a single command and support organization for the two fighter interceptor squadrons of Air Defense Command (ADC) at Otis when the 33rd Fighter Wing inactivated and the 551st Airborne Early Warning and Control Wing became the host at Otis. One of its squadrons was the first ADC unit to fly the McDonnell F-101 Voodoo. The group was discontinued after the 58th Fighter-Interceptor Squadron moved in 1959, leaving only a single fighter squadron at Otis.

== History ==
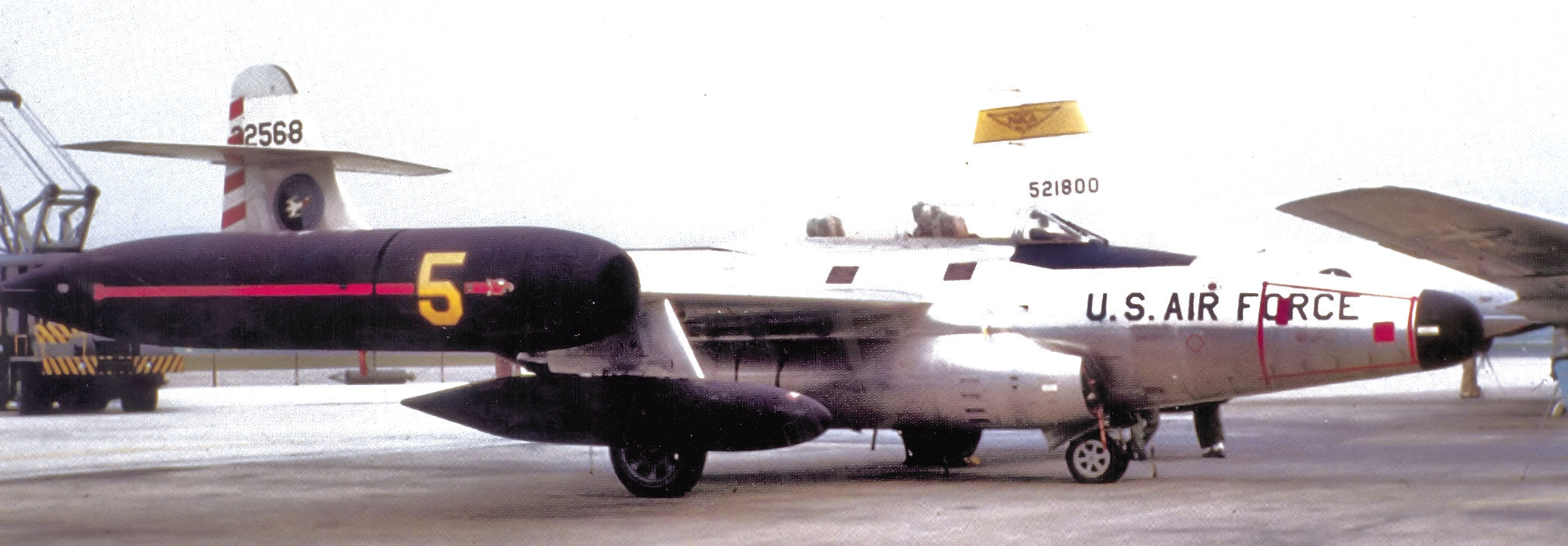
58th Fighter-Interceptor Squadron F-89 Scorpion at Otis AFB (Note: Aircraft is Northrop F-89D-60-NO Scorpion, serial 53-2528. This aircraft was later upgraded to an F-89J and transferred to the Wisconsin Air National Guard Dirkx, Marco (7 June 2025). "1953 USAF Serial Numbers". Joe Baugher’s Serial Number List.)

The 4735th Air Defense Group was organized in August 1957 at Otis Air Force Base, Massachusetts. At Otis, the group replaced the 33d Fighter Group (Air Defense) as the headquarters for the 33d's operational squadrons when the 33rd Fighter Wing (Air Defense) and its components were inactivated. The 33rd Wing's 33rd Air Base Group was simultaneously replaced as the USAF host organization for Otis by elements of the 551st Airborne Early Warning and Control Wing's 551st Air Base Group.

The 58th Fighter-Interceptor Squadron (FIS), flying Northrop F-89 Scorpion aircraft, and the 60th FIS, flying Lockheed F-94 Starfire aircraft, former squadrons of the 33rd Fighter Group, were reassigned to the 4735th. The 58th's Scorpions were a mix of F-89Hs, armed with AIM-4 Falcons and Mighty Mouse rockets and F-89Js, capable of carrying the nuclear armed AIR-2 Genie. The 60th flew Mighty Mouse rocket armed F-94Cs. All models were equipped with data link for interception control through the Semi-Automatic Ground Environment system.

The group assumed responsibility for air defense of eastern Massachusetts. Aircraft maintenance for the two fighter squadrons was performed by the 602nd Consolidated Aircraft Maintenance Squadron (CAMS), which was activated at Otis and assigned to the group. In February 1959, the 60th FIS converted to McDonnell F-101 Voodoo aircraft, becoming the first F-101 squadron in Air Defense Command. The 4735th was discontinued on 1 August 1959 when the 58th FIS relocated to Walker Air Force Base, New Mexico, leaving only one operational fighter squadron at Otis. The 60th FIS was reassigned directly to Boston Air Defense Sector, and the 602nd CAMS was inactivated.

== Lineage ==
- Designated and organized as 4735th Air Defense Group on 18 August 1957

Discontinued on 1 August 1959

=== Assignments ===
- Boston Air Defense Sector, 18 August 1957 – 1 August 1959

=== Components ===
- 58th Fighter-Interceptor Squadron, 18 August 1957 – 1 August 1959
- 60th Fighter-Interceptor Squadron, 18 August 1957 – 1 August 1959
- 602nd Consolidated Aircraft Maintenance Squadron, 18 August 1957 – 8 July 1958

=== Aircraft ===
- Northrop F-89H Scorpion, 1957–1959
- Northrop F-89J Scorpion, 1957–1959
- Lockheed F-94C Starfighter, 1957–1959
- McDonnell F-101B Voodoo, 1959

=== Commanders ===
- Col. David B. Tudor, 1958

== See also ==
- List of United States Air Force Aerospace Defense Command Interceptor Squadrons
- F-89 Scorpion units of the United States Air Force
- F-94 Starfire units of the United States Air Force
