= Rye Air Force Station =

US Air Force radar station

Rye Air Force Station
- Part of Air Defense Command (ADC)

Site information
- Type: Air Force Station (radar station)
- Controlled by: United States Air Force

Location
- Location of Rye AFS, New Hampshire
- Coordinates: 43°02′41″N 070°42′51″W

Site history
- Built: 1956
- In use: 1956-1957

Garrison information
- Garrison: 644th Aircraft Control and Warning Squadron

Rye Air Force Station (ADC ID: M-104) is a closed United States Air Force General Surveillance Radar station. It is located 3.1 miles (5.0 km) southeast of Portsmouth, New Hampshire in what is now Odiorne Point State Park. It was closed in 1957.

== History ==
Rye AFS was part of the planned deployment of 44 mobile radar stations by Air Defense Command in 1952 to provide protection for Strategic Air Command Bases (such as the nearby Pease Air Force Base) and to support the permanent deployment of the 75 stations of the ADC radar network around the perimeter of the country. This deployment had been projected to be operational by mid-1952. Funding, constant site changes, construction, and equipment delivery delayed deployment.

Constructed at the former Fort Dearborn coastal artillery site, the station became operational in 1956 when the 644th Aircraft Control and Warning Squadron activated an AN/TPS-1D radar at the site, and initially the station functioned as a Ground-Control Intercept (GCI) and warning station. As a GCI station, the squadron's role was to guide interceptor aircraft toward unidentified intruders picked up on the unit's radar scopes.

It was soon closed due to a budget reduction in 1957. The site was re-equipped with an AN/FPS-14 and became an unmanned Gap Filler for North Truro AFS, Massachusetts, as site Fort Dearborn, P-10B. It was finally closed in June 1968.

Today, the site is the location of Odiorne Point State Park. Many former parts of Fort Dearborn remain. Rye AFS has been obliterated.

== See also ==
- List of USAF Aerospace Defense Command General Surveillance Radar Stations
