= 697th Aircraft Control and Warning Squadron =

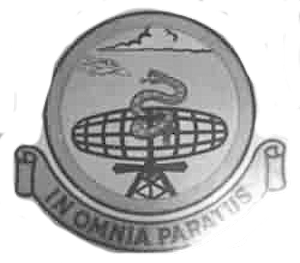
- Emblem of the 697th Aircraft Control and Warning Squadron
- Active: 1956–1963
- Country: United States
- Branch: United States Air Force
- Type: General Radar Surveillance

The 697th Aircraft Control and Warning Squadron is an inactive United States Air Force unit. It was last assigned to the Oklahoma City Air Defense Sector, Aerospace Defense Command, stationed at Pyote Air Force Station, Texas. It was inactivated on 1 August 1963.

The unit was a General Surveillance Radar squadron providing for the air defense of the United States.

== Lineage ==
- Established as the 697th Aircraft Control and Warning Squadron

Activated on 8 December 1956
Inactivated on 1 August 1963

== Assignments ==
- 34th Air Division, 8 December 1956
- Albuquerque Air Defense Sector, 1 January 1960
- Oklahoma City Air Defense Sector, 15 September 1960
- 4752d Air Defense Wing, 1 September 1961
- Oklahoma City Air Defense Sector, 25 June – 1 August 1963

== Stations ==
- Kirtland AFB, New Mexico, 8 December 1956
- Pyote AFS, Texas, 21 February 1957 – 1 August 1963
