= 21st Air Division =

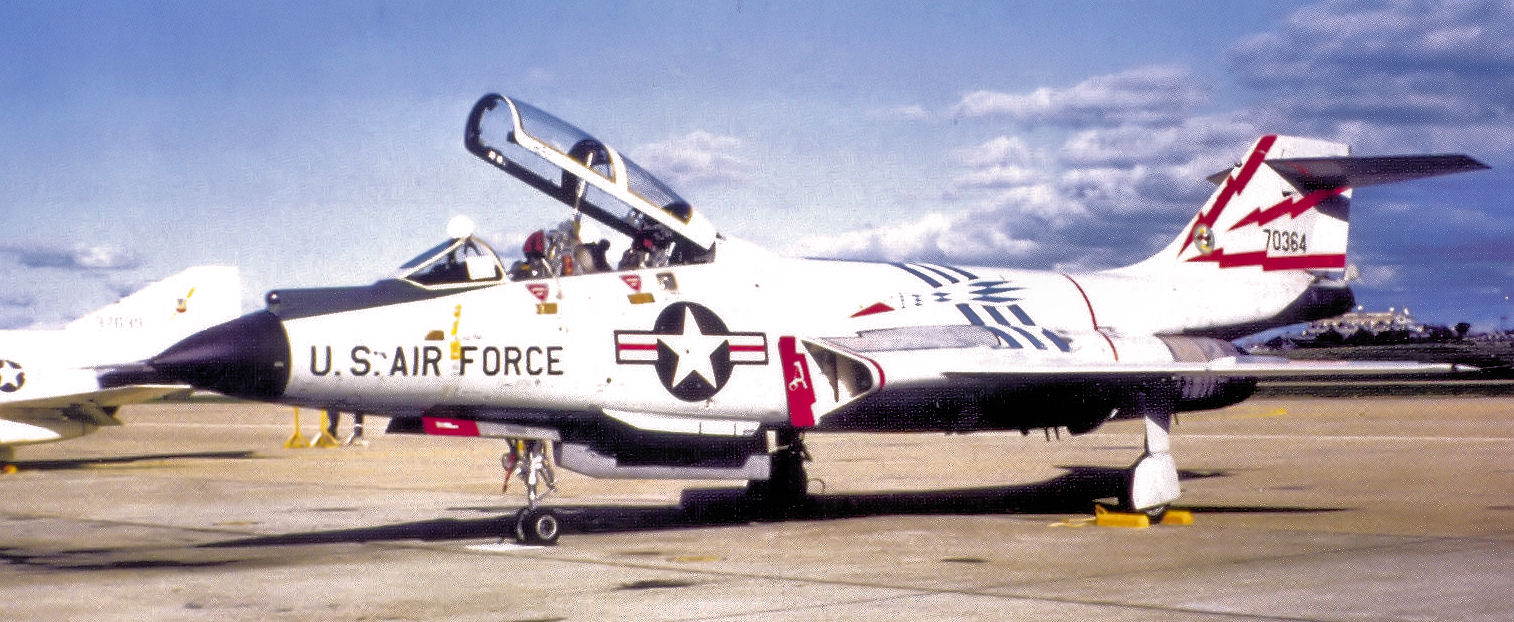
- McDonnell F-101B of the division's 60th Fighter-Interceptor Squadron at Otis AFB, 1970
- Active: 1942–1946; 1946–1949; 1951–1964; 1966–1967; 1969–1983
- Country: United States
- Branch: United States Air Force
- Role: Command of air defense forces
- Part of: Tactical Air Command (ADTAC)
- Decorations: Air Force Outstanding Unit Award

Insignia
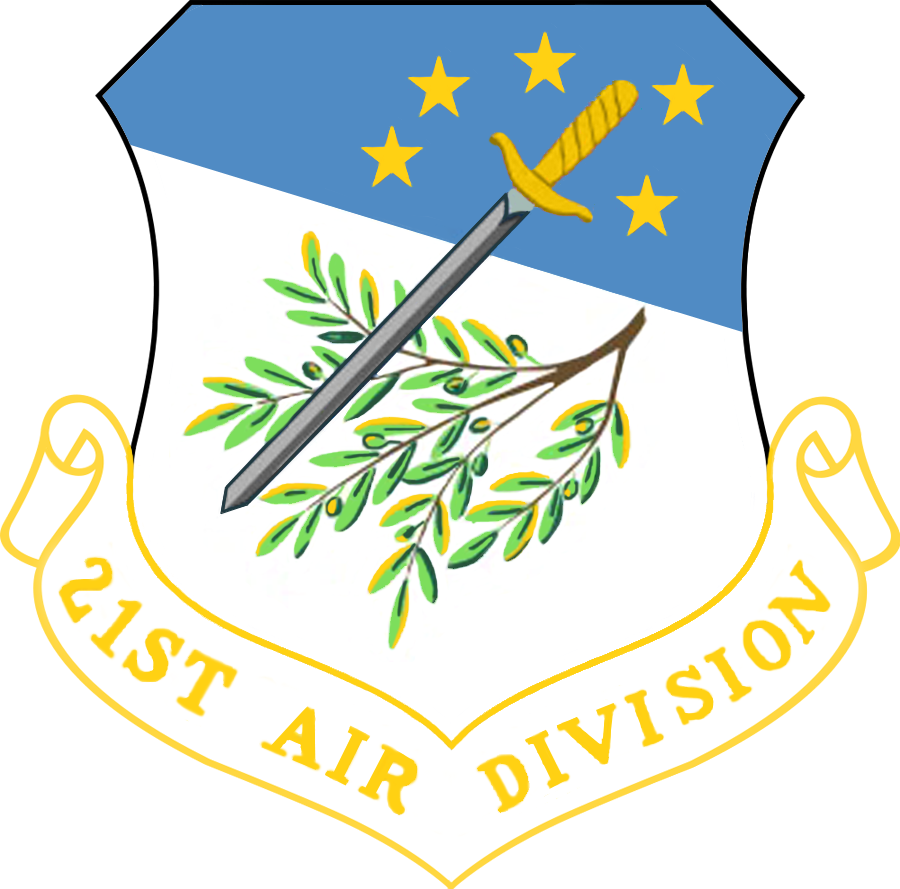
- 21st Air Division emblem (approved 17 July 1952)

The 21st Air Division (21st AD) is an inactive United States Air Force organization. Its last assignment was with Tactical Air Command, being stationed at Griffiss Air Force Base, New York. It was inactivated on 23 September 1983.

== History ==
=== World War II ===
Initially established in 1942 as the 21st Bombardment Wing, the organization functioned as a staging wing for Second Air Force, and later as a command, processing heavy bombardment crews and aircraft for overseas movement, and then processing men returning from overseas, from 1942–1946.

=== Air Force Reserve ===
From December 1946, it performed routine training duties in the Air Force Reserve through 27 June 1949 when it was inactivated due to budget reductions.

=== Strategic Air Command ===
Reactivated as an intermediate command echelon of Strategic Air Command in February 1951 at Forbes Air Force Base, Kansas. The 21st Air Division controlled B-47 Stratojet medium bombardment wings at Forbes and Lake Charles Air Force Base, Louisiana. It was responsible for aircrew training, bomber replacement crews, and replacements for strategic reconnaissance slots until September 1964 when the B-47 was phased out of the inventory.

=== Air Defense Command ===
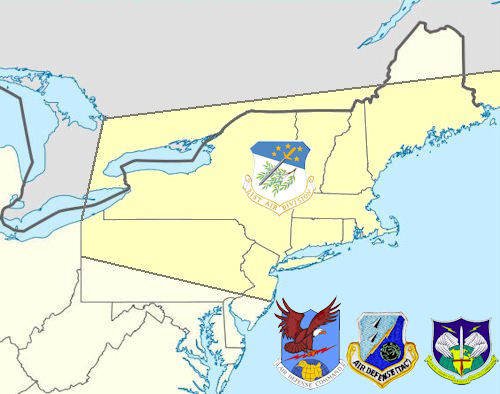
21st Air Division ADC/TAC/NORAD Region AOR 1966–1983

The command was reactivated by Air Defense Command (ADC) in January 1966 at McGuire Air Force Base, New Jersey as one of ten new Air Divisions organized by the command to replace inactivating Air Defense Sectors in an organizational realignment. Assumed additional designation of 21st NORAD Region after activation of the NORAD Combat Operations Center at the Cheyenne Mountain Complex, Colorado and reporting was transferred to NORAD from ADC at Ent Air Force Base in April 1966.

Under ADC the 21st AD was placed under First Air Force and assumed the jurisdiction of the former New York Air Defense Sector, controlling interceptor and radar units over eastern Pennsylvania, New Jersey, the New York City/Long Island area and the coast of Connecticut, Rhode Island and Massachusetts, including Cape Cod. This included operations of the Semi Automatic Ground Environment (SAGE) blockhouse DC-01. For operational control the division was also the 21st NORAD/CONRAD Region.

During this time, it participated in air defense training exercises, accomplished live and simulated intercepts, and directed numerous flying sorties until inactivation in December 1967 as part of an ADC consolidation of intermediate level command and control organizations, driven by budget reductions required to fund USAF operations in Southeast Asia.

The 21st AD was reactivated in November 1969 under Aerospace Defense Command (ADCOM) at Hancock Field, New York. The command provided air defense over most of Pennsylvania, New Jersey, New York and the New England area, commanding interceptor and radar stations. Also included were ADCOM radar stations located in Newfoundland, Canada. In addition command of the SAGE DC-03/CC-01 blockhouse was assumed by the 21st AD, as well as CIM-10 Bomarc surface-to-air anti-aircraft missile squadrons near Otis Air Force Base, Massachusetts, Niagara Falls Air Force Missile Site, New York and McGuire Air Force Base, New Jersey.

In 1975, a new JCS Unified Command Plan designated Air Defense Command as a specified command and changed its name to the Aerospace Defense Command (ADCOM) on 1 July 1975. The division assumed additional designation 21st ADCOM Region for operational control on 8 December 1978. Air Defense ADCOM was reorganized on 1 October 1979. The atmospheric defense resources (interceptors and warning radars) of ADCOM. including the 21st AD were reassigned to Tactical Air Command (ADTAC). It moved to Griffiss Air Force Base, New York in 1983 when Hancock Field was closed.

In 1983, when the air defense mission of CONUS was reassigned to the Air National Guard, the 21st Air Division (ADTAC) was inactivated and its assets transferred to Northeast Air Defense Sector.

== Lineage ==
- Established as the 21st Bombardment Wing on 16 December 1942

Activated on 22 December 1942
Redesignated I Staging Command on 27 September 1945
Inactivated on 3 April 1946

- Activated in the Reserve on 20 December 1946

Redesignated: 21st Bombardment Wing, Very Heavy on 31 December 1946
Redesignated: 21st Air Division, Bombardment on 16 April 1948
Inactivated on 27 June 1949

- Redesignated 21st Air Division on 5 February 1951

Activated on 16 February 1951
Inactivated on 8 April 1952
Organized on 8 April 1952
Discontinued on 16 October 1952

- Activated on 16 October 1952

Redesignated 21st Strategic Aerospace Division on 15 February 1962
Discontinued and inactivated on 1 September 1964

- Activated on 20 January 1966 (not organized)

Organized on 1 April 1966
Discontinued and inactivated on 31 December 1967

- Activated on 19 November 1969

Inactivated on 23 September 1983

=== Assignments ===
- Second Air Force, 22 December 1942
- Continental Air Forces, 18 July 1945
- Fourth Air Force, 19 November 1945 – 3 April 1946
- Fourteenth Air Force, 20 December 1946
- Ninth Air Force, 22 December 1948
- Fourteenth Air Force, 1 February – 27 June 1949

- Fifteenth Air Force, 16 July 1952
- Eighth Air Force, 1 July 1955
- Second Air Force, 1 January 1959 – 1 September 1964
- First Air Force, 1 April 1966 – 31 December 1967
- Aerospace Defense Command, 19 November 1969
- Air Defense, Tactical Air Command, 1 October 1979 – 23 September 1983

=== Stations ===
- Smoky Hill Army Air Field, Kansas, 22 December 1942
- Topeka Army Air Field, Kansas, 31 May 1943
- Merced Army Air Field (later Castle Field), California, 7 October 1945 – 3 April 1946
- Memphis Municipal Airport, Tennessee, 20 December 1946 – 27 June 1949
- Forbes Air Force Base, Kansas, 16 February 1951 – 1 September 1964
- McGuire Air Force Base, New Jersey, 1 April 1966 – 31 December 1967
- Hancock Field, New York 19 November 1969
- Griffiss Air Force Base, New York, 31 August – 23 September 1983

=== Components ===
==== World War II ====
- 48th Staging Wing: 18 July 1945 – c. 21 March 1946
- 95th Bombardment Group: 29 May 1947 – 27 June 1949
- 333d Bombardment Group: attached 15 July 1942 – 21 February 1943
- 346th Bombardment Group: attached 7 September 1942 – 25 February 1943
- 384th Bombardment Group: 16 July 1947 – 27 June 1949

==== Strategic Air Command ====
- 40th Bombardment Wing (later 40 Strategic Aerospace Wing): 20 June 1960 – 1 September 1964
- 44th Bombardment Wing

Lake Charles Air Force Base, Louisiana, 4 August 1951 – 8 April 1952. 8 April – 16 June 1952

- 55th Strategic Reconnaissance Wing: 1 – 16 October 1952; 16 October 1952 – 1 September 1964
- 68th Strategic Reconnaissance Wing

Lake Charles Air Force Base, Louisiana, 10 October 1951 – 8 April 1952. 8 April – c. 15 May 1952

- 90th Bombardment Wing (later 90 Strategic Reconnaissance Wing):14 March 1951 – 8 April 1952. 8 April – 16 October 1952. 16 October 1952 – 20 June 1960.
- 308th Bombardment Wing:10 October 1951 – 8 April 1952; 8 – 17 April 1952
- 310th Bombardment Wing: attached: 28 March – 4 September 1952
- 376th Bombardment Wing:attached: 1 June – 10 October 1951

- 373d Bombardment Squadron: attached 10 October 1951 – 8 April 1952; 8 – 17 April 1952
- 374th Bombardment Squadron: attached 10 October 1951 – 8 April 1952; 8 – 17 April 1952
- 375th Bombardment Squadron: attached 10 October 1951 – 8 April 1952; 8 – 17 April 1952

==== Air Defense Command ====
- Air Forces Iceland: 31 December 1969 – 1 October 1975

===== Fighter-Interceptor units =====
- 52d Fighter Wing

Suffolk County Air Force Base, New York, 1 April 1966 – 1 December 1967

- 551st Airborne Early Warning and Control Wing

Otis Air Force Base, Massachusetts, 4 – 31 December 1969

- 27th Fighter-Interceptor Squadron

Loring Air Force Base, Maine, 19 November 1969 – 1 July 1971

- 49th Fighter-Interceptor Squadron

Griffiss Air Force Base, New York, 19 November 1969 – 23 September 1983

- 60th Fighter-Interceptor Squadron

Otis Air Force Base, Massachusetts, 19 November 1969 – 30 April 1971

- 83d Fighter-Interceptor Squadron

Loring Air Force Base, Maine, 1 July 1971 – 30 June 1972

- 87th Fighter-Interceptor Squadron

K. I. Sawyer Air Force Base, Michigan, 1 August 1981 – 23 September 1983

- 95th Fighter-Interceptor Squadron

Dover Air Force Base, Delaware, 1 April 1966 – 1 December 1967

- 539th Fighter-Interceptor Squadron

McGuire Air Force Base, New Jersey, 1 April 1966 – 31 August 1967

===== Missile units =====
- 26th Air Defense Missile Squadron (BOMARC)

Otis Air Force Base, Massachusetts, 19 November 1969 – 30 April 1972

- 35th Air Defense Missile Squadron (BOMARC)

Niagara Falls Air Force Missile Site, New York, 19 November – 31 December 1969

- 46th Air Defense Missile Squadron (BOMARC)

McGuire Air Force Base, New Jersey, 1 April 1966 – 1 December 1967; 19 November 1969 – 31 October 1972

===== Radar units =====
- 12th Missile Warning Group

Thule Air Base, Greenland, 1 October 1976 – 1 October 1979

- 762d Air Defense Group

North Truro Air Force Station, Massachusetts, 1 March 1970 – 1 January 1974

- 765th Air Defense Group

Charleston Air Force Station, Maine, 1 March 19790 – 1 January 1974

- 6th Missile Warning Squadron

Otis Air Force Base, Massachusetts, 1 October 1978 – 1 October 1979

- 640th Aircraft Control and Warning Squadron

Stephenville Air Station, Newfoundland, Canada, 31 March 1970 – 30 June 1971

- 641st Aircraft Control and Warning Squadron

Melville Air Station, Labrador, Canada, 31 March 1970 – 30 June 1971

- 648th Radar Squadron

Highlands Air Force Station, New Jersey, 1 April – 1 July 1966

- 648th Radar Squadron

Benton Air Force Station, Pennsylvania, 19 November 1969 – 30 June 1975

- 655th Radar Squadron

Watertown Air Force Station, New York, 19 November 1969 – 8 December 1978

- 656th Radar Squadron

Saratoga Springs Air Force Station, 19 November 1969 – 30 June 1977

- 680th Radar Squadron

Palermo Air Force Station, New Jersey, 19 November 1969 – 30 May 1970

- 763d Radar Squadron

Lockport Air Force Station, New York, 19 November 1969 – 8 December 1978

- 764th Radar Squadron

Saint Albans Air Force Station, Vermont, 19 November 1969 – 8 December 1978

- 765th Radar Squadron

Charleston Air Force Station, Maine, 19 November 1969 – 8 December 1978

- 766th Radar Squadron

Caswell Air Force Station, Maine, 19 November 1969 – 8 December 1978

- 772d Radar Squadron

Gibbsboro Air Force Station, New Jersey, 1 April 1966 – 1 December 1967; 19 November 1969 – 8 December 1978

- 773d Radar Squadron

Montauk Air Force Station, New Jersey, 1 April 1966 – 1 December 1967; 19 November 1969 – 8 December 1978

- 907th Radar Squadron

Bucks Harbor Air Force Station, Maine, 19 November 1969 – 30 June 1979

- 924th Aircraft Control and Warning Squadron

Saglek Air Station, Labrador, Canada, 31 March 1970 – 30 June 1971

===== Air Base units =====
- 4683d Air Base Group

Thule Air Base, Greenland, 31 December 1969 – 31 March 1977

- 4684th Air Base Group

Sondrestrom Air Base, Greenland, 31 December 1969 – 1 December 1979

== Emblem ==
The Division's emblem consists of a Shield divided by a diagonal line from the upper right to middle left, light blue and white, a sword slanting from upper left to lower right, the point to lower right base, the hilt and pommel yellow encircled with five stars, yellow, the lower blade of the sword over a branch of olive in base green. (Approved 17 July 1952)

== See also ==
- List of United States Air Force Aerospace Defense Command Interceptor Squadrons
- List of United States Air Force air divisions
- United States general surveillance radar stations
