= 34th Air Division =

34th Air Division

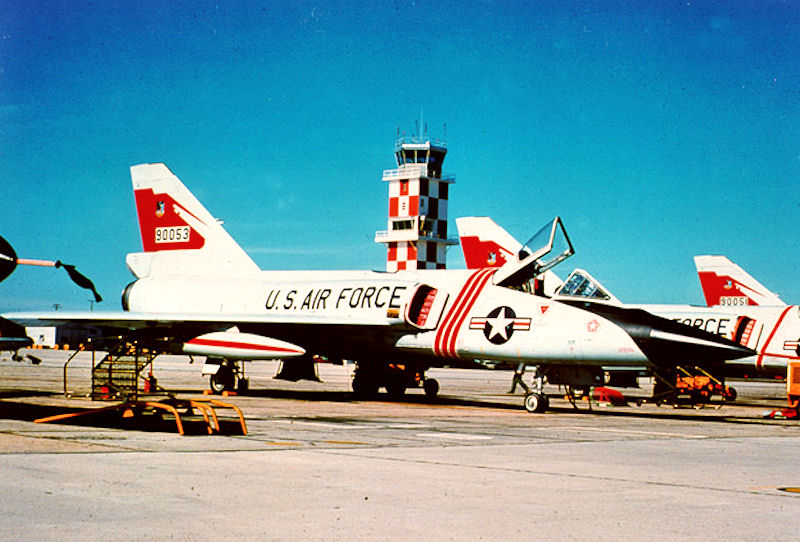
- F-106 of the 87th Fighter-Interceptor Squadron
- Active: 1951–1960; 1966–1969
- Country: United States
- Branch: United States Air Force
- Role: Command of air defense forces
- Part of: Air Defense Command

Insignia
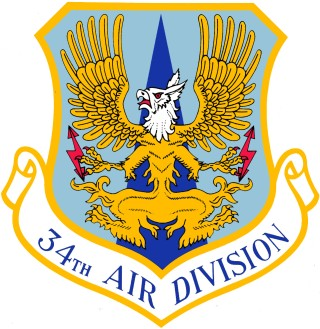
- 34th Air Division emblem (Approved 28 October 1966)

The 34th Air Division (34th AD) is an inactive United States Air Force organization. Its last assignment was with Air Defense Command at Custer Air Force Station, Michigan. It was inactivated on 31 December 1969.

== History ==
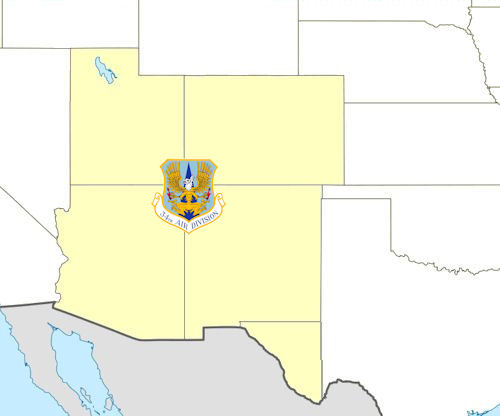
34th Air Division ADC AOR 1951–1960

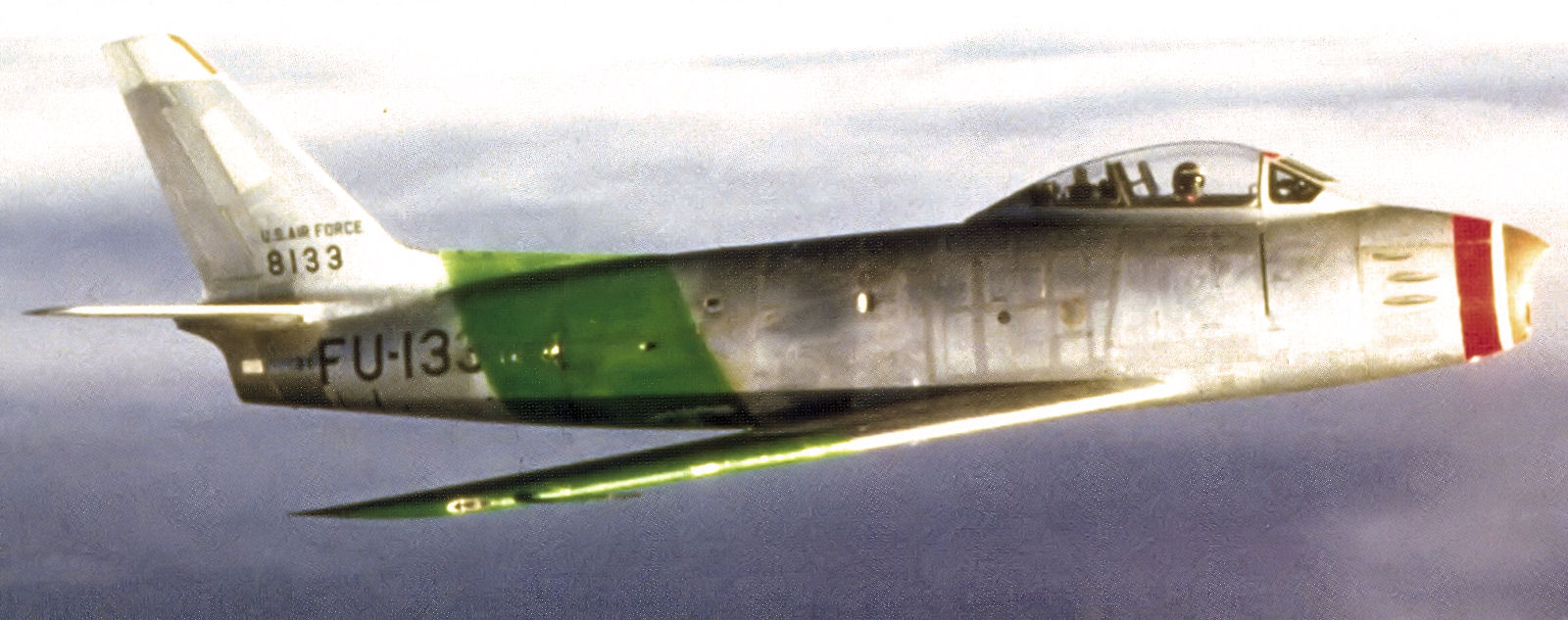
93d Fighter-Interceptor Squadron F-86A

Assigned to Air Defense Command (ADC) for most of its existence, "from January 1951 until 1960 the 34th administered, trained, operated and supported assigned units, and placed all available combat capable elements in a maximum state of readiness. Initially, its area of responsibility included Arizona, New Mexico, and parts of Nevada, Utah, Colorado, and Texas." It was inactivated and its mission, personnel and equipment were transferred to the Albuquerque Air Defense Sector on 1 January 1960.

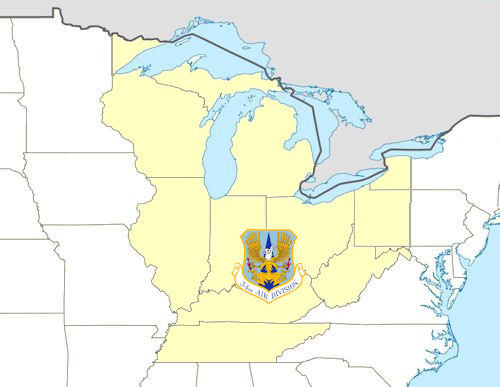
34th Air Division ADC AOR 1966–1969

Reactivated on 1 April 1966, to perform Air Defense "including all or part of Michigan, Indiana, Ohio, New York, Pennsylvania, West Virginia, Kentucky, Tennessee, and Virginia" assuming responsibility for the missions of the Detroit and parts of the Syracuse Air Defense Sectors.

Assumed additional designation of 34th NORAD Region after activation of the NORAD Combat Operations Center at the Cheyenne Mountain Complex, Colorado and reporting was transferred to NORAD from ADC at Ent Air Force Base in April 1966. The division participated in numerous live and simulated exercises such as Fainting Echo, Apache Arrow, and Fainting Knife.

Inactivated in December 1969 as ADC phased down its interceptor mission as the chances of a Soviet bomber attack on the United States seemed remote, its mission being consolidated into North American Aerospace Defense Command (NORAD).

== Lineage ==
- Established as the 34 Air Division (Defense) on 1 January 1951

Activated on 5 January 1951
Inactivated on 1 February 1952

- Organized on 1 February 1952

Inactivated on 1 January 1960

- Redesignated 34 Air Division and activated on 20 January 1966

Organized on 1 April 1966
Inactivated on 31 December 1969

=== Assignments ===
- Western Air Defense Force, 5 January 1951 – 1 February 1952
- Central Air Defense Force, 16 February 1953 – 1 January 1960
- Air Defense Command, 20 January 1966
- First Air Force, 1 April 1966 – 31 December 1969.

=== Stations ===
- Kirtland Air Force Base, New Mexico, 5 January 1951 – 1 January 1960
- Custer Air Force Station, Michigan, 1 April 1966 – 31 December 1969

=== Components ===
==== Wing ====
- 1st Fighter Wing (Air Defense)

Selfridge Air Force Base, Michigan, 1 April 1966 – 1 December 1969

==== Group ====
- 343d Fighter Group (Air Defense)

Duluth MAP, Minnesota, 15 September-14 November 1969

==== Interceptor squadrons ====
- 15th Fighter-Interceptor Squadron: 20 April 1953 – 1 January 1960

Davis–Monthan Air Force Base, Arizona

- 58th Fighter-Interceptor Squadron: 1 August 1959 – 1 January 1960

Walker Air Force Base, New Mexico

- 62d Fighter-Interceptor Squadron: 15 September – 14 November 1969

K.I. Sawyer Air Force Base, Michigan

- 75th Fighter-Interceptor Squadron: 30 September 1968 – 30 November 1969

Wurtsmith Air Force Base, Michigan

- 87th Fighter-Interceptor Squadron: 1 April 1966 – 30 September 1968

Duluth MAP. Minnesota

- 93d Fighter-Interceptor Squadron:

Attached 10 August 1951 – 1 February 1952; 1–5 February 1952
Assigned 6 February 1952 – 1 January 1960
Kirtland Air Force Base, New Mexico

- 445th Fighter-Interceptor Squadron: 1 April 1966 – 30 September 1968

Wurtsmith Air Force Base, Michigan

==== Missile squadron ====
- 35th Air Defense Missile Squadron (BOMARC)

Niagara Falls Air Force Missile Site, 15 September-19 November 1969

==== Radar squadrons ====
- 612th Aircraft Control and Warning Squadron

Ajo Air Force Station, Arizona, 1 January 1958 – 1 January 1960

- 661st Radar Squadron

Selfridge Air Force Base, Michigan, 1 April 1966 – 14 November 1969

- 662d Radar Squadron

Brookfield Air Force Station, Ohio, 1 April 1966 – 30 September 1969

- 664th Radar Squadron

Bellefontaine Air Force Station, Ohio, 1 April 1966 – 30 September 1969

- 674th Aircraft Control and Warning Squadron

Osceola Air Force Station, Wisconsin, 15 September-14 November 1969

- 676th Aircraft Control and Warning Squadron

Antigo Air Force Station, Wisconsin, 1 July 1968 – 14 November 1969

- 684th Aircraft Control and Radar Squadron

Mount Lemmon Air Force Station, Arizona, 1 April 1956 – 1 January 1960

- 685th Aircraft Control and Warning Squadron

Las Cruces Air Force Station, New Mexico, 1 January 1954 – 1 January 1960

- 686th Aircraft Control and Warning Squadron

Walker Air Force Base, New Mexico, 1 October 1953 – 1 January 1960

- 687th Aircraft Control and Warning Squadron

West Mesa Air Force Station, New Mexico, 1 April 1954 – 1 January 1960

- 697th Aircraft Control and Warning Squadron

Pyote Air Force Station, Texas, 8 December 1956 – 1 January 1960

- 739th Radar Squadron

Wadena Air Force Station, Minnesota, 15 September-14 November 1969

- 752d Radar Squadron

Empire Air Force Station, Michigan, 1 April-14 November 1966

- 753d Radar Squadron

Sault Sainte Marie Air Force Station, Michigan, 15 September-14 November 1969

- 754th Radar Squadron

Port Austin Air Force Station, Michigan, 1 April 1966 – 14 November 1969

- 755th Radar Squadron

Arlington Heights Air Force Station, Illinois, 1 July 1968 – 30 September 1969

- 756th Radar Squadron

Finland Air Force Station, Minnesota, 15 September-19 November 1969

- 763d Radar Squadron

Lockport Air Force Station, New York, 1 April 1966 – 15 September 1969

- 767th Aircraft Control and Warning Squadron

Tierra Amarilla Air Force Station, New Mexico, 1 May 1951 – 8 February 1959

- 768th Aircraft Control and Warning Squadron

Moriarty Air Force Station, New Mexico, 1 May 1951 – 1 January 1960

- 769th Aircraft Control and Warning Squadron

Continental Divide Air Force Station, New Mexico, 1 May 1951 – 1 January 1960

- 783d Radar Squadron

Guthrie Air Force Station, West Virginia, 1 April 1966 – 18 June 1968

- 784th Radar Squadron

Snow Mountain Air Force Station, Kentucky, 1 April 1966 – 18 June 1968

- 904th Aircraft Warning and Control Squadron

Winslow Air Force Station, Arizona, 1 April 1955 – 1 January 1960

== See also ==
- List of United States Air Force Aerospace Defense Command Interceptor Squadrons
- List of United States Air Force air divisions
- United States general surveillance radar stations
