= 644th Radar Squadron =

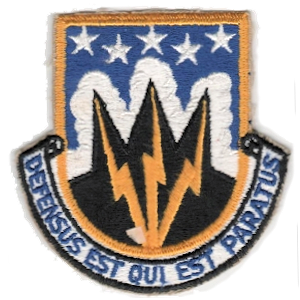
- Emblem of the 644th Radar Squadron
- Active: 1954-1978
- Country: United States
- Branch: United States Air Force
- Type: General Radar Surveillance

The 644th Radar Squadron is an inactive United States Air Force unit. It was last assigned to the 20th Air Division, Aerospace Defense Command, stationed at Richmond Air Force Station, Florida. It was inactivated on 1 April 1978.

The unit was a General Surveillance Radar squadron providing for the air defense of the United States.

Lineage

- Activated as the 644th Aircraft Control and Warning Squadron, 1 October 1954

Inactivated on 1 October 1957
Redesignated 644th Radar Squadron (SAGE)
Activated 25 April 1960
Redesignated 644th Radar Squadron, 1 February 1974
Inactivated on 1 April 1978

Assignments

- 4707th Air Defense Wing, 1 October 1954
- 4622d Air Defense Wing, 18 October 1956
- Boston Air Defense Sector, 8 January 1957
- Montgomery Air Defense Sector, 25 April 1960
- 32d Air Division, 1 April 1966
- 33d Air Division, 14 November 1969
- 20th Air Division, 19 November 1969 – 1 April 1978

Stations

- Syracuse AFS*, New York, 1 October 1954
- Portsmouth AFS, New Hampshire (renamed Rye AFS, New Hampshire, 1 July 1956), 1 July 1955 - 1 October 1957
- Richmond AFS, Florida, 26 April 1960 – 1 April 1978

.* Not manned or equipped
