= 686th Aircraft Control and Warning Squadron =

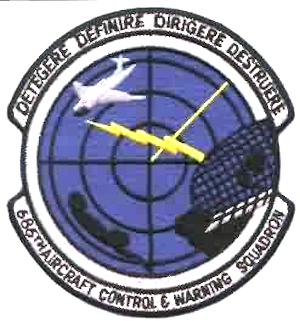
- Emblem of the 686th Aircraft Control and Warning Squadron
- Active: 1953–1963
- Country: United States
- Branch: United States Air Force
- Type: General Radar Surveillance

The 686th Aircraft Control and Warning Squadron is an inactive United States Air Force unit. It was last assigned to the Oklahoma City Air Defense Sector, Aerospace Defense Command, stationed at Walker Air Force Base, New Mexico. It was inactivated on 1 August 1963.

The unit was a General Surveillance Radar squadron providing for the air defense of the United States.

== Lineage ==
- Established as the 686th Aircraft Control and Warning Squadron

Activated on 1 October 1953
Discontinued and inactivated on 1 August 1963

== Assignments ==
- 34th Air Division, 1 October 1953
- Albuquerque Air Defense Sector, 1 January 1960
- Oklahoma City Air Defense Sector, 15 September 1960
- 4752d Air Defense Wing, 1 September 1961
- Oklahoma City Air Defense Sector, 25 June – 1 August 1963

== Stations ==
- Walker AFB, New Mexico, 1 October 1953 – 1 August 1963
