= 540th Aircraft Control and Warning Group =

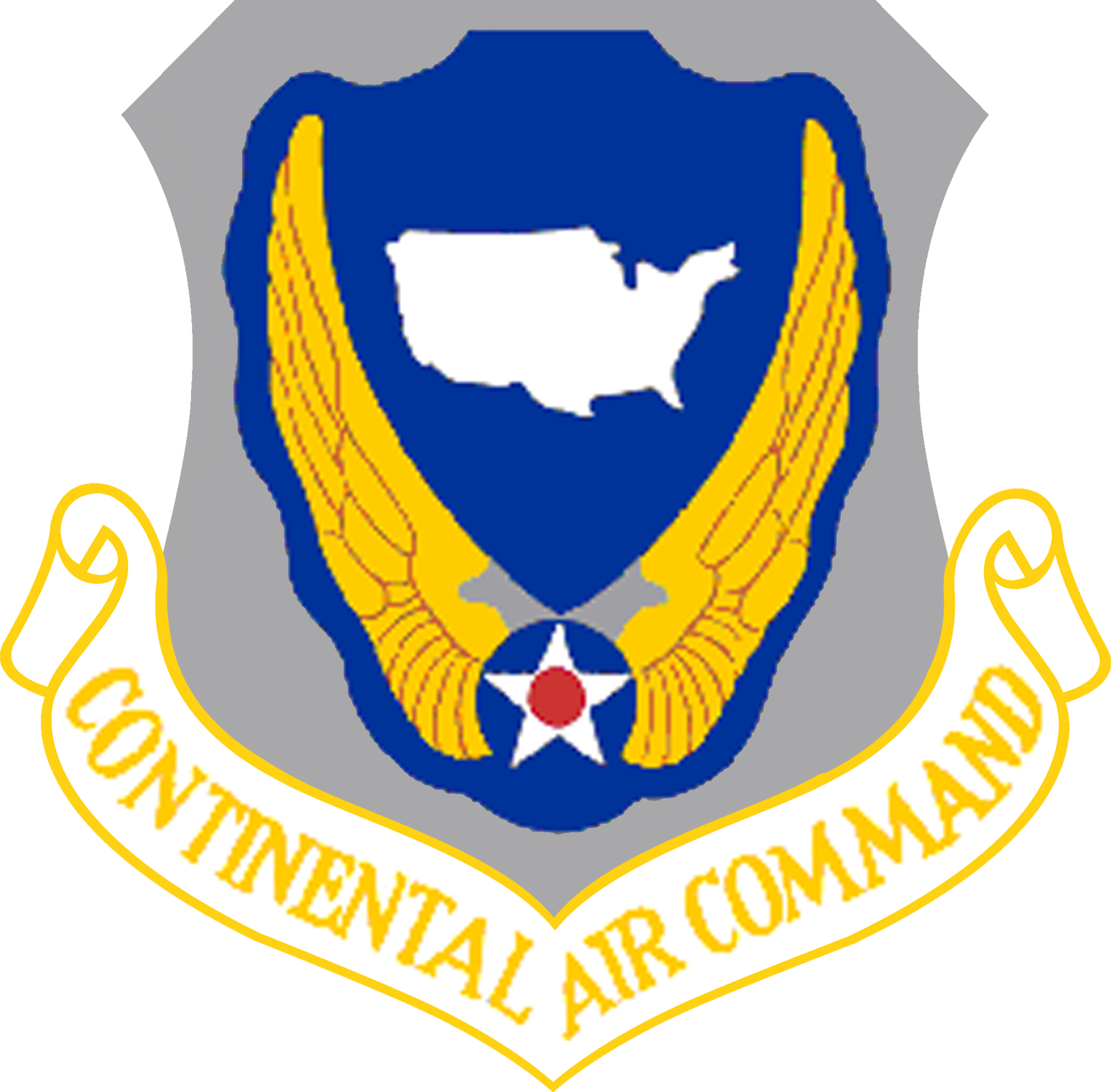
540th Aircraft Control and Warning Group
- Active: 1951-1952
- Country: United States
- Branch: United States Air Force
- Type: Command and Control
- Part of: Air Defense Command

The 540th Aircraft Control and Warning Group is an inactive United States Air Force unit. It was assigned to the 32d Air Division, stationed at Stewart Air Force Base, New York. It was inactivated on 6 February 1952.

This command and control organization activated on 16 February 1953, and was responsible for the organization, manning and equipping of new Aircraft Control and Warning (Radar) units. It was dissolved after about a year, with the units being assigned directly to the 32d AD.

== Components ==
- 653d Aircraft Control and Warning Squadron

Stewart AFB, New York, 1 March 1950 – 6 February 1952

- 654th Aircraft Control and Warning Squadron

Brunswick AFS, Maine, 1 January 1951 – 6 February 1952

- 655th Aircraft Control and Warning Squadron

Watertown AFS, New York, 1 June 1950 – 6 February 1952

- 656th Aircraft Control and Warning Squadron

Saratoga Springs AFS, New York, 1 January 1951 – 6 February 1952

- 657th Aircraft Control and Warning Squadron

Fort Williams, Maine, 1 January – 1 October 1951

- 690th Aircraft Control and Warning Squadron

Kirtland AFB, New Mexico, 1 May 1951 – 6 February 1952 (not manned or equipped)

- 762d Aircraft Control and Warning Squadron

North Truro AFS, Massachusetts, 1 January 1951 – 6 February 1952

- 763d Aircraft Control and Warning Squadron

Lockport AFS, New York, 1 September 1951 – 6 February 1952

- 764th Aircraft Control and Warning Squadron

Saint Albans AFS, Vermont, 1 September 1951 – 6 February 1952

- 765th Aircraft Control and Warning Squadron

Charleston AFS, Maine, 1 January 1951 – 6 February 1952

- 766th Aircraft Control and Warning Squadron

Caswell AFS, Maine, 1–6 February 1952

- 767th Aircraft Control and Warning Squadron

Tierra Amarilla AFS, New Mexico, 1 January – 1 May 1951

- 768th Aircraft Control and Warning Squadron

Moriarty AFS, New Mexico, 1 January – 1 May 1951

- 769th Aircraft Control and Warning Squadron

Continental Divide AFS, New Mexico, 1 January – 1 May 1951

== See also ==
- List of United States Air Force aircraft control and warning squadrons
