= 683d Aircraft Control and Warning Squadron =

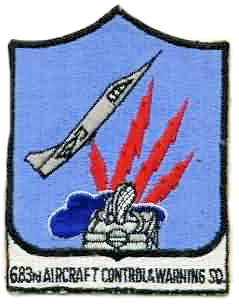
- Emblem of the 683d Aircraft Control and Warning Squadron
- Active: 1953-1969
- Country: United States
- Branch: United States Air Force
- Type: General Radar Surveillance

The 683d Aircraft Control and Warning Squadron is an inactive United States Air Force unit. It was last assigned to the 31st Air Division, Aerospace Defense Command, stationed at Sweetwater Air Force Station, Texas. It was inactivated on 30 September 1969.

The unit was a General Surveillance Radar squadron providing for the air defense of the United States.

== Lineage ==
- Established as 683d Aircraft Control and Warning Squadron

Activated on 1 December 1953
Inactivated on 30 September 1969

== Assignments ==
- 4702d Defense Wing, 1 December 1953
- 33d Air Division, 1 January 1954
- Albuquerque Air Defense Sector, 1 January 1960
- Oklahoma City Air Defense Sector, 15 September 1960
- 4752d Air Defense Wing, 1 September 1961
- Oklahoma City Air Defense Sector, 25 June 1963
- 31st Air Division, 1 April 1966 - 30 September 1969

== Stations ==
- Geiger Field, Washington, 1 December 1953
- Tinker AFB, Oklahoma, 1 January 1954
- Sweetwater AFS, Texas, 1 March 1956 - 30 September 1969
