= AN/FPS-27 =

Cold War-era US military early warning radar

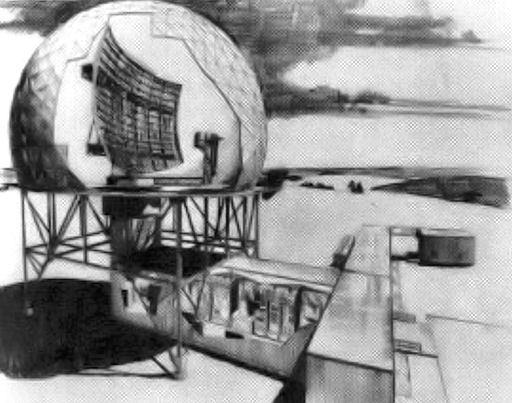
- Westinghouse AN/FPS-27 Radar
- Country of origin: United States
- Manufacturer: Westinghouse Electric
- Introduced: 1963
- Type: Surveillance and height finding
- Frequency: 2.322 to 2.670 GHz (12.91 to 11.23 cm); S-band
- PRF: selectable between 226 and 288
- Pulsewidth: 6.5 μs
- RPM: 5 RPM
- Range: 220 nmi (410 km; 250 mi)
- Altitude: 150,000 ft (46,000 m)
- Power: Peak: 15 MW; Average: 30 kW

The AN/FPS-27 Radar was a long-range 3D early warning radar used by the United States Air Force Air Defense Command. Manufactured by Westinghouse Electric Corporation using frequency diverse (FD) electronics, the search radar operated in the S-band from 2,322 to 2,670 MHz (12.91 to 11.23 cm). It was designed for a maximum range of 220 nmi (410 km; 250 mi) and up to an altitude of 150,000 ft (46 km).

System problems during testing at the test platform located at Crystal Springs, Mississippi required several modifications. Once these problems were solved, the first of twenty units in the continental United States became operational at Charleston, Maine, in 1963. The last unit was installed at Bellefontaine, Ohio, a year later. All FPS-27 radars were installed at sites which had AN/FPS-6, AN/FPS-26, or AN/FPS-90 height finder radars. The 3-dimensional data of the FPS-27 was not available to the AN/FYQ-47 Common Digitizer for use in the Semi-Automatic Ground Environment (SAGE) system. The 3-D functionality was made possible through the use of a "vertically stacked beam", where one transmission beam was above another, using a radiating feedhorn into the parabolic reflector. The received radar return was detected in a single or adjacent feedhorn which the radar receiver used to calculate a relative position in elevation.

By the early 1970s, FPS-27 radar stations that had not been shut down received a modification involving solid state receiver circuitry replacing vacuum tubes improving reliability and maintenance costs. The upgraded radars were designated AN/FPS-27A.

In accordance with the Joint Electronics Type Designation System (JETDS), the "AN/FPS-27" designation represents the 27th design of an Army-Navy electronic device for fixed ground search radar. The JETDS system also now is used to name all Department of Defense electronic systems.

== See also ==
- List of radars
- List of military electronics of the United States
