= AN/FPS-5 Radar =

AN/FPS-5
- Country of origin: United States
- Type: Long range search radar

The AN/FPS-5 was a nodding height-finding radar used by the United States Air Force Air Defense Command. It was unique in that it used a fixed reflector and a moving feed in order to steer the beam. It was produced in the early 1950s by Hazeltine, and deployment was limited. It was normally used with the AN/FPS-3 search radar.

In accordance with the Joint Electronics Type Designation System (JETDS), the "AN/FPS-5" designation represents the 5th design of an Army-Navy electronic device for fixed ground search radar. The JETDS system also now is used to name all Department of Defense electronic systems.

== See also ==
- List of radars
- List of military electronics of the United States
