= AN/FPS-14 Radar =

AN/FPS-14
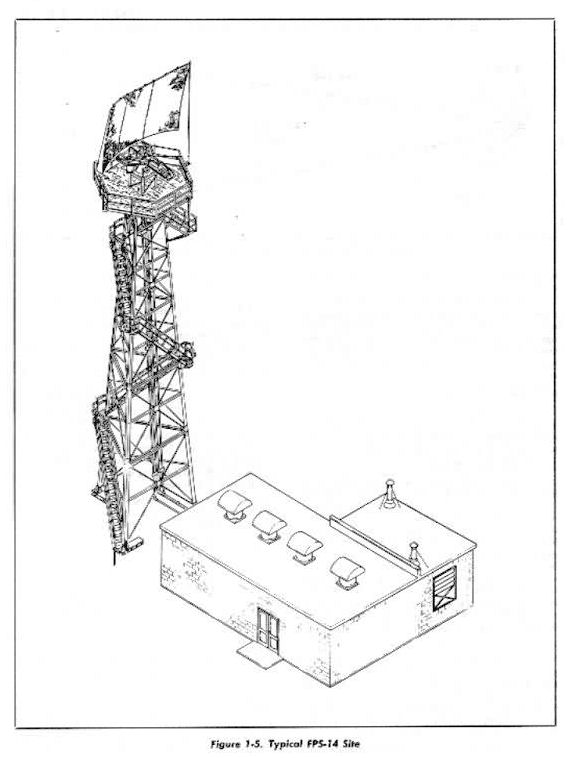
- Bendix AN/FPS-14 Radar "Gap Filler" site
- Country of origin: United States
- Type: Medium-range search radar

The AN/FPS-14 was a medium-range search Radar used by the United States Air Force Air Defense Command.

This medium-range search radar was designed and built by Bendix as a SAGE system gap-filler radar to provide low-altitude coverage. Operating in the S-band at a frequency between 2700 and 2900 MHz, the AN/FPS-14 could detect at a range of 65 miles.

The system was deployed in the late 1950s and 1960s at unmanned radar facilities (called "Gap Fillers") designed to fill the low-altitude gaps between manned long-range radar stations. Gaps in coverage existed due to the curvature of the Earth, mountains, hills, valleys, rivers, and so forth.

The typical unmanned gap-filler radar annex consisted of a small L-shaped cinder-block building, with the radar equipment and the data-transmission equipment in one section and one or more diesel generators in the other section. These unmanned gap-filler sites generally had a three-legged radar tower about 85 feet tall where the AN/FPS-14 Radar was mounted inside a radome.

In accordance with the Joint Electronics Type Designation System (JETDS), the "AN/FPS-14" designation represents the 14th design of an Army-Navy electronic device for fixed ground search radar. The JETDS system also now is used to name all Department of Defense electronic systems.

== See also ==
- Saugatuck Gap Filler Radar Annex
- List of radars
- List of military electronics of the United States
