= Bangor Air Defense Sector =

Inactive United States Air Force unit

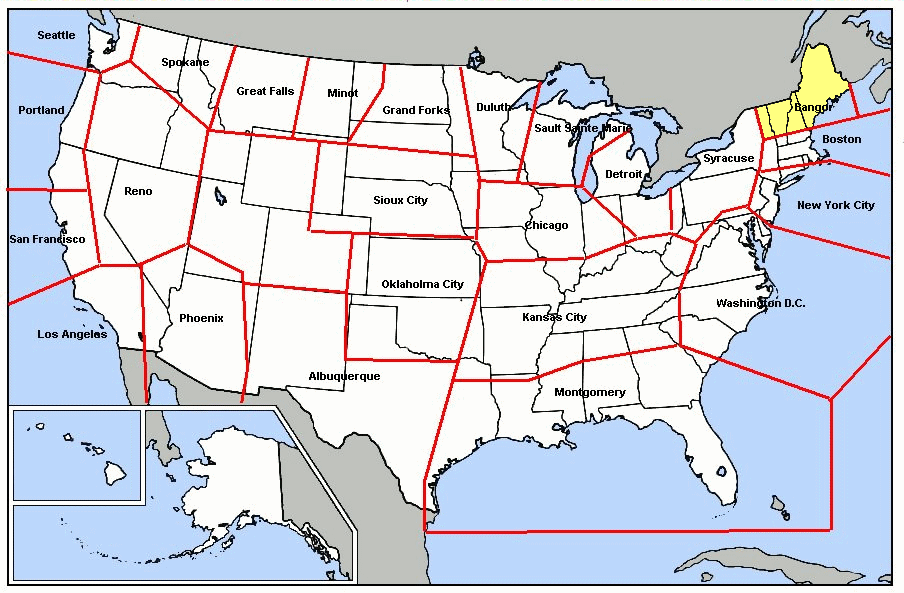
- 1958 Bangor Air Defense Sector Area of Responsibility
- Active: 1958–1966
- Country: United States
- Branch: United States Air Force
- Role: Air defense

Commanders
- Notable commanders: Edwin A. Doss

Insignia
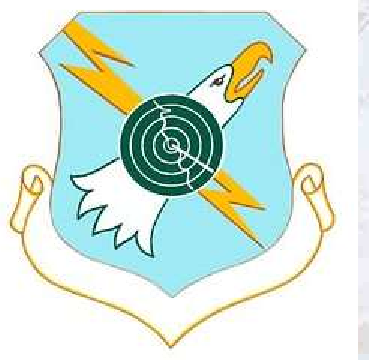
- Bangor Air Defense Sector emblem (Note: Approved 25 July 1958. Description: Azure, saltirewise, an eagle’s head erased Argent, eye Gules, beak Or and issuant from sinister chief a lightning flash of the last [color mentioned], all surmounted by a radarscope Vert with markings of the second [color mentioned]. Significance: The emblem is symbolic of the fundamentals of the sector's air defense mission. The radarscope represents detection, the eagle’s eye symbolizes identification, the eagle indicates interception, and the bolt of lightning represents destruction.)

The Bangor Air Defense Sector is an inactive United States Air Force organization. Its last assignment was with 26th Air Division at Topsham Air Force Station, Maine, where it was inactivated on 1 April 1966. From 1958 through 1966, the sector controlled air defense fighter, missile and radar units in Maine and northern Vermont and New Hampshire. (Note: The sector's initial area of responsibility included parts of New York, but no units under the sector's control were stationed there.) From 1958 to 1960, it also controlled a radar unit in Canada.

== History ==
The Bangor Air Defense Sector was organized in January 1957 at Topsham Air Force Station, Maine and assigned to the 32nd Air Division, located at Syracuse Air Force Station, New York. However, it was not initially assigned any operational units.

On 15 August 1958, the 32nd Air Division was inactivated and replaced by the 26th Air Division, and the sector was reassigned to the 26th. At the same time, the sector assumed command of air defense units in its area of responsibility that had been assigned directly to 32nd Air Division. These units provided air defense of Maine and most of Vermont and New Hampshire, as well as small parts of New York and Nova Scotia. The fighter squadrons assigned to its 14th and 23rd Fighter Groups flew Convair F-102 Delta Daggers and McDonnell F-101 Voodoos. The active duty fighter units were augmented by Air National Guard units of the 101st Air Defense Wing located at Dow Air Force Base, Maine; Grenier Field, New Hampshire, and Ethan Allen Air Force Base, Vermont. These squadrons operated the Northrop F-89 Scorpion and North American F-86 Sabre, with one squadron later upgrading to the F-102.

On 1 March 1959 the sector's new Semi Automatic Ground Environment (SAGE) direction center (DC-05) became operational. DC-05 was equipped with dual AN/FSQ-7 Computers. As the sector's aircraft control and warning squadrons entered the SAGE system that year, their controllers were centralized in the sector direction center and the squadrons were redesignated radar squadrons. The sector's 672d Aircraft Control and Warning Squadron at Barrington Air Station in Canada did not convert, but was transferred to Boston Air Defense Sector the following year. In addition to its assigned units, the sector's direction center also controlled Army air defense systems, interfacing with the Army's AN/FSG-1 Missile Master control system.

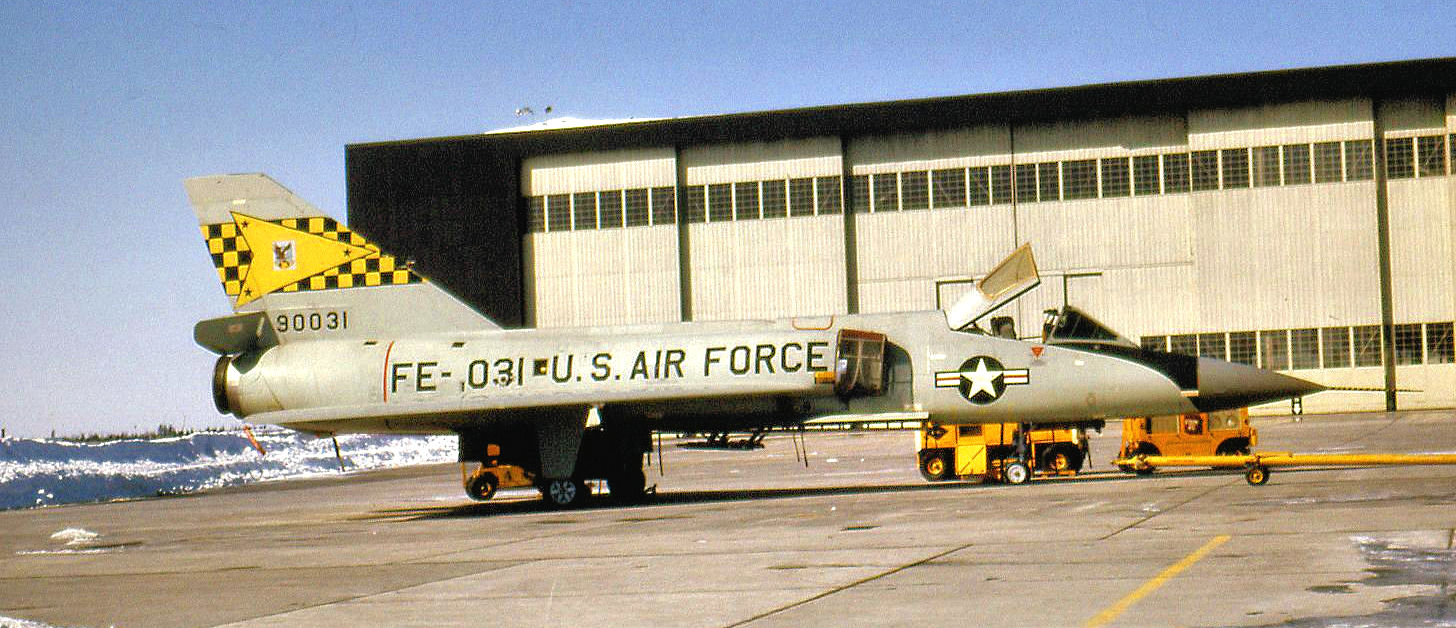
27th Fighter-Interceptor Squadron Convair F-106 (Note: Aircraft is Convair F-106-110-CO Delta Dart, serial 59-0031. It was sent to the Aerospace Maintenance and Regeneration Center on 13 November 1992 and later converted to a QF-106 drone. It was shot down by an AIM-7 on 17 January 1996. Dirkx, Marco (11 June 2023). "1959 USAF Serial Numbers". Joe Baugher’s Serial Number List.)

The sector added a surface to air missile unit in June 1959, when the 30th Air Defense Missile Squadron was activated at Dow Air Force Base, Maine, although the squadron would not be operational until the following year. The following month, the 23rd Fighter Group was inactivated when Presque Isle Air Force Base, Maine was transferred from Air Defense Command (ADC) to Strategic Air Command. However, its 75th Fighter-Interceptor Squadron moved to Dow, and was assigned directly to the sector. In October, the 27th Fighter-Interceptor Squadron moved to Loring Air Force Base, Maine from Griffiss Air Force Base, New York and was assigned to the sector. Once it arrived at Loring, it began converting to the Convair F-106 Delta Dart.

In 1962, ADC adjusted the sector area of responsibility, which resulted in the transfer of the 654th, 764th, 765th and 911th Radar Squadrons to the Boston Air Defense Sector. This reduced the sector's area of responsibility in the United States to only a portion of Maine. Although the sector remained assigned to the 26th Air Division, it was operationally controlled through the Northern NORAD Region in Canada. (Note: Although the former base of the sector's 672nd Squadron was within this region, it was now operated by the Royal Canadian Air Force.)

In 1964, the Air Force phased the Boeing CIM-10A BOMARC out of the air defense system. (Note: The CIM-10B BOMARC remained in service until 1972.) As a result, the 30th Air Defense Missile Squadron was inactivated on 15 December.

The sector was inactivated 1 April 1966 as part of an ADC reorganization, with its mission, personnel and equipment being reassigned to the 36th Air Division, which was simultaneously activated at Topsham.

=== Lineage ===
- Designated as the Bangor Air Defense Sector and organized on 8 January 1957

Inactivated on 1 April 1966

=== Assignments ===
- 32d Air Division, 8 January 1957
- 26th Air Division, 15 August 1958 – 1 April 1966

=== Stations ===
- Topsham Air Force Station, Maine, 8 January 1957 – 1 April 1966

=== Components ===
==== Groups ====
- 14th Fighter Group, 15 August 1958-25 June 1960

Ethan Allen Air Force Base, Vermont (Note: Location of units is provided for units not located with sector headquarters at Topsham Air Force Station.)

- 23d Fighter Group, 15 August 1958-1 July 1959

Presque Isle Air Force Base, Maine

==== Squadrons ====
Fighter squadrons

- 27th Fighter-Interceptor Squadron, 1 October 1959-1 April 1966

Loring Air Force Base, Maine

- 75th Fighter-Interceptor Squadron, 1 July 1959-1 April 1966

Dow Air Force Base, Maine

Missile squadron

- 30th Air Defense Missile Squadron, 1 June 1959-15 December 1964

Dow Air Force Base, Maine

Radar squadrons

- 654th Aircraft Control and Warning Squadron (later 654th Radar Squadron (SAGE)), 15 August 1958-1 August 1962

Brunswick Air Force Station (P-13), (Note: P sites became Z sites with the same number after converting to the SAGE system.)Maine

- 672d Aircraft Control and Warning Squadron, 15 August 1958 – 1 July 1960

Barrington Air Station (M-102) (Note: Later C-102.), Nova Scotia, Canada

- 764th Aircraft Control and Warning Squadron (later 764th Radar Squadron (SAGE)), 15 August 1958 – 1 June 1962

Saint Albans Air Force Station (P-14), Vermont

- 765th Aircraft Control and Warning Squadron (later 765th Radar Squadron (SAGE)), 15 August 1958 – 1 August 1962

Charleston Air Force Station (P-65), Maine (Note: This was the first unit in ADC to operate the AN/FPS-27 radar.)

- 766th Aircraft Control and Warning Squadron (later 766th Radar Squadron (SAGE)), 15 August 1958 – 1 April 1966

Caswell Air Force Station (P-80), Maine

- 907th Aircraft Control and Warning Squadron (later 907th Radar Squadron (SAGE)), 15 August 1958 – 1 April 1966

Bucks Harbor Air Force Station] (M-110) (later P-80), Maine

- 911th Aircraft Control and Warning Squadron (later 911th Radar Squadron (SAGE)), 15 August 1958 – 1 August 1962

North Concord, Vermont (M-103) (later Lyndonville Air Force Station)

Support squadrons

- 4626th Air Base Squadron, 8 January 1957 – 1 April 1966
- 4626th Support Squadron, SAGE 15 July 1959 – 1 April 1966

== See also ==
- List of USAF Aerospace Defense Command General Surveillance Radar Stations
- Aerospace Defense Command Fighter Squadrons
- List of United States Air Force aircraft control and warning squadrons
- List of United States Air Force radar squadrons
