= Caswell Air Force Station =

Former Air Force radar station

- Near Limestone, Maine in the United States

Site information
- Type: US Air Force station
- Code: P-80 (ADC); Z-80 (NORAD)
- Owner: Department of Defense
- Operator: US Air Force
- Controlled by: Aerospace Defense Command
- Condition: Closed
- Function: General surveillance radar station

Location
- Location within Maine Location within the United States
- Coordinates: 46°58′15″N 067°50′04″W

Site history
- Built: 1951
- In use: 1951–1980
- Fate: Realigned to the Maine National Guard as a training site

Garrison information
- Occupants: 766th Aircraft Control and Warning (later Radar) Squadron

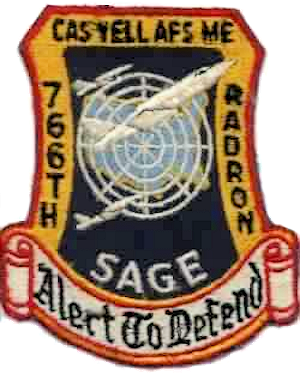
Emblem of the 766th Radar Squadron

Caswell Air Force Station is a closed United States Air Force General Surveillance Radar station. It is located 4.3 miles (6.9 km) north of Limestone, Maine. It was closed in 1980.

== History ==
Caswell was one of twenty-eight stations built as part of the second segment of the permanent Air Defense Command network. Prompted by the start of the Korean War, on 11 July 1950, the Secretary of the Air Force asked the Secretary of Defense for approval to expedite construction of the second segment of the permanent network. Receiving the Defense Secretary's approval on 21 July, the Air Force directed the Corps of Engineers to proceed with construction.

Because of difficulties with new production radar equipment, the site initially consisted of a pair of AN/FPS-10 radars from a closing Lashup site at Limestone AFB, Maine (L-50) to expedite operational status. During 1951 the 766th Aircraft Control and Warning Squadron was moved from the temporary site at Limestone AFB to Caswell and assumed coverage, and initially the station functioned as a Ground-Control Intercept (GCI) and warning station. As a GCI station, the squadron's role was to guide interceptor aircraft toward unidentified intruders picked up on the unit's radar scopes. Thus Caswell received the "LP-80" designation.

In 1955 and 1956 an AN/FPS-8/UGPS-3 was installed. The AN/GPS-3 remained in service until 1961. In 1957 and 1958 the AN/FPS-10s were phased out and two AN/FPS-6As arrived. During 1959 Caswell AFS joined the Semi Automatic Ground Environment (SAGE) system, feeding data to DC-05 at Topsham AFS, Maine. After joining, the squadron was redesignated as the 766th Radar Squadron (SAGE) on 1 October 1959. The radar squadron provided information 24/7 to the SAGE Direction Center where it was analyzed to determine range, direction altitude speed and whether or not aircraft were friendly or hostile.

In 1961 an electronic counter-countermeasures (ECCM) capable AN/FPS-7C began search duties. An AN/FPS-26 height finder radar began operation as well. On 31 July 1963, the site was redesignated as NORAD ID Z-80. The facility came under Tactical Air Command jurisdiction in 1979 with the inactivation of Aerospace Defense Command and the activation of ADTAC.

In addition to the main facility, Caswell operated this unmanned AN/FPS-18 Gap Filler site:

- Bridgewater, ME (P-80B) 46°25′15″N 068°01′28″W

Over the years, the equipment at the station was upgraded or modified to improve the efficiency and accuracy of the information gathered by the radars. The 766th Radar Squadron was inactivated on 30 September 1980.

With its closure, Caswell Air Force Station became a Maine National Guard training site. Many USAF buildings are still in use, although some are in deteriorating condition. The FPS-7 and FPS-6 towers still stand along with other operational buildings. The Bridgewater Gap Filler site doubled as a fire-lookout tower. Both the building and radar tower remain today.

== Air Force units and assignments ==
=== Units ===
- Constituted as the 766th Aircraft Control and Warning Squadron on 14 November 1950

Activated at Limestone AFB (L-50), ME on 27 November 1950
Moved to Caswell AFS on 12 Apr 1951
Redesignated 766th Radar Squadron (SAGE) on 1 October 1959
Redesignated 766th Radar Squadron on 1 February 1974
Inactivated on 30 September 1980

=== Assignments ===
- 540th Aircraft Control and Warning Group 12 Apr 1951
- 32d Air Division, 6 February 1952
- 4711th Defense Wing, 15 February 1953
- 32d Air Division, 1 March 1956
- Bangor Air Defense Sector, 15 August 1958
- 36th Air Division, 1 April 1966
- 35th Air Division, 15 September 1969
- 21st Air Division, 19 November 1969 – 30 September 1980

== See also ==
- United States general surveillance radar stations
