= 672d Aircraft Control and Warning Squadron =

Inactive United States Air Force unit

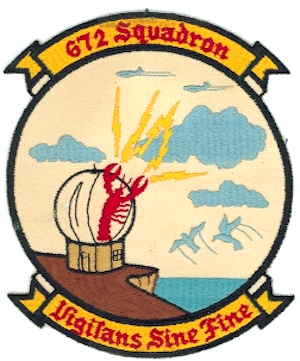
- Emblem of the 672d Aircraft Control and Warning Squadron
- Active: 1949, 1956-1962
- Country: United States
- Branch: United States Air Force
- Type: General Radar Surveillance

The 672d Aircraft Control and Warning Squadron is an inactive United States Air Force unit. It was last assigned to the Boston Air Defense Sector, Air Defense Command, stationed at Barrington Air Force Station, Nova Scotia. It was inactivated on 1 June 1962.

The unit was a General Surveillance Radar squadron providing for the air defense of North America.

== Lineage ==
- Established as 672d Aircraft Control and Warning Squadron

Activated on 28 March 1949
Inactivated on 8 December 1949
Activated on 1 December 1956
Discontinued and inactivated on 1 June 1962

Assignments

- 503d Aircraft Warning and Control Group, 28 March 1949 - 8 December 1949
- 32d Air Division, 1 December 1956
- Bangor Air Defense Sector, 15 August 1958
- Boston Air Defense Sector, 1 July 1960 – 1 June 1962

Stations

- Mitchel AFB, New York, 28 March 1949
- Roslyn AFS, New York, 1 April 1949
- Arlington, Virginia, 10 June 1949
- Gravelly Point, Virginia, 28 July 1949 - 8 December 1949
- Syracuse AFS, New York, 1 December 1956
- Barrington AS, Nova Scotia, 1 June 1957 – 1 June 1962
