= Sherose Island, Nova Scotia =

Sherose Island
- Community
- Location of Sherose Island, Nova Scotia
- Coordinates: 43.5333°N 65.5992°W
- Country: Canada
- Province: Nova Scotia
- County: Shelburne
- Municipal district: Barrington
- Time zone: UTC-4 (AST)
  - Summer (DST): UTC-3 (ADT)
- Area code: 902

Sherose Island is a small island and community of the same name located off the South Shore of Nova Scotia, Canada, within the Barrington municipal district of Shelburne County.

The island is located in Barrington Passage, a small strait in Shelburne County and measures approximately 2 km (1.2 mi) long and 0.5 km (0.3 mi) wide. It is connected to mainland Nova Scotia by a short causeway.

== History ==
The island was home to Acadian families until the expulsion of April 1756. From the 1960s to the late 1980s it was home to families of Royal Canadian Air Force and later Canadian Forces personnel stationed at CFS Barrington, a Pinetree Line early warning radar station located 27 km (17 mi) away at Baccaro. Families of service personnel were housed in 60 by 12 ft (18.3 by 3.7 m) mobile trailers, except for the base Commanding Officer, who had a larger house at the end of the causeway. At its peak, the military housing on Sherose Island contained in excess of 100 families.

The military housing was reduced throughout the 1970s and 1980s as CFS Barrington went into a decline, leaving the concrete pads on which they sat. One can still find concrete pads all over the island where the trailers were once placed. Remains of Acadian cellars may also be seen.

Today, the island has a small civilian population as well as a small wharf and the main municipal recreation facility, the Sherose Island Recreation Centre which includes a curling rink, arena, outdoor pool and ball field. The municipal recreation department is also situated in the facility.

== See also ==
- List of communities in Nova Scotia
