= Ground-to-Air Transmitter Facility =

U.S. military radio uplink station

Ground-to-Air Transmitter Facilities (GAT Facility) were surface-to-air missile radio uplink stations of the United States Air Force.

They were located near CIM-10 Bomarc bases (e.g., Suffolk County Missile Annex on Long Island) for command guidance of the Interceptor Missiles. The unmanned sites with a transmitter building and 2 antenna towers converted the digital "midcourse guidance commands" (after the launch/climb and before the homing dive) received from an AN/FSQ-7 Combat Direction Central into the transmitter building's Digital Data Receivers, processing 28 channels of uplink data.

Processing by the AN/GKA-4A's demultiplexer group prepared the SAGE data for amplitude modulation on separate frequencies for each missile (FDDL: frequency-division data link), e.g., 3 missiles were simultaneously controlled in a 1960 test. An AN/GRT-3 transmitter provided the modulated signals to a UHF Klystron high power amplifier—dual chains of components provided redundancy, including 2 exterior GAT Antennas on GAT Towers from which a missile's "command receiver" demodulated the signal. A single local monitoring cabinet allowed review of either chain's function (e.g., during test input to the dummy load), ventilation provided cooling of the building equipment, and "three 150 KVA diesel driven generators housed in the GAT building" provided power.

For the advanced Bomarc (IM-99B), a Time-Division Data Link was planned for GAT Facilities to provide an electronic counter-countermeasures capability using a "directional hlgh-gain data link antenna…composed of 16 stationary segments in a circular pattern 60 feet high".
