= Aerospace Defense Center =

Coordinates: 33°42′49″N 118°17′16″W

- Active: 1980-1984
- Country: United States
- Garrison/HQ: Peterson Air Force Base

Commanders
- 1979 December 1 - 1986: James E. Hill
- (1980): James V. Hartinger

The Aerospace Defense Center (ADC) was a unit of the United States Air Force. It was under the command of the general that also commanded both North American Aerospace Defense Command and Aerospace Defense Command (ADCOM). The center included the Office of Astrodynamics (ADC/DO6) and the Office of History.

== History ==
The center was formed as Aerospace Defense Command was being disestablished, and its other assets being transferred to Tactical Air Command (1 October 1979) and Strategic Air Command. The Aerospace Defense Center as part of an "ad hoc working group" of personnel from Air Force Systems Command and the Office of the Secretary of the Air Force studied the 1982 proposal for "reorganization of USAF space management practices" by General Robert T. Marsh. Space Command was renamed Air Force Space Command in 1985.

After the Aerospace Defense Center was disestablished, aerospace defense history operations continued by the NORAD and USNORTHCOM Command History Office, and the Air Force Space Command Office of History. The AFSPC command historian has been Mr. George W. Bradley, III since 1992. A "Specialized Historical Document Collection" is in Peterson AFB Building 1470, and the Peterson Air and Space Museum has a library with historical Aerospace Defense documents.
