= AN/FSQ-7 Combat Direction Central =

Cold War-era air defense command and control computer

- Part of Semi-Automatic Ground Environment
- AL: Gunter Annex (DC-09); AZ: Luke Air Force Base (DC-21); CA: Beale Air Force Base (DC-18); CA: Norton Air Force Base (DC-17); ME: Bangor Air National Guard Base (DC-15); MI: Custer Air Force Station (DC-06); MI: K.I. Sawyer AFB (DC-14); MN: Duluth AFB (DC-10); MO: Richards-Gebaur Air Force Base (DC-08); MT: Malmstrom Air Force Base (DC-20); ME: Topsham Air Force Station (BaADS) (DC-05); ND: Grand Forks Air Force Base (DC-11); ND: Minot Air Force Base (DC-19); NJ: McGuire Air Force Base (DC-01); NV: Stead AFB (DC-16); NY: Hancock Field (Syracuse AFS) (DC-03); NY: Stewart Air Force Base (DC-02); ON: CFB North Bay, Ontario (DC-31); OR: Adair Air Force Station (DC-13); VA: Fort Lee Air Force Station (DC-04); WA: McChord Air Force Base (DC-12); WI: Truax Field (DC-07); in United States
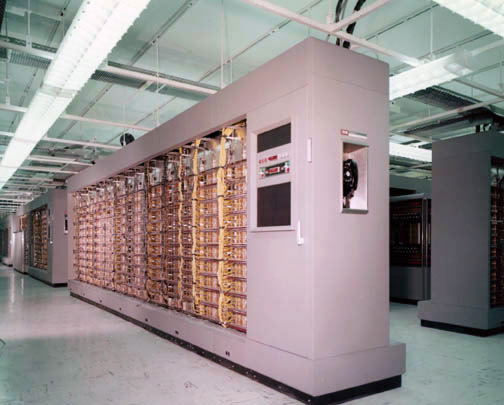
- The AN/FSQ-7 included a Maintenance Intercom System (the phone on end of cabinet).

Site information
- Type: Military command, control and coordination system

AN/FSQ-7
- Also known as: Q7
- Manufacturer: IBM
- Generation: 1
- Released: 1955; 71 years ago
- CPU: 49,000 vacuum tubes @ 75,000 instructions per second
- Power: up to 3 megawatts of electricity
- Weight: 250 tons

The AN/FSQ-7 Combat Direction Central, referred to as the Q7, was a computerized air defense command and control system. It was used by the United States Air Force for ground-controlled interception as part of the Semi-Automatic Ground Environment (SAGE) network during the Cold War.

In accordance with the Joint Electronics Type Designation System (JETDS), the "AN/FSQ-7" designation represents the 7th design of an Army-Navy electronic device for fixed special combination system. The JETDS system also now is used to name all Department of Defense electronic systems.

An advancement of the pioneering MIT Whirlwind II digital computer design, and manufactured by IBM as prime contractor, the AN/FSQ-7 was the largest discrete computer system ever built. Each of the 24 installed machines weighed 250 tons. The AN/FSQ-7 used a total of 60,000 vacuum tubes (49,000 in the computers) and up to 3 megawatts of electricity, performing about 75,000 instructions per second for networking regional radars.

== Primary functions ==
Installations in the USAF Semi-Automatic Ground Environment (SAGE) air defense network were configured as duplex systems, using a pair of AN/FSQ-7 computers to provide fault tolerance. One was active at any time, the other on standby. The standby system copied data from the active system to minimize switchover time if needed. A scheduled switchover took place every day.

The AN/FSQ-7 calculated one or more predicted interception points for assigning crewed aircraft or CIM-10 Bomarc missiles to intercept an intruder using the Automatic Target and Battery Evaluation (ATABE) algorithm. Also used in the Nike AN/FSG-1 system, ATABE automated the Whiz Wheel (Felsenthal CPU-73 A/P Air Navigation Attack Computer) method used in manual command post operations.

The Q7 fire button launched the Bomarc, and an additional Q7 algorithm automatically directed the missile during climb and cruise to the beginning of its supersonic dive on the target when guidance transferred to the missile seeker system for the homing dive.

== History ==
The first United States radar network used voice reporting to the 1939 Twin Lights Station in New Jersey, and the post-World War II experimental Cape Cod System used a Whirlwind I computer at Cambridge, Massachusetts to network long-range and several short-range radars. The key Whirlwind modification for radar netting was the development of magnetic-core memory that vastly improved reliability, doubled operating speed, and quadrupled input speed relative to the original Williams tube memory of the Whirlwind I.

The AN/FSQ-7 was based on the larger and faster (but uncompleted) Whirlwind II design. It proved too much for MIT's resources, resulting in IBM being retained as prime contractor – though the MIT Lincoln Laboratory Division 6 still participated in AN/FSQ-7 development.

Similar to the Q7, the smaller AN/FSQ-8 Combat Control Central was produced without an 'Automatic Initiation Area Discriminator'

A simplex version of the AN/FSQ-7 was located at the premises of the System Development Corporation in Santa Monica, California from 1957 until the premises were vacated some time after 1981.

== Uses ==
=== SAGE ===
The experimental SAGE subsector, located in Lexington, Massachusetts, was completed in 1955, equipped with a prototype AN/FSQ-7 known as XD-1 in Building F. The third evaluation run with the XD-1 was in August and the prototype was complete in October 1955, except for displays.

DC-1 at McGuire Air Force Base was the first operational site of the AN/FSQ-7 with consoles scheduled for delivery in August to October 1956. Groundbreaking at McChord Air Force Base was in 1957 where the "electronic brain" began arriving in November 1958. The Cape Canaveral BOMARC 624-XY1's intercept of a target drone in August 1958 used the Kingston, New York, Q7 1500 miles away. By 1959, the 2000th simulated BOMARC intercept had been completed by the Q7.

The SAGE/Missile Master test program conducted large-scale field testing of the ATABE mathematical model using radar tracks of actual Strategic Air Command and Air Defense Command aircraft conducting mock penetrations into defense sectors (cf. Operation Skyshield). The vacuum-tube SAGE network was completed (and obsolete) in 1963, and a system ergonomic test was performed at Luke Air Force Base in 1964. According to Harold Sackman, it "showed conclusively that the wrong timing of human and technical operations was leading to frequent truncation of the flight path tracking system." Back-Up Interceptor Control Systems (BUIC) were used to replace the AN/FSQ-7s: two remained at SAGE sites until 1983 including McChord AFB, and the Q7 at Luke AFB was demolished in February 1984.

=== Sabre ===
The Sabre airline reservation system used AN/FSQ-7 technology.

=== In popular media ===
Q7 components were used as props in numerous films and television series needing futuristic-looking computers, despite the fact they were built in the 1950s. Q7 components were used in The Time Tunnel, The Towering Inferno, Logan's Run, WarGames, Independence Day, Planet of the Apes TV series (Season 1, Episode 5, "The Legacy" aired October 1974), and many others.

=== Today ===
The Computer History Museum displays several AN/FSQ-7 components.

== Equipment ==
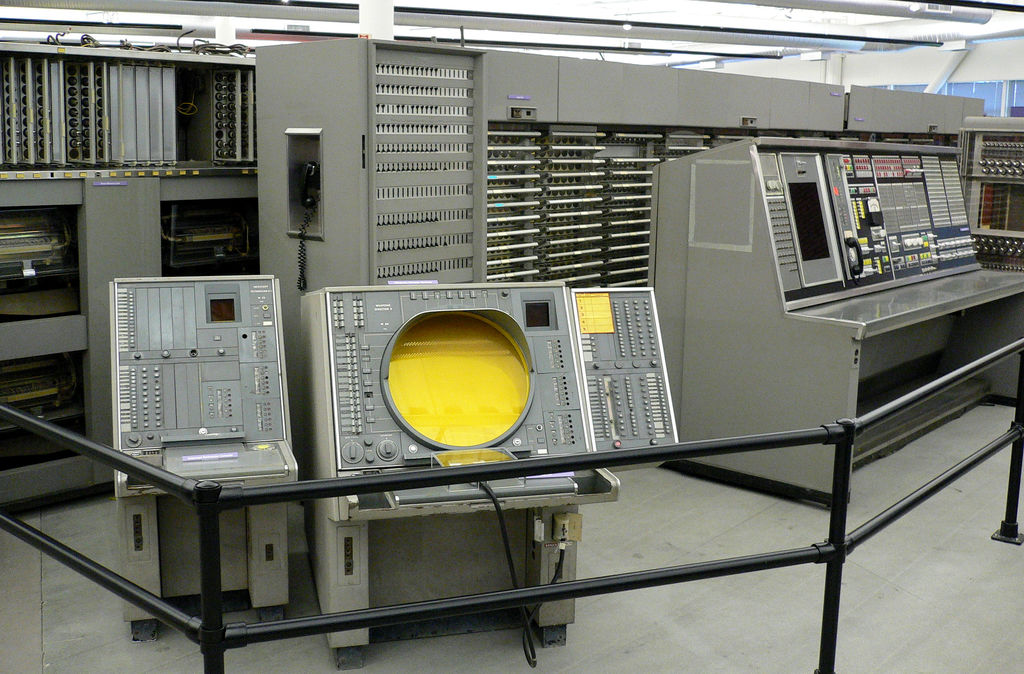
Situation Display console and other parts at Computer History Museum

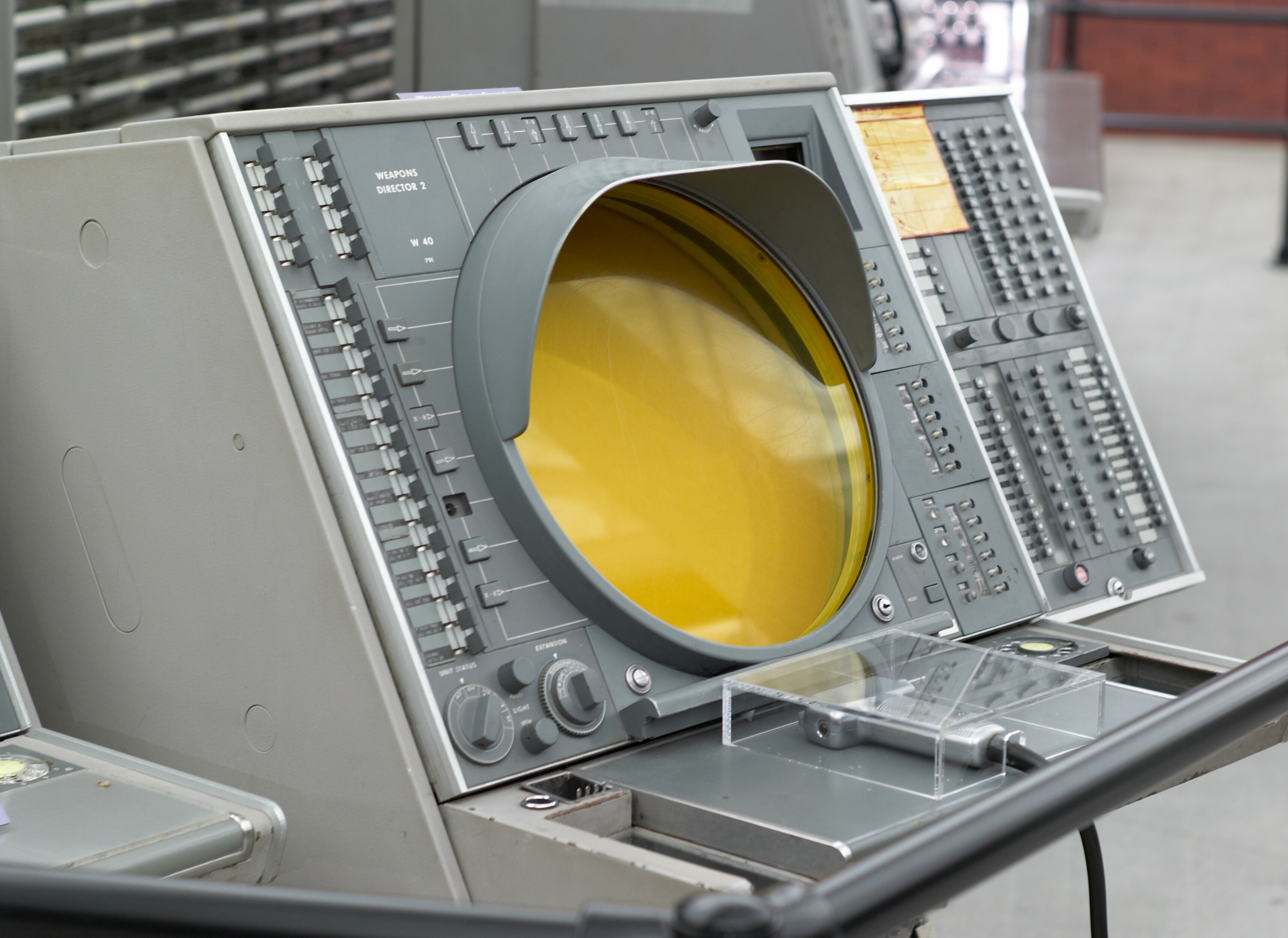
The AN/FSQ-7 had 100 system consoles, including the OA-1008 Situation Display (SD) with a light gun (at end of cable under plastic museum cover), cigarette lighter, and ash tray (left of the light gun).

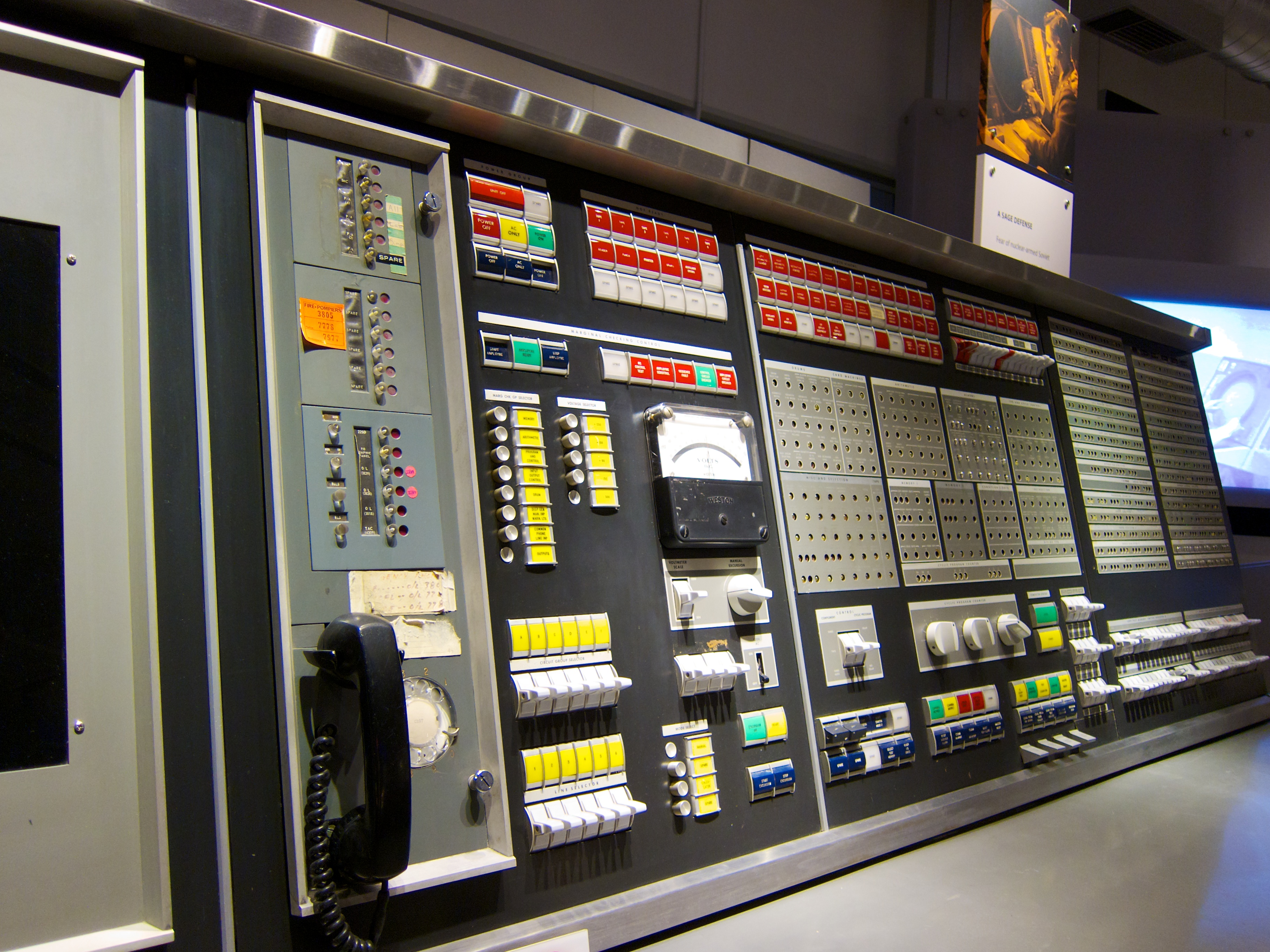
Maintenance Console

MIT selected IBM as the prime contractor for equipment construction. The Central Computer System of the AN/FSQ-7 had two computers for redundancy each with Arithmetic, Core Memory, Instruction Control, Maintenance Control, Selection & IO Control, and Program elements. The Q7 had input/output devices such as:

- IBM 723 card punch and IBM 713 punched card reader
- IBM 718 line printer (64 print positions)
- drum auxiliary memory (50 "fields" of 2048 words each) and IBM 728 magnetic tape drives (32-bit words)
- Crosstelling Input (XTL) from other AN/FSQ sites
- Display and Warning Light System with dozens of consoles in various rooms having Situation Display Tubes, Digital Display Tubes, and controls (e.g., push buttons and light gun) including:
  - Duplex Maintenance Console (two), each DMC operated one of the Central Computer Systems and allowed diagnostics (a speaker was available)
  - Tracker Initiator Consoles for designating a "blip" (radar return) to be tracked (assign a track number and to relay speed, direction, and altitude)
  - Command Post Digital Display Desk
  - Senior Director's keyed console with the Bomarc fire button
  - LRI Monitor Console for monitoring Long Range Radar data
  - Large Board Projection Equipment Operator displays were directly copied on 35 mm film which were projected on the board.

Punched card data was transferred to and from the core memory as binary images. Only the rightmost 64 columns were transferred, with each row containing two 32-bit words. (The left columns could be punched using a special instruction.) Data were transferred to the line printer as a card image as well.

=== Core memory element ===
The FSQ-7 and -8 used core memory with 32-bit words plus a parity bit, operating at a 6-microsecond cycle time. Both machines had two banks of memory, memory 1 and memory 2 (Commonly referred to as Big Mem and little Mem). On the FSQ 7 memory 1 had 65,536 words and memory 2 had 4096 words. At Luke Air Force Base, the FSQ-7 held 65,536 words at each bank and the FSQ-8 4096 words at each bank.

For data storage, each word was divided into two halves, each half was a 15-bit number with a sign bit. Arithmetic operations were performed on both halves simultaneously. Each number was treated as a fraction between −1 and 1. This restriction is placed on data primarily so that the multiplication of two numbers will always result in a product smaller than either of the numbers, thus positively avoiding overflow. Properly scaling calculations was the responsibility of the programmer.

Instructions used the right half word plus the left sign bit to form addresses, yielding a 17-bit address space. The remainder of the left half word specified the operation. The first three bits after the sign specified an index register. The following bits specified an instruction class, class variation and instruction-dependent auxiliary information. Addresses were written in octal notation, with the two sign bits forming a prefix, so 2.07777 would be the highest word in memory 2.

Arithmetic registers were provided for both halves of the data word and included an accumulator, an A register that held the data value retrieved from memory, and a B register that held the least significant bits of a multiplication, the magnitude of a division, as well as shifted bits. There was also a program counter, four index registers, and a 16-bit real-time clock register which was incremented 32 times a second. Trigonometric sine and cosine functions used 1.4 degree precision (256 values) via look-up tables.

== See also ==
- List of vacuum-tube computers
- List of military electronics of the United States

Records
Preceded by IBM NORC	World's most powerful computer 1958–1959	Succeeded by IBM 7090
