= 36th Air Division =

36th Air Division

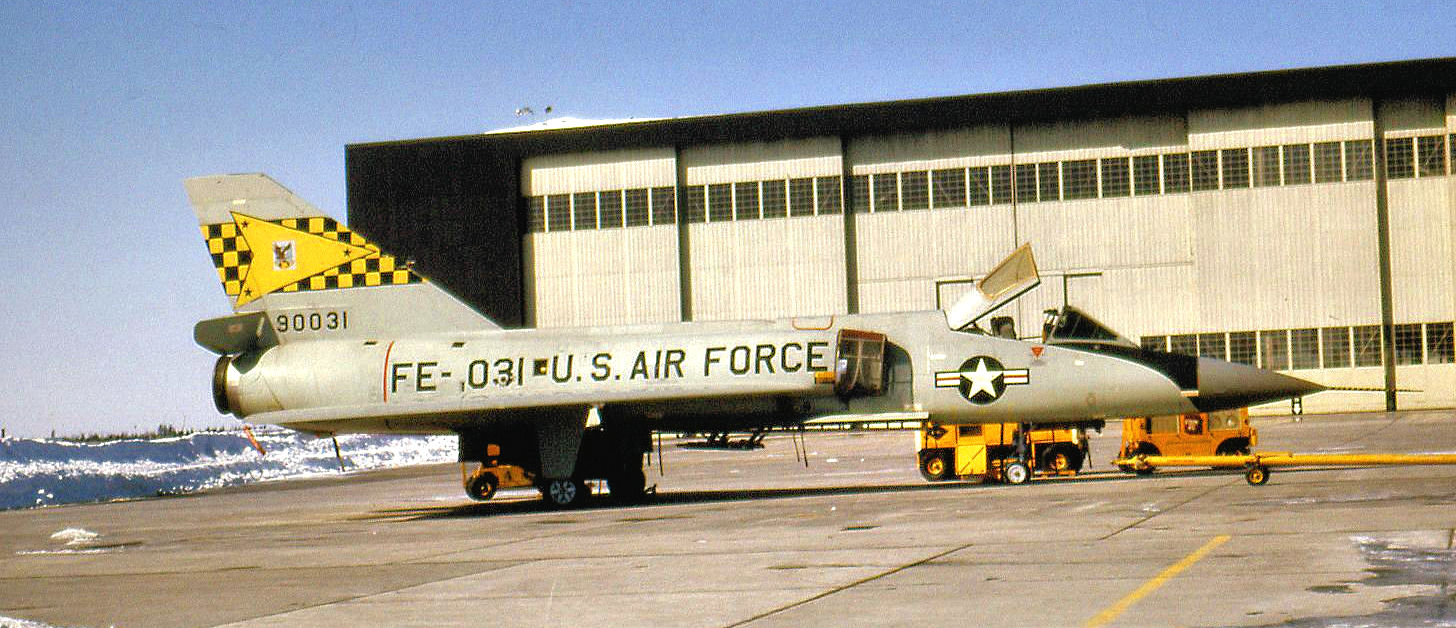
- 27th Fighter-Interceptor Squadron F-106
- Active: 1951–1960; 1966–1969
- Country: United States
- Branch: United States Air Force
- Garrison/HQ: see
- Equipment: below
- Decorations: see

Insignia
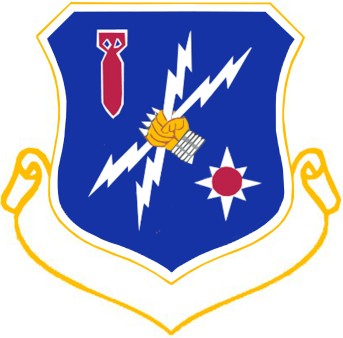
- 36th Air Division emblem (Approved 12 February 1952)

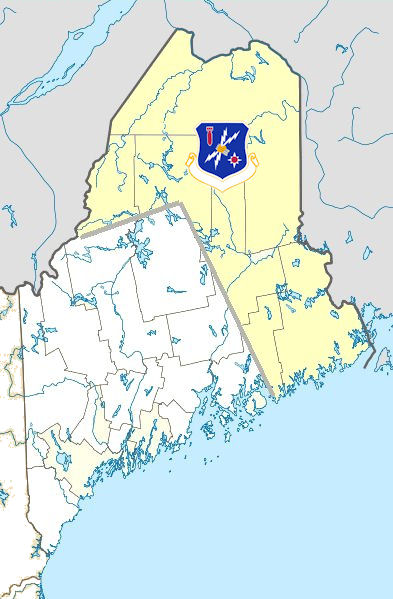
36th Air Division Air Defense Command AOR 1966–1969

The 36th Air Division is an inactive United States Air Force organization. Its last assignment was with First Air Force at Topsham Air Force Station, Maine. It was inactivated on 30 September 1969.

== History ==
=== Strategic Air Command ===
"The 36th Air Division was activated to solve the organizational and jurisdictional problems caused by placing two combat wings at Davis–Monthan Air Force Base in 1951. The division first flew Boeing B-29 Superfortresses and Boeing B-50 Superfortresses for bombardment operations, but by late 1954 it was completely equipped with Boeing B-47 Stratojet medium bombers. Conversion from KB-29s to KC-97s for refueling began in the summer of 1952 and ended in 1954."

"The division constantly flew training missions, engaged in simulated combat operations, and participated in joint exercises with the Air Defense Command. Until 1960, it continued its task of manning, training, and equipping the assigned bombardment wings with B-47s so that they would be ready for aerial warfare on a global scale." Inactivated with the turnover of Davis Monthan to Tactical Air Command in 1960.

=== Air Defense Command ===
Reactivated as part of First Air Force (Air Defense Command), April 1966. "The division administered, trained, and placed all available combat capable forces, including surveillance and control elements, in a maximum state of readiness for air defense missions, and participated in numerous exercises." Assumed additional designation of 36th NORAD Region after activation of the NORAD Combat Operations Center at the Cheyenne Mountain Complex, Colorado and reporting was transferred to NORAD from ADC at Ent Air Force Base in April 1966.

Inactivated in 1969 due to budget reductions and the diminished air defense threat to the United States.

== Lineage ==
- Established as the 36 Air Division and organized on 4 September 1951
- Discontinued on 16 June 1952
- Activated on 16 June 1952
- Discontinued on 15 March 1960
- Activated on 20 January 1966 (not organized)
- Organized on 1 April 1966
- Inactivated on 30 September 1969

=== Assignments ===
- Fifteenth Air Force, 4 September 1951 – 16 June 1952; 16 June 1952 – 15 March 1960
- Air Defense Command, 20 January 1966 (not organized)
- First Air Force, 1 April 1966 – 30 September 1969

=== Stations ===
- Davis Monthan Air Force Base, Arizona, 4 September 1951 – 15 March 1960
- Topsham Air Force Station, Maine, 1 April 1966 – 30 September 1969

=== Components ===
==== Strategic Air Command ====
- 43d Bombardment Wing: 4 September 1951 – 6 June 1952. 16 June 1952 – 15 March 1960 (detached c. 10 March – 5 June 1953, 5 September – 10 December 1954, and 1 July – 1 October 1957)
- 303d Bombardment Wing: 4 September 1951 – 16 June 1952. 16 June 1952 – 15 March 1960 (detached 5 October – 6 November 1952, 4 March – 5 June 1954, 4 July – 4 October 1956, and 5 April – 4 July 1958)

==== Air Defense Command ====
===== Interceptor squadrons =====
- 27th Fighter-Interceptor Squadron: 1 April 1966 – 15 September 1969
- 75th Fighter-Interceptor Squadron: 1 April 1966 – 30 June 1968

===== Radar squadrons =====
- 765th Radar Squadron

Charleston Air Force Station, Maine, 1 April 1966 – 15 September 1969

- 766th Radar Squadron

Caswell Air Force Station, Maine, 1 April 1966 – 15 September 1969

- 907th Radar Squadron

Bucks Harbor Air Force Station, Maine, 1 April 1966 – 15 September 1969

== See also ==
- List of United States Air Force Aerospace Defense Command Interceptor Squadrons
- List of United States Air Force air divisions
- United States general surveillance radar stations
