= Topsham Air Force Station =

US Air Force data center station

Topsham Air Force Station
- Part of Air Defense Command (ADC)

Site information
- Type: Air Force Station
- Controlled by: United States Air Force

Location
- Location of Topsham AFS, Maine
- Coordinates: 43°56′42″N 069°57′46″W

Site history
- Built: 1957
- In use: 1957-1969

Garrison information
- Garrison: Bangor Air Defense Sector; 36th Air Division

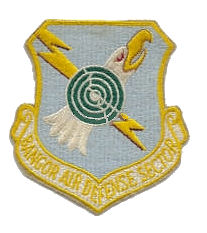
Emblem of the Bangor Air Defense Sector

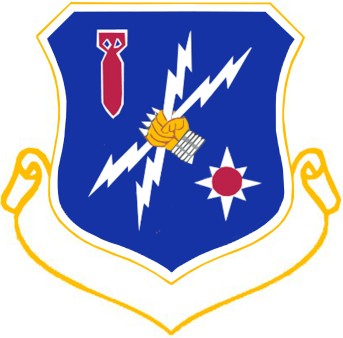
Emblem of the 36th Air Division

Topsham Air Force Station is a closed United States Air Force station. It is located 2.1 miles (3.4 km) north of Brunswick, Maine. It was closed in 1969.

== History ==
Topsham AFS was initially the headquarters of the Air Defense Command Bangor Air Defense Sector (BaADS), which was activated on 8 January 1957.

In 1958 a Semi Automatic Ground Environment (SAGE) Data Center (DC-05) was established at Topsham AFS. The SAGE system was a network linking Air Force (and later FAA) General Surveillance Radar stations into a centralized center for Air Defense, intended to provide early warning and response for a Soviet nuclear attack. A GATR site (R-25) was also constructed at Topsham as part of the 654th Radar Squadron at Brunswick AFS, but was reassigned to the BaADS at Topsham AFS when the 654th RADS was inactivated in 1965.

The BaADS was absorbed by the 36th Air Division, being moved to Topsham from Davis Monthan AFB, Arizona on 1 April 1966. DC-02 with its AN/FSQ-7 computer remained under the 34th AD until it, and the Air Division was inactivated on 30 September 1969 when technology advances allowed the Air Force to shut down many SAGE Data Centers.

With the inactivation of the 36th AD, the station and GATR site were closed. The former Topsham AFS is now an annex of the now-closed Naval Air Station Brunswick. The SAGE DC blockhouse was demolished in August 1985 and is now a recreation field.

=== Known ADCOM units assigned ===
- 36th Air Division, 1 April 1966 – 30 September 1969
- Bangor Air Defense Sector, 8 January 1957 – 1 April 1966

== See also ==
- List of USAF Aerospace Defense Command General Surveillance Radar Stations
