= CFS Barrington =

Former Canadian Forces Station in Nova Scotia

Site information
- Type: Radar Station
- Controlled by: Royal Canadian Air Force

Location
- Coordinates: 43°27′06″N 065°28′17″W

Site history
- Built: 1957
- In use: 1957–1990

Location of Canadian Forces Station Barrington, Nova Scotia

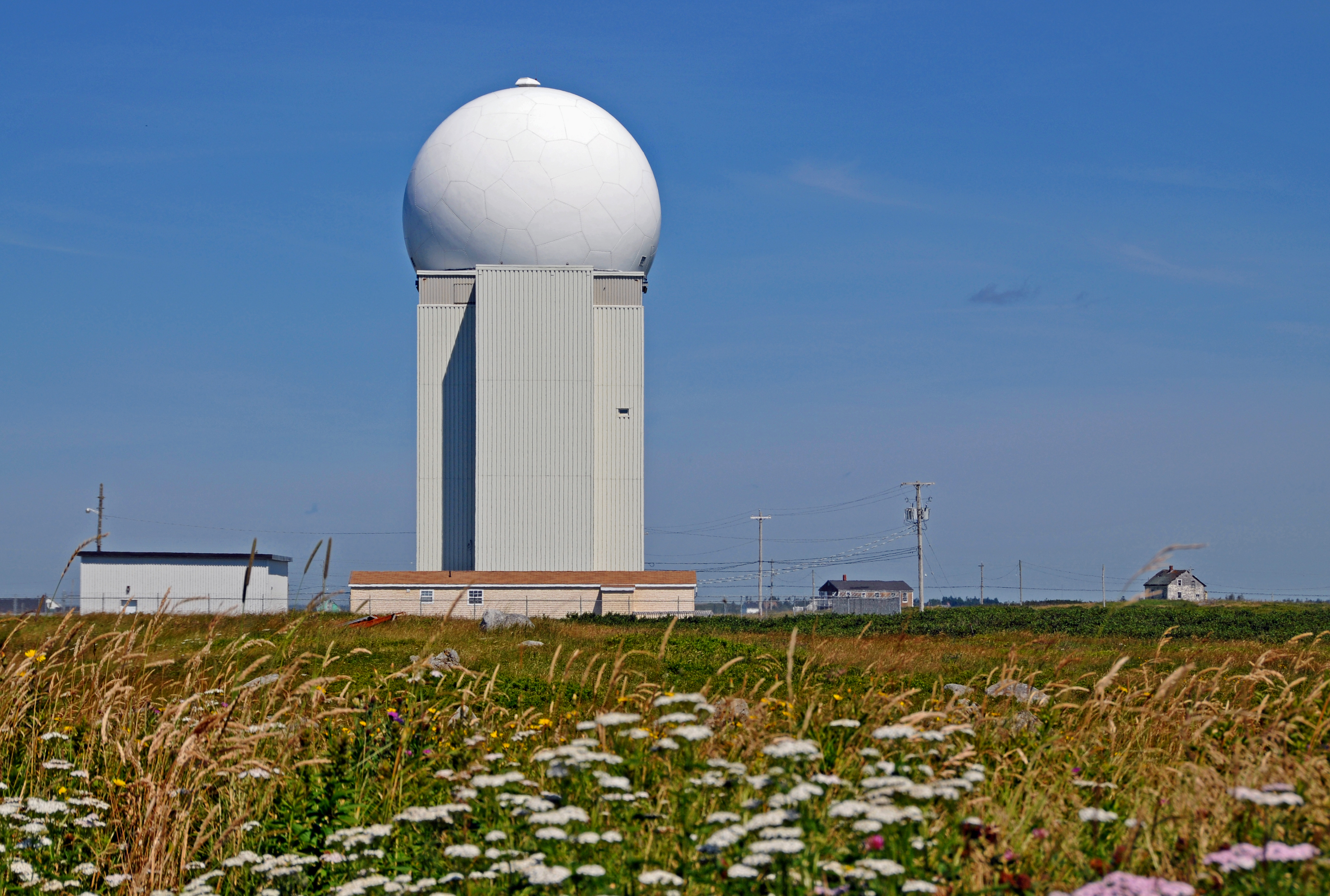
Canadian Coastal Radar at site of former CFS Barrington

Canadian Forces Station Barrington, also referred to as CFS Barrington, was a Canadian Forces Station located in the unincorporated community of Baccaro, Nova Scotia, at Baccaro Point near the south-western-most point of the province.

== History ==
In 1943 the Royal Canadian Navy (RCN) established a LORAN site at Baccaro Point to assist in navigation for Allied naval operations on the North Atlantic.

In a CBC interview in June 2019, 93-year-old Mary Owen, who served in the Women's Royal Canadian Naval Service, or "WRENS", recounted serving at Baccaro in 1944–45. She said 24 WRENS were assigned to the station when she was there. The station's personnel were given Bren guns, Sten guns, rifles, and explosives. The guns were to defend against any German landing parties, and the explosives were to destroy the secret LORAN equipment so that it would not fall into enemy hands. In late fall, two German submarines were reported to be a kilometre from the station, raising an apprehension that a landing was imminent. However, the submarines moved on. If they had not, Owen said, the WRENS' instructions were to

"Shoot, set the dynamite and then run like hell ... We were going to blow the whole thing up."

After the war, the LORAN site was operated by the Department of Transport.

In the early years of the Cold War, the RCN sought to establish a radar site on the Atlantic coast of Nova Scotia; a number of sites were considered, including remote Sable Island which was ultimately rejected by 1953 due to logistical problems. The Baccaro Point site was selected as it was near the southwesternmost point of Nova Scotia at Cape Sable Island and would provide maximum coverage area.

By that time, the Pinetree Line early warning radar network was being proposed by the United States Air Force (USAF) and Royal Canadian Air Force (RCAF). Construction of a Pinetree Line of Ground-Control Intercept (GCI) radar site began at Baccaro Point in 1955 and was completed in 1957. The facility was operated by the USAF as Barrington Air Station by the 672d Aircraft Control and Warning Squadron. Radars at the station were:

- Search Radars: AN/FPS-3, AN/FPS-27, AN/FPS-508
- Height Radars:AN/FPS-26, AN/FPS-6B, AN/FPS-6X

As a GCI base, the 672d's role was to guide interceptor aircraft toward unidentified intruders picked up on the unit's radar scopes. These interceptors were based at the 26th NORAD Region bases at Loring AFB and Dow AFB, Maine.

In the early 1960s, the USAF relinquished control of the base to the Royal Canadian Air Force (RCAF). This was part of an arrangement with the United States that came as a result of the cancellation of the Avro Arrow. Canada would lease 66 F-101 Voodoo fighters and take over operation of 12 Pinetree radar bases.

Upon hand-over on 1 June 1962, the operating unit was re-designated 23 Aircraft Control & Warning Squadron and the base became RCAF Station Barrington. Radar operations at 23 Squadron were automated on 1 July 1964 by the Semi Automatic Ground Environment (SAGE) system, and the station became a long-range radar site. It would no longer guide interceptors but only look for enemy aircraft, feeding data to the Boston Air Defense Sector SAGE DC-02 Direction Center of the 26th NORAD Region.

The facility was renamed CFS Barrington with the unification of the Canadian Forces on February 1, 1968, and the newly established 213 Radar Squadron reported to the 21st NORAD Region SAGE DC-03 Direction Center at Syracuse AFS.

In 1971 the Canadian Forces constructed a mobile home subdivision on Sherose Island 27 km west of the station for housing personnel and their families. Beginning in 1983, CFS Barrington began reporting to Canada East ROCC at CFB North Bay.

The long range early warning radar became obsolete by the late 1980s and the facility was decommissioned on August 1, 1990. The Baccaro Point site currently hosts a remotely operated Canadian Coastal Radar transmitter/receiver facility.

== See also ==
- List of Royal Canadian Air Force stations
- List of USAF Aerospace Defense Command General Surveillance Radar Stations
