= Western Air Defense Sector =

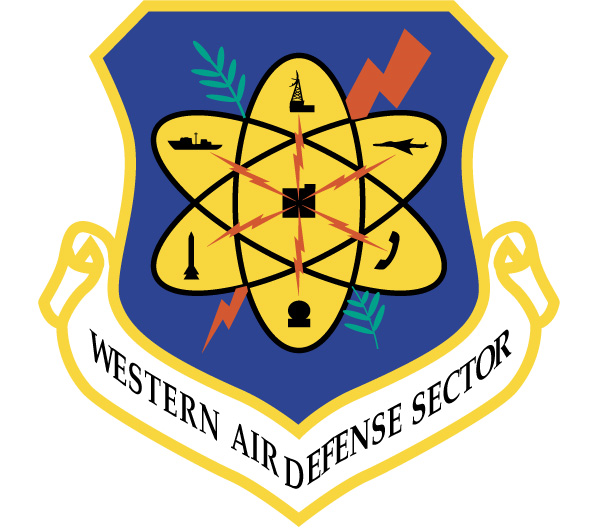
- Unit emblem
- Active: 1995–present
- Country: United States
- Branch: United States Air Force
- Type: Joint bi-national unit
- Role: Air defense command and control
- Part of: Washington Air National Guard and First Air Force (Air Forces Northern)
- Home base: McChord Air Force Base, Washington
- Nickname: "Bigfoot"
- Website: Official website

Commanders
- Current commander: Colonel Ashley E. Nowak (Title 10)

The Western Air Defense Sector (WADS) is a unit of the Washington Air National Guard located at Joint Base Lewis-McChord, Tacoma, Washington.

As a state militia unit, the Western Air Defense Sector is not in the normal United States Air Force chain of command. It is under the jurisdiction of the Washington Air National Guard unless it is federalized by order of the President of the United States. It is operationally gained by Air Combat Command.

The WADS is one of two Sectors responsible to the North American Aerospace Defense Command (NORAD) and the Continental NORAD Region for peacetime air sovereignty, strategic air defense, and airborne counter-drug operations in the continental United States. The other sector is the Eastern Air Defense Sector (EADS).

NORAD is a bi-national United States and Canadian organization charged with the missions of aerospace warning and aerospace control for North America.

Other NORAD air defense organizations include the Eastern Air Defense Sector (EADS), the Hawaii Region Air Operations Center (HIRAOC), the Alaska Region Air Operations Center (AKRAOC) and the Canada Air Defense Sector (CADS).

== Overview ==
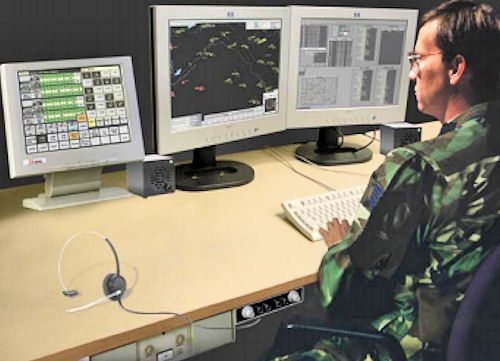
Battle Control System – fixed (BCS-F) display, used at the WADS Sector Operations Control Center (SOCC)

WADS operates a Sector Operations Control Center (SOCC) at McChord AFB, as part of the Joint Surveillance System (JSS) which had replaced SAGE in 1983. This system uses state-of-the-art air defense systems and computer technology to significantly increase surveillance and identification capabilities, and better protect the nation's airways from intrusion and attack. It relies on digitized radar inputs from Air Route Surveillance Radar (ARSR) sites jointly operated by the Federal Aviation Administration and the Air Force, and tethered aerostat radar balloons. It is fully integrated with Boeing E-3 Sentry Airborne early warning and control aircraft.

The SOCC employs 27 NORAD contingency suites, and 31 Battle Control System-Fixed (BCS-F) displays. BCS-F fuses data from airborne, ground and naval elements and civil air traffic sensors into an integrated air picture. This allows commanders to monitor the airspace above, beyond and within U.S. and Canadian borders, providing a major component for homeland defense.

It also incorporates a newly developed situational awareness system that gives WADS unprecedented tools and technology to assist state and local responders in dealing with natural disasters. It has the redundant capability to cover the EADS if the call arises.

WADS is a Washington Air National Guard unit which reports to AFNORTH/First Air Force at Tyndall AFB, Florida. The Sector reports to Air Combat Command (ACC) and to NORAD headquarters, in Colorado Springs, Colorado in its federal role.

== Mission ==
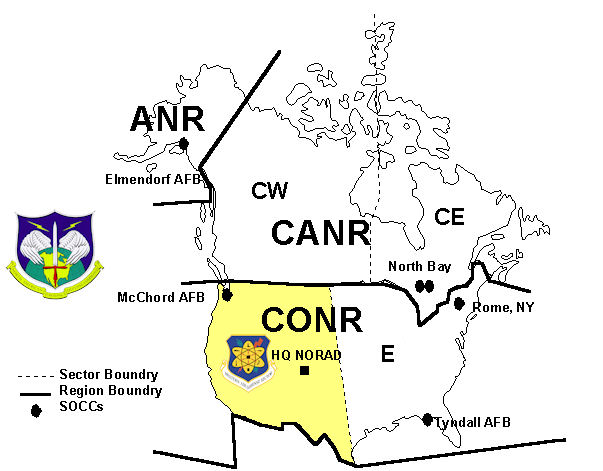
WADS Region shown in NORAD Region/Sector Configuration

The Sector's primary mission is Guarding America's Skies. This 24/7 guardian role involves the use of radar and communications systems to monitor air traffic from the Mississippi River west to the Pacific Ocean, and from the Canada–US border south to the Mexico–US border.

The WADS works closely with other federal agencies including the Federal Aviation Administration (FAA), Secret Service and U.S. Customs Service as well as its sister military services – the U.S. Navy, U.S. Army and U.S. Coast Guard.

As part of the Washington Air National Guard, WADS reports to the Governor through the Washington National Guard offices at Camp Murray. The Sector works with state agencies to provide rapid response in the event natural or manmade disasters, and participate in disaster preparedness exercises. The Sector is able to provide an air picture to help in rescue operations in the event of disasters.

== Assigned Units ==
Air National Guard units aligned under 1AF (AFNORTH) with an air defense mission under WADS are:

- California Air National Guard
  - 144th Fighter Wing (144th FW) – gained by Air Combat Command
    - 194th Fighter Squadron "Griffins" – F-15C/D RC-26B (Fresno ANG Base, California)
    - 194th Fighter Squadron Detachment 1 – F-15C/D (March Air Reserve Base, California)
- Oregon Air National Guard
  - 142nd Fighter Wing (142nd FW) – gained by Air Combat Command
    - 123rd Fighter Squadron "Redhawks" – F-15EX (Portland Air National Guard Base, Oregon)
  - 173rd Fighter Wing (173rd FW) – gained by Air Education and Training Command, F-15C/D OCU unit
    - 114th Fighter Squadron "Eager Beavers" – F-15C/D (Kingsley Field Air National Guard Base, Oregon)
- Arizona Air National Guard
  - 162nd Fighter Wing (162nd FW) – gained by Air Education and Training Command, the wing trains foreign F-16 pilots
    - 148th Fighter Squadron "Kickin' Ass" – F-16AM/BM (Tucson Air National Guard Base, Arizona)
    - 195th Fighter Squadron "Warhawks" – F-16C/D, RC-26B (Tucson Air National Guard Base, Arizona)
    - 152nd Fighter Squadron "Tigers" – F-16C/CM/D/DM (Tucson Air National Guard Base, Arizona)
      - 152nd Fighter Squadron Detachment 1 – F-16C/CM/D/DM (Davis–Monthan Air Force Base, Arizona)
    - 162nd Fighter Wing Detachment 1 – various (Operation Snowbird) (Davis–Monthan Air Force Base, Arizona)
- Colorado Air National Guard
  - 140th Fighter Wing (140th FW) – gained by Air Combat Command
    - 120th Fighter Squadron "Cougars" – F-16C/D (Buckley Space Force Base, Colorado)
- Oklahoma Air National Guard
  - 138th Fighter Wing (138th FW) – gained by Air Combat Command
    - 125th Fighter Squadron "Tulsa Vipers" – F-16CM/DM (Tulsa ANG Base, Oklahoma)
    - 125th Fighter Squadron Detachment 1 – F-16CM/DM (Ellington Field Joint Reserve Base, Texas)
- South Dakota Air National Guard
  - 114th Fighter Wing (114th FW) – gained by Air Combat Command
    - 175th Fighter Squadron "Lobos" – F-16CM/DM (Joe Foss Field ANG Station, South Dakota)
- Texas Air National Guard
  - 149th Fighter Wing (149th FW) – gained by Air Education and Training Command
    - 182nd Fighter Squadron "Lone Star Gunfighters" – F-16C/D (Kelly Field Annex, satellite facility of Lackland Air Force Base, Texas)
- Washington Air National Guard
  - 225th Air Defense Group
    - 225th Air Defense Squadron
    - 225th Support Squadron

== History ==
=== 1950s and 1960s ===
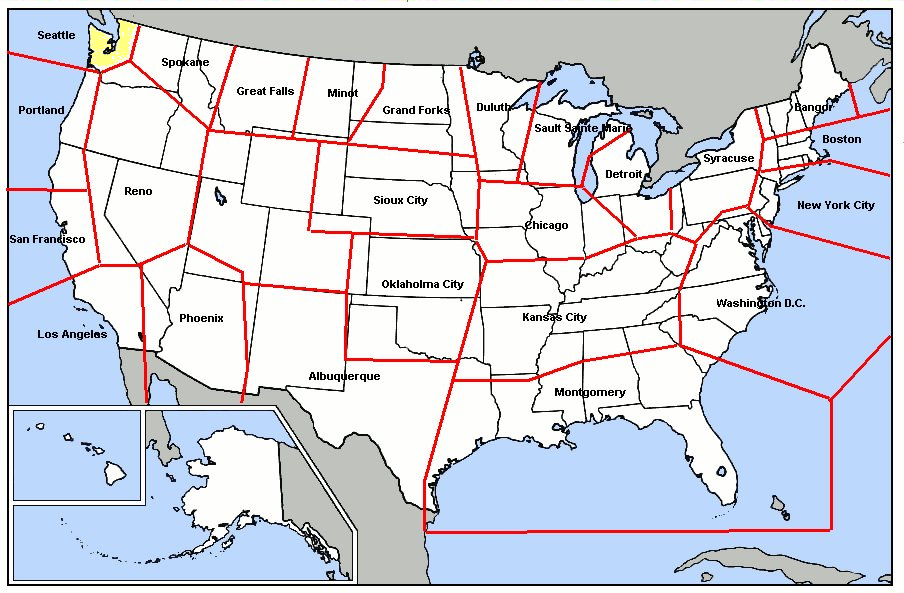
Historical map of Seattle Air Defense Sector, 1958–1966

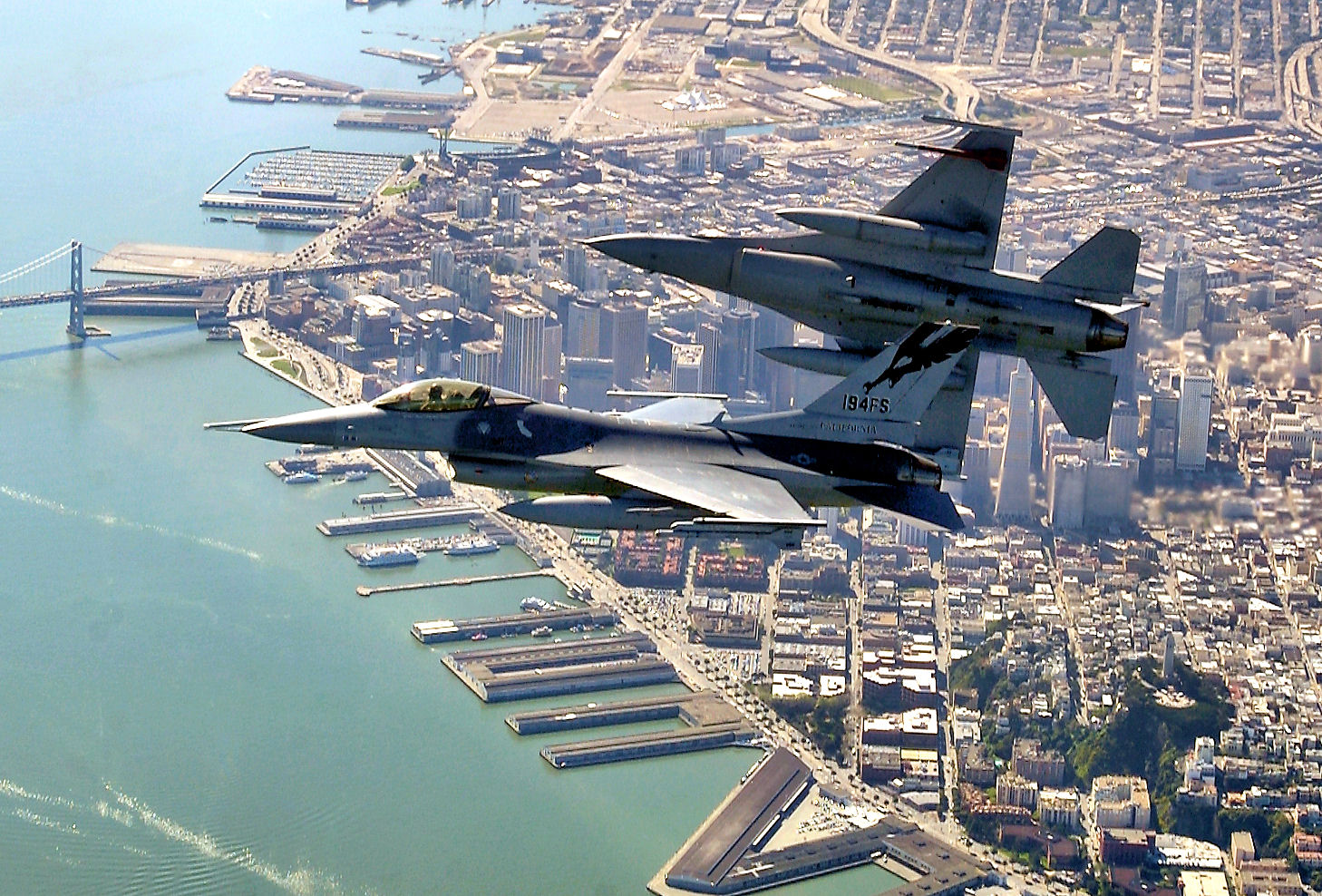
California Air National Guard 144th Fighter Wing F-16s Falcons over San Francisco Bay

The WADS predecessor unit, the Seattle Air Defense Sector was established by the USAF Air Defense Command on 8 January 1958 with a mission to train and maintain tactical flying units in state of readiness in order to defend the Seattle area, assuming control of former ADC Western Air Defense Force units located in western Washington west of the Cascade Range. The Sector was inactivated on 1 April 1966 as part of an ADC consolidation and reorganization; and its units were reassigned to the 25th Air Division.

Beginning on 1 July 1958 it began operations of a SAGE (Semi-Automatic Ground Environment) Direction Center DC-1247°07′18″N 122°30′14″W at McChord AFB. It also operated a SAGE Combat Center (CC-03). SAGE inactivated 31 August 1983

On 1 April 1966, SEADS was inactivated, as did the other 22 sectors in the country. Most of its assets were assumed by the 25th Air Division. The DC-12 SAGE Direction Center was assigned to the 25th Air Division, remaining in operation until 31 December 1969. Today it is used as the Western Air Defense Sector (WADS) Joint Surveillance System (JSS) Sector Operations Control Center (SOCC)

=== From 1987 ===
On 1 July 1987, the Seattle Air Defense Sector (SEADS) became the Northwest Air Defense Sector or NWADS, and was assigned to 25th Air Division, co-locating with the 25th AD. The 25th Air Division was inactivated on 30 September 1990, transferring its assets and responsibility for atmospheric defense to NWADS.

On 1 January 1995, the Northwest Air Defense Sector consolidated with the Southwest Air Defense Sector, its counterpart at March AFB, California, to become the Western Air Defense Sector (WADS). WADS assumed responsibility for the air sovereignty of the western United States from Texas around the west coast and across to North Dakota. Its area of responsibility is approximately 1.9 million square miles, about 63% of the continental United States.

On 1 October 1997, the Western Air Defense Sector completed a seamless transition from the active duty Air Force to the Air National Guard. Citizen-soldiers of the Washington Air National Guard are currently guarding America's skies. The Continental NORAD Region (CONR) has responsibility for the Western Air Defense Sector and Eastern Air Defense Sector. It is headquartered at Tyndall AFB, Florida.

At the end of 2005, the outdated Q-93 radar system was replaced with modernized computer systems which was a major shift in how CONUS is defended since the Q-93 system had been in use since 1983. Also, in 2005 Western Air Defense Sector assumed responsibility of more airspace shifting from down the center of the US to East of Mississippi totalling roughly 75% of the US airspace. There have been a few system updates since 2005 but only upgrades to the firmware and program versions, not the hardware itself like what happened in 2005.

=== Lineage ===
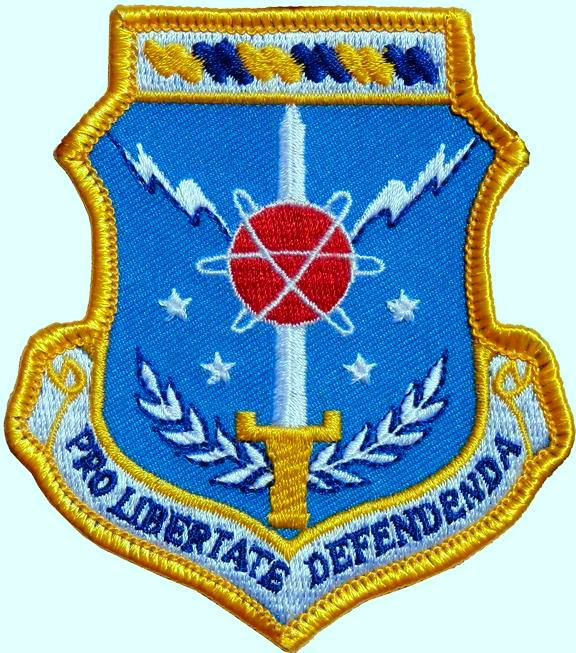
Historical emblem of the Southwest Air Defense Sector

- Established as Seattle Air Defense Sector on 8 January 1958

Inactivated on 1 April 1966

- Re-designated as Northwest Air Defense Sector (NWADS) and activated, 1 July 1987

Designation transferred from the USAF to the National Guard Bureau, 1 October 1997

- Allotted to Washington ANG, 1 October 1997

Re-designated as Western Air Defense Sector (WADS), extended federal recognition and activated, 1 October 1997

=== Assignments ===
- 25th Air Division, 8 January 1958 – 1 April 1966
- 25th Air Division, 1 July 1987
- First Air Force, 1 October 1990
- Washington Air National Guard

Gained by: First Air Force, Air Combat Command, 1 October 1997

=== Stations ===
- McChord AFB Washington, 8 January 1958 – 1 April 1966; 1 July 1987–Present

=== Components ===
==== Components ====
===== Wing =====
- 325th Fighter Wing (Air Defense)

McChord AFB, Washington, 10 February 1960 – 1 April 1966

===== Groups =====
- 57th Fighter Group (Air Defense)

Paine Field, Washington, 1 April 1961-1 April 1966

- 326th Fighter Group (Air Defense)

Paine Field, Washington, 10 February 1960-1 April 1961

===== Interceptor Squadrons =====
- 5th Fighter-Interceptor Squadron, 1 December 1987 – 1 July 1988

===== Radar Squadrons =====
- 635th Radar Squadron (SAGE)

Fort Lawton AFS, Washington, 11 June 1960-1 January 1963

- 636th Radar Squadron (SAGE)

Condon AFS, Oregon, 1 June 1963-1 April 1966

- 637th Radar Squadron (SAGE)

Othello AFS, Washington, 1 September 1963-1 April 1966

- 757th Radar Squadron (SAGE)

Blaine AFS, Washington, 1 March 1960-1 April 1966

- 758th Radar Squadron (SAGE)

Makah AFS, Washington, 1 March 1960-1 April 1966

- 759th Radar Squadron (SAGE)

Naselle AFS, Washington, 1 March 1960-1 April 1966

- 822d Radar Squadron (SAGE)

Cottonwood AFS, Idaho, 1 June 1963-25 June 1965

- 917th Aircraft Control and Warning Squadron

Puntzi Mountain AS, British Columbia, 1 March 1960-1 February 1963

- 918th Aircraft Control and Warning Squadron

Baldy Hughes AS, British Columbia, 1 March 1960-1 March 1963

- 689th Radar Squadron (SAGE)

Mount Hebo AFS, Oregon, added from DC-13 on 1 April 1966

== See also ==
- List of MAJCOM wings of the United States Air Force
- List of United States Air Force aircraft control and warning squadrons
- List of USAF Aerospace Defense Command General Surveillance Radar Stations
- Aerospace Defense Command Fighter Squadrons
- Alaskan Air Defense Sector
- Hawaii Region Air Operations Center
- North American Aerospace Defense Command
- Eastern Air Defense Sector
- Southwest Air Defense Sector
- Southeast Air Defense Sector
