= Portland Air Defense Sector =

Portland Air Defense Sector

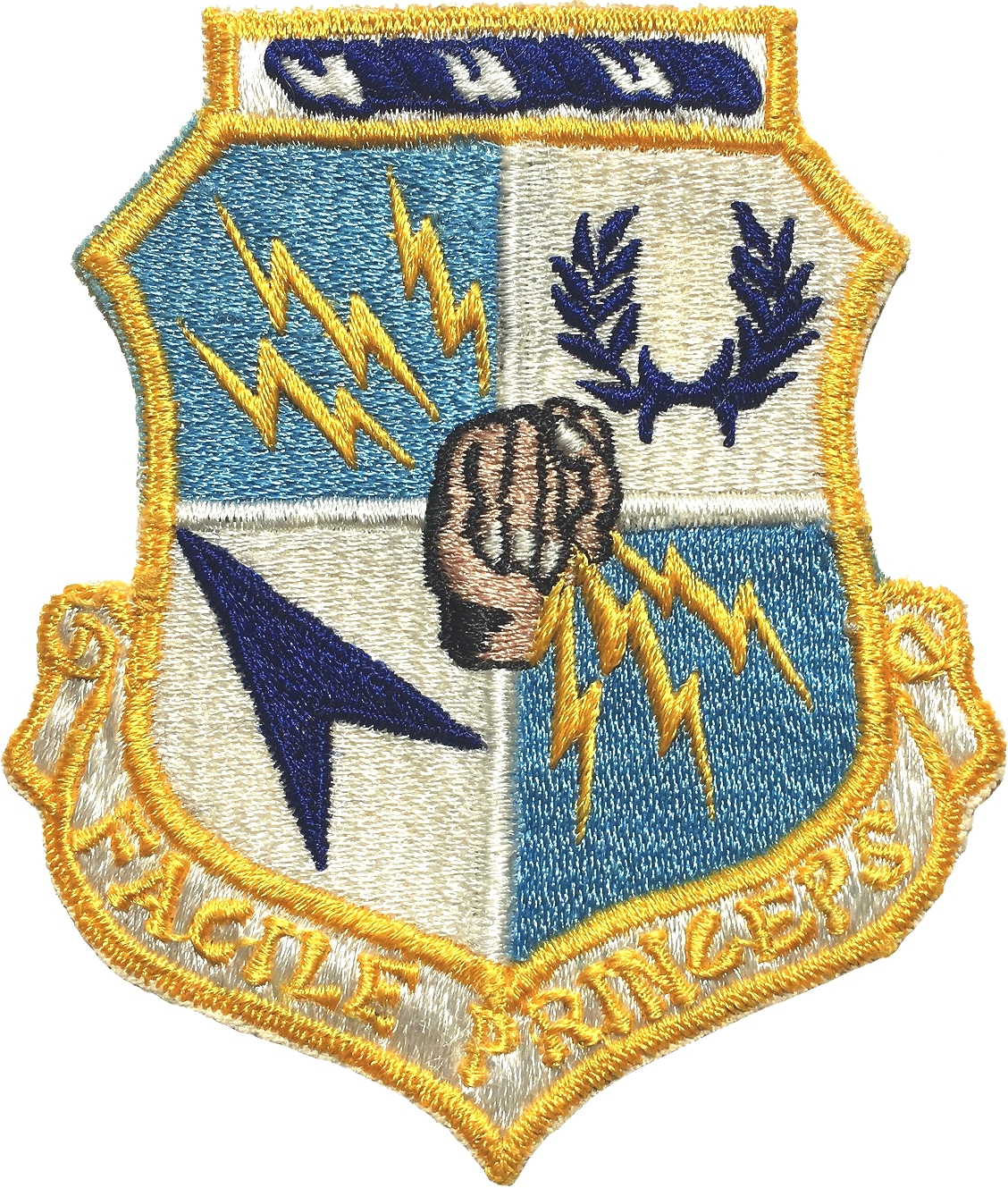
- Emblem of the Portland Air Defense Sector
- Active: 1948–1966
- Country: United States
- Branch: United States Air Force
- Role: Air Defense
- Part of: Air Defense Command

Commanders
- Notable commanders: Carroll W. McColpin

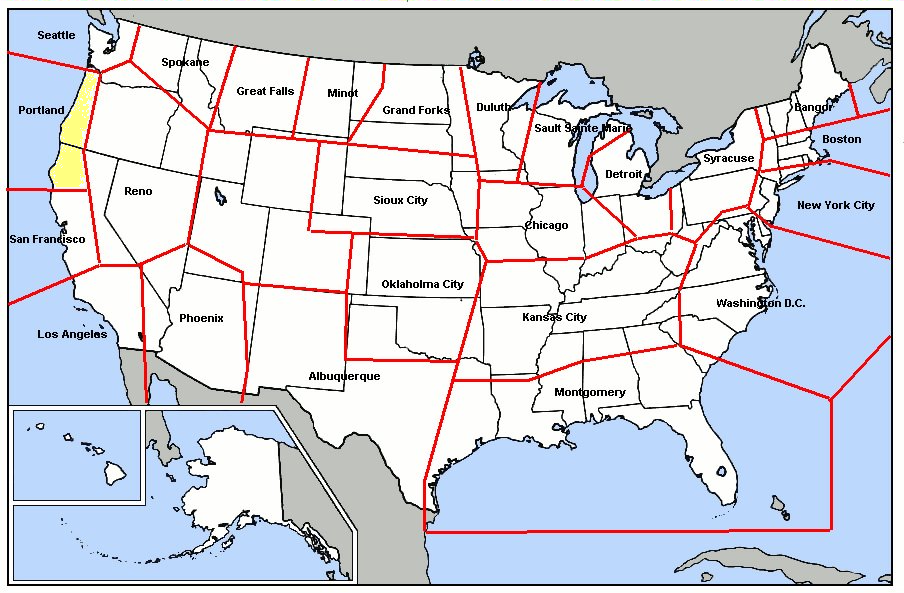
Map of Portland ADS

The Portland Air Defense Sector (PADS) is an inactive United States Air Force organization. Its last assignment was with the 25th Air Division, being stationed at Adair Air Force Station, Oregon. It was inactivated on 1 July 1969.

== History ==
PADS was established in June 1958 assuming control of former ADC Western Air Defense Force units in eastern Oregon and northwest California. The organization provided command and control over several aircraft and radar squadrons.

On 1 June 1960 the new Semi Automatic Ground Environment (SAGE) Direction Center (DC-13) became operational. 44°40′15″N 123°12′58″W DC-13 was equipped with dual AN/FSQ-7 Computers. The day-to-day operations of the command was to train and maintain tactical flying units flying jet interceptor aircraft (F-94 Starfire; F-102 Delta Dagger; F-106 Delta Dart) in a state of readiness with training missions and series of exercises with SAC and other units simulating interceptions of incoming enemy aircraft.

The Sector was inactivated on 1 April 1966 as part of an ADC consolidation and reorganization; and its units were reassigned to 28th Air Division. The 689th Radar Squadron (SAGE) was moved to DC-12, 25th Air Division, McChord AFB, WA, on 1 April 1966.

=== Lineage ===
- Established as Portland Air Defense Sector on 8 June 1958

Inactivated on 1 April 1966

=== Assignments ===
- 25th Air Division, 8 June 1958 – 1 April 1966

=== Stations ===
- Adair Air Force Station, Oregon, 8 June 1958 – 1 April 1966

=== Components ===
==== Groups ====
- 337th Fighter Group (Air Defense)

Portland IAP, Oregon, 15 April 1960 – 25 March 1966

- 408th Fighter Group (Air Defense)

Kingsley Field, Oregon, 15 April 1960 – 1 April 1966

==== Interceptor squadron ====
- 82d Fighter-Interceptor Squadron

Travis AFB, California, 1 August 1963 – 1 April 1966

==== Radar squadrons ====
- 666th Radar Squadron

Mill Valley AFS, California, 1 August 1963 – 1 April 1966

- 689th Radar Squadron

Mount Hebo AFS, Oregon, 1 March 1960 – 1 April 1966

- 761st Radar Squadron

North Bend AFS, Oregon, 1 March 1960 – 1 April 1966

- 776th Radar Squadron

Point Arena AFS, California, 1 August 1963 – 1 April 1966

- 777th Radar Squadron

Klamath AFS, Oregon, 1 March 1960 – 1 April 1966

- 827th Radar Squadron

Keno AFS, Oregon, 1 March 1960 – 1 April 1966

- 859th Radar Squadron

Red Bluff AFS, California, 1 March 1960 – 1 April 1966

== See also ==
- List of USAF Aerospace Defense Command General Surveillance Radar Stations
- Aerospace Defense Command Fighter Squadrons
