= Othello Air Force Station =

Radar station in Washington, US 1951–1975

Othello Air Force Station
- Part of Air Defense Command (ADC)

Site information
- Type: Air Force Station
- Controlled by: United States Air Force

Location
- Location of Othello AFS, Washington
- Coordinates: 46°43′17″N 119°10′48″W

Site history
- Built: 1951
- In use: 1951–1975

Garrison information
- Garrison: 637th Aircraft Control and Warning Squadron (later 637th Radar Squadron); 637th Air Defense Group

Othello Air Force Station (ADC ID: P-40, NORAD ID: Z-40) is a closed United States Air Force General Surveillance Radar station. It is located 7.2 miles (11.6 km) south of Othello, Washington. It was the home station of the 637th Aircraft Control and Warning Squadron (AC&W Sq) (later the 637th Radar Squadron) and the 637th Air Defense Group, closing in 1975.

== History ==
Othello Air Force Station was one of twenty-eight stations built as part of the second segment of the Air Defense Command permanent radar network. Prompted by the start of the Korean War, on 11 July 1950, the Secretary of the Air Force asked the Secretary of Defense for approval to expedite construction of the permanent network. Receiving the Defense Secretary's approval on 21 July, the Air Force directed the Corps of Engineers to proceed with construction. This site took over coverage once provided by the temporary "Lashup" site L-28, Spokane, Washington, which operated between 1950–1952.

The 637th AC&W Sq had moved to Saddle Mountain, Washington by 1 January 1951. The squadron began operating an AN/FPS-3 long-range search radar and an AN/FPS-5 height-finder radar in January 1952, assuming coverage from the temporary "lashup" sites L-29 at Larson AFB and L-30 at Richland, Washington. Initially the station functioned as a Ground-Control Intercept (GCI) and warning station. As a GCI station, the squadron's role was to guide interceptor aircraft toward unidentified intruders picked up on the unit's radar scopes. The site was renamed Othello Air Force Station on 1 December 1953.

In 1956 ADC replaced the height-finder radar with an AN/FPS-6. In 1958 the 637th AC&W Sq operated an AN/FPS-20 search radar and added an AN/FPS-6A height-finder radar. In July 1960 the joined the regional Semi-Automatic Ground Environment (SAGE) center, the squadron being redesignated as the 637th Radar Squadron (SAGE) on 1 September. The radar squadron provided information 24/7 the SAGE Direction Center where it was analyzed to determine range, direction altitude speed and whether or not aircraft were friendly or hostile. On 31 July 1963, the site was redesignated as NORAD ID Z-40.

In 1963 the AN/FPS-20 radar was replaced by an AN/FPS-7C set featuring an ECCM capability (the AN/FPS-7C was later modified to the AN/FPS-107 version). Also in 1963 the AN/FPS-6 was retired as an AN/FPS-26A height-finder radar was being installed, completed in 1964.

In addition to the main facility, Othello operated several AN/FPS-14 Gap Filler sites:

- Wenatchee, WA (P-40B) 47°30′32″N 120°14′25″W
- Okanogan, WA (P-40C) 48°31′41″N 119°56′38″W

The 637th Radar Sq was inactivated and replaced by the 637th Air Defense Group in March 1970. The upgrade to group status was done because of Othello AFS' status as a Backup Interceptor Control (BUIC) site. BUIC sites were alternate control sites in the event that SAGE Direction Centers became disabled and unable to control interceptor aircraft. The group was awarded the Air Force Outstanding Unit Award for the period from 1 March 1970 through 31 May 1971 for exceptionally meritorious service The group was inactivated and replaced by the 637th Radar Squadron. as defenses against crewed bombers were reduced. The group was disbanded in 1984.

The squadron was inactivated on 31 March 1975 due to a draw-down of ADC and budget constraints. Today, the site is abandoned and deteriorating, and has the look of a ghost town. The site and housing area are deteriorating, with tall weeds, grasses, and shrubs growing everywhere.

=== Units ===
- Constituted as 637th Aircraft Control and Warning Squadron

Activated 21 May 1947 at Long Beach Municipal Airport, CA
Moved to McChord Air Force Base, WA on 16 Apr 1948
Moved to Larson Air Force Base, WA on 28 January 1949
Moved to Saddle Mountain (later Othello AFS), WA ca. 1 January 1951
Redesignated 637th Radar Squadron (SAGE) on 1 September 1960
Inactivated on 1 March 1970
Redesignated 637th Radar Squadron on 1 January 1974
Activated on 17 January 1974
Inactivated on 31 March 1975

- Constituted as 637th Air Defense Group on 13 February 1970

Activated on 1 March 1970
Inactivated on 17 January 1974
Disbanded on 27 September 1984

==== Awards ====

- Air Force Outstanding Unit Award, 637th Air Defense Group 1 March 1970 – 31 May 1971

=== Assignments ===
- 505th Aircraft Control and Warning Group, ca. 1 January 1951
- 162nd Aircraft Control and Warning Group, 1 May 1951
- 25th Air Division, 6 February 1952
- 4702d Defense Wing, 1 February 1953
- 9th Air Division, 8 October 1954
- 25th Air Division, 15 August 1958
- 4700th Air Defense Wing, 1 September 1958
- Spokane Air Defense Sector, 1 March 1960
- Seattle Air Defense Sector, 1 September 1963
- 25th Air Division, 1 April 1966 – 31 March 1975

== See also ==
- List of United States Air Force aircraft control and warning squadrons
- United States general surveillance radar stations

== Notes and references ==
=== Bibliography ===
- Cornett, Lloyd H; Johnson, Mildred W (1980). A Handbook of Aerospace Defense Organization, 1946–1980 (PDF). Peterson AFB, CO: Office of History, Aerospace Defense Center. Archived from the original (PDF) on 23 November 2006.
- AF Pamphlet 900-2, Unit Decorations, Awards and Campaign Participation Credits, Vol II Department of the Air Force, Washington, DC, 30 Sep 1976

Further reading

- Grant, C.L., (1961) The Development of Continental Air Defense to 1 September 1954, USAF Historical Study No. 126
- Leonard, Barry (2009). History of Strategic Air and Ballistic Missile Defense (PDF). Vol. I. 1945–1955. Fort McNair, DC: Center for Military History. ISBN 978-1-437921311. Archived from the original (PDF) on 8 June 2010.
- Leonard, Barry (2009). History of Strategic Air and Ballistic Missile Defense (PDF). Vol. II, 1955–1972. Fort McNair, DC: Center for Military History. ISBN 978-1-437921311. Archived from the original (PDF) on 8 June 2010.
- Winkler, David F.; Webster, Julie L (1997). Searching the skies: The legacy of the United States Cold War Defense Radar Program. Champaign, IL: US Army Construction Engineering Research Laboratories. LCCN 97020912.
- Information for Othello AFS, WA and Othello Air Force Station
