= 505th Command and Control Wing =

United States Air Force military unit

505th Command and Control Wing
- Active: 1947–1952; 1965–1973; 1980–present
- Country: United States
- Branch: United States Air Force
- Type: Operational command and control
- Part of: United States Air Force Warfare Center
- Garrison/HQ: Hurlburt Field, Florida
- Motto: We are C2
- Decorations: Air Force Outstanding Unit Award with Combat "V" Device; Air Force Outstanding Unit Award; Air Force Organizational Excellence Award; Vietnamese Gallantry Cross with Palm

Commanders
- Current commander: Colonel James Fields II

Insignia
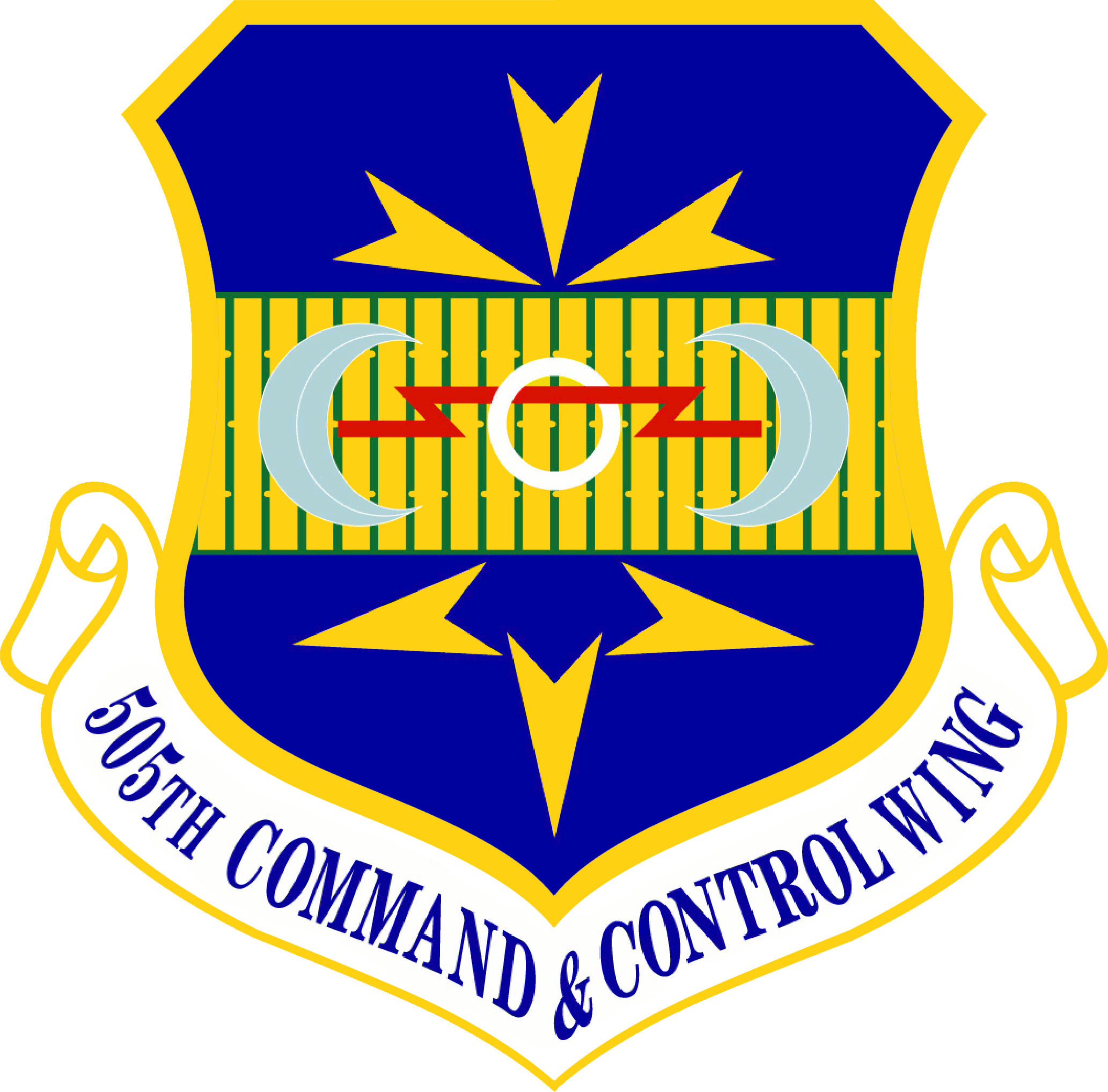
- 505th Command and Control Wing emblem (Approved 26 September 1966)

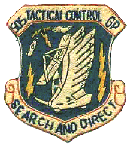
- Patch with early 505th Tactical Control Group emblem

The United States Air Force's 505th Command and Control Wing is organized under the United States Air Force Warfare Center. The wing is dedicated to improving readiness through integrated training, tactics development and operational testing for command and control of air, space and cyberspace. It hosts the Air Force's only Air Operations Center Formal Training Unit at Hurlburt Field, Florida.

The unit was first activated in 1947 under Air Defense Command (ADC) as the 505th Aircraft Control and Warning Group. It controlled radar units in the northwest until inactivating in February 1952, during a general reorganization of ADC.

It was activated again during the Vietnam War in November 1965. It initially commanded both aircraft warning units and forward air control squadrons, but in December 1966, those units were transferred to the 505th Tactical Air Control Group. It continued to manage the airspace over South Vietnam until the American withdrawal in 1973.

== Subordinate units ==
- Detachment 1 – Fort Leavenworth, Kansas (Note: Subordinate units and components are stationed with the wing headquarters except where noted.)
- 505th Combat Training Group at Nellis Air Force Base, Nevada
  - 505th Combat Training Squadron at Hurlburt Field, Florida
  - 505th Communications Squadron at Hurlburt Field, Florida
  - 705th Combat Training Squadron, also known as the Distributed Mission Operations Center (DMOC), home of VIRTUAL FLAG and Coalition VIRTUAL FLAG exercises at Kirtland Air Force Base, New Mexico
  - 805th Combat Training Squadron, also known as the Shadow Operations Center- Nellis (ShOC-N) at Nellis Air Force Base, Nevada
- 505th Test and Training Group (TTG) at Hurlburt Field, Florida
  - 84th Radar Evaluation Squadron at Hill Air Force Base, Utah
  - 505th Training Squadron at Hurlburt Field, Florida
  - 705th Training Squadron at Hurlburt Field, Florida
  - 605th Test and Evaluation Squadron (TES) at Hurlburt Field, Florida
    - 605 TES, Detachment 1 at Tinker Air Force Base, Oklahoma
    - 605 TES, Detachment 2 at Robins Air Force Base, Georgia
    - 605 TES, Detachment 3 at Beale Air Force Base, California

== History ==
=== Postwar era ===
On 21 May 1947, the wing was activated by Air Defense Command (ADC) as the 505th Aircraft Control and Warning Group, drawing on the personnel and assets of the former 412th Air Force Base Unit. Stationed at McChord Field it become the first of ADC's post-World War II aircraft control and warning units. For the remainder of 1947 the group supported two radar stations, one at Arlington, Washington, and one at Half Moon Bay near San Francisco. These stations worked with fighter squadrons to improve ground-control and interception techniques. The group included a fleet of B-25 Mitchells used extensively to perform radar calibration flights. The experience gained from operating the two sites proved invaluable to air defense planners who were in the process of designing a nationwide early warning radar network.

As tensions increased between the US and the Soviet Union, the group's mission grew in importance. In September 1949, the group no longer operated B-25s, yet it remained focused on early warning systems, supporting detachments along the Pacific Northwest coast. The group operated early warning operating radar systems, including the AN/TPS-1. On 15 March 1950, the reserve 564th ACWG was activated as a Corollary unit at Silver Lake, sharing the group's equipment and facilities. The 564th ACWG was called to active duty on 10 May 1951 and was inactivated, with its personnel used as fillers for the 505th. With a growing movement to assign homeland defense to reserve units, the 505 ACWG inactivated on 6 February 1952.

=== Vietnam War ===
On 2 November 1965, the 505 ACWG was re-activated as the 505th Tactical Control Group (TCG). Replacing the 6250th Tactical Air Support Group that activated three months earlier, 505 TCG called Tan Son Nhut Air Base in South Vietnam home. The 505th was responsible with providing Command and Control (C2), for the Tactical Control System in Southeast Asia (SEA). This mission included the operation of numerous radar sites throughout South Vietnam and Thailand from 1965 to 1973. In addition to the radar sites, the group managed O-1 Bird Dog observation aircraft assigned to five squadrons from late 1965 through 1966. These O-1 units included the 19th, 20th, 21st, 22nd and 23d Tactical Air Support Squadrons, operating from various bases throughout SEA. Forward Air Controllers (FACs) flew the "Bird Dogs" to find and mark enemy activity, direct air strikes and perform battle damage assessment.

Units included:

- The 619th Tactical Control Squadron activated at Tan Son Nhut Air Base on 8 April 1964 It was responsible for operating and maintaining air traffic control and radar direction-finding equipment for the area from the Mekong Delta to Ban Me Thuot in the Central Highlands with detachments at various smaller airfields throughout its operational area. It remained operational until 15 March 1973.
- The 620th Tactical Control Squadron with responsibility from Pleiku to the DMZ, was located at Monkey Mountain Facility.
- 505th Tactical Control Maintenance Squadron
- The 621st Tactical Control Squadron which supported tactical air operations in Thailand, located at Ubon Royal Thai Air Force Base, and later at Udon Royal Thai Air Force Base.
- The 19th TASS which operated mainly from the Central Highlands south, located at Bien Hoa Air Base.
- The 20th TASS based at Da Nang Air Base.
- The 21st TASS headquartered at Pleiku Air Base.
- The 22nd TASS based at Binh Thuy Air Base.
- The 23rd TASS based at Nakhon Phanom Royal Thai Air Force Base.

Maintenance support was provided by the 505th Tactical Control Maintenance Squadron first based at Tan Son Nhut and later at Bien Hoa AB. Initially assigned to the 2d Air Division in Vietnam, the 505th was reassigned to the Seventh Air Force on 1 April 1966. Soon afterward, the 505th received approval for its emblem and official motto – "Search and Direct". The group eventually lost its flying squadrons but the radar mission grew. The group was the only unit to furnish all of SEA an electronics ground environment system for aircraft control and warning and radar services. After eight years of service in Vietnam the group earned thirteen campaign streamers and five Air Force Outstanding Unit Awards with Combat "V" devices. With the American withdrawal in 1973 came the unit's inactivation.

=== Post-Vietnam era ===
The 505th's lineage continued with the activation of the 4442d Tactical Control Group on 1 March 1980. Functioning as the 4442d, the unit aligned under the USAF Tactical Air Warfare Center. The group established a headquarters at Hurlburt Field, Florida where it managed a command, control, communications (C3) and intelligence complex. Along with the C3 operations, the unit conducted operational tests and evaluated tactical air control elements. It also provided training on tactical air control and operated the USAF Air Ground Operations School until 1997. The 505th has remained at Hurlburt since 1980 but received several name changes to match the evolution of its mission.

With the elimination of MAJCOMs in 1991, the unit re-designated as the 505th Air Control Group. In April 1993, when the 505th began operating the new USAF Battlestaff Training School, the Air Force renamed the unit 505th Command and Control Evaluation Group. At the same time, the mission expanded to include a new detachment at Kirkland AFB, New Mexico. By 1998, with the ever-increasing importance of the Air Operations Center as a weapons system and the units expanding mission to train personnel in its use, the Air Force again changed the 505th's name, this time to the Air Force Command and Control Training and Innovation Center (AFC2TIC). The center continued to test new command and control systems and train personnel on their use in combat. Realizing that the center incorporated more than just a building with several detachments located around the US, the Air Force gave it group status on 15 April 1999.

=== Twenty-first century ===
The group became a wing on 12 March 2004. Now the 505th Command and Control Wing, it controls two groups: the 505th Test and Training Group at Hurlburt Field and the 505th Combat Training Group at Nellis Air Force Base.

== Lineage ==
505th Command and Control Wing

- Constituted as the 505th Aircraft Control and Warning Group on 2 May 1947

Activated on 21 May 1947
Inactivated on 6 February 1952

- Redesignated 505th Tactical Control Group and activated on 2 November 1965 (not organized)

Organized on 8 November 1965
Inactivated on 15 March 1973

- Consolidated on 1 November 1991 with the 4442d Tactical Control Group

Redesignated 505th Air Control Group on 1 November 1991
Redesignated 505th Command and Control Evaluation Group on 15 April 1993
Redesignated Air Force Command and Control Training and Innovation Center on 15 September 1998
Redesignated Air Force Command and Control Training and Innovation Group on 15 April 1999
Redesignated 505th Command and Control Wing on 12 March 2004

4442d Tactical Control Group

- Designated as the 4442d Tactical Control Group and activated on 1 March 1980
- Consolidated with the 505th Tactical Control Group as the 505th Tactical Control Group on 1 November 1991

=== Assignments ===
- Fourth Air Force, 21 May 1947
- 25th Air Division, 16 November 1949 – 6 February 1952
- Pacific Air Forces, 2 November 1965 (not organized)
- 2d Air Division, 8 November 1965
- Seventh Air Force, 1 April 1966 – 15 March 1973
- USAF Tactical Air Warfare Center (later USAF Air Warfare Center, 53d Wing), 1 March 1980
- Air and Space Command and Control Agency (later Aerospace Command and Control Agency, Aerospace Command and Control & Intelligence, Surveillance, and Reconnaissance Center), 1 October 1997
- Air Warfare Center (later United States Air Force Air Warfare Center), 1 June 1992 – present

=== Components ===
==== Groups ====
- 505th Combat Training Group, 12 March 2004 – present

Nellis Air Force Base, Nevada

- 505th Test and Training Group, 12 March 2004 – present

Hurlburt Field, Florida

==== Squadrons ====
Air Defense Command

- 634th Aircraft Control Squadron (later 634th Aircraft Control and Warning Squadron), 21 May 1947 – 6 February 1952
- 635th Aircraft Control and Warning Squadron, 21 May 1947 – 6 February 1952
- 636th Aircraft Control and Warning Squadron, 21 May 1947 – February 1949, December 1949 – 25 May 1951

Condon, Oregon after 27 June 1951

- 637th Aircraft Control and Warning Squadron, 21 May 1947 – 25 May 1951

Long Beach Municipal Airport until April 1948, Moses Lake Air Force Base, Washington, after January 1949, Saddle Mountain, Washington, 1 January 1951

- 638th Aircraft Control and Warning Squadron, 5 May 1950 – 25 May 1951

Mount Bonaparte, Washington,

- 757th Aircraft Control and Warning Squadron, 27 November 1950 – 6 February 1952

Birch Bay, Washington after 15 August 1951

- 758th Aircraft Control and Warning Squadron, 27 November 1950 – 6 February 1952

Bohokus Peak, Washington

- 759th Aircraft Control and Warning Squadron, 27 November 1950 – 6 February 1952

Naselle Air Force Station, Washington

- 760th Aircraft Control and Warning Squadron, 27 November 1950 – 25 May 1951

Colville Air Force Station, Washington

- 761st Aircraft Control and Warning Squadron, Oregon, 1 February 1951 – 6 February 1952

Reedsport, Oregon

Vietnam War

- 19th Tactical Air Support Squadron, 8 November 1965 – 8 December 1966
- 20th Attack Squadron, 8 November 1965 – 8 December 1966

Da Nang Air Base, South Vietnam

- Air Education and Training Command Studies and Analysis Squadron, 8 November 1965 – 8 December 1966

Pleiku Air Base, South Vietnam to September 1966 Nha Trang Air Base, South Vietnam

- 22nd Attack Squadron, 8 November 1965 – 8 December 1966

Binh Thuy Air Base, South Vietnam

- 23rd Flying Training Squadron, 15 April 1966 – 8 December 1966

Udorn Royal Thai Air Force Base to 15 July 1966, Nakon Phanom Royal Thai Air Force Base, Thailand

- 505th Tactical Control Maintenance Squadron, 8 November 1965 – 8 December 1966
- 506th Tactical Control Maintenance Squadron, 23 February 1966 – 8 December 1966
- 619th Tactical Control Squadron, 8 November 1965 – 15 March 1973
- 620th Tactical Control Squadron, 8 November 1965 – 15 March 1973

Da Nang Air Base, South Vietnam

- 621st Tactical Control Squadron, 23 February 1966 – 15 March 1973

Udorn Royal Thai Air Force Base, Thailand

Tactical Air and Air Combat Commands

- 84th Radar Evaluation Squadron, April 1993 – July 1998, 1 October 2005 – 17 March 2010
- 505th Systems Squadron (later 505th Communications Squadron), c. 15 April 1999 – 12 March 2004
- 505th Exercise Control Squadron, unknown – 12 March 2004
- 505th Operations Squadron, 15 November 1999 – 12 March 2004
- 505th Test Support Squadron, 15 April 1993 – unknown
- 605th Test Squadron (later 605th Test and Evaluation Squadron, 15 April 1993 – 12 March 2004
- 727th Air Control Squadron, 1 November 1991 – 1 October 1995

===== Detachments =====
- 11th Radar Calibration Detachment, 21 May 1947 – 11 November 1949
- Detachment 1, Headquarters 505th Command and Control Wing, 23 June 2005 – present

=== Stations ===
- McChord Field (later McChord Air Force Base), Washington 21 May 1947
- Silver Lake Air Warning Station, Washington, 26 September 1949
- McChord Air Force Base, Washington, 25 June 1951 – 6 February 1952
- Tan Son Nhut Airport, South Vietnam, 8 November 1965 – 15 March 1973
- Eglin Air Force Auxiliary Field No. 9 (Hurlburt Field), Florida, 1 March 1980 – present

=== Weapons Systems Operated ===
- North American B-25 Mitchell (1947–1949)
- Cessna O-1 Bird Dog (1965–1966)
- AN/USQ-163 Falconer AOC (since 2000)
