= Makah Air Force Station =

Radar station in Washington, US 1951–1988

Makah Air Force Station
- Part of Air Defense Command (ADC)

Site information
- Type: Air Force Station
- Controlled by: United States Air Force

Location
- Location of Makah AFS, Washington
- Coordinates: 48°22′18″N 124°40′30″W

Site history
- Built: 1951
- In use: 1951–1988

Garrison information
- Garrison: 758th Aircraft Control and Warning Squadron

Makah Air Force Station (ADC ID: P-44, NORAD ID: Z-44) is a closed United States Air Force General Surveillance Radar station. It is located 2.4 miles (3.9 km) south of Neah Bay, Washington. It was closed in 1988 by the Air Force, and turned over to the Federal Aviation Administration (FAA).

Today the site is part of the Joint Surveillance System (JSS), designated by NORAD as Western Air Defense Sector (WADS) Ground Equipment Facility J-80.

== History ==
Makah Air Force Station was one of twenty-eight stations built as part of the second segment of the Air Defense Command permanent radar network. Prompted by the start of the Korean War, on 11 July 1950, the Secretary of the Air Force asked the Secretary of Defense for approval to expedite construction of the permanent network. Receiving the Defense Secretary's approval on 21 July, the Air Force directed the Corps of Engineers to proceed with construction. The land for this site was leased from the Makah Indian tribe.

The 758th Aircraft Control and Warning Squadron (AC&W Sq) was activated at Bahokus Peak on 27 November 1950, which assumed coverage from the temporary "lashup" site L-34 at Neah Bay. The 758 AC&W Sq started operating an AN/FPS-3 long-range search radar and an AN/CPS-4 height-finder radar, and initially the station functioned as a Ground-Control Intercept (GCI) and warning station. As a GCI station, the squadron's role was to guide interceptor aircraft toward unidentified intruders picked up on the unit's radar scopes. The station was renamed Makah AFS on 1 December 1953.

During 1960, Makah AFS joined the Semi Automatic Ground Environment (SAGE) system, feeding data to DC-12 at McChord AFB, Washington. After joining, the squadron was redesignated as the 758th Radar Squadron (SAGE) on 1 April 1960. The radar squadron provided information 24/7 the SAGE Direction Center where it was analyzed to determine range, direction altitude speed and whether or not aircraft were friendly or hostile. During the 1960s, this site saw a variety of radars. By 1963, the squadron operated an AN/FPS-7A search radar and AN/FPS-90 and AN/FPS-26A height-finder radars.

Over the years, the equipment at the station was upgraded or modified to improve the efficiency and accuracy of the information gathered by the radars. In the 1970s, the AN/FPS-7A was modified to an AN/FPS-107V1. Circa 1977 the AN/FPS-90 height-finder radar was modified to an AN/FPS-116. In October 1979, Makah came under Tactical Air Command (TAC) jurisdiction with the inactivation of Aerospace Defense Command and the creation of ADTAC. Circa 1980 the AN/FPS-107V1 was replaced with an AN/FPS-91A search set, with an AN/TPS-43E search radar temporarily operating atop the old AN/FPS-26A tower during the radar change-over.

On 15 June 1988, the 758th Radar Squadron was inactivated and the Air Force reduced its presence at Makah Air Force Station, closing most facilities. The radar site was turned over to the FAA, however a small detachment from McChord AFB was assigned to maintain the radars. The AN/FPS-116 was retired c. 1988. In the latter 1990s, the AN/FPS-91A was replaced by an FAA-operated ARSR-4 radar. The FAA now the radar at the site as part of the Joint Surveillance System (JSS).

The station and housing were turned over to the Makah people, and the former Air Force station now is the Makah Tribal Council Center. It is well maintained and in use by the tribe.

== Air Force units and assignments ==
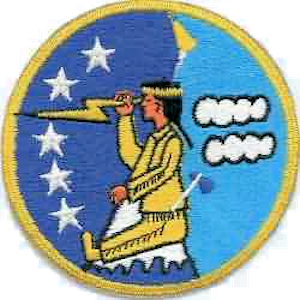
Emblem of the 758th Radar Squadron

=== Units ===
- Constituted as the 758th Aircraft Control and Warning Squadron on 14 November 1950

Activated at Bohokus Peak, WA on 27 November 1950
Site renamed Neah Bay Air Force Station on 1 December 1953
Site renamed Makah Air Force Station on 25 March 1958
Redesignated 758th Radar Squadron (SAGE) on 1 April 1960
Redesignated 758th Radar Squadron on 1 February 1974
Inactivated on 30 June 1988

=== Assignments ===
- 505th Aircraft Control and Warning Group, 27 November 1950
- 25th Air Division, 6 February 1952
- 4704th Defense Wing, 1 January 1953
- 25th Air Division, 8 October 1954
- Seattle Air Defense Sector, 1 March 1960
- 25th Air Division, 1 April 1966 – 30 June 1988

== See also ==
- United States general surveillance radar stations
