= North Bend Air Force Station =

Radar station in Oregon, US 1952–1980

North Bend Air Force Station
- Part of Air Defense Command (ADC)

Site information
- Type: Air Force Station
- Controlled by: United States Air Force

Location
- Location of North Bend AFS, Oregon
- Coordinates: 43°32′00″N 124°10′35″W

Site history
- Built: 1952
- In use: 1952–1980

Garrison information
- Garrison: 761st Aircraft Control and Warning Squadron

North Bend Air Force Station (ADC ID: P-12, NORAD ID: Z-12) is a closed United States Air Force General Surveillance Radar station. It is located 3.9 miles (6.3 km) north-northeast of Hauser, Oregon. It was closed in 1980.

== History ==
North Bend Air Force Station was one of twenty-eight stations built as part of the second segment of the Air Defense Command permanent radar network. Prompted by the start of the Korean War, on 11 July 1950, the Secretary of the Air Force asked the Secretary of Defense for approval to expedite construction of the permanent network. Receiving the Defense Secretary's approval on 21 July, the Air Force directed the Corps of Engineers to proceed with construction.

The 761st Aircraft Control and Warning Squadron was activated at Reedsport, Oregon, on 7 February 1951 with AN/FPS-3 and AN/FPS-4. With site P-12's activation, the temporary "lashup" site L-33 at Portland shut down. The site was renamed North Bend AFS on 1 December 1953, and initially the station functioned as a Ground-Control Intercept (GCI) and warning station. As a GCI station, the squadron's role was to guide interceptor aircraft toward unidentified intruders picked up on the unit's radar scopes.

In 1955 an AN/FPS-8 was installed. The radar subsequently was converted into an AN/GPS-3, and removed in 1956. In 1957 an AN/FPS-6 took over height-finder duties. An AN/FPS-6B was added in 1959. This site began operating an AN/FPS-7 search radar in 1960.

During 1960 North Bend AFS joined the Semi Automatic Ground Environment (SAGE) system, feeding data to DC-13 at Adair AFS, Oregon. After joining, the squadron was redesignated as the 761st Radar Squadron (SAGE) on 15 July 1960. The radar squadron provided information 24/7 the SAGE Direction Center where it was analyzed to determine range, direction altitude speed and whether or not aircraft were friendly or hostile. By 1963 AN/FPS-26A and AN/FPS-90 radars were performing height-finding duties. On 31 July 1963, the site was redesignated as NORAD ID Z-12. The AN/FPS-7 was subsequently upgraded to an AN/FPS-107 model.

In addition to the main facility, North Bend operated several AN/FPS-14 Gap Filler sites:

- Port Orford, OR (P-12A) 42°44′13″N 124°30′35″W
- Disston, OR (P-12B) 43°35′09″N 122°39′09″W
- Placer, OR (P-12C) 42°41′31″N 123°13′48″W

Over the years, the equipment at the station was upgraded or modified to improve the efficiency and accuracy of the information gathered by the radars. In 1979 North Bend came under Tactical Air Command (TAC) jurisdiction with the inactivation of Aerospace Defense Command and the creation of ADTAC. The 761st Radar Squadron (SAGE) was inactivated 11 February 1980 as a result of budget restrictions, and the general phase down of air defense radar stations.

With the station's closure, the site was turned over to the state of Oregon and it is now used as the Shutter Creek Correctional Institution (minimum-security prison)

== Air Force units and assignments ==
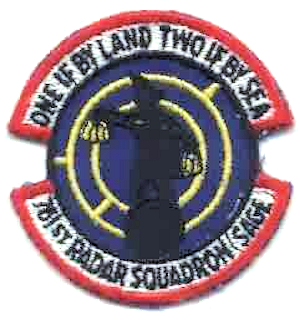
Emblem of the 761st Radar Squadron

=== Units ===
- Constituted as the 761st Aircraft Control and Warning Squadron

Activated at Reedsport, Oregon on 7 February 1951
Site renamed North Bend Air Force Station on 1 December 1953
Redesignated as the 761st Radar Squadron (SAGE) on 15 July 1960
Redesignated as the 761st Radar Squadron on 1 February 1974
Inactivated on 11 February 1980

=== Assignments ===
- 505th Aircraft Control and Warning Group, 7 February 1951
- 25th Air Division, 6 February 1952
- 4704th Defense Wing, 1 January 1953
- 25th Air Division, 8 October 1954
- Portland Air Defense Sector, 1 March 1960
- 26th Air Division, 1 April 1966
- 25th Air Division, 15 September 1969 – 11 February 1980

== See also ==
- United States general surveillance radar stations
