= Silver Lake Air Warning Station =

United States Air Force facility

Site information
- Type: Air Warning Station

Location
- Coordinates: 47°53′37″N 122°14′25″W

Site history
- Built: 1946
- In use: 1946-1953

Location of Silver Lake Air Warning Station, Washington

Silver Lake Air Warning Station is a closed United States Air Force facility. It was located 52.4 miles (84.3 km) north-northeast of McChord Field; 6.2 miles (10.0 km), south-southwest of Everett, Washington. It was closed in 1953.

It was the first postwar Air Warning Station under Air Defense Command.

== History ==
The War Department acquired the 93.5-acre property between 1946 and 1948 and used it as a regional air defense headquarters, incorporating transmitter and receiver facilities, housing, administration and recreational buildings. The 25th Air Division was activated at the station on 25 October 1948. (HQ ADC GO No. 101, 6 October 1948) with an authorized strength of 18 officers and 31 enlisted men. It was commanded by Brig Gen Ned Schramm, a World War II commander of the San Francisco Fighter Wing.

Initially under the Fourth Air Force, the 25th AD transferred from Fourth Air Force to Headquarters Air Defense Command; it redesignated as the 25th Air Division (Defense) on 20 June 1949 (HQ CONAC GO No. 58, 3 May 49). On 10 November 1949 the division transferred to the Western Air Defense Force. The 25th AD moved to McChord AFB, Washington, on 14 September 1951.

The Air Force declared the Silver Lake facility excess in 1953; it subsequently became residential and school property. Today, no evidence of the station remains, being part of the greater Seattle, Washington urban area.
