= Red Bluff Air Force Station =

Former US Air Force radar station

Red Bluff Air Force Station
- Part of Air Defense Command (ADC)

Site information
- Type: Air Force Station
- Controlled by: United States Air Force

Location
- Location of Red Bluff AFS, California
- Coordinates: 40°08′46″N 122°18′16″W

Site history
- Built: 1956
- In use: 1956-1970

Garrison information
- Garrison: 859th Aircraft Control and Warning Squadron

Red Bluff Air Force Station (ADC ID: SM-157, NORAD ID: Z-157) is a closed United States Air Force General Surveillance Radar station. It is located 4.3 miles (6.9 km) west-southwest of Red Bluff, California. It was closed in 1970.

== History ==
Red Bluff Air Force Station was initially part of Phase II of the Air Defense Command Mobile Radar program. The Air Force approved this expansion of the Mobile Radar program on October 23, 1952. Radars in this network were designated “SM.” The station consisted of 30.84 acres, was acquired by the Air Force on May 25, 1955.

The station became operational on 1 April 1956 when the 859th Aircraft Control and Warning Squadron was moved to the new station. Initially Red Bluff used AN/MPS-8 and AN/MPS-11 radars, and initially the station functioned as a Ground-Control Intercept (GCI) and warning station. As a GCI station, the squadron's role was to guide interceptor aircraft toward unidentified intruders picked up on the unit's radar scopes. The AN/MPS-11 remained until 1963. In 1959 the Air Force placed AN/FPS-6 and -6A height-finder radars and removed the AN/MPS-8 from Red Bluff.

During 1960 Red Bluff AFS joined the Semi Automatic Ground Environment (SAGE) system, feeding data to DC-13 at Adair AFS, Oregon. After joining, the squadron was redesignated as the 859th Radar Squadron (SAGE) on 15 July 1960. The radar squadron provided information 24/7 the SAGE Direction Center where it was analyzed to determine range, direction altitude speed and whether or not aircraft were friendly or hostile. On 31 July 1963, the site was redesignated as NORAD ID Z-157.

In 1964 Red Bluff became a joint-use facility with the Federal Aviation Administration (FAA), using the AN/FPS-67 search and AN/FPS-6 and AN/FPS-90 height-finder radars located on site.

In addition to the main facility, Red Bluff operated several AN/FPS-14 Gap Filler sites:

- Janesville, CA (SM-157A) 40°15′38″N 120°33′26″W
- Whitmore, CA (SM-157B) 40°44′33″N 121°47′24″W
- Hayfork, CA (SM-157C) 40°39′32″N 123°13′10″W

The 859th was inactivated 30 September 1970 and the station was closed due to budget restraints. 8.1 acres were turned over to the FAA on November 15, 1971, and 22.615 acres, currently known as Ridgeway County Park, were turned over to the Tehema County for use as a public park on August 2, 1972. The 4.24-acre Red Bluff Housing Annex included 16 family housing units, located within the city of Red Bluff in Tahema County. It was declared excess and turned over to GSA on December 10, 1970. In 1972, GSA quitclaimed portions of the 4.24 acres to 17 grantees, and the remaining 0.03 acres turned over to the City of Red Bluff by the Dept. of Health, Education, and Welfare. A 1991 Family Housing Area report stated that the original housing area, currently divided among 14 owners as 17 single-family homes, were all occupied.

The majority of the site (excluding Family Housing) is known as Ridgeway County Park, with the remainder used by the FAA as a weather station. Many of the original structures have been removed. Structures present and still in use at the time of a 1991 USACE site investigation include the operations building, rec hall, pump house and well, and sewage treatment facility. Structures still present but not used since DOD occupation include a swamp cooler for the rec hall, the sewage treatment plant chlorinator, and the sewage treatment pump house.

== Air Force units and assignments ==
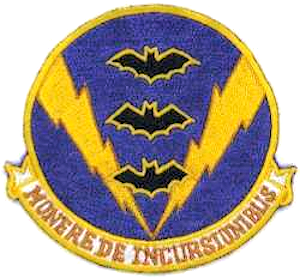
Emblem of the 859th Radar Squadron

=== Units ===
- Constituted as the 859th Aircraft Control and Warning Squadron

Activated at Hamilton AFB, California on 8 September 1955
Moved to Red Bluff AFS, California on 1 April 1956
Redesignated 859th Radar Squadron (SAGE) on 15 July 1960
Inactivated on 30 September 1970

=== Assignments ===
- 28th Air Division, 1 April 1956
- 25th Air Division, 1 March 1959
- Portland Air Defense Sector, 1 March 1960
- 26th Air Division, 1 April 1966 - 30 September 1970

== See also ==
- List of USAF Aerospace Defense Command General Surveillance Radar Stations
