= 25th Air Division =

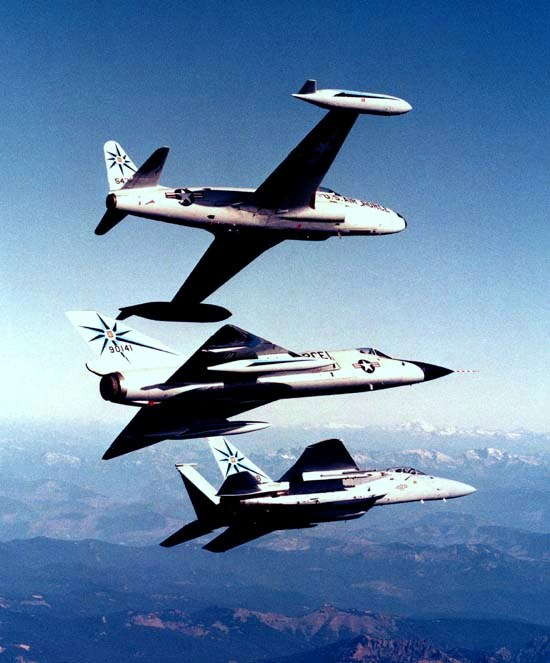
- T-33A "T-Bird" F-106A Delta Dart and F-15A Eagle from the 318th Fighter-Interceptor Squadron, McChord AFB, WA in formation near Mt Rainier in Washington State.
- Active: 1948–1952, 1952–1990
- Country: United States
- Branch: United States Air Force
- Role: Command of air defense forces
- Part of: Aerospace Defense Command, Tactical Air Command
- Decorations: Air Force Outstanding Unit Award

Insignia
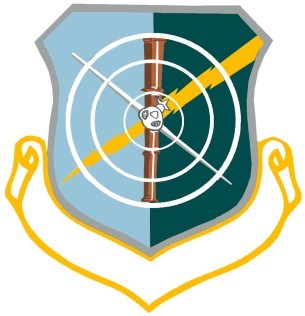
- 25th Air Division emblem (Approved 7 February 1953)

The 25th Air Division is an inactive United States Air Force intermediate echelon command and control organization. It was last assigned to First Air Force, Tactical Air Command (ADTAC). It was inactivated on 30 September 1990 at McChord Air Force Base, Washington.

== History ==
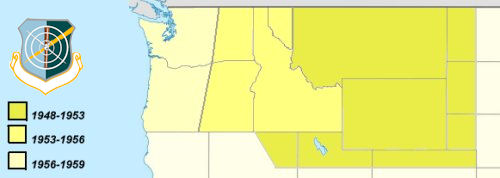
25th Air Division ADC AOR 1948–1959

The command was activated on 25 October 1948 being the first Air Division for air defense. Its headquarters was at Silver Lake Air Warning Station, near Everett, Washington under Continental Air Forces. The 25th AD did not assume any command responsibilities until 1949 when it became an intermediate level command under the Air Defense Command, Western Air Defense Force. Its initial Area of Responsibility (AOR) was a large area of the northwest Continental United States, from the 103rd meridian west and north of the 42nd parallel north. This encompassed an area consisting of the states of Washington, Oregon, Idaho, Montana and Wyoming and the western parts of North and South Dakota as well as Nebraska.

During the 1950s the AOR of the 25th AD changed frequently, but its core area always included the area of Washington State west of the Cascade Mountains. On 1 January 1951, Air Defense Command regained major command status, and the 25th AD was one of four Air Divisions assigned to the new command. Later that year, on 15 September HQ 25th AD was moved from Silver Lake to McChord Air Force Base, near Tacoma, Washington.

Beginning on 1 January 1958, it the command organization for the Seattle Air Defense Sector Semi Automatic Ground Environment (SAGE) Data Center (DC-12) at McChord. A few months later, on 1 September, the Portland Air Defense Sector, with its SAGE Direction Center (DC-13) at Adair Air Force Station, Oregon also came under the 25th AD; on 8 September the Spokane Air Defense Sector and DC-15 at Larson Air Force Base toned the 25th AD. In 1959, the Reno Air Defense Sector and DC-16 at Stead Air Force Base, Nevada was also incorporated.

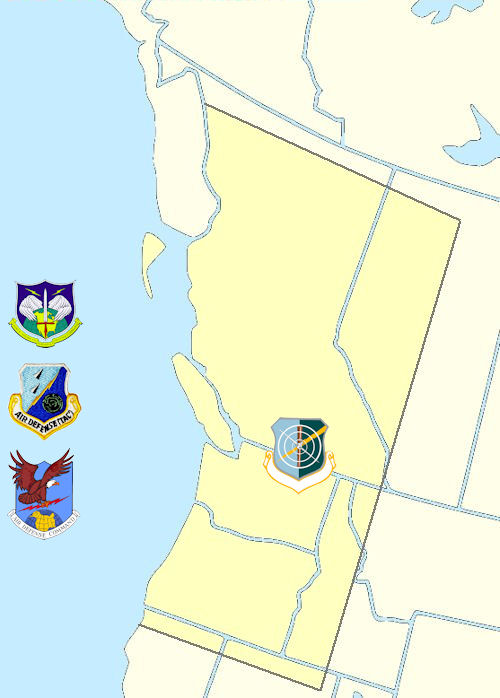
25th Air Division ADC/TAC/NORAD Region AOR 1966–1979

During the Cold War era, the 25th AD equipped, administered, trained and provided air defense combat ready forces within the northwestern United States. It exercised command jurisdiction over assigned units, installations, and facilities and provided and maintained facilities for the Air Division control center. In addition, the division and its subordinate units also participated in numerous tactical air defense training exercises. In the late 1950s, the Division also controlled United States-built radar stations in Western Canada as part of the Pinetree Line. These stations were turned over to the Royal Canadian Air Force in the early 1960s.

In May 1960, SAGE Combat Center Number 3 (CC-03) became operational at McChord, bringing these separate Direction Centers under a unified center under the 25th AD. In July, DC-16 at Stead was reassigned to the 28th Air Division at Hamilton Air Force Base, California and the inactivation of the Western Air Defense Force brought the 25th AD directly under the control of Air Defense Command. In 1966 it was assigned to Headquarters, Fourth Air Force at Hamilton, although it remained stationed at McChord. It also replaced the Seattle Air Defense Sector in 1966. Assumed additional designations of 25th NORAD Region and 25th CONAD Region after activation of the NORAD Combat Operations Center at the Cheyenne Mountain Complex, Colorado and reporting was transferred to NORAD from ADC at Ent Air Force Base in April 1966. Assumed additional designation 25th ADCOM Region on 8 December 1978.

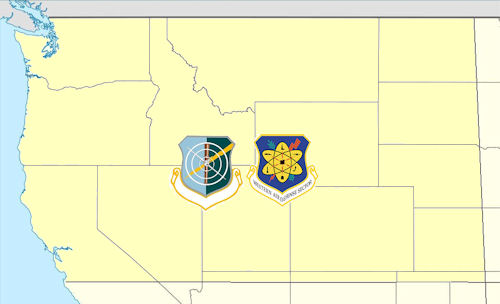
25th Air Division/Northwest Air Defense Sector AOR, 1987–1990

The division was a major part of Air Defense Command, and later Aerospace Defense Command (ADCOM) in 1968. In 1979 it was incorporated into Tactical Air Command with the inactivation of ADCOM as a major command. Under Air Defense Tactical Air Command. In 1985 most active-duty units of ADCOM were inactivated or reassigned to other missions, and the air defense mission came under Air Force Reserve and Air National Guard units under First Air Force.

It continued its mission until 1990, when the 25 AD was inactivated, with its mission and components becoming part of the First Air Force Northwest Air Defense Sector.

== Lineage ==
- Established as the 25 Air Defense Division on 27 September 1948

Activated on 25 October 1948
Redesignated 25 Air Division (Defense) on 20 June 1949
Inactivated on 1 February 1952

- Organized on 1 February 1952

Redesignated 25th Air Division (SAGE) on 1 March 1959
Redesignated 25th Air Division on 1 April 1966
Inactivated on 30 September 1990

=== Assignments ===
- Fourth Air Force, 25 October 1948
- Air Defense Command, 1 April 1949
- Fourth Air Force, 8 July 1949 (attached to Western Air Defense Force after 10 November 1949)
- Western Air Defense Force, 1 August 1950
- Air Defense Command, 1 July 1960
- Fourth Air Force, 1 April 1966
- Tenth Air Force, 15 September 1969
- Aerospace Defense Command, 1 December 1969
- Air Defense Tactical Air Command, 1 October 1979
- First Air Force, 6 December 1985 – 30 September 1990

=== Stations ===
- Silver Lake Air Warning Station, Washington, 25 October 1948
- McChord Air Force Base, Washington, 14 September 1951 – 30 September 1990

=== Components ===
==== Sectors ====
- Southwest Air Defense Sector: 1 July 1987 – 30 September 1990

March Air Force Base, California

- Northwest Air Defense Sector: 1 July 1987 – 30 September 1990

McChord Air Force Base, Washington

- Portland Air Defense Sector: 8 June 1958 – 1 April 1966

Adair Air Force Station, Oregon

- Reno Air Defense Sector: 15 February 1959 – 1 July 1960

Stead Air Force Base, Nevada

- Seattle Air Defense Sector: 8 January 1958 – 1 April 1966

McChord Air Force Base, Washington

- Spokane Air Defense Sector: 8 September 1958 – 1 September 1963.

Larson Air Force Base, Washington

==== Wings ====
- 325th Fighter Wing: 18 October 1956 – 10 February 1960; 1 April 1966 – 1 July 1968

McChord Air Force Base, Washington

- 4700th Air Defense Wing: 1 September 1958 – 15 May 1960

Geiger Field, Washington

- 4702d Defense Wing: 7 November 1952 – 8 October 1954

Hamilton Air Force Base, California
Geiger Field, Washington

- 4704th Defense Wing: 10 December 1952 – 8 October 1954.

McChord Air Force Base, Washington

==== Groups ====
- 57th Fighter Group (Air Defense)

Paine Field, Washington, 1 April 1966 – 30 September 1968
78th Fighter Group
Hamilton Air Force Base, California, 18 August 1955 – 1 July 1960

- 84th Fighter Group (Air Defense)

Geiger Field, Washington, 15 August – 1 September 1958

- 325th Fighter Group (Air Defense)

McChord Air Force Base, Washington, 18 August – 18 October 1956

- 326th Fighter Group (Air Defense)

Paine Field, Washington, 18 August 1955 – 10 February 1960

- 337th Fighter Group (Air Defense), 18 August 1955 – 15 April 1960

Portland Airport

- 408th Fighter Group (Air Defense)

Kingsley Field, Oregon, 1 March 1959 – 15 April 1960; 15 September 1969 – 1 October 1970

- 162d Aircraft Control and Warning Group (Federalzed ANG)

Larson Air Force Base, Washington, 25 June 1951 – 6 February 1952

- 503d Air Defense Group

Portland Airport, Washington, 8 October 1954 – 18 August 1955

- 505th Aircraft Control and Warning Group

Silver Lake AWS, Washington, 21 May 1947
McChord Air Force Base, Washington, 15 August 1951 – 6 February 1952

- 529th Air Defense Group

Paine Field, Washington, 8 October 1954 – 18 August 1955

- 567th Air Defense Group

Hamilton Air Force Base, California, 8 October 1954 – 18 August 1955 – 1 July 1960

- 4721st Air Defense Group

Larson Air Force Base, Washington, 15 August – 1 September 1968

==== Squadrons ====
===== Interceptor =====
- 5th Fighter-Interceptor Squadron

Minot Air Force Base, North Dakota, 1 June 1983 – 1 December 1987

- 318th Fighter-Interceptor Squadron

McChord Air Force Base, Washington, 18 August 1955 – 7 December 1989

322nd Fighter Interceptor squadron Kingsley Field, Oregon

- 323d Fighter-Interceptor Squadron

Larson Air Force Base, Washington, 26 November 1952 – 18 August 1955

- 460th Fighter-Interceptor Squadron

Grand Forks Air Force Base, North Dakota, 1 April 1971 – 30 July 1974

===== Radar =====
- 634th Aircraft Control and Warning Squadron (later 634th Radar Squadron)

Burns Air Force Station, Oregon, 20 June 1953 – 1 October 1954; 15 August 1958 – 1 September 1958; 15 September 1969 – 30 September 1970

- 635th Aircraft Control and Warning Squadron

Fort Lawton Air Force Station, Washington, 6 February 1952 – 1 January 1953; 1 January 1953 – 1 January 1953

- 636th Aircraft Control and Warning (later Radar) Squadron

Condon Air Force Station, Oregon, 6 February 1952 – 1 January 1953; 15 August – 1 September 1958; 15 September 1969 – 30 September 1970

- 637th Aircraft Control and Warning (later Radar) Squadron

Othello Air Force Station, Washington, 6 February 1952 – 1 January 1953; 15 August – 1 September 1958; 1 April 1966 – 31 March 1975

- 638th Aircraft Control and Warning Squadron

Curlew Air Force Station, Washington, 6 February 1952 – 1 January 1953; 15 August – 1 September 1958

- 680th Aircraft Control and Warning Squadron

Yaak Air Force Station, Montana, 15 August – 1 September 1958; 15 May – 1 July 1960

- 689th Aircraft Control and Warning Squadron (later 689th Radar Squadron)

Mount Hebo Air Force Station, Oregon, 8 October 1954 – 1 March 1960; 1 April 1966 – 30 June 1979

- 716th Radar Squadron

Kalispell Air Force Station, Montana, 19 November 1969 – 1 April 1978

- 757th Aircraft Control and Warning Squadron (later 757th Radar Squadron)

Blaine Air Force Station, Washington, 6 February 1952 – 1 January 1953; 8 October 1954 – 1 March 1960; 1 April 1966 – 1 January 1979

- 758th Aircraft Control and Warning Squadron (later 758th Radar Squadron)

Makah Air Force Station, Washington, 6 February 1952 – 1 January 1953; 8 October 1954 – 1 March 1960; 1 April 1966 – 30 June 1982

- 759th Aircraft Control and Warning Squadron (later 758th Radar Squadron)

Naselle Air Force Station, Washington, 6 February 1952 – 1 January 1953; 8 October 1954 – 1 March 1960; 1 April – 25 June 1966

- 760th Aircraft Control and Warning Squadron

Colville Air Force Station, Washington, 6 February 1952 – 1 January 1953; 15 August – 1 September 1958

- 761st Aircraft Control and Warning Squadron (later 761st Radar Squadron)

North Bend Air Force Station, Oregon, 6 February 1952 – 1 January 1953; 8 October 1954 – 1 March 1960; 15 September 1969 – 11 February 1980

- 777th Aircraft Control and Warning Squadron (later 777th Radar Squadron)

Klamath Air Force Station, California, 1 March 1959 – 1 March 1960; 15 September 1969 – 30 September 1981

- 821st Aircraft Control and Warning Squadron

Geiger Field, Washington, 15 August – 1 September 1958
Baker Air Force Station, Oregon, 15 May – 1 July 1960

- 822d Aircraft Control and Warning Squadron

Cottonwood Air Force Station, Idaho, 15 August – 1 September 1958

- 823d Aircraft Control and Warning Squadron (later 823d Radar Squadron)

Mica Peak Air Force Station, Washington, 15 August – 1 September 1958; 1 April 1966 – 1 June 1975

- 825th Aircraft Control and Warning Squadron

Kamloops Air Station, British Columbia, 1 September 1957 – 15 March 1960

- 827th Aircraft Control and Warning Squadron (later 827th Radar Squadron)

Keno Air Force Station, Oregon, 1 March 1959 – 1 March 1960; 1 March 1970 – 1 October 1979

- 859th Aircraft Control and Warning Squadron

Red Bluff Air Force Station, California, 1 March 1959 – 1 March 1960

- 917th Aircraft Control and Warning Squadron

Puntzi Mountain Air Station, British Columbia, 1 January 1953 – 1 March 1960

- 918th Aircraft Control and Warning Squadron

Baldy Hughes Air Station, British Columbia, 16 February 1953 – 1 March 1960

- 919th Aircraft Control and Warning Squadron

Saskatoon Mountain Air Station, Alberta, 16 February 1953 – 15 March 1960

== See also ==
- List of United States Air Force Aerospace Defense Command Interceptor Squadrons
- List of United States Air Force air divisions
- United States general surveillance radar stations
