= 529th Air Defense Group =

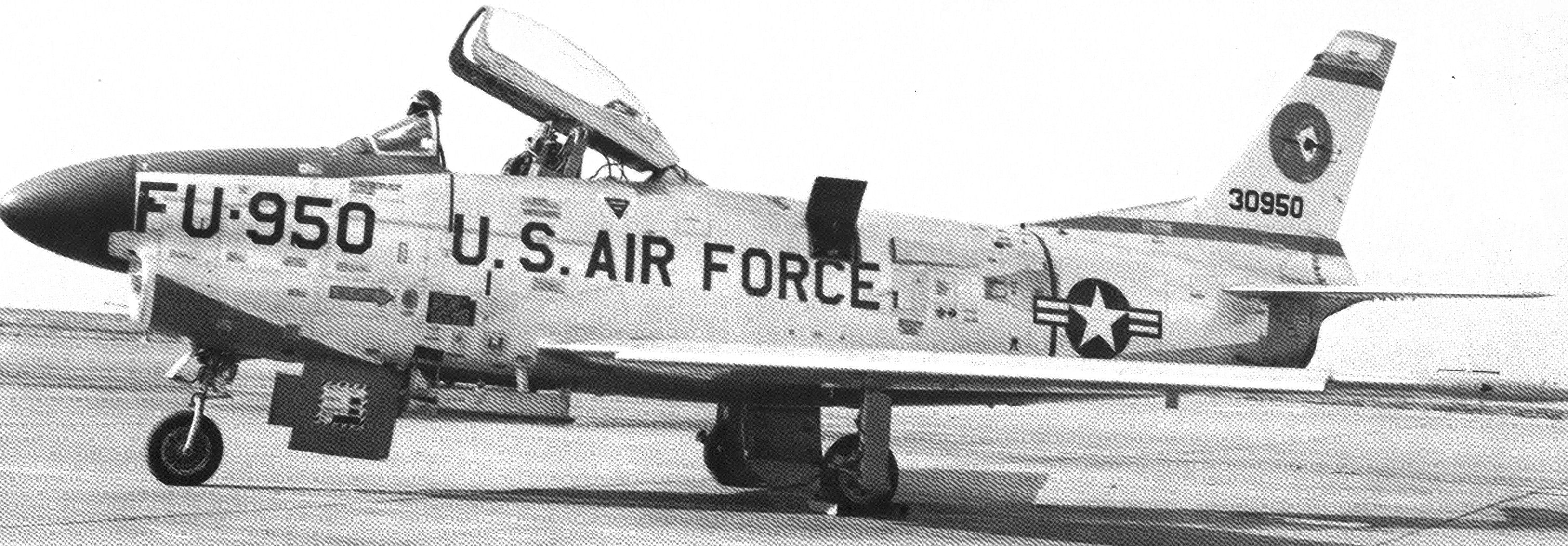
- North American F-86 of the 83d Fighter-Interceptor Squadron (Note: This aircraft was originally North American F-86D-60-NA Sabre, serial 53-950. it was modified as an F-86L in 1957. It later served with the California Air National Guard. It was transferred to the Military Aircraft Storage and Disposal Center on 11 January 1965 and scrapped on 22 June 1966. Baugher, Joe (2 April 2023). "1953 USAF Serial Numbers". Joe Baugher.)
- Active: 1945–1946; 1946–1947; 1953–1955
- Country: United States
- Branch: United States Air Force
- Type: Fighter interceptor
- Role: Air defense

The 529th Air Defense Group is a disbanded United States Air Force organization. Its last assignment was with the 25th Air Division at Paine Field, Washington, where it was inactivated on 18 August 1955. The group was originally activated as the 529th Air Service Group, a support unit for the 2d Bombardment Group at the end of World War II in Italy and then acted as a depot organization until inactivating in 1946. It was reactivated later that year and served at Dow Field, Maine as the support unit for the 14th Fighter Group, serving until it was replaced in the Wing Base reorganization of 1947.

The group was activated as the 529th Air Defense Group once again in 1953, when Air Defense Command (ADC) established it as the headquarters for a dispersed fighter-interceptor squadron and the medical, aircraft maintenance, and administrative squadrons supporting it. It was replaced in 1955 when ADC transferred its mission, equipment, and personnel to the 326th Fighter Group in a project that replaced air defense groups commanding fighter squadrons with fighter groups with distinguished records during World War II.

== History ==
=== World War II ===
The group was activated at Amendola Airfield, Italy as the 529th Air Service Group shortly after V-E Day as part of a reorganization of Army Air Forces (AAF) support groups in which the AAF replaced service groups that included personnel from other branches of the Army and supported two combat groups with air service groups including only Air Corps units. The group was designed to support a single combat group. Its 955th Air Engineering Squadron provided maintenance that was beyond the capability of the combat group, its 779th Air Materiel Squadron handled all supply matters, and its Headquarters & Base Services Squadron provided other support. The 529th supported the 2d Bombardment Group. The group moved with the 2d Group to Foggia, Italy where it added support responsibility for all military installations in the Foggia Airfield Complex. After the 2nd Group returned to the United States, the group was apparently used as a depot unit until it was inactivated in 1946.

=== Cold War ===
The group was again activated later that year and moved to Dow Field, Maine, where it provided support for the 14th Fighter Group. The group was inactivated and replaced by 14th Airdrome Group, 14th Station Medical Group, and 14th Maintenance & Supply Group in the experimental Wing/Base reorganization of 1947, designed to unify control at air bases. The group was disbanded in 1948.

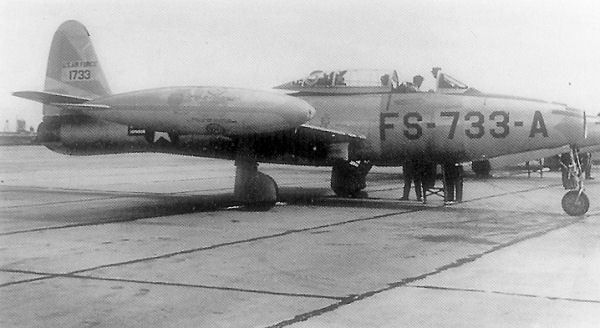
F-84G as flown briefly by the 83d FIS

The group was reconstituted, redesignated as the 529th Air Defense Group and activated at Paine Field, Washington on 18 February 1953 with responsibility for air defense of the Northwestern United States. The 529th was assigned the 83d Fighter-Interceptor Squadron (FIS), which was already stationed at Paine Field, flying Republic F-84 Thunderjets, as its operational component. The 83d FIS had been assigned directly to the 4704th Defense Wing. The group also replaced the 86th Air Base Squadron as USAF host organization at Paine Field. It was assigned three squadrons to perform its support responsibilities. It was also assigned the 17th Crash Rescue Boat Flight for water rescue duties.

By December 1953, the 83d FIS converted to radar equipped and Mighty Mouse rocket armed North American F-86D Sabres. When the 4704th Defense Wing was discontinued in 1954, the group was reassigned directly to the 25th Air Division. The group was inactivated and replaced by 326th Fighter Group (Air Defense) in 1955 as part of Air Defense Command's Project Arrow, which was designed to bring back on the active list the fighter units which had compiled memorable records in the two world wars. The group was disbanded again in 1984.

== Lineage ==
- Constituted as 529th Air Service Group c. 16 December 1944

Activated on 18 May 1945
Inactivated on 15 September 1946
Activated c. 1 October 1946
Inactivated on 15 August 1947
Disbanded on 8 October 1948

- Reconstituted and redesignated 529th Air Defense Group on 21 January 1953

Activated on 16 February 1953
Inactivated on 18 August 1955
Disbanded on 27 September 1984

=== Assignments ===
- XV Air Force Service Command, 18 May 1945
- Air Service Command, Mediterranean Theater of Operations, 1945
- Air Force General Depot, Naples 11 November 1945
- IX Air Force Service Command, ca. July 1946 – 15 September 1946
- Unknown c. 1 October 1946 – 15 August 1947 (Note: Probably First Air Force)
- 4704th Defense Wing, 16 February 1953
- 25th Air Division 8 October 1954 – 18 August 1955

=== Stations ===
- Amendola Airfield, Italy 18 May 1945
- Foggia, Italy c. July 1945 – unknown
- Mitchel Field, New York, c. 1 October 1946
- Dow Field, Maine, c. 20 November 1946 – 15 August 1947
- Paine Field, Washington, 16 February 1953 – 18 August 1955

=== Components ===
Operational Squadron

- 83d Fighter-Interceptor Squadron, 16 February 1953 – 18 August 1955

Support Units

- 529th Air Base Squadron, 16 February 1953 – 18 August 1955
- 529th Materiel Squadron, 16 February 1953 – 18 August 1955
- 529th Medical Squadron (later 529th USAF Infirmary), 16 February 1953 – 18 August 1955
- 779th Air Materiel Squadron, 18 May 1945 – 15 August 1947
- 955th Air Engineering Squadron, 18 May 1945 – 15 August 1947
- 17th Crash Rescue Boat Flight, c. 16 February 1953 – 18 August 1955

=== Aircraft ===
- Republic F-84G Thunderjet, 1953
- North American F-86D Sabre, 1953–1955

=== Commanders ===
- Lt Col. James J. Groves, 18 May 1945 – unknown
- Unknown 16 February 1953 – 18 August 1955

== See also ==
- Aerospace Defense Command Fighter Squadrons
- List of F-86 Sabre units
