= 637th Radar Squadron =

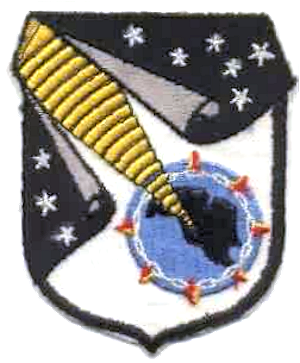
- Emblem of the 637th Radar Squadron
- Active: 1947-1970, 1974-1975
- Country: United States
- Branch: United States Air Force
- Type: General Radar Surveillance

The 637th Radar Squadron is an inactive United States Air Force unit. It was last assigned to the 25th Air Division, Aerospace Defense Command, stationed at Othello Air Force Station, Washington.

== History ==
The squadron was originally activated at Long Beach Municipal Airport CA as the 637th Aircraft Control & Warning Squadron as part of the initial cold war air defenses of the Western United States. The following year it moved to Lashup Site L-32 at McChord AFB, WA. In 1959, it moved to Site L-29 at Moses Lake AFB, WA.

The squadron finally moved to its final station at site LP-40 (later P-40, Z-40) on Saddle Mountain, WA in 1951. In 1960, the unit was integrated into the Semi Automatic Ground Environment (SAGE) control system and was redesignated the 637th Radar Squadron (SAGE). Because it was stationed at a Backup Interceptor Control (BUIC) site, it was inactivated in 1970 and replaced by the like numbered 637th Air Defense Group (ADG). As defense systems against crewed bomber threats were reduced, it was activated once again in 1974 to replace the 637th ADG. It was last inactivated on 31 March 1975.

The unit was a General Surveillance Radar squadron providing for the air defense of the United States.

== Lineage ==
- Constituted as the 637th Aircraft Control and Warning Squadron, 1947

Activated on 21 May 1947
Redesignated 637th Radar Squadron (SAGE), 1 September 1960
Inactivated, 1 March 1970
Activated, 1 January 1974
Inactivated on 31 March 1975

== Assignments ==
- 505th Aircraft Control and Warning Group, 21 May 1947
- 162d Aircraft Control and Warning Group (Federalized AZ ANG), 25 May 1951
- 25th Air Division, 6 February 1952
- 4702d Defense Wing, 1 January 1953
- 9th Air Division, 8 October 1954
- 25th Air Division, 15 August 1958
- 4700th Air Defense Wing, 1 September 1958
- Spokane Air Defense Sector, 15 March 1960
- Seattle Air Defense Sector, 1 September 1963
- 25th Air Division, 1 April 1966 - 1 March 1970
- 25th Air Division, 1 January 1974 - 31 March 1975
- Source

== Stations ==
- Long Beach Municipal Airport, CA, 21 May 1947
- McChord AFB, WA, 16 April 1948
- Moses Lake AFB (later Larson AFB) WA, 1 May 1949
- Saddle Mountain, WA, 1 January 1951

Site renamed Othello Air Force Station, 1 December 1953 - 31 March 1975

- Source
