= 4704th Defense Wing =

4704th Defense Wing

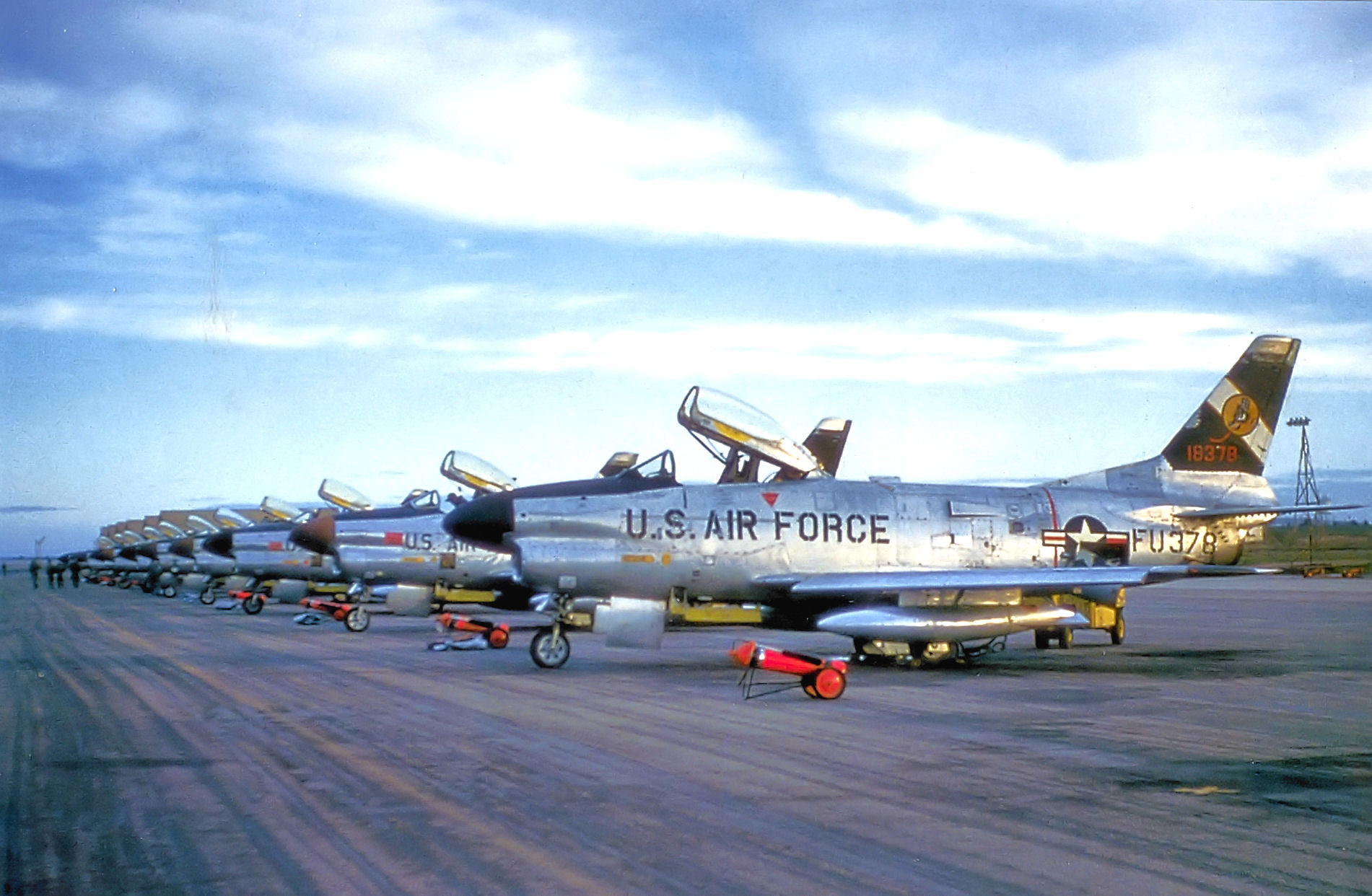
- F-86Ds of the wing's 357th Fighter-Interceptor Squadron
- Active: 1952–1954
- Country: United States
- Branch: United States Air Force
- Type: Fighter Interceptor and Radar
- Role: Air Defense
- Size: Wing
- Part of: Air Defense Command
- Garrison/HQ: McChord Air Force Base

The 4704th Defense Wing is a discontinued United States Air Force organization. Its last assignment was with the 25th Air Division of Air Defense Command (ADC) at McChord Air Force Base, Washington, where it was discontinued in 1954. It was established in 1952 at McChord in a general reorganization of ADC, which replaced wings responsible for a base with wings responsible for a geographical area. It commanded three fighter interceptor squadrons initially, and added three more squadrons before the end of the year. In early 1953 it added several radar squadrons in the Pacific Northwest, one of which was an Air National Guard squadron mobilized for the Korean War. When it was discontinued in the fall of 1954 its units transferred to the 25th Air Division.

== History ==
The wing was organized as the 4704th Defense Wing at the beginning of February 1952, in a major reorganization of ADC responding to ADC's difficulty under the existing wing base organizational structure in deploying fighter squadrons to best advantage. Five days later, the 325th Fighter-Interceptor Wing (FIW) was inactivated and its operational elements, including the 123rd Fighter-Interceptor Squadron (FIS), 317th FIS and 318th FIS, transferred to the 4704th Defense Wing. The support elements of the 325th FIW were transferred from that wing's 325th Air Base Group (ABG) and 325th Maintenance & Supply Group to the 4704th Wing's 567th ABG, which assumed host responsibility for USAF units at McChord. The 317th and 318th FIS at McChord flew Lockheed F-94 Starfire fighter interceptor aircraft, while the 123rd FIS, a Federalized Oregon Air National Guard (ANG) unit, at Portland AFB, flew World War II era F-51 Mustang aircraft. By June, the 123rd had converted to F-86 Sabre aircraft. The Wing's mission was to train and maintain tactical flying units in state of readiness to destroy enemy aircraft in order to defend Northwest United States. It also oversaw the transfer of Air Force facilities at Portland AFB from Tactical Air Command (TAC) to ADC in March 1952. It managed supporting units at McChord AFB for the 25th Air Division, and controlled host support squadrons at dispersed fighter bases.

Additional fighter squadrons were assigned to the wing during 1952. In March, the 82nd FIS, flying F-94s at Larson AFB, Washington was transferred from the 4703rd Defense Wing in preparation for the transfer of Larson from ADC to TAC. In August, the 83rd FIS, flying F-89 Scorpion aircraft moved to Paine AFB, WA and was assigned to the wing. At the beginning of November, the 123rd FIS was released back to the ANG and its personnel, mission and equipment were absorbed by the newly activating 357th FIS. A final fighter squadron, the 323d FIS at Larson AFB, which was assigned to the 25th Air Division, was briefly attached to the wing at the end of 1952.

At the beginning of 1953, the wing added the aircraft detection, warning and control mission, when six radar squadrons were assigned to it. ADC again made major organizational changes in February 1953 that affected the wing. The 567th ABG redesignated as the 567th Air Defense Group and assumed responsibility for command of the 317th and 318th FIS. The 503rd Air Defense Group activated at Portland AFB and the 357th FIS was assigned to it, while the 529th Air Defense Group activated at Paine AFB and the 83rd FIS was assigned to it. Responsibility for ADC units at Larson AFB transferred to the 4702nd Defense Wing. In October 1953, the Federalized 136th Aircraft Control & Warning Squadron (AC&W Sq) of the ANG was returned to the control of the State of Texas and its personnel and equipment transferred to the newly activated 689th AC&W Sq.

The wing was discontinued in 1954 and its equipment and personnel were transferred to other ADC units at McChord. Its subordinate air defense groups were then assigned directly to the 25th Air Division.

=== Lineage ===
- Designated as the 4704th Defense Wing and organized on 1 February 1952

Discontinued on 8 October 1954

=== Assignments ===
- Western Air Defense Force, 1 February 1952
- 25th Air Division, 10 December 1952 – 8 October 1954

=== Components ===
==== Groups ====
- 503rd Air Defense Group

Portland International Airport (formerly Portland AFB), 16 February 1953 – 8 October 1954

- 529th Air Defense Group

Paine Field (formerly Paine AFB), 16 February 1953 – 8 October 1954

- 567th Air Base Group (later 567th Air Defense Group), 1 February 1952 – 8 October 1954

==== Squadrons ====
Fighter Squadrons

- 82d Fighter-Interceptor Squadron

Larson AFB, WA, 13 March 1952 – 16 February 1953

- 83d Fighter-Interceptor Squadron

Paine AFB, WA, 1 August 1952 – 16 February 1953

- 123rd Fighter Interceptor Squadron

Portland AFB, OR, 6 February 1952 – 1 November 52

- 317th Fighter Interceptor Squadron, 6 February 1952 – 16 February 1953
- 318th Fighter Interceptor Squadron, 6 February 1952 – 16 February 1953
- 323d Fighter-Interceptor Squadron (attached)

Larson AFB, WA, 26 November 1952 – 19 January 1953

- 357th Fighter-Interceptor Squadron

Portland AFB, OR, 1 November 1952 – 16 February 1953

Support Squadrons

- 86th Air Base Squadron

Paine AFB, WA, 1 February 1952 – 16 February 1953

- 89th Air Base Squadron

Portland AFB, WA, ca. 1 April 1952 – 16 February 1953

Radar Squadrons

- 136th Aircraft Control & Warning Squadron

Portland AFB, OR, 16 February 1953 – 1 October 1953

- 635th Aircraft Control and Warning Squadron, 1 January 1953 – 8 October 1954
- 689th Aircraft Control & Warning Squadron

Portland International Airport, OR, 1 October 1953 – 8 October 1954

- 757th Aircraft Control and Warning Squadron

Birch Bay (renamed Blaine AFS), WA, 1 January 1953 – 8 October 1954

- 758th Aircraft Control and Warning Squadron

Neah Bay, OR, 1 January 1953 – 8 October 1954

- 759th Aircraft Control and Warning Squadron

Naselle AFS, OR, 1 January 1953 – 8 October 1954

- 761st Aircraft Control and Warning Squadron

Reedsport (renamed North Bend AFS), OR, 1 January 1953 – 8 October 1954

=== Stations ===
- McChord AFB, Washington, 1 February 1952 – 8 October 1954

=== Commanders ===
- Col. Alan T. Bennett, 1 February 1952 – ca. 1 January 1953
- Col. Loring F. Stetson, Jr., ca. 1 January 1953 – unknown

=== Aircraft ===
- F-84G, 1953
- F-86D, 1953–1954
- F-86F, 1952–1953
- F-89B, 1952–1953
- F-94A, 1952–1954
- F-94B, 1952–1953

== See also ==
- List of MAJCOM wings of the United States Air Force
- List of United States Air Force Aerospace Defense Command Interceptor Squadrons
- List of United States Air Force aircraft control and warning squadrons
- United States general surveillance radar stations
