= Hebo, Oregon =

Unincorporated community in the state of Oregon, United States

- Census-designated place (CDP)
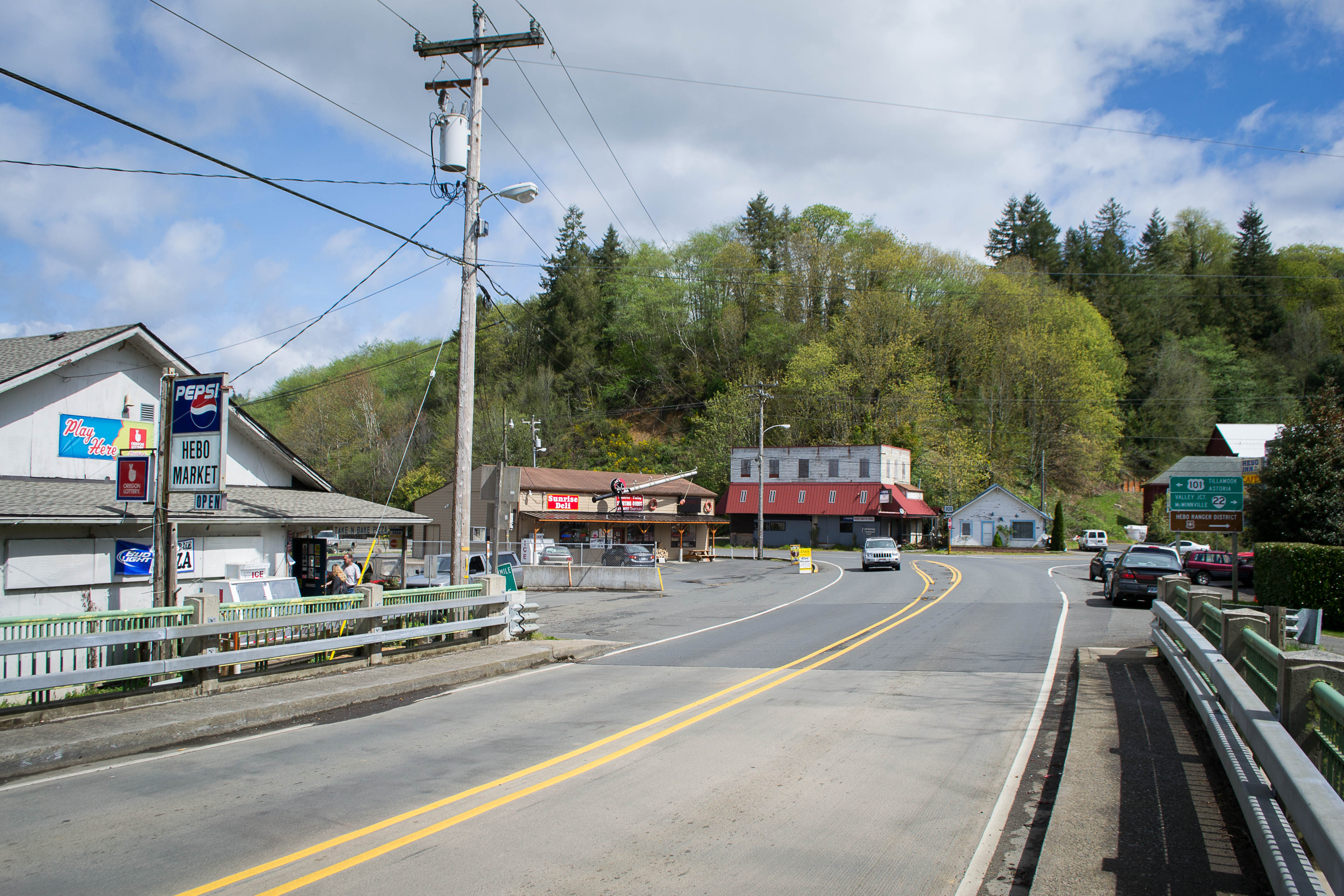

- Location of Hebo, Oregon
- Coordinates: 45°13′30″N 123°51′48″W
- Country: United States
- State: Oregon
- County: Tillamook

Area
  - Total: 1.63 sq mi (4.21 km^{2})
  - Land: 1.63 sq mi (4.21 km^{2})
  - Water: 0 sq mi (0.00 km^{2})
- Elevation: 72 ft (22 m)

Population (2020)
  - Total: 207
  - Density: 127.3/sq mi (49.15/km^{2})
- Time zone: UTC-8 (Pacific (PST))
  - Summer (DST): UTC-7 (PDT)
- ZIP code: 97122
- Area code: 503
- FIPS code: 41-33100
- GNIS feature ID: 2408369

Hebo is an unincorporated community in Tillamook County, Oregon, United States. For statistical purposes, the United States Census Bureau has defined Hebo as a census-designated place (CDP). As of the 2020 census, Hebo had a population of 207.

== Geography ==
According to the United States Census Bureau, the CDP has a total area of 1.6 square miles (4.1 km^{2}), all of it land.

== US Forest Service ==
The Hebo Ranger District is based in Hebo on Highway 22. It is the northern (and smaller) district for Siuslaw National Forest. Much of the land surrounding Hebo is public land managed by Siuslaw National Forest.

== Demographics ==
Historical population
Census	Pop.	Note	%±
2020	207		—
U.S. Decennial Census

As of the census of 2000, there were 231 people, 94 households, and 65 families residing in the CDP. The population density was 141.8 people per square mile (54.7 people/km^{2}). There were 123 housing units at an average density of 75.5 per square mile (29.2/km^{2}). The racial makeup of the CDP was 90.91% White, 3.03% Native American, 3.90% from other races, and 2.16% from two or more races. Hispanic or Latino of any race were 5.63% of the population.

There were 94 households, out of which 23.4% had children under the age of 18 living with them, 56.4% were married couples living together, 7.4% had a female householder with no husband present, and 29.8% were non-families. 23.4% of all households were made up of individuals, and 7.4% had someone living alone who was 65 years of age or older. The average household size was 2.46 and the average family size was 2.79.

In the CDP, the population was spread out, with 22.9% under the age of 18, 7.4% from 18 to 24, 19.9% from 25 to 44, 34.6% from 45 to 64, and 15.2% who were 65 years of age or older. The median age was 44 years. For every 100 females, there were 104.4 males. For every 100 females age 18 and over, there were 100.0 males.

The median income for a household in the CDP was $37,250 and the median income for a family was $52,500. Males had a median income of $40,694 versus $21,250 for females. The per capita income for the CDP was $16,053. None of the families and 4.4% of the population were living below the poverty line, including no under-eighteens and 14.3% of those over 64.

== Education ==
It is in the Nestucca Valley School District 101J

The county is in the Tillamook Bay Community College district.

== See also ==
- Mount Hebo
- Mount Hebo Air Force Station
