= 689th Radar Squadron =

- Active: 1957-1979
- Country: United States
- Branch: United States Air Force
- Role: Radar Surveillance
- Motto(s): Semper Vigilans Latin Always Vigilant
- Decorations: Air Force Outstanding Unit Award

Insignia
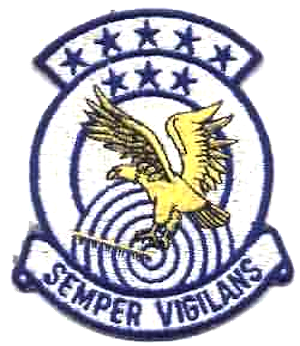
- 689th Radar Squadron emblem (Note: Approved 4 September 1956.)

The 689th Radar Squadron is an inactive United States Air Force unit. It was last assigned to the 25th Air Division, stationed at Mount Hebo Air Force Station, Oregon. It was inactivated on 30 June 1979.

== History ==
The 689th Radar Squadron's long range radars (LRR) were part of the Air Force Semi-Automatic Ground Environment (SAGE) computer directed system for air defense. Available squadron electronic equipment was able to support the detection, identification, and destruction of enemy aircraft. This was accomplished by communications between the SAGE computer at McChord Air Force Base, the radars and communications systems at Mount Hebo Air Force Station, and airborne interceptor aircraft such as the supersonic Convair F-106 Delta Dart jet.

Radar systems operated and maintained by the 689th included the AN/FPS-24 search radar and the AN/FPS-26A and AN/FPS-90 height finder radars. The FPS-24 was housed in a 5 story tall (85 ft) building with two separate transmitters, a receiver, and special receiver equipment to provide counter measures against enemy jamming. In addition, the radar antenna was housed beneath a rigid radome about 145 ft in diameter and 100 ft tall. Three separate radomes were installed in the period from 1962 to 1965. All three were destroyed by high winds, the last in 1968. As a result, the FPS-24 was removed and a FPS-27 search radar requiring a much smaller radome was installed. Both height finder radar antennas were protected by smaller, inflatable radomes. Each height finder radar was installed in its own building. The FPS-26A radar was later modified beginning in 1967 to an FSS-7 Sea Launched Ballistic Missile detector. All three radar buildings were connected together so that 689th personnel could walk between them and the Operations building and be protected from adverse weather conditions.

The 689th Radar Squadron was originally assigned to the SAGE Portland Air Defense Sector at Adair Air Force Station, Oregon, a part of the 25th Air Division SAGE at McChord Air Force Base, Washington. Higher headquarters included 4th Air Force (Hamilton Air Force Base, California), and Air Defense Command (Peterson Air Force Base, Colorado). As the northernmost LRR site in the sector, the 689th was also able to feed its radar data to the Seattle Air Defense Sector, another adjacent unit of the 25th Air Division. When the sectorsS were absorbed into the 25th Air Division, the radars of the 689th and related units were connected to the computers there. In July 1967, Detachment 2 of the 14th Missile Warning Squadron was activated at Mt Hebo to operate a missile warning radar. Both squadrons are now inactive. The Air Force equipment and facilities at Mt Hebo have been removed and the site returned to its natural state. A plaque is virtually all that remains of the radar station. It is dedicated In Memory Of Those Who Served At Mt. Hebo AFS, Oregon. 689th Radar Sq., Oct.1956-June 1979. Det.2 14th MWS July 1967 - Sep.1980.

Squadron responsibilities included operation and maintenance of the installed radar and communications equipment, and various support activities including food service, supply, power production, civil engineering, administration, transportation, and personnel services. Available facilities included buildings for the radar and communications equipment, barracks for personnel, family housing, a power plant, dining hall, gym, motor pool, and administrative activities. The Squadron had all the functions and capabilities of a small town.

== Lineage ==
- Established as 689th Aircraft Control and Warning Squadron

Activated on 1 October 1953
Redesignated as 689th Radar Squadron (SAGE) on 15 July 1960
Redesignated as 689th Radar Squadron on 1 February 1974
Inactivated on 30 June 1979

=== Assignments ===
- 4704th Defense Wing, 1 October 1953
- 25th Air Division, 8 October 1954
- Portland Air Defense Sector, 1 March 1960
- 25th Air Division, 1 April 1966 – 30 June 1979

=== Stations ===
- Portland Air Force Base (later Portland International Airport), Oregon, 1 October 1953
- Mount Hebo Air Force Station, Oregon, 1 July 1956 – 30 June 1979
