= Blaine Air Force Station =

Closed United States Air Force General Surveillance Radar station

Blaine Air Force Station
- Part of Air Defense Command (ADC)

Site information
- Type: Air Force Station
- Code: ADC ID: P-46, NORAD ID: Z-46
- Controlled by: United States Air Force

Location
- Location of Blaine AFS, Washington
- Coordinates: 48°54′48″N 122°44′04″W

Site history
- Built: 1951
- In use: 1951-1979

Garrison information
- Garrison: 757th Aircraft Control and Warning Squadron

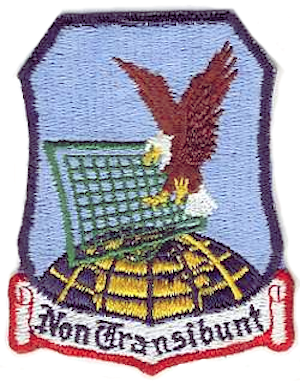
Emblem of the 757th Radar Squadron

Blaine Air Force Station is a closed United States Air Force General Surveillance Radar station. It is located 5.5 miles (8.9 km) south of Blaine, Washington. It was closed in 1979.

== History ==
Blaine Air Force Station was one of twenty-eight stations built as part of the second segment of the Air Defense Command permanent radar network. Prompted by the start of the Korean War, on 11 July 1950, the Secretary of the Air Force asked the Secretary of Defense for approval to expedite construction of the permanent network. Receiving the Defense Secretary's approval on 21 July, the Air Force directed the Corps of Engineers to proceed with construction.

The 757th Aircraft Control and Warning Squadron (AC&W Sq) was assigned to Birch Bay AFS, Washington on 27 November 1950. The 757th AC&W Sq began operating a pair of AN/FPS-10 radars in January 1952, and initially the station functioned as a Ground-Control Intercept (GCI) and warning station. As a GCI station, the squadron's role was to guide interceptor aircraft toward unidentified intruders picked up on the unit's radar scopes.

The site was renamed Blaine Air Force Station on 1 December 1953. In 1959 Blaine AFS switched to operating an AN/FPS-20 search radar and AN/FPS-6 and AN/FPS-6A height-finder radars.

During 1960 Blaine AFS joined the Semi Automatic Ground Environment (SAGE) system, feeding data to DC-12 at McChord AFB, Washington. After joining, the squadron was re-designated as the 757th Radar Squadron (SAGE) on 1 April 1960. The radar squadron provided information 24/7 the SAGE Direction Center where it was analyzed to determine range, direction altitude speed and whether or not aircraft were friendly or hostile. By 1963 the station had converted to an AN/FPS-24 search radar, and had received an AN/FPS-26A height-finder radar which replaced the AN/FPS-6. On 31 July 1963, the site was redesignated as NORAD ID Z-46.

In addition to the main facility, Blaine operated an AN/FPS-14 Gap Filler site:

- Anacortes, WA (P-46A) 48°27′15″N 122°37′33″W

Over the years, the equipment at the station was upgraded or modified to improve the efficiency and accuracy of the information gathered by the radars. The 757th Radar Squadron was inactivated on 30 March 1979 as part of the inactivation of Air Defense Command and the general draw down of air defense radar stations. Today, much of Blaine AFS remains intact, the station however is scheduled for redevelopment and is to be "Bay Horizon Park". The park will be a camp, conference and recreation center. It is unclear which parts of the former Air Force Station will remain and which parts will be torn down.

The Ground-to-Air Transmitter-Receiver (GATR) facility was located off-station roughly 3 miles east of the main station.

== Air Force units and assignments ==
=== Units ===
757th Aircraft Control and Warning Squadron

- constituted as the 757th Aircraft Control and Warning Squadron on 14 November 1950

Activated at Paine Field, Washington on 27 November 1950
Moved to Birch Bay, WA on 15 August 1951
Site renamed Blaine Air Force Station on 1 December 1953
Redesignated 757th Radar Squadron (SAGE) on 1 April 1960
Redesignated 757th Radar Squadron on 1 February 1974
Inactivated on 30 March 1979

=== Assignments ===
- 505th Aircraft Control and Warning Group, 15 August 1951
- 25th Air Division, 6 February 1952
- 4704th Defense Wing, 1 January 1953
- 25th Air Division, 8 October 1954
- Seattle Air Defense Sector, 1 March 1960
- 25th Air Division, 1 April 1966 – 30 March 1979

== See also ==
- List of USAF Aerospace Defense Command General Surveillance Radar Stations
