= 917th Aircraft Control and Warning Squadron =

- Active: 1952-1963
- Country: United States
- Branch: United States Air Force
- Type: General Radar Surveillance

The 917th Aircraft Control and Warning Squadron is an inactive United States Air Force unit. It was last assigned to the Seattle Air Defense Sector, Air Defense Command, stationed at Puntzi Mountain Air Force Station, British Columbia. It was inactivated on 1 February 1963.

The unit was a General Surveillance Radar squadron providing for the air defense of North America.

Lineage

- Activated as 917th Aircraft Control and Warning Squadron, 16 April 1952

Discontinued, 1 February 1963

Assignments

- Western Air Defense Force, 16 April 1952
- 25th Air Division, 1 January 1953
- Seattle Air Defense Sector, 1 March 1960 – 1 February 1963

Stations

- Geiger Field, Washington, 16 April 1952
- Puntzi Mountain AS, British Columbia, 8 November 1952 – 1 February 1963
