= Naselle Air Force Station =

Closed United States Air Force General Surveillance Radar station

Naselle Air Force Station
- Part of Air Defense Command (ADC)

Site information
- Type: Air Force Station
- Controlled by: United States Air Force

Location
- Location of Naselle AFS, Washington
- Coordinates: 46°25′19″N 123°47′53″W

Site history
- Built: 1950
- In use: 1950–1966

Garrison information
- Garrison: 759th Aircraft Control and Warning Squadron

Naselle Air Force Station (ADC ID: P-57, NORAD ID: Z-57) is a closed United States Air Force General Surveillance Radar station. It is located 3.9 miles (6.3 km) north of Naselle, Washington. It was decommissioned by the Air Force in 1966 and later used for commercial and recreational uses.

== History ==
Naselle Air Force Station was one of twenty-eight stations built as part of the second segment of the Air Defense Command permanent radar network. Prompted by the start of the Korean War, on 11 July 1950, the Secretary of the Air Force asked the Secretary of Defense for approval to expedite construction of the permanent network. Receiving the Defense Secretary's approval on 21 July, the Air Force directed the Corps of Engineers to proceed with construction at the site. The radars being located on a mountain peak about 4 miles north of Naselle, Washington; the station and support facilities being located at the base of the mountain. Some of the original buildings still stand and are part of Naselle Youth Camp, a state operated forestry camp for juvenile inmates.

The 759th Aircraft Control and Warning Squadron (AC&W Sq) was assigned to Naselle AFS on 27 November 1950. The squadron began operating AN/FPS-3 long-range search and AN/FPS-5 height-finder radars, which allowed for the closing of the temporary Lashup Radar Network sites at Fort Stevens, Oregon (L-36), and Pacific Beach, Washington (L-35), which had been operated beginning in September 1950. Initially the station functioned as a Ground-Control Intercept (GCI) and warning station. As a GCI station, the squadron's role was to guide interceptor aircraft toward unidentified intruders picked up on the unit's radar scopes.

In 1955 an AN/FPS-8 search radar was placed on the site, and subsequently converted to and redesignated as an AN/GPS-3. In 1958 the 759th AC&W Sq began operating an AN/FPS-20 search radar, as well as AN/FPS-6 and AN/FPS-6A height-finder radars. In 1962 the AN/FPS-20 was upgraded to become an AN/FPS-67 radar.

In February 1960 Naselle AFS joined the Semi Automatic Ground Environment (SAGE) system, feeding data to DC-12 at McChord AFB, Washington. After joining, the squadron was redesignated as the 759th Radar Squadron (SAGE) on 1 April. The radar squadron provided information 24/7 the SAGE Direction Center where it was analyzed to determine range, direction altitude speed and whether or not aircraft were friendly or hostile. On 31 July 1963, the site was redesignated as NORAD ID Z-57. In 1965 an AN/FPS-26A height-finder was added to the site. The AN/FPS-6A was retired in early 1966.

Naselle Air Force Station was closed on 30 June 1966 due to budget reductions, and the squadron was inactivated. The radar site is a commercial transmitter site. The original Air Force station facilities (Lashup site) have been incorporated into the Fort Stevens Historic Site, the latter converted into Washington State operated Naselle Youth Camp.

== Air Force units and assignments ==
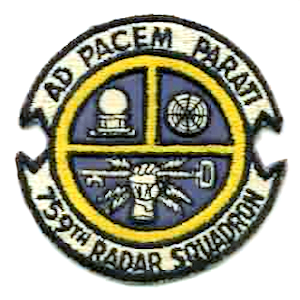
Emblem of the 759th Radar Squadron

=== Units ===
- Constituted as the 759th Aircraft Control and Warning Squadron on 15 November 1950

Activated at Naselle AFS on 27 November 1950
Redesignated 759th Radar Squadron on 1 April 1960
Inactivated on 25 June 1966

=== Assignments ===
- 505th Aircraft Control and Warning Group, 1 January 1951
- 25th Air Division, 6 February 1952
- 4704th Defense Wing, 1 January 1953
- 25th Air Division, 8 October 1954
- Seattle Air Defense Sector, 1 March 1960
- 25th Air Division, 1 April – 25 June 1966

== See also ==
- United States general surveillance radar stations
