= 918th Aircraft Control and Warning Squadron =

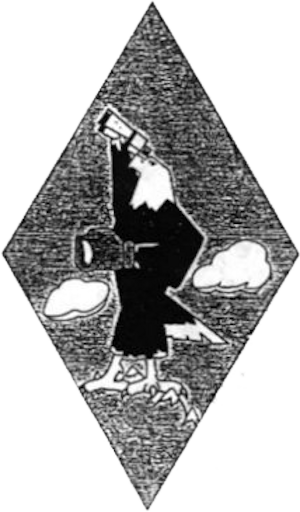
- Emblem of the 918th Aircraft Control and Warning Squadron
- Active: 1952-1963
- Country: United States
- Branch: United States Air Force
- Type: General Radar Surveillance

The 918th Aircraft Control and Warning Squadron is an inactive United States Air Force unit. It was last assigned to the Seattle Air Defense Sector, Air Defense Command, stationed at Baldy Hughes Air Station, British Columbia, Canada. It was inactivated on 1 March 1963.

The unit was a General Surveillance Radar squadron providing for the air defense of North America.

== Lineage ==
- Constituted as 918th Aircraft Control and Warning Squadron

Activated on 16 April 1952
Discontinued and inactivated on 1 March 1963

== Assignments ==
- Western Air Defense Force, 16 April 1952
- 25th Air Division, 16 February 1953
- Seattle Air Defense Sector, 1 March 1960 - 1 March 1963

== Stations ==
- Geiger Field, Washington, 16 April 1952
- Baldy Hughes Air Station, British Columbia, Canada, 1 June 1953 - 1 March 1963
