= 635th Radar Squadron =

- Active: 1947–1963; 1973–1974
- Country: United States
- Branch: United States Air Force
- Role: Air defense radar surveillance
- Motto(s): Guardians of the Gulf (1973-1974)

Insignia
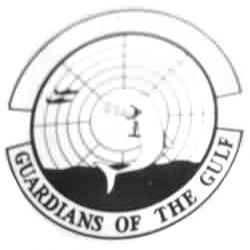
- 635th Radar Squadron emblem

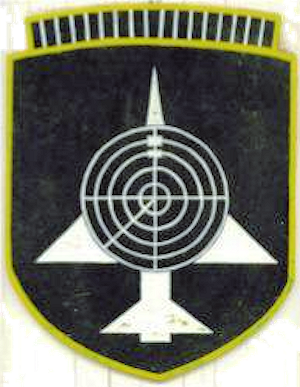
- 635th Aircraft Control & Warning Squadron emblem

The 635th Radar Squadron is an inactive United States Air Force unit. It was last assigned to the 20th Air Division, Aerospace Defense Command, stationed at Dauphin Island Air Force Station, Alabama. It was inactivated on 1 July 1974. The unit was a General Surveillance Radar squadron providing for the air defense of the United States.

== History ==
The squadron was first activated as an Aircraft Control and Warning Squadron (AC&W Sq) in 1947 at McChord Field, WA with a mission to detect and warn of aircraft and defend an area to the west of the Cascade Mountains. To accomplish its mission, it had detachments at Arlington, WA (WW II Site F-50), Neah Bay, WA (Det E, WW II Site J-55), Bellingham, WA, Spokane AFB, WA (WW II 4 AF Site 129), Coleville, WA, Pacific Beach, WA (Det D, WW II Site B-61, Lashup Site L-35), Sequim, WA (Det F), Everett, WA (Det B, Lashup Site L-31) and Fort Stevens, OR (Lashup Site L-36, Det C), located on World War II Sites. Its main search radar to perform this mission at this time was the AN/CPS-5. In the early 1950s, most of its detachments were replaced by separate squadrons. The squadron moved to Fort Lawton, WA in 1960. It joined the Semi Automatic Ground Environment (SAGE) system and was redesignated as a Radar Squadron in 1960. It was inactivated in 1963.

The Squadron was activated again in 1973 to replace Operating Location G of the 630th Radar Squadron at Dauphin Island AFS as part of the Southern Air Defense System (SADS). SADS had been established because of the inadequacy of the radar coverage to the south of the United States that had been dramatically illustrated whan a Cuban MiG-17 went undetected before it landed at Homestead AFB, and two years later, an An-24 similarly arrived unannounced at New Orleans International Airport. As a result, ADC established SADS with the squadron operating a manual control center at the Houston ARTCC and added radars to supplement the existing Federal Aviation Administration coverage in the area. However, the squadron was inactivated little more than a year later.

== Lineage ==
- Constituted as the 635th Aircraft Control and Warning Squadron

Activated 21 May 1947
Redesignated 635th Radar Squadron (SAGE) on 11 June 1960
Inactivated on 1 August 1963
Redesignated 635th Radar Squadron
Activated 1 January 1973
Inactivated 1 July 1974

=== Assignments ===
- 505th Aircraft Control and Warning Group, 21 May 1947
- 25th Air Division, 6 February 1952
- 4704th Defense Wing, 1 January 1953
- 25th Air Division, 8 October 1954
- Seattle Air Defense Sector, 1 March 1960 - 1 August 1963
- 20th Air Division, 1 January 1973– 1 July 1974

=== Stations ===
- McChord Field (later McChord Air Force Base), Washington, 21 May 1947
- Paine Field, Washington, 26 September 1948
- McChord Air Force Base, Washington, 22 September 1950
- Fort Lawton, Washington, 15 May 1960
- Dauphin Island Air Force Station, Alabama, 1 January 1973 – 1 July 1974

== See also ==
- List of United States Air Force aircraft control and warning squadrons
