= CFS Baldy Hughes =

Radar station in British Columbia, Canada 1953–1988

- Location of Canadian Forces Station Baldy Hughes, British Columbia

Site information
- Type: Radar Station
- Controlled by: Royal Canadian Air Force

Location
- Coordinates: 53°37′06″N 122°56′08″W

Site history
- Built: 1953
- In use: 1953-1988

Station badge

Canadian Forces Station Baldy Hughes (ADC ID: C-20) is a closed General Surveillance Radar station. It is located 22.3 miles (35.9 km) south-southwest of Prince George, British Columbia. It was closed in 1988.

It was operated as part of the Pinetree Line network controlled by NORAD.

== History ==
As a result of the Cold War and with the expansion of a North American continental air defence system, The site at Baldy Hughes was selected as a site for a United States Air Force (USAF) radar station, one of the many that would make up the Pinetree Line of Ground-Control Intercept (GCI) radar sites. Construction on the base began in 1952 and was completed in 1953.

The base was manned by members of the USAF's Air Defense Command (ADC) 918th Aircraft Control and Warning Squadron, being known as Baldy Hughes Air Station. In June 1953, operations began at the unit's permanent home. The station was equipped with AN/FPS-3C, AN/FPS-502, AN/FPS-20A; AN/TPS-502, and AN/FPS-6B radars.

As a GCI base, the 918th's role was to guide interceptor aircraft toward unidentified intruders picked up on the unit's radar scopes. These interceptors were based at the 25th Air Division at McChord Air Force Base in Washington.

In the early 1960s, the USAF relinquished control of the base to the Royal Canadian Air Force (RCAF). This was part of an arrangement with the United States that came as a result of the cancellation of the Avro Arrow. Canada would lease 66 F-101 Voodoo fighters and take over operation of 12 Pinetree radar bases.

Upon hand-over on 1 March 1963, the operating unit Became No. 54 Aircraft Control & Warning Squadron and the base became RCAF Station Baldy Hughes. Radar operations at 54 Squadron were automated on 1 June 1966 by the Semi Automatic Ground Environment (SAGE) system, and the station became a long-range radar site. It would no longer guide interceptors but only look for enemy aircraft, feeding data to the Seattle Air Defense Sector SAGE DC-12 Direction Center of the 25th NORAD Region at McChord AFB, Washington. Radars at the station were also upgraded to the following equipment:

- Search Radars: AN/FPS-3C, AN/FPS-27
- Height Radars: AN/FPS-502, AN/FPS-20A,AN/FPS-6B, AN/FPS-26

As a result of the unification of the Canadian Forces in 1968, the new Canadian Forces organization absorbed the RCAF, RCN and the Canadian Army. 48 Radar Squadron, RCAF Station Baldy Hughes, became simply Canadian Forces Station (CFS) Baldy Hughes in 1967.

The station began reporting to the Canada West ROCC in 1983. It was closed in 1988. Today the former station is The Baldy Hughes Addiction Treatment Centre.

== See also ==
- List of Royal Canadian Air Force stations
- List of USAF Aerospace Defense Command General Surveillance Radar Stations
