= Western Air Defense Force =

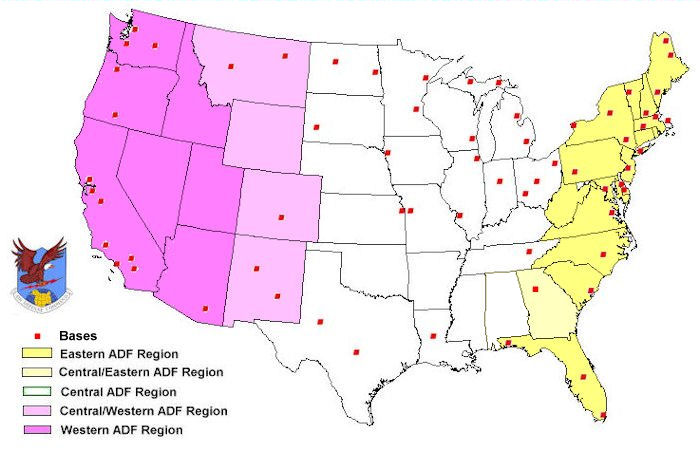
- Regions of ADC Air Defense Forces and known Air Force Bases with ADC units, 1949–1960 Note: States containing ADC bases of Western & Central ADF and Eastern & Central ADF identified as Central/Western and Central/Eastern
- Active: 1949–1960
- Country: United States
- Branch: United States Air Force
- Role: Air Defense
- Part of: Air Defense Command

The Western Air Defense Force (WADF) is an inactive United States Air Force organization. Its last assignment was with Air Defense Command being stationed at Hamilton Air Force Base, California. It was inactivated on 1 July 1960.

== History ==
WADF was an intermediate-level command and control organization of Air Defense Command. Its origins date to 1 March 1949 when Continental Air Command (ConAC) reorganized Air Defense Command when it became an operating agency. Air defense units within the Continental United States (CONUS) were given to the Eastern and Western Air Defense Liaison Groups, with Western and Eastern Air Defense Forces activated on 1 September 1949.

The command was originally assigned the region within the Continental United States (CONUS) to the west of the 102d degree of longitude, from the Canada–US border in the north to the Rio Grande border between the United States and Mexico in the south and west to the Pacific Ocean coastline. This was adjusted in 1951 with the activation of Central Air Defense Force (CADF) with the region being adjusted slightly to the west to the border of Montana and North Dakota at the Canada–US border, south along the eastern borders of Montana, Wyoming, Colorado and New Mexico to the Mexico–US border. Organizations stationed east of that boundary were transferred to CADF.

The delineation was again adjusted in March 1956 to the region generally to the west of the 114th degree of longitude, roughly along the eastern borders of Idaho, Nevada and California from the Canada–US border in the north to the Mexico–US border in the south. Organizations stationed east of that boundary were transferred to CADF, whose region was shifted westward.

Western Air Defense Force was inactivated on 1 July 1960, with its assigned units reassigned either to 25th or 28th Air Divisions, or to the new Air Defense Sectors created with the advent of the Semi Automatic Ground Environment (SAGE) system.

=== Lineage ===
- Established as Western Air Defense Force and organized 1 September 1949.

Discontinued 1 July 1960

=== Assignments ===
- Continental Air Command, 1 September 1949 – 1 January 1951
- Air Defense Command, 1 January 1951 – 1 July 1960

=== Stations ===
- Hamilton AFB, California, 1 September 1949 – 1 July 1960

=== Components ===
==== Air Divisions ====
- 8th Air Division (AEW&Con)

Stationed at McClellan AFB, California
Activated by Western Air Defense Force, 1 May 1954
Re-assigned to Air Defense Command, 1 May 1955

- 9th Air Division (Defense)

Stationed at Geiger Field, Washington
Activated by Western Air Defense Force, 8 October 1954
Inactivated on 15 August 1958

- 25th Air Division

Stationed at Silver Lake, near Lake Stickney, Washington
Re-assigned to Western Air Defense Force from Fourth Air Force, 1 February 1950
Moved to McChord AFB, Washington, 15 September 1951
Re-designated 25th Air Division (SAGE), 1 March 1959
Re-assigned to Air Defense Command, 1 July 1960

- 27th Air Division (Defense)

Stationed at Norton AFB, California
Activated by Western Air Defense Force, 20 September 1950
Inactivated on 1 October 1959

- 28th Air Division (Defense)

Stationed at Hamilton AFB, California
Activated by Western Air Defense Force, 1 January 1951
Re-designated 28th Air Division (SAGE), 1 July 1960
Re-assigned to Air Defense Command, 1 July 1960

- 29th Air Division

Stationed at Great Falls AFB, Montana
Activated by Western Air Defense Force, 1 March 1951
Great Falls AFB renamed Malmstrom AFB, Montana, 1 October 1955
Re-designated 29th Air Division (SAGE), 1 July 1960
Re-assigned to Air Defense Command, 1 July 1960

- 34th Air Division (Defense)

Assigned to Kirtland AFB, New Mexico
Activated by Western Air Defense Force, 5 January 1951
Re-assigned to Central Air Defense Force (CADF), 15 February 1953

==== Air Defense Sectors ====
- Los Angeles Air Defense Sector

Stationed at Norton AFB, California
Re-assigned to Western Air Defense Force from 27th Air Division, 1 October 1959
Re-assigned to 28th Air Division, 1 July 1960

- Phoenix Air Defense Sector

Stationed at Luke AFB, Arizona
Activated by Western Air Defense Force, 15 June 1959
Re-assigned to 28th Air Division, 1 July 1960

==== Wings ====
- 1st Fighter-Interceptor Wing

Stationed at George AFB, California
Re-assigned to Western Air Defense Force, 1 January 1951
Inactivated 6 February 1952

- 78th Fighter-Interceptor Wing

Stationed at Hamilton AFB, California
Re-assigned to Western Air Defense Force, 1 January 1951
Inactivated 6 February 1952

- 81st Fighter-Interceptor Wing

Stationed at Larson AFB, Washington
Re-assigned to Western Air Defense Force, 1 January 1951
Re-assigned to Third Air Force (USAFE), 22 August 1951

- 101st Fighter-Interceptor Wing

Federalized Maine Air National Guard
Stationed at Larson AFB, Washington
Re-assigned to Western Air Defense Force from Eastern Air Defense Force (EADF), 2 August 1951
Inactivated and returned to state control, 6 February 1952

- 142d Fighter-Interceptor Wing

Federalized Oregon Air National Guard, 2 March 1951
Stationed at Geiger Field, Washington
Re-assigned to Eastern Air Defense Force (EADF), 11 April 1951

- 325th Fighter-Interceptor Wing

Stationed at McChord AFB, Washington
Re-assigned to Western Air Defense Force from Air Defense Command, 1 May 1951
Inactivated 6 February 1952

- 552d Airborne Early Warning and Control Wing

Stationed at McClellan AFB, California
Re-assigned to Western Air Defense Force from 8th Air Division (AEW&Con), 1 July 1957
Re-assigned to 28th Air Division, 1 July 1960

- 4702d Defense Wing

Stationed at Hamilton AFB, California
Activated by Western Air Defense Force, 1 February 1952
Re-assigned to 25th Air Division, 1 November 1952

- 4703d Defense Wing

Stationed at Larson AFB, Washington
Activated by Western Air Defense Force, 1 February 1952
Discontinued 7 April 1952

- 4704th Defense Wing

Stationed at McChord AFB, Washington
Activated by Western Air Defense Force, 1 February 1952
Re-assigned to 25th Air Division, 1 December 1952

- 4705th Defense Wing

Stationed at Norton AFB, California
Activated by Western Air Defense Force, 1 February 1952
Discontinued 1 March 1952

- 4750th Training Wing (Air Defense)

Stationed at Yuma County Airport, Arizona
Activated by Western Air Defense Force, 1 September 1953
Re-assigned to Air Defense Command, 1 October 1953

==== Groups ====
- 162d Aircraft Control and Warning Group

Federalized Washington Air National Guard, 12 May 1951
Assigned to Larson AFB, Washington
Re-assigned to 25th Air Division, 25 June 1951

==== Squadrons ====
- 115th Aircraft Control and Warning Squadron

Federalized Alabama Air National Guard, 20 January 1952
Assigned to Geiger Field, Washington
Assigned to WADF, 17 March 1952 – 16 February 1953

- 917th Aircraft Control and Warning Squadron

Assigned to Puntzi Mountain AS, British Columbia
Assigned to WADF, 16 April 1952 – 1 January 1953

- 918th Aircraft Control and Warning Squadron

Assigned to Baldy Hughes AS, British Columbia
Assigned to WADF, 16 April 1952 – 16 February 1953

- 919th Aircraft Control and Warning Squadron

Assigned to Saskatoon Mountain AS, Alberta
Assigned to WADF, 16 April 1952 – 16 February 1953

== See also ==
- Eastern Air Defense Force
- Central Air Defense Force
