= Mount Hebo Air Force Station =

Former US Air Force radar station

Mount Hebo Air Force Station
- Part of Air Defense Command (ADC)

Site information
- Type: Air Force Station
- Controlled by: United States Air Force

Location
- Location of Mount Hebo AFS, Oregon
- Coordinates: 45°12′57″N 123°45′28″W

Site history
- Built: 1957
- In use: 1957-1979

Garrison information
- Garrison: 689th Aircraft Control and Warning Squadron

Mount Hebo Air Force Station (ADC ID: M-100, NORAD ID: Z-100) is a closed United States Air Force General Surveillance Radar station. It is located 5.2 miles (8.4 km) east-southeast of Hebo, Oregon, at the top of 3,154-foot (961 m) Mount Hebo. It was closed in 1980.

== Facilities ==
The station was 10 miles (16 km) from the Pacific Ocean and some 8.4 kilometres (5.2 mi) east of the coastal community of Hebo. Due to local orographic lift of the predominant westerly Pacific airflow, Mount Hebo is often rainy, windy, cold, and snowy. Three giant Air Force radomes, about 140 feet (43 m) in diameter and 100 feet (30 m) high, were destroyed by the elements: the first was constructed in 1962 and was destroyed by high winds during the Columbus Day Storm on 12 Oct 1962 while yet incomplete; the second was built in 1963 and was destroyed by lightning and high winds in Jan 1964; the third was a different design and constructed in 1965, but it eventually succumbed to the winds in 1968. The top of Mount Hebo is usually under a few feet of snow during the winter.

Mount Hebo Air Force Station was a vital part of the Air Force Semi Automatic Ground Environment (SAGE) computer supported system for air defense. Available electronic equipment was able to support the detection, identification and destruction of enemy aircraft. This was accomplished by communications between the SAGE computers at Adair Air Force Station in Oregon and McChord Air Force Base in Washington, the radar and communications systems at Mount Hebo, and interceptor aircraft such as the supersonic F-106 Delta Dart.

Primary radar systems at Mt Hebo AFS included the FPS-24 search radar, and the FPS-26A and FPS-90 height finder radars. The FPS-26A was modified between 1967 and 1970 into the FSS-7 Sea launched ballistic Missile (SLBM) sensor and tracking radar. When the third FPS-24 radome was destroyed in 1968, the FPS-24 was replaced by an FPS-27 search radar with a smaller radar antenna and radome. Connectivity to the SAGE system was through the FST-2B. Ground to air radio communications were provided in two ways. First was digital data sent to the aircraft (F-106) via the GKA-5 digital data link system's modified GRT-3 UHF radio. Second was voice communications using the sites analog single channel GRT-3 transmitters, GRR-7 receivers and GRC-27 multi-channel (transmit and receive capable) UHF radios. All radio equipment was located at the Ground-to-Air Transmitter Receiver (GATR) site. The largest building on the radar site was the 64-foot-square (20 m), 85-foot-tall (26 m) FPS-24 radar tower. Surrounding this tower was a Radome Support Structure with a 140-foot-diameter (43 m), 96-foot-tall (29 m) radome to protect the 85.5-ton FPS-24 antenna from snow, ice, and high winds.

In addition to the main facility, Mount Hebo operated several AN/FPS-14 Gap Filler sites:

- Washougal, WA (M-100A) 45°43′02″N 122°17′46″W
- Philomath, OR (M-100B) 44°30′15″N 123°33′10″W

Supporting infrastructure at the Mt Hebo AFS included 27 family homes in a housing area about 2.5 miles below the main site. A Ground-to-Air Radio site was about 3 miles to the east on Little Hebo. A paved access road led from the town of Hebo and climbed over 3000 feet in 8.5 miles with many curves and steep sections. Separate water systems were provided for the main site and the housing area. Separate sewer systems supported the main site, housing area, and GATR site. A power station with four 1000 kW diesel driven generators was available. Storage tanks were available for water at the main site and housing area. Diesel fuel storage tanks were available on the main site.

Special purpose vehicles were assigned to support Mt Hebo AFS. Two 4-wheel drive 40 passenger buses were used primarily for taking children to and from schools in Hebo and Cloverdale. An ambulance was available for emergencies. For winter weather conditions there was an arctic snow weasel with tracks, a towable 100 gallon water tank, a snow blower, 2 snow plows, a front end loader, and a road grader.

== Personnel ==
Mount Hebo was the home of the 689th Radar Squadron. Squadron responsibilities included operation and maintenance of the installed radar and communications equipment, and various support activities including food service, supply, power production, civil engineering, administration, transportation and personnel services. Available facilities included buildings for the radar and communications, barracks for personnel, family housing, a power plant, dining hall, gym, motor pool, and support activities. The radar station was like a small town.

The 689th Radar Squadron was originally assigned to the SAGE Portland Air Defense Sector. Later it was realigned with the 25th Air Division SAGE at McChord AFB. Higher headquarters included the Fourth Air Force and Air Defense Command. Later, Detachment 2 of the 14th Missile Warning Squadron was activated at Mount Hebo to operate missile-warning radar.

== Deactivation ==
Between 1954 and 1972, 196 acres (0.79 km^{2}) of land were acquired by the Air Force from private parties, the United States Forest Service (USFS), and the General Services Administration (GSA) for use as the Mount Hebo aircraft warning and control radar station. Between 1972 and 1987, the Air Force declared the property excess and the land was transferred to the GSA for disposal. The land is currently under the jurisdiction of the USFS (Siuslaw National Forest, Hebo Ranger District), U.S. Department of Energy, and private parties. Before its final disposal, the GSA contracted to demolish the Air Force buildings.

The Air Force equipment and facilities at Mount Hebo have been removed and the site returned to its natural state, except for an access road.

There is a memorial plaque for the organizations and personnel at the radar station. It reads

"In Memory of Those Who Served at Mount Hebo AFS, Oregon. 689th Radar Sq., Oct. 1956 – June 1979. Det. 2 14th MWS July 1967 – Sep. 1980".

In addition, the Siuslaw National Forest (US Forest Service) unveiled an interpretive sign atop Mt Hebo on 8 Aug 2014. Former personnel assigned to Mt Hebo AFS attended and made comments. This sign is entitled SEARCHING THE SKIES MT. HEBO AIR FORCE STATION. This sign has text, photos, and a timeline from 1953 to 2000. The sign is positioned to overlook the present meadow where the radar towers were once located. Further details about this sign are found at the External Links for the Tillamook Headlight Herald (14 Aug 2014), and on the Online Air Defense Radar Museum - Radomes, Inc.

== See also ==
- List of USAF Aerospace Defense Command General Surveillance Radar Stations
