= AN/FPS-7 Radar =

AN/FPS-7
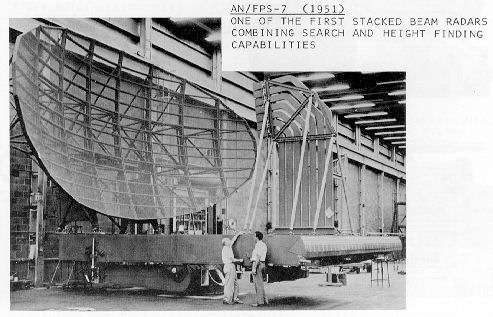
- General Electric AN/FPS-7 Radar
- Country of origin: United States
- Type: Long Range Search Radar
- Other names: AN/ECP-91 AN/FPS-107 (V1, V2)

The AN/FPS-7 Radar was a Long Range Search Radar used by the United States Air Force Air Defense Command.

In the mid-1950s General Electric developed a radar with a search altitude of 100,000 feet and a range of 270 miles. This radar was significant in that it was the first stacked-beam radar to enter into production in the United States. The antenna was fed signals from several feed horns arranged in a vertical stack, producing a series of horizontal beams separated vertically in space. By comparing the returns from the different feeds, altitude information could be determined without the need for a separate height-finder radar.

Designed to operate in the L-band at 1250 to 1350 MHz, the radar deployed in late 1959 and the early 1960s. The AN/FPS-7 was used for both air defense and air traffic control in New York, Kansas City, Houston, Spokane, San Antonio, and elsewhere.

In the early 1960s a modification called AN/ECP-91 was installed to improve its electronic countermeasure (ECM) capability. About thirty units were produced. Another modification was the AN/FPS-107 which also operated in the L-Band which was manufactured by Westinghouse.

In accordance with the Joint Electronics Type Designation System (JETDS), the "AN/FPS-7" designation represents the 7th design of an Army-Navy electronic device for fixed ground search radar. The JETDS system also now is used to name all Department of Defense electronic systems.

== See also ==
- List of radars
- List of military electronics of the United States
