= 317th Fighter-Interceptor Squadron =

317th Fighter Interceptor Squadron
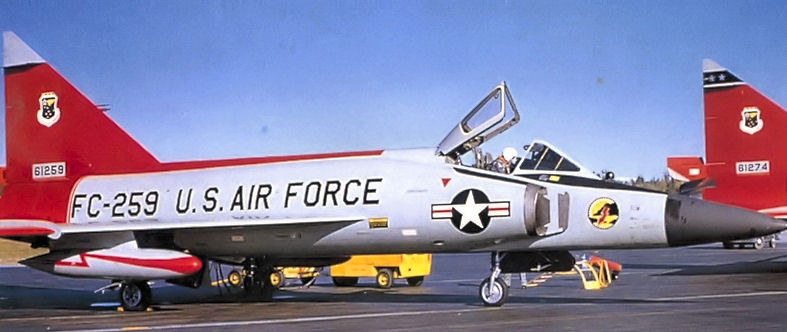
- 317th Fighter-Interceptor Squadron F-102 Delta Dagger (Note: Aircraft is Convair F-102A-70-CO Delta Dagger serial 56-1259)
- Active: 1942–1945; 1947–1969
- Country: United States
- Branch: United States Air Force
- Role: Interceptor
- Part of: Aerospace Defense Command
- Motto: '
- Engagements: Mediterranean Theater of Operations
- Decorations: Distinguished Unit Citation; Air Force Outstanding Unit Award

Insignia
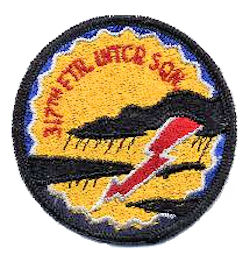
- Patch with the 317th Fighter-Interceptor Squadron emblem (Note: Approved 13 December 1951.)

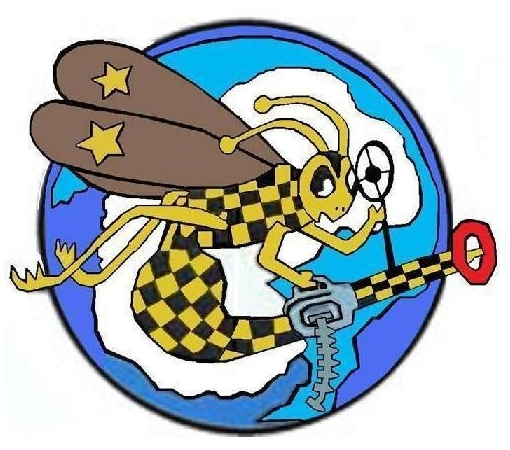
- 317th Fighter Squadron emblem

The 317th Fighter Interceptor Squadron is an inactive United States Air Force unit, last assigned to Aerospace Defense Command, at Elmendorf Air Force Base, Alaska, where it was inactivated on 31 December 1969.

The squadron was first activated as the 317th Fighter Squadron during World War II. After training in the United States, it deployed to North Africa. In combat operations in the Mediterranean Theater of Operations. It was withdrawn from combat from September to December 1943 while it equipped with different aircraft and moved from Africa to Italy. It earned two Distinguished Unit Citations before returning to the United States for inactivation.

The squadron returned to service as an air defense unit in 1947, serving in that role until inactivated in 1969.

== History ==
=== World War II ===
The squadron was first organized at Mitchel Field, New York on 3 August 1942 as one of the three original squadrons of the 325th Fighter Group, but moved the same day to Hillsgrove Army Air Field, Rhode Island. It equipped with Curtiss P-40 Warhawks and trained for combat at Hillsgrove until late January 1943, when it began to deploy overseas.

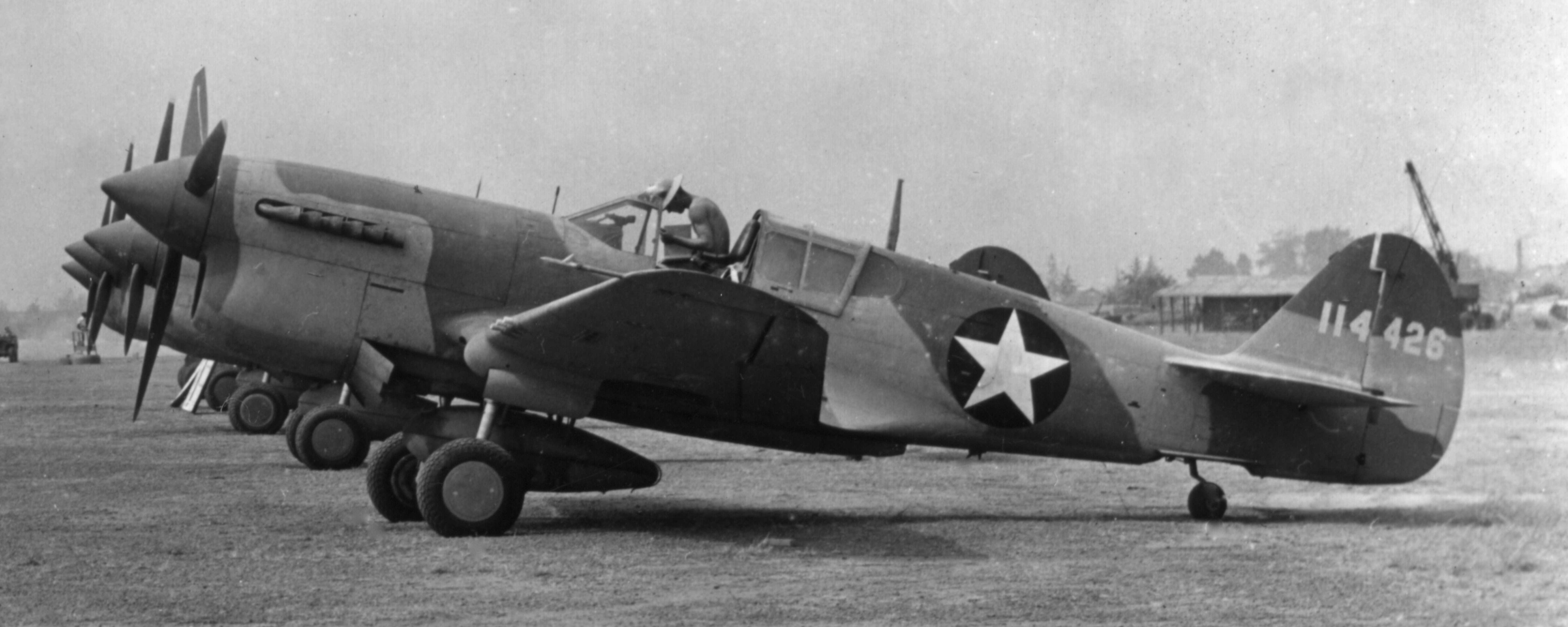
P-40s at Tafaraoui Airfield

The squadron arrived in the Mediterranean Theater of Operations in February and was established at its first combat station, Tafaraoui Airfield, Algeria by 28 February 1943. It flew its first combat mission on 17 April. It escorted medium bombers. It flew strafing missions and flew sweeps over the Mediterranean Sea from bases in Algeria and Tunisia. The squadron participated in the defeat of Axis forces in Tunisia. It participated in the reduction of Pantelleria and in Operation Husky, the invasion and conquest of Sicily. On 30 July, the 325th Group used diversionary tactics to lure a superior number of enemy planes into the air over Sardinia, destroying more than half of them. The squadron was awarded its first Distinguished Unit Citation for this action. In late September 1943, the squadron was withdrawn from combat to convert to Republic P-47 Thunderbolts and prepare to move to the Italian peninsula.

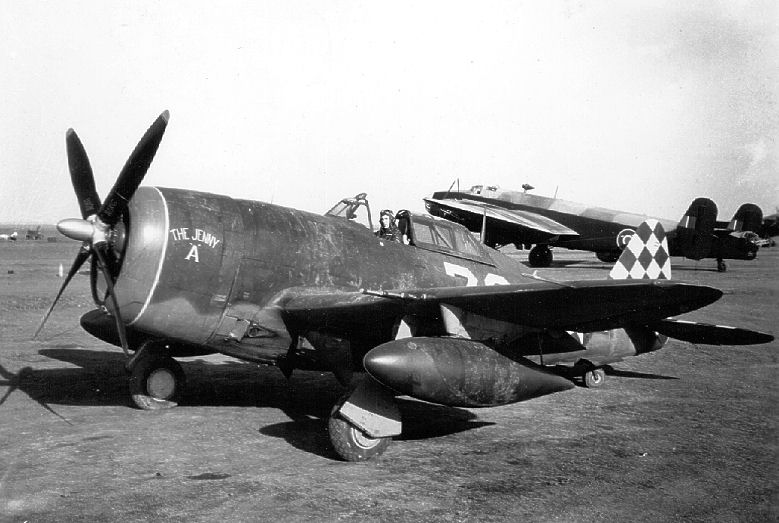
Squadron P-47

By early December 1943, the squadron began to operate its Thunderbolts from Foggia Airfield, Italy, flying its first mission with the new plane on 14 December. However, it only operated the P-47 for a short period, converting to North American P-51 Mustangs in March 1944, and moving to Lesina Airfield, Italy on the 29th of the month. However, on 30 January it flew its "T-Bolts" more than 300 miles at very low altitude to make a surprise attack on German interceptors defending airdromes near Villorba. The severe losses it inflicted on the defending forces enabled heavy bombers to attack vital targets in the area without encountering serious opposition. This action resulted in the second award of the Distinguished Unit Citation to the squadron.

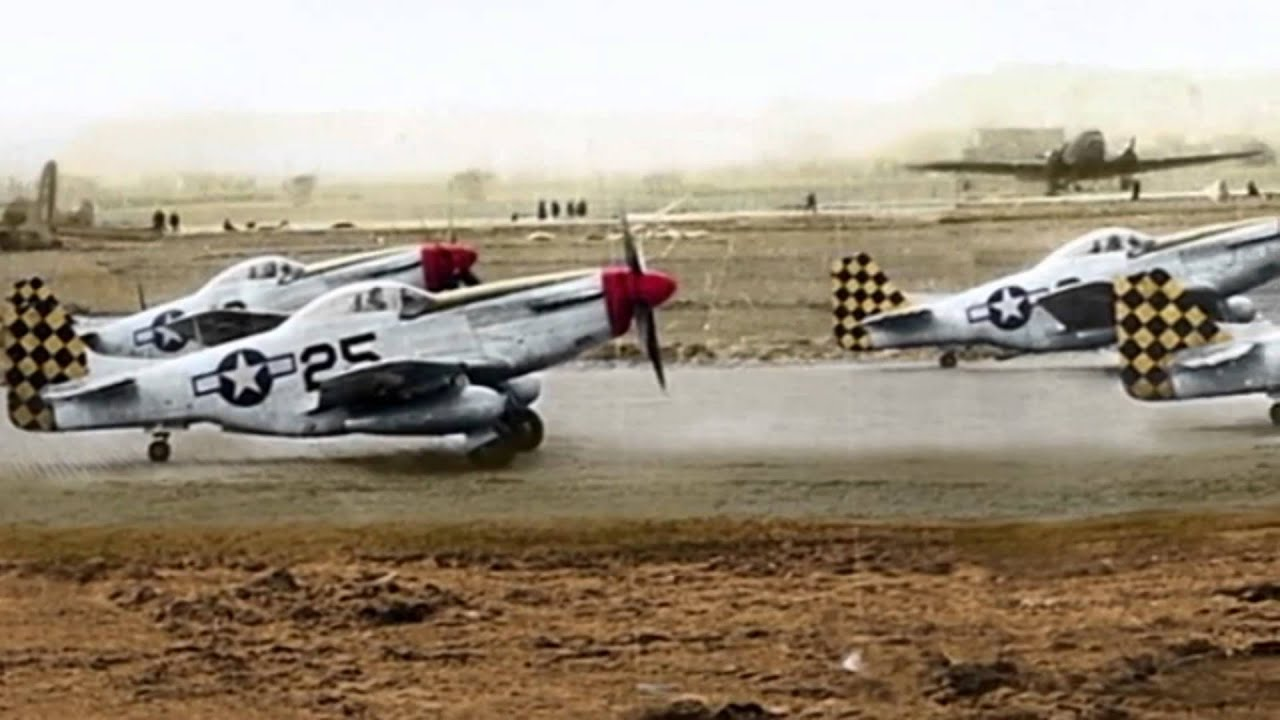
Squadron P-51D Mustangs taxi before a combat mission

It escorted the heavy bombers of Fifteenth Air Force on long range missions against the Daimler Benz factory in Berlin, the Messerschmitt factory in Regensburg and oil refineries near Vienna. It also flew escort for attacks on other targets, such as airfields and marshalling yards and lines of communication in Italy, France, Germany, Czechoslovakia, Austria, Hungary, Yugoslavia and Romania. It also protected reconnaissance aircraft and strafed trains, vehicles and airfields. The squadron continued operations until May 1945. The 317th was credited with the destruction of 209 enemy aircraft in air to air combat. After V-E Day, it moved to Vincenzo Airfield, Italy, remaining there until October, when it returned to the United States and was inactivated at Camp Kilmer, New Jersey on 28 October.

=== Air Defense Command ===
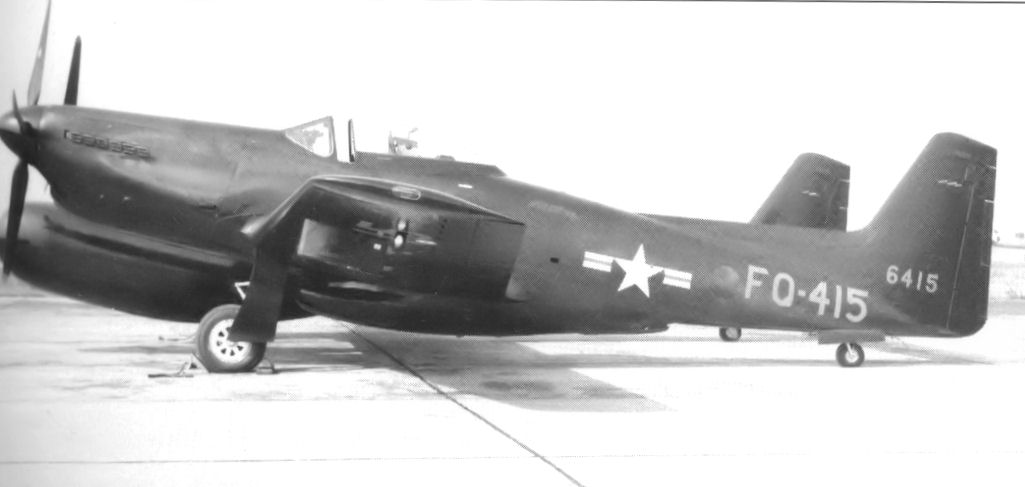
317th Fighter-All Weather Squadron P-82F Twin Mustang (Note: Aircraft is North American P-82F Twin Mustang serial 46-415 at Hamilton AFB, California in 1948.)

In May 1947, the squadron was reactivated at Mitchel Field, New York and equipped with Northrop P-61 Black Widows. it moved to Moses Lake Air Force Base, Washington, the squadron was re-equipped with the new North American F-82 Twin Mustang in October 1948. The squadron was assigned for the defense of the Hanford Nuclear Reservation in Eastern Washington. One month later it was reassigned to Hamilton Air Force Base, California, and in April 1950, returned to McChord Air Force Base, Washington.

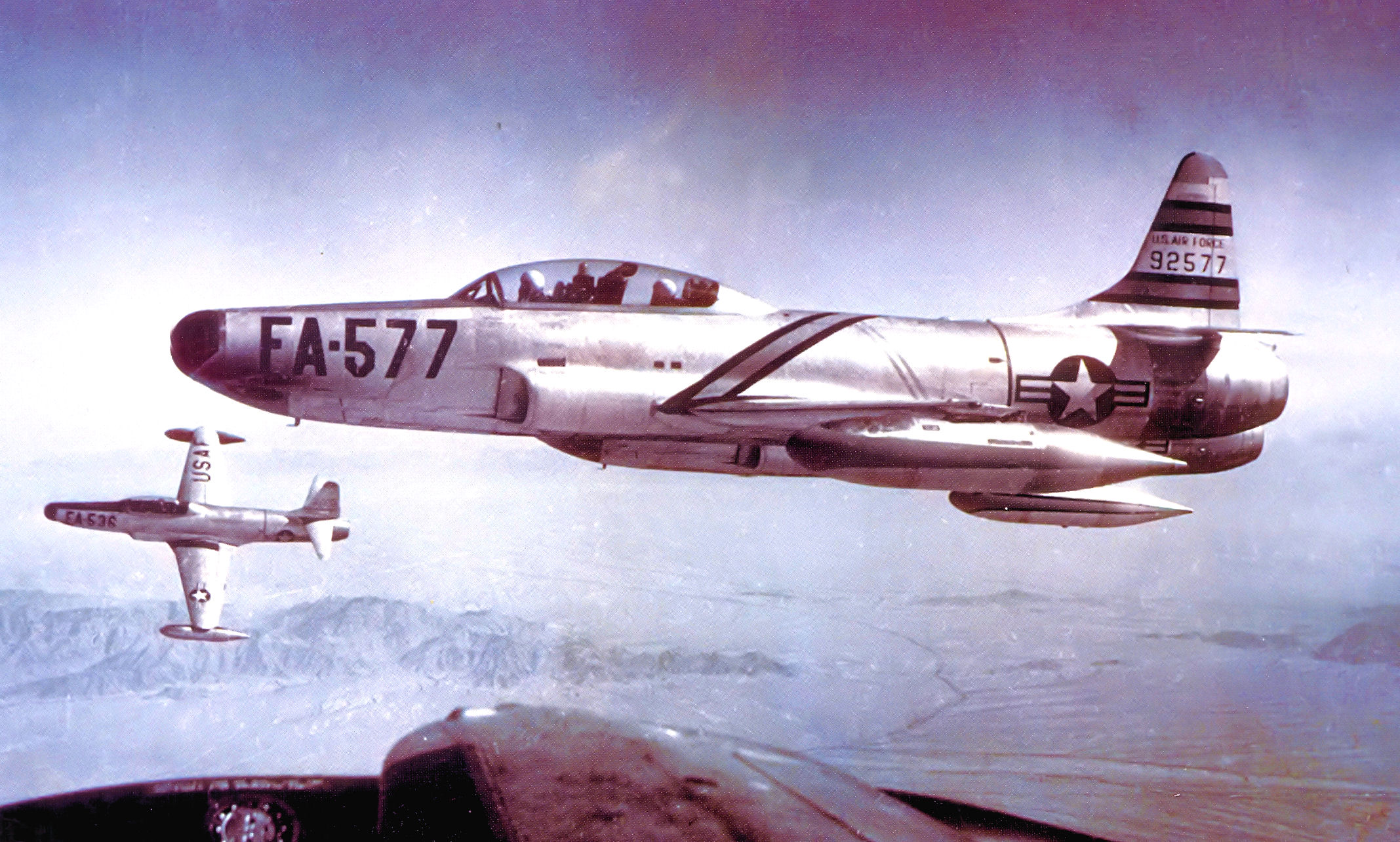
317th Fighter-Interceptor Squadron F-94 Starfire (Note: Aircraft is Lockheed F-94A-5-LO serial 49-2577, taken in 1951. The 317th FIS was the first squadron with the F-94A Starfire.)

In 1951. the squadron was redesignated as the 317th Fighter Interceptor Squadron, a component of the 25th Air Division, Air Defense Command, During the period between 1947 and 1956. the 317th flew the F-82. the Lockheed F-94 Starfire, and the North American F-86D Sabre interceptor. In 1955 and 1956, at Vincent Air Force Base, Yuma, Arizona, flying the F-86D, the 317th engaged in airborne rocket competition, breaking all records previously set. In August 1956 the squadron was selected as the best air defense unit in the Air Force and was awarded the Hughes Trophy, In addition, the squadron received its first Outstanding Unit Award for high combat readiness for the period of 1953 through 1956. In November 1956, the 317th began transitioning into the Convair F-102 Delta Dagger.

=== Alaskan Air Command ===
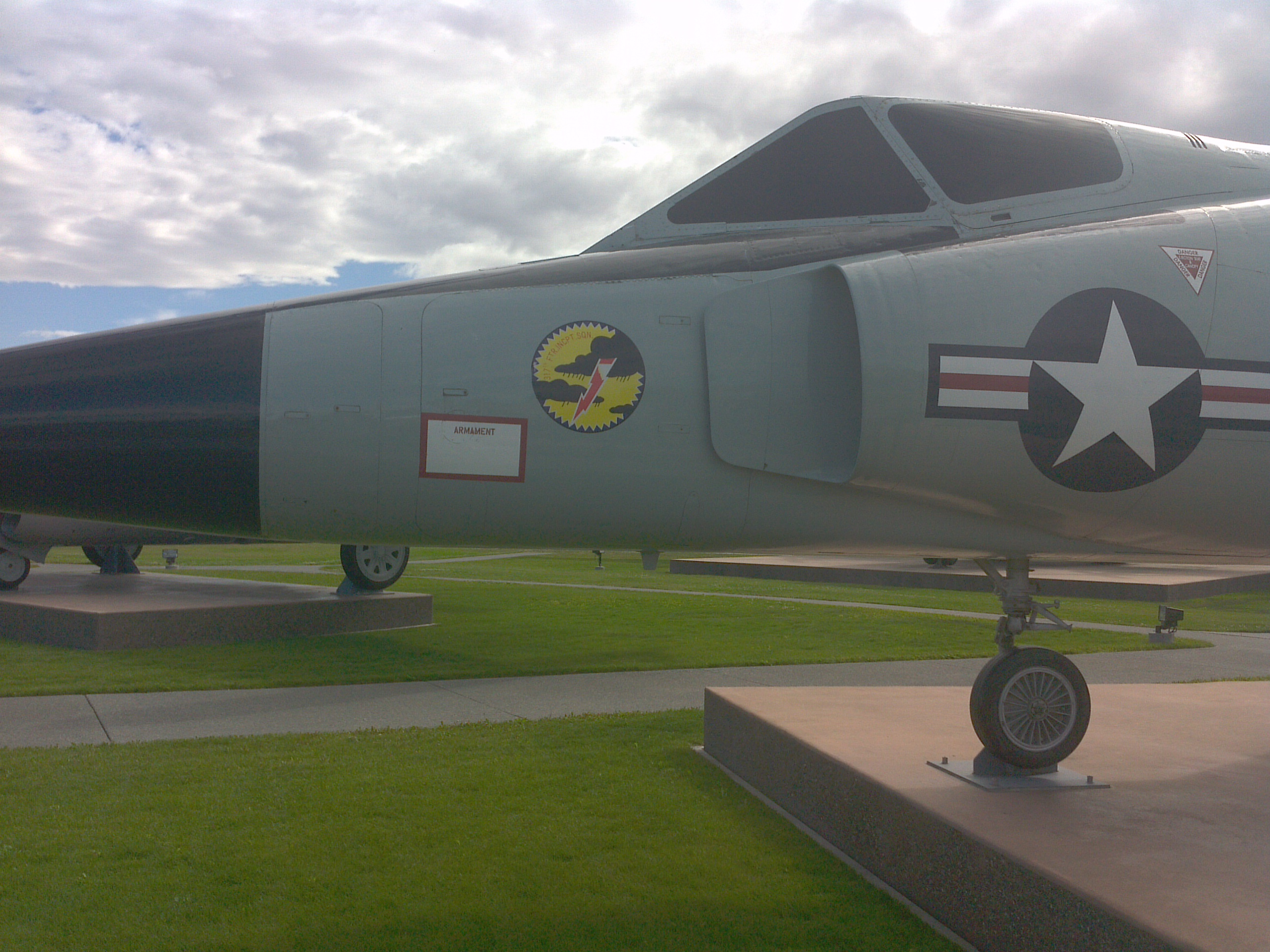
F-102 Delta Dagger from the 317th Fighter-Interceptor Squadron.

In November 1956, the 317th began transitioning into the F-102A Delta Dagger, becoming the second squadron to receive the new delta-winged supersonic aircraft. In August 1957, the 317th was reassigned in force, to Elmendorf Air Force Base, Alaska, where it assumed air defense mission of the southern portion of Alaska and the northwestern approaches to the United States.

In the summer of 1960. the 449th Fighter-Interceptor Squadron was inactivated and Ladd Air Force Base was closed. leaving the entire Alaska air defense mission to the 317th. To carry out this mission, the squadron was authorized 40 aircraft and 60 pilots. The squadron received its second Air Force Outstanding Unit Award for maintaining full combat readiness during and after the 1964 Alaska earthquake on 27 March 1964.

In the summer of 1965, the 317th was reduced to 29 aircraft and the manning reduced accordingly, but the air defense mission remained the same. In October 1965, the squadron was awarded the Hughes Trophy for the second time, and a third Air Force Outstanding Unit Award for combat readiness.

In December 1969, due to budget reductions, the 317th Fighter-Interceptor Squadron was inactivated.

== Lineage ==
- Constituted as the 317th Fighter Squadron on 24 June 1942

Activated on 3 August 1942.
Inactivated on 28 October 1945

- Activated on 25 August 1947

Redesignated 317th Fighter Squadron (All Weather)' on 10 May 1948
Redesignated 317th Fighter-All Weather Squadron on 20 January 1950
Redesignated 317th Fighter-Interceptor Squadron on 1 May 1951
Inactivated on 31 December 1969

=== Assignments ===
- 325th Fighter Group, 3 August 1942 – 28 October 1945
- Fourth Air Force, 25 August 1947
- 325th Fighter Group (later 325th Fighter-All Weather Group, 325th Fighter-Interceptor Group), 31 December 1947
- 4704th Air Defense Wing, 6 February 1952
- 567th Air Defense Group, 16 February 1953
- 325th Fighter Group, 18 August 1955
- 10th Air Division, 15 August 1957
- 5070th Air Defense Wing, 25 August 1960
- Alaskan Air Command, 1 October 1961
- 21st Composite Wing, 8 July 1966 – 31 December 1969

=== Stations ===
- Mitchel Field, New York, 3 August 1942
- Hillsgrove Army Air Field, Rhode Island, 3 August 1942 – 23 January 1943
- Tafaraoui Airfield, Algeria, 28 February 1943
- Montesquieu Airfield, Algeria, 19 May 1943
- Souk-el-Khemis Airfield, Tunisia, 3 June 1943
- Mateur Airfield, Tunisia, 21 June 1943
- Soliman Airfield, Tunisia, c. 4 November 1943
- Foggia Airfield, Italy, 10 December 1943
- Lesina Airfield, Italy, 29 March 1944
- Rimini Airport, Italy, c. 5 March 1945
- Mondolfo Airfield, Italy, c. 3 April 1945
- Vincenzo Airfield, Italy, 9 July – October 1945
- Camp Kilmer, New Jersey, 26–28 October 1945
- McChord Field, Washington, 25 August 1947
- Hamilton Air Force Base, California, 24 November 1947
- Moses Lake Air Force Base, Washington, 26 November 1948
- McChord Air Force Base, Washington, 23 April 1950
- Elmendorf Air Force Base, Alaska, 15 August 1957 – 31 December 1969

=== Aircraft ===
- Curtiss P-40 Warhawk, 1942–1943
- Republic P-47 Thunderbolt, 1943–1944
- North American P-51 Mustang, 1944–1945
- Northrop P-61 Black Widow, 1947–1948
- North American F-82 Twin Mustang, 1948–1951
- Lockheed F-94A Starfire, 1950–1953
- North American F-86D Sabre, 1953–1956
- Convair F-102 Delta Dagger, 1956–1969

=== Awards and campaigns ===
Award streamer	Award	Dates	Notes
	Presidential Unit Citation	30 July 1943	Sardinia, 317th Fighter Squadron
	Presidential Unit Citation	30 January 1944	Italy, 317th Fighter Squadron
	Air Force Outstanding Unit Award	1 March 1953-30 June 1956	317th Fighter-Interceptor Squadron
	Air Force Outstanding Unit Award	27 March 1964–30 April 1964	317th Fighter-Interceptor Squadron
	Air Force Outstanding Unit Award	1 July 1964–30 Jun 1965	317th Fighter-Interceptor Squadron
	Air Force Outstanding Unit Award	1 July 1965–30 Jun 1966	317th Fighter-Interceptor Squadron
	Air Force Outstanding Unit Award	8 July 1966–1 May 1967	317th Fighter-Interceptor Squadron
	Air Force Outstanding Unit Award	2 May 1967–1 January 1968	317th Fighter-Interceptor Squadron
	Air Force Outstanding Unit Award	2 January 1968–31 December 1968	317th Fighter-Interceptor Squadron
	Air Force Outstanding Unit Award	1 January 1969–31 December 1969	317th Fighter-Interceptor Squadron

Campaign Streamer	Campaign	Dates	Notes
	Air Offensive, Europe	1 March 1943 – 5 June 1944	317th Fighter Squadron
	Air Combat, EAME Theater	1 March 1943 – 11 May 1945	317th Fighter Squadron
	Tunisia	1 March 1943 – 13 May 1943	317th Fighter Squadron
	Sicily	14 May 1943 – 17 August 1943	317th Fighter Squadron
	Naples-Foggia	18 August 1943 – 21 January 1944	317th Fighter Squadron
	Anzio	22 January 1944 – 24 May 1944	317th Fighter Squadron
	Rome-Arno	22 January 1944 – 9 September 1944	317th Fighter Squadron
	Normandy	6 June 1944 – 24 July 1944	317th Fighter Squadron
	Northern France	25 July 1944 – 14 September 1944	317th Fighter Squadron
	Southern France	15 August 1944 – 14 September 1944	317th Fighter Squadron
	North Apennines	10 September 1944 – 4 April 1945	317th Fighter Squadron
	Rhineland	15 September 1944 – 21 March 1945	317th Fighter Squadron
	Central Europe	22 March 1944 – 21 May 1945	317th Fighter Squadron
	Po Valley	3 April 1945 – 8 May 1945	317th Fighter Squadron
