= 318th Fighter-Interceptor Squadron =

318th Fighter Interceptor Squadron
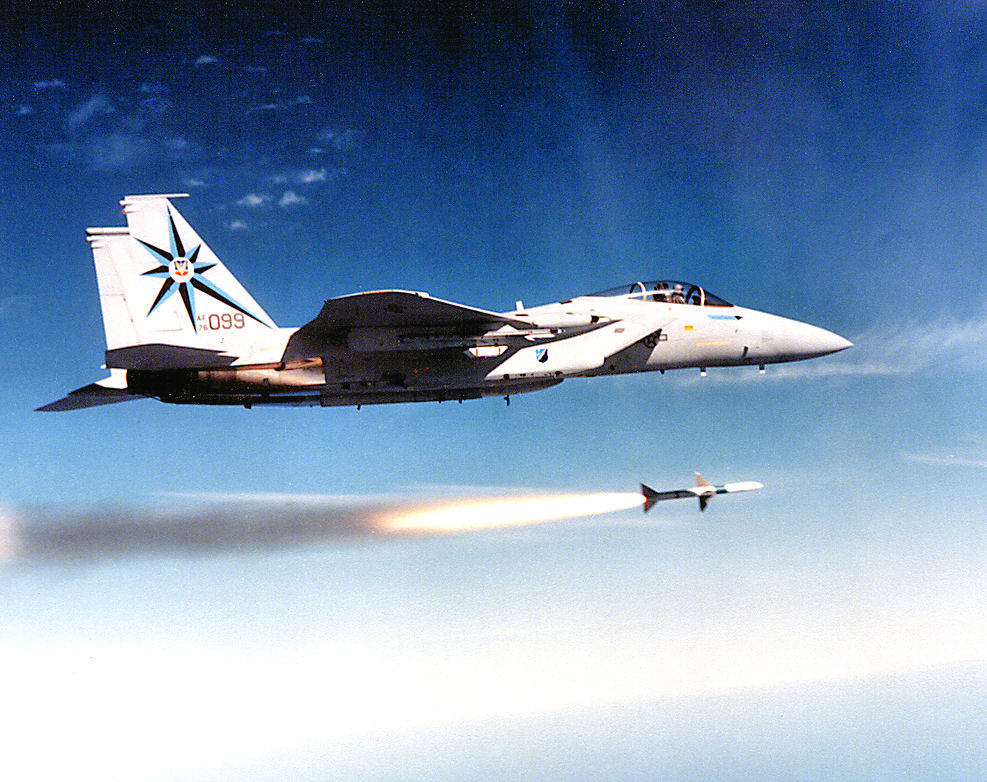
- F-15 Eagle of the 318th Fighter Interceptor Squadron
- Active: 1942–1945; 1947–1989
- Country: United States
- Branch: United States Air Force
- Role: Fighter Interceptor
- Nickname: Green Dragons
- Engagements: Mediterranean Theater of Operations
- Decorations: Distinguished Unit Citation; Air Force Outstanding Unit Award

Insignia
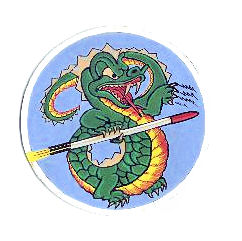
- 318th Fighter Interceptor Squadron emblem (Note: Approved 9 November 1955. Description: On a light blue disc, a Chinese Green Dragon with a fierce expression, body scales shadowed dark green, under the part of the body in rolled scales air force yellow and vermillion orange, his back barbed white, his eyeballs white with blood lines, claws, teeth, and fangs white outlined in his left hand emitting electronic rays, his right claw grasping a red tipped white rocket with black fins fire exhaust proper. According to Medieval History, the only way to slay the formable Green Dragon was to equip the bravest available man with a lance and stout armor plate. In modern times, this deadliest of all killers is equipped with rockets which again returns the "Green Dragon" to the position of the most dangerous opponent to man.)

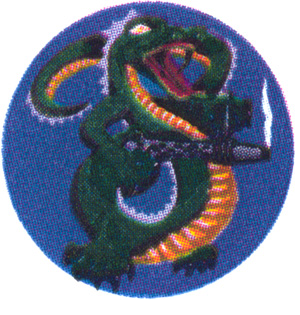
- 318th Fighter Squadron emblem (Note: Approved 11 June 1943. Description: On a light blue disc, a Chinese Green Dragon, fangs and claws black, armored gold, mouth and tongue red, grasping a gray machine gun, emitting smoke from the barrel proper. Significance: According to Medieval History, the only way to slay the formable Green Dragon was to equip the bravest available man with a lance and stout armor plate. In modern times, this deadliest of all killers is equipped with a machine gun which again returns the "Green Dragon" to the position of the most dangerous opponent to man.)

The 318th Fighter Interceptor Squadron is an inactive United States Air Force unit. Its last assignment was with the 25th Air Division at McChord Air Force Base, Washington, where it was inactivated on 7 December 1989.

The squadron was first activated as the 318th Fighter Squadron during World War II. After training in the United States, it deployed to North Africa. In combat operations in the Mediterranean Theater of Operations. It was withdrawn from combat from September to December 1943 while it equipped with different aircraft and moved from Africa to Italy. It earned two Distinguished Unit Citations before returning to the United States for inactivation.

The squadron was reactivated in 1947, serving in the air defense role in the Northeastern United States, initially equipping with World War II era night fighters. By 1950, it had moved across the continent and began to equip with jet fighters. In 1953, the squadron moved to provide air defense of Greenland, but it was replaced by another squadron the following year. With the implementation of Project Arrow in the summer of 1955, the 318th returned to the Pacific Northwest and its traditional headquarters, the 325th Fighter Group. During the Cuban Missile Crisis, the squadron deployed a third of its aircraft to a nearby airfield. When the Soviet Long-Range Aviation began flights over Alaska, the squadron deployed aircraft and crews to augment Alaskan Air Command. In 1968, following the Pueblo Crisis it deployed planes to Korea.

== History ==
=== World War II ===
The squadron was first organized at Mitchel Field, New York on 3 August 1942 as one of the three original squadrons of the 325th Fighter Group, but moved the same day to New Bedford Army Air Field, Massachusetts. It equipped with Curtiss P-40 Warhawks and trained for combat at New Bedford and Grenier Field, New Hampshire until late January 1943, when it began to deploy overseas.

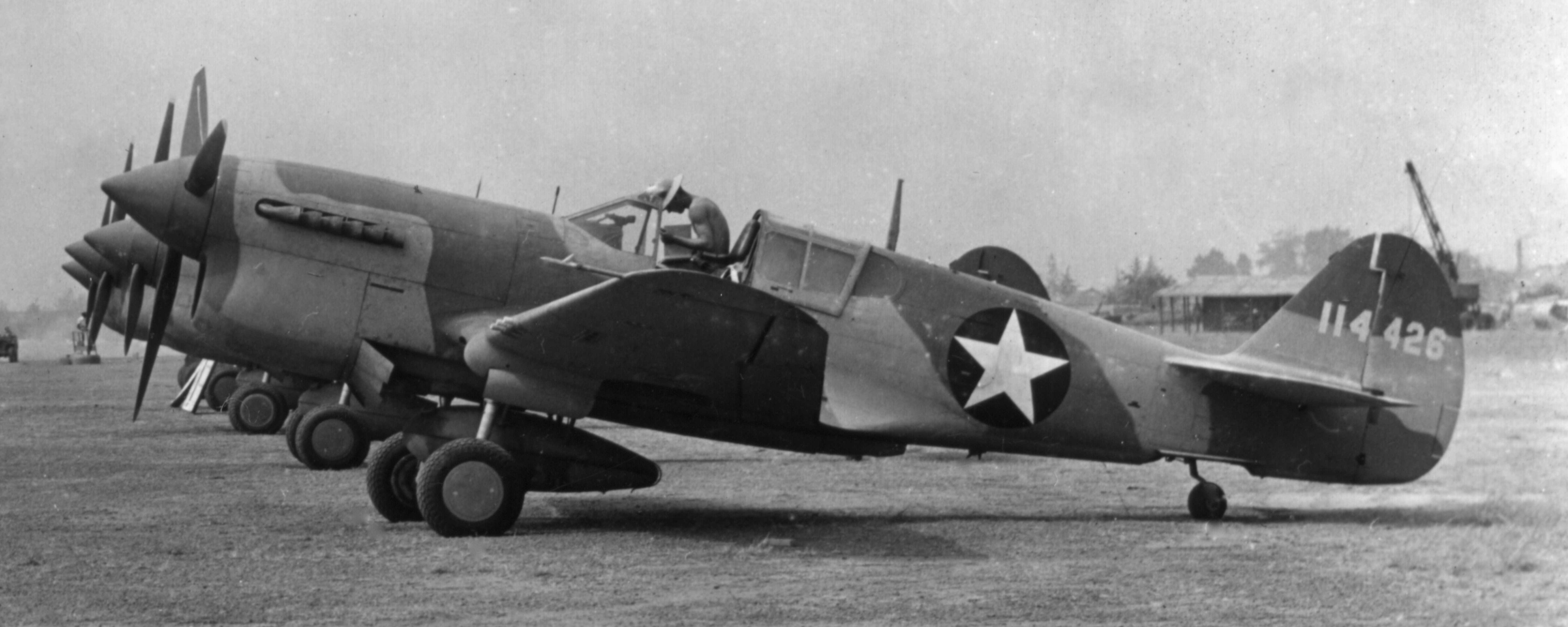
P-40s at Tafaraoui Airfield

The squadron arrived in the Mediterranean Theater of Operations in February and was established at its first combat station, Tafaraoui Airfield, Algeria by 28 February 1943. It flew its first combat mission on 17 April. It escorted medium bombers. It flew strafing missions and flew sweeps over the Mediterranean Sea from bases in Algeria and Tunisia. The squadron participated in the defeat of Axis forces in Tunisia. It participated in the reduction of Pantelleria and in Operation Husky, the invasion and conquest of Sicily. On 30 July, the 325th Group used diversionary tactics to lure a superior number of enemy planes into the air over Sardinia, destroying more than half of them. The squadron was awarded its first Distinguished Unit Citation for this action. In late September 1943, the squadron was withdrawn from combat to convert to Republic P-47 Thunderbolts and prepare to move to the Italian peninsula.

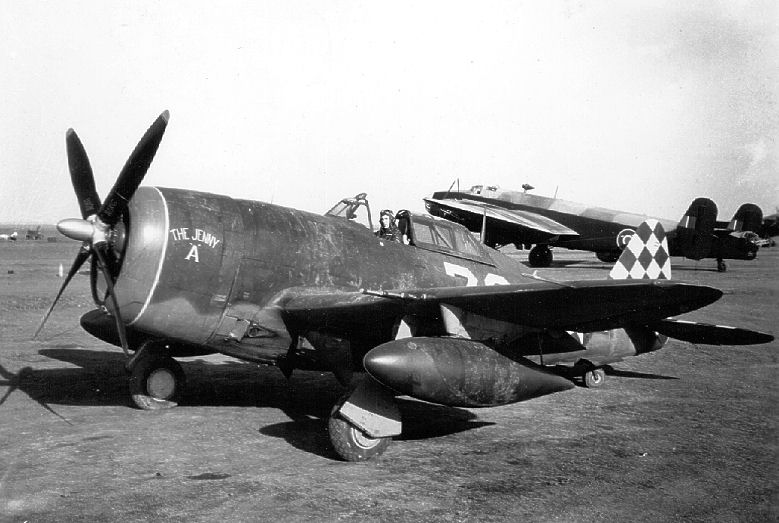
325th Fighter Group P-47

By early December 1943, the squadron began to operate its Thunderbolts from Foggia Airfield, Italy, flying its first mission with the new plane on 14 December. However, it only operated the P-47 for a short period, converting to North American P-51 Mustangs in March 1944, and moving to Lesina Airfield, Italy on the 29th of the month. However, on 30 January it flew its "T-Bolts" more than 300 miles at very low altitude to make a surprise attack on German interceptors defending airdromes near Villorba. The severe losses it inflicted on the defending forces enabled heavy bombers to attack vital targets in the area without encountering serious opposition. This action resulted in the second award of the Distinguished Unit Citation to the squadron.

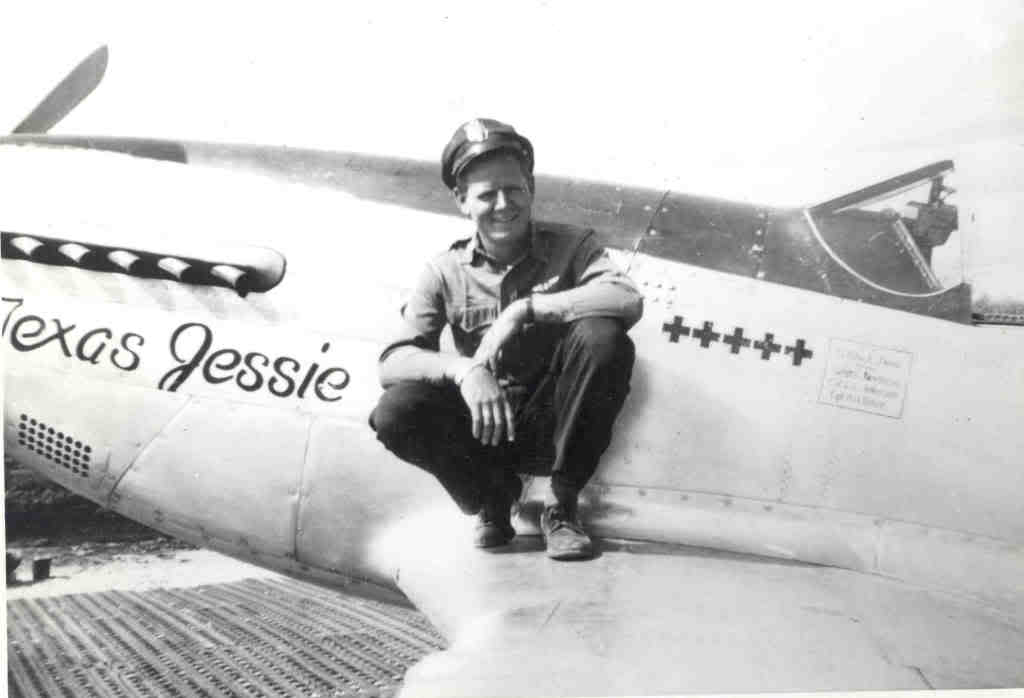
1/Lt William E. Aron, an ace with the squadron

It escorted the heavy bombers of Fifteenth Air Force on long range missions against the Daimler Benz factory in Berlin, the Messerschmitt factory in Regensburg and oil refineries near Vienna. It also flew escort for attacks on other targets, such as airfields and marshalling yards and lines of communication in Italy, France, Germany, Czechoslovakia, Austria, Hungary, Yugoslavia and Romania. It also protected reconnaissance aircraft and strafed trains, vehicles and airfields. The squadron continued operations until May 1945. The 318th was credited with the destruction of 173 enemy aircraft in air to air combat. After V-E Day, it moved to Vincenzo Airfield, Italy, remaining there until October, when it returned to the United States and was inactivated at Camp Kilmer, New Jersey on 28 October.

=== Air Defense Command ===
==== Early operations ====
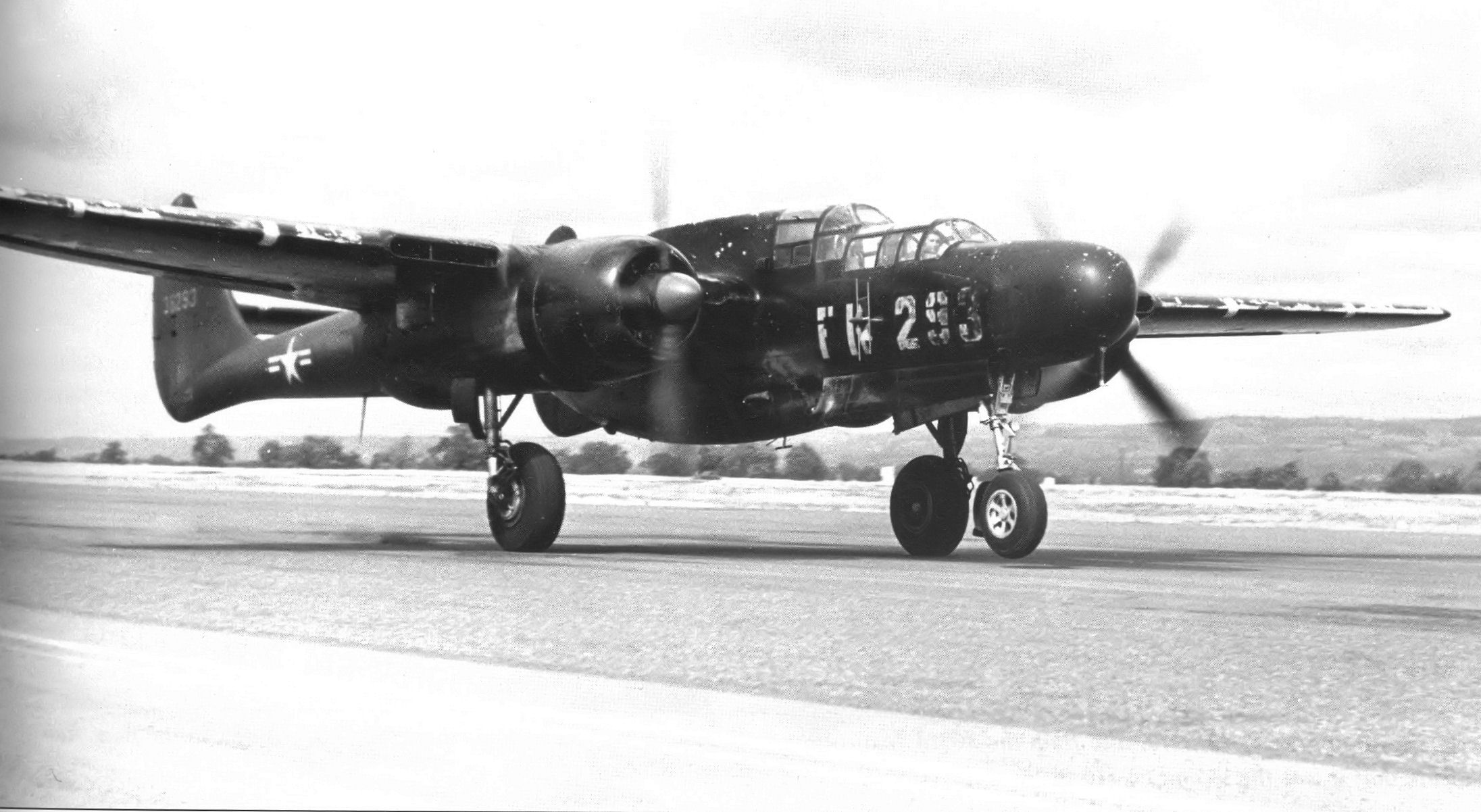
Squadron P-61B Black Widow at Hamilton Field (Note: Aircraft is Northrop P-61B-20-NO Black Widow, serial 43-8293. Taken in 1947.)

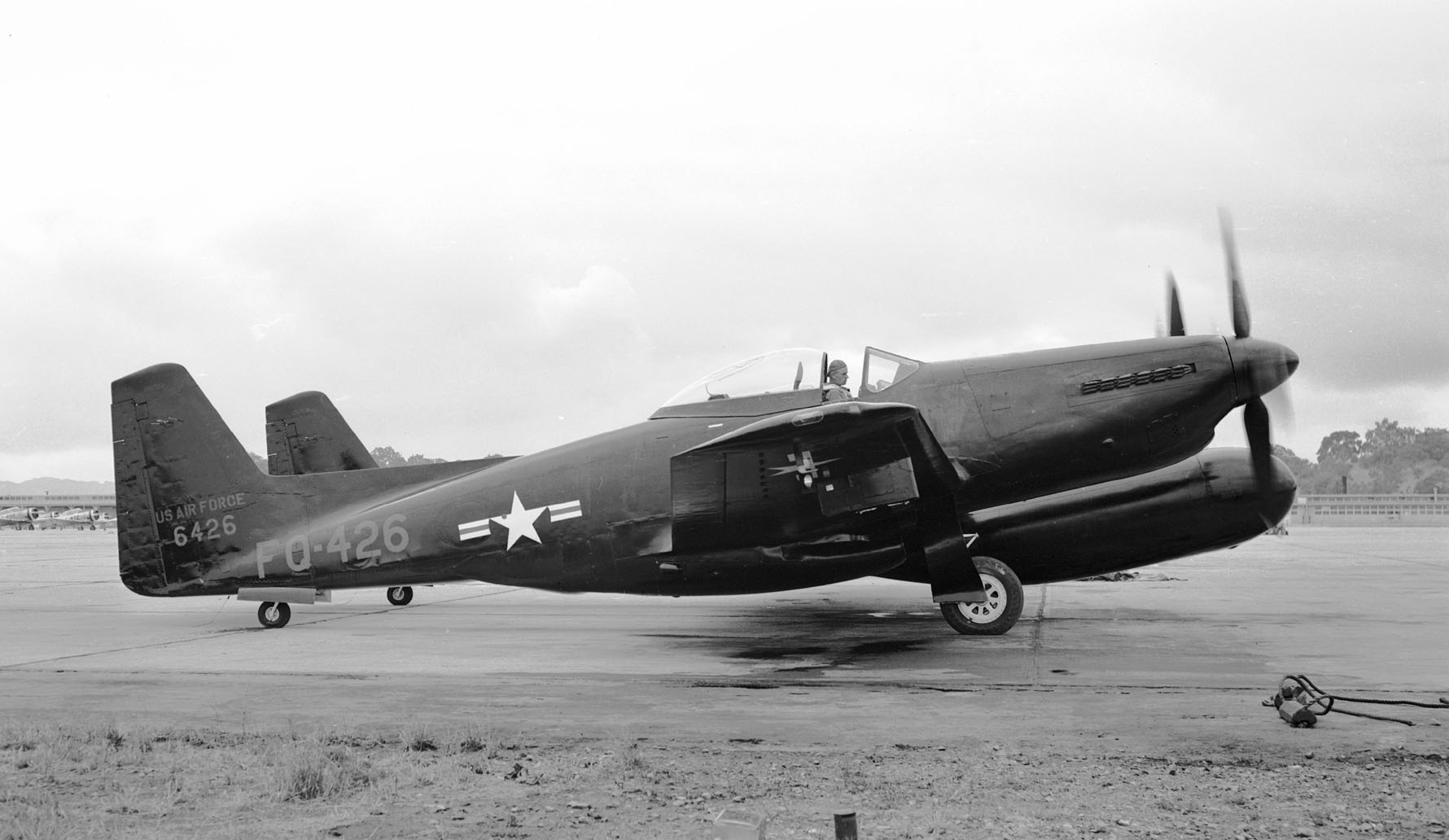
Squadron F-82 Twin Mustang (Note: Aircraft is North American F-82F Twin Mustang, serial 46-426.)

The squadron was reactivated in May 1947 at Mitchell Field, New York as an element of Air Defense Command (ADC). In December 1947 it moved to Hamilton Field, California where it received its first aircraft, Northrop P-61 Black Widows which had been pressed into the air defense mission. In the spring of 1948 the squadron received new North American F-82 Twin Mustangs and in November 1948, it moved to McChord Air Force Base, Washington. There, it was redesignated the 318th Fighter All Weather Squadron in January 1950 and the 318th Fighter-Interceptor Squadron' in May 1951. In June 1951 the squadron began its transition into jet Lockheed F-94A Starfire interceptors armed with 20 millimeter cannon, completing the upgrade by the end of the year.

In June 1953, the squadron moved to Thule Air Base, Greenland, where it came under the control of the Northeast Air Command. The squadron returned to ADC in August 1954 when it was replaced by the 74th Fighter-Interceptor Squadron, which moved from Presque Isle Air Force Base, Maine and took over the 318th's Starfighters. In turn, the 318th moved to Presque Isle and equipped with the 74th's former Northrop F-89D Scorpions, armed with FFAR rockets. In August 1955 ADC implemented Project Arrow, which was designed to bring back on the active list the fighter units which had compiled memorable records in the two world wars. As part of this project, the squadron returned to McChord and once again became part of the 325th Fighter Group, to which it had been assigned during World War II. At McChord, it took over the personnel and North American F-86D Sabres formerly assigned to the 465th Fighter-Interceptor Squadron, which was inactivated.

==== F-106 era ====
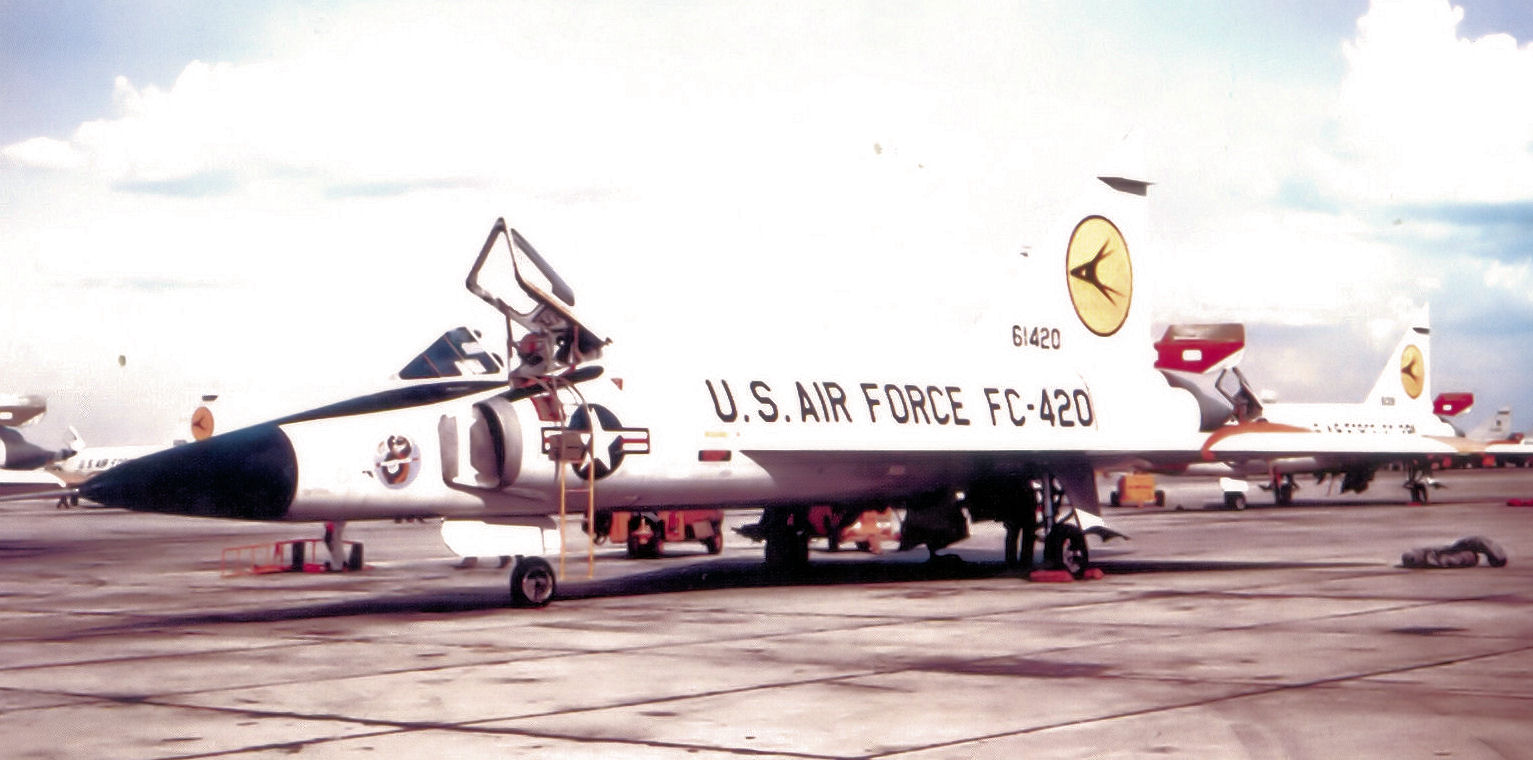
Squadron F-102A Delta Dagger (Note: Aircraft is Convair F-102A-75-CO Delta Dagger 56-1420.)

In March 1957, the squadron began a transition into supersonic Convair F-102A Delta Daggers, armed with GAR-1 Falcons and equipped with data link for interception control through the Semi-Automatic Ground Environment system. In March 1960, the 325th Fighter Group was inactivated and the squadron was assigned directly to the 325th Fighter Wing The following month it upgraded to Convair F-106 Delta Darts.

On 22 October 1962, before President John F. Kennedy told Americans that missiles were in place in Cuba, the squadron dispersed one third of its force, equipped with nuclear tipped missiles to Paine Air Force Base at the start of the Cuban Missile Crisis. These planes returned to McChord after the crisis was over.

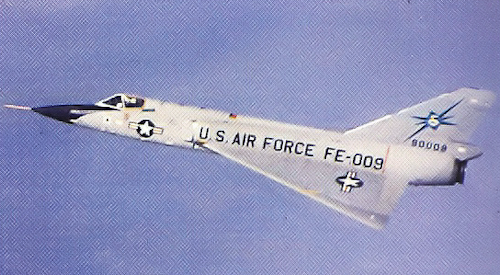
quadron F-106 Delta Dart (Note: Aircraft is Convair F-106 Delta Dart 59-9.)

On 15 March 1963, two Soviet bombers overflew Alaska and Alaskan Air Command F-102s were unable to intercept them. The response to this intrusion was to deploy ten F-106s from the squadron and its sister unit, the 498th Fighter-Interceptor Squadron to Alaska in what was called Operation White Shoes. However, maintaining these aircraft for an extended period of time put a strain on the 325th Wing's combat readiness back at McChord, and eventually a detachment of maintenance personnel was established to maintain the planes in Alaska. The unit got relief from this commitment while it was upgrading its F-106s from the 1st Fighter-Interceptor Wing, which relieved it from March to June 1964. Operation White Shoes terminated in 1965 and the unit's planes returned home.

On 11 February 1968, the 318th deployed to Osan Air Base, Republic of Korea from McChord to provide air defense following the 26 January 1968 North Korea seizure of the USS Pueblo in Operation Red Fox. This marked the first time in history that F-106s had flown across the Pacific using in-flight refueling. In June 1968, the squadron was relieved by the 48th Fighter-Interceptor Squadron, but its aircraft remained in Korea. As its personnel returned to the United States, they re-equipped with F-106s from the 48th. The 325th Wing inactivated on 1 July 1968 as Military Airlift Command assumed responsibility for McChord, and the squadron was reassigned directly to the 25th Air Division.

In 1970 and in 1984, the squadron won the Hughes Trophy as the best interceptor squadron in the Air Force. On 24 November 1971, D. B. Cooper hijacked a Northwest Orient Airlines flight, demanding ransom and threatening the passengers. Two F-106s from the squadron scrambled to trail the hijacked airliner.

==== Final operations at McChord ====
The 318th converted to McDonnell F-15 Eagles in 1983. During its time flying the F-106, the squadron had maintained alert detachments at various times at Kingsley Field, Oregon; Walla Walla Regional Airport, Washington; and at Castle Air Force Base, California. The detachment at Castle was active when the squadron converted to Eagles, but it continued to operate the Delta Dart. Although administratively part of the 318th, it drew its pilots and technicians from the 194th Fighter-Interceptor Squadron of the California Air National Guard. The squadron remained at McChord until inactivating on 7 December 1989.

== Lineage ==
- Constituted as the 318th Fighter Squadron on 24 June 1942

Activated on 3 August 1942
Inactivated on 28 October 1945

- Activated on 21 May 1947

Redesignated 318th Fighter Squadron (All Weather) on 10 May 1948
Redesignated 318th Fighter-All Weather Squadron on 20 January 1950
Redesignated 318th Fighter-Interceptor Squadron on 1 May 1951
Inactivated 7 December 1989

=== Assignments ===
- 325th Fighter Group, 3 August 1942 – 28 October 1945
- 325th Fighter Group (later 325th Fighter-All Weather Group, 325th Fighter-Interceptor Group), 21 May 1947
- 4704th Defense Wing, 6 February 1952
- 567th Air Defense Group, 16 February 1953
- 64th Air Division, 1 July 1953
- 528th Air Defense Group, 8 August 1954
- 325th Fighter Group (Air Defense), 18 August 1955
- 325th Fighter Wing (Air Defense), 25 March 1960 – 1 July 1968
- 25th Air Division, 1 July 1968
- Northwest Air Defense Sector, 1 December 1987 – 7 December 1989

=== Stations ===
- Mitchel Field, New York, 3 August 1942
- New Bedford Army Air Field, Massachusetts, 3 August 1942
- Grenier Field, New Hampshire, 3 October 1942 – 22 January 1943
- Tafaraoui Airfield, Algeria, 28 February 1943
- Montesquieu Airfield, Algeria, 7 April 1943
- Souk-el-Khemis Airfield, Tunisia, 3 June 1943
- Mateur Airfield, Tunisia, 19 June 1943
- Soliman Airfield, Tunisia, 4 November 1943
- Foggia Airfield, Italy, 9 December 1943
- Lesina Airfield, Italy, 29 March 1944
- Rimini, Italy, c. 7 March 1945
- Mondolfo, Italy, c. 3 April 1945
- Vincenzo Airfield, Italy, 9 July – October 1945
- Camp Kilmer, New Jersey, 26–28 October 1945
- Mitchel Field, New York, 21 May 1947
- Hamilton Field (later Hamilton Air Force Base), California, 2 December 1947
- McChord Air Force Base, Washington, 26 November 1948
- Thule Air Base, Greenland, 1 July 1953
- Presque Isle Air Force Base, Maine, 5 August 1954
- McChord Air Force Base, Washington, 18 August 1955 – 7 December 1989

=== Aircraft ===
- Curtiss P-40 Warhawk, 1942–1943
- Republic P-47 Thunderbolt, 1943–1944
- North American P-51 Mustang, 1944–1945
- Northrop P-61 Black Widow, 1947–1948
- North American F-82 Twin Mustang, 1948–1951
- Lockheed F-94A Starfire, 1951–1954
- Northrop F-89D Scorpion, 1954–1955
- North American F-86D Sabre, 1955–1957
- Convair F-102 Delta Dagger, 1957–1960
- Lockheed T-33 Shooting Star, 1951–1988 (used as a proficiency trainer and practice "bogey" aircraft)
- Convair F-106 Delta Dart, 1960–1983
- McDonnell Douglas F-15 Eagle, 1983–1989

=== Awards and campaigns ===
Award streamer	Award	Dates	Notes
	Presidential Unit Citation	30 July 1943	Sardinia, 318th Fighter Squadron
	Presidential Unit Citation	30 January 1944	Italy, 318th Fighter Squadron
	Air Force Outstanding Unit Award	1 June 1968-1 March 1968	318th Fighter-Interceptor Squadron
	Air Force Outstanding Unit Award	1 April 1972–30 June 1973	318th Fighter-Interceptor Squadron
	Air Force Outstanding Unit Award	1 July 1974–30 June 1976	318th Fighter-Interceptor Squadron
	Air Force Outstanding Unit Award	1 January 1983–1 June 1984	318th Fighter-Interceptor Squadron
	Air Force Outstanding Unit Award	1 July 1984–30 June 1986	318th Fighter-Interceptor Squadron

Campaign Streamer	Campaign	Dates	Notes
	Air Offensive, Europe	28 February 1943 – 5 June 1944	318th Fighter Squadron
	Air Combat, EAME Theater	28 February 1943 – 11 May 1945	318th Fighter Squadron
	Tunisia	28 February 1943 – 13 May 1943	318th Fighter Squadron
	Sicily	14 May 1943 – 17 August 1943	318th Fighter Squadron
	Naples-Foggia	18 August 1943 – 21 January 1944	318th Fighter Squadron
	Anzio	22 January 1944 – 24 May 1944	318th Fighter Squadron
	Rome-Arno	22 January 1944 – 9 September 1944	318th Fighter Squadron
	Normandy	6 June 1944 – 24 July 1944	318th Fighter Squadron
	Northern France	25 July 1944 – 14 September 1944	318th Fighter Squadron
	Southern France	15 August 1944 – 14 September 1944	318th Fighter Squadron
	North Apennines	10 September 1944 – 4 April 1945	318th Fighter Squadron
	Rhineland	15 September 1944 – 21 March 1945	318th Fighter Squadron
	Central Europe	22 March 1944 – 21 May 1945	318th Fighter Squadron
	Po Valley	3 April 1945 – 8 May 1945	318th Fighter Squadron
