= 325th Operations Group =

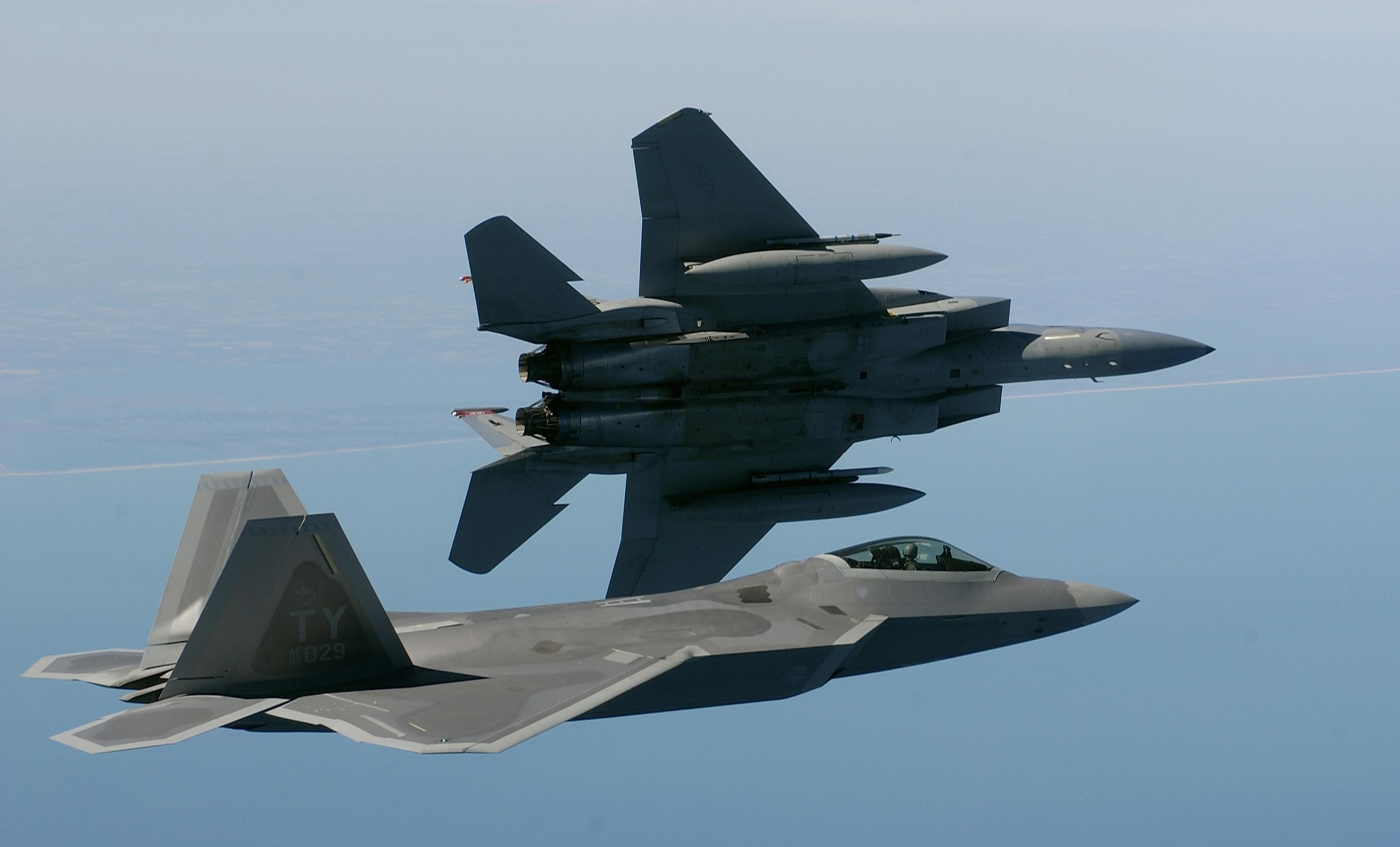
- 43d Fighter Squadron F-22 Raptor with a group F-15 Eagle (Note: Aircraft in foreground is Lockheed Martin F/A-22A LRIP Lot 2 Block 10 Raptor 02-2029.)
- Active: 1942–1945, 1947–1952, 1955–1960, 1991–present
- Country: United States
- Branch: United States Air Force
- Role: Fighter
- Part of: Air Combat Command; Ninth Air Force; 325th Fighter Wing
- Garrison/HQ: Tyndall Air Force Base
- Nickname: Checkertail Clan (World War II)
- Mottos: Locare et Liquidare Latin Locate and Liquidate (1951-present) Consilium Conficitur Plan - Contest (World War II)
- Engagements: World War II Mediterranean Theater of Operations
- Decorations: Distinguished Unit Citation; Air Force Outstanding Unit Award

Insignia
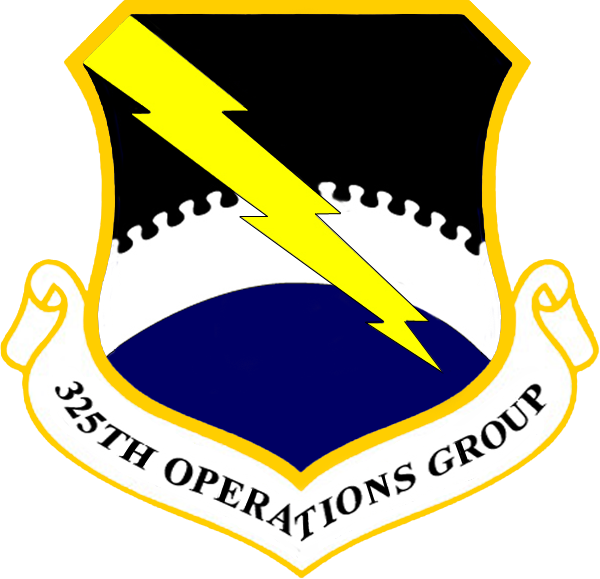
- 325th Operations Group emblem (Note: Approved 1 October 1951.)

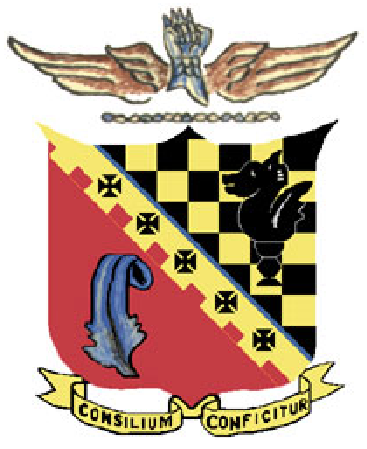
- 325th Fighter Group emblem (World War II)

The 325th Operations Group is the flying component of the 325th Fighter Wing, assigned to Air Combat Command of the United States Air Force. The group is stationed at Tyndall Air Force Base, Florida. It conducts training on the Lockheed Martin F-22 Raptor and commands one operational Raptor squadron. It directs the flying and support operations of two F-22 squadrons, a fighter training squadron, an operations support squadron and a training support squadron.

The group was first activated in August 1942 as the 325th Fighter Group at Mitchel Field, New York. After training at Hillsgrove Army Air Field, Rhode Island, the group moved to North Africa in 1943, where it flew combat missions with the Curtiss P-40 Warhawk, earning a Distinguished Unit Citation for actions over Sardinia for engaging a superior force of enemy aircraft and destroying more than half of them. The group was withdrawn from combat in the fall of 1943 and re-equipped with the Republic P-47 Thunderbolt. After moving to Italy, the group re-entered combat, earning a second Distinguished Unit Citation in January 1944. The group continued in combat until VE Day, returning to the United States in the fall for inactivation.

The 325th was again activated in 1947 as an all-weather fighter unit, moving late in the year to Hamilton Air Force Base. California. It assumed responsibility for air defense of the northern Pacific coast after moving to [[Larson Air Force Base]], Washington. With the beginning of the Korean War, a number of Air National Guard units were activated, one of which was attached to the group. In December 1951, the group dispatched one of its squadrons to Korea to provide all-weather air defense for the Seoul region. However, Air Defense Command (ADC) was finding that the single group and wing organization did not fit its model of dispersed fighter squadrons. Accordingly, it replaced its fighter wings and groups with regionally oriented defense wings and inactivated the group in February 1952.

In 1955, ADC implemented Project Arrow, which replaced its Air Defense Groups organized in the early 1950s with fighter groups that had been active during World War II. The 325th was activated once again at McChord Air Force Base, Washington to replace the 567th Air Defense Group, whose personnel, equipment and mission it assumed. The following year, the 325th Fighter Wing was again activated, and until 1957 the group was a paper organization, used to staff various wing offices. It was inactivated in 1960, with its sole remaining squadron assigned directly to the 325th Wing.

The 325th remained in inactive status until 1991 when it was again activated as the 325th Operations Group.

== Assigned units ==
The 325th Operations Group commands three flying squadrons and two support squadrons.

- 95th Fighter Squadron "Mr. Bones"

The 95th Fighter Squadron activated in June 2023 as an operational F-35A squadron.

- 325th Training Support Squadron "Black Bears"

The 325th Training Support Squadron manages training resources and conducts academic and simulator training for F-22 pilots, air battle managers and intelligence officers.

- 325th Operations Support Squadron

The 325th Operations Support Squadron supports F-35 pilots. The squadron controls all air traffic at Tyndall, manages the airfield complex, and provides weather observation and forecasting. The squadron also provides operations, weapons and tactics, life support and water survival training and scheduling.

== History ==
=== World War II ===
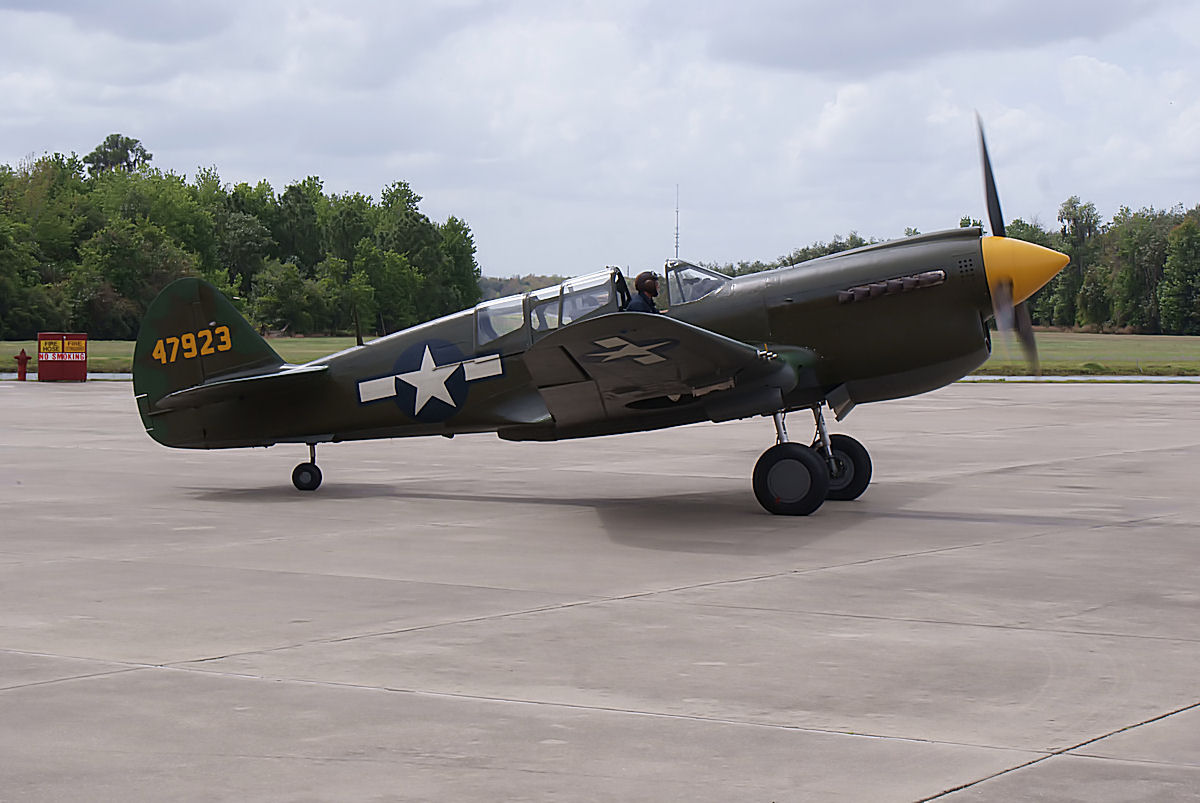
Restored Curtiss P-40

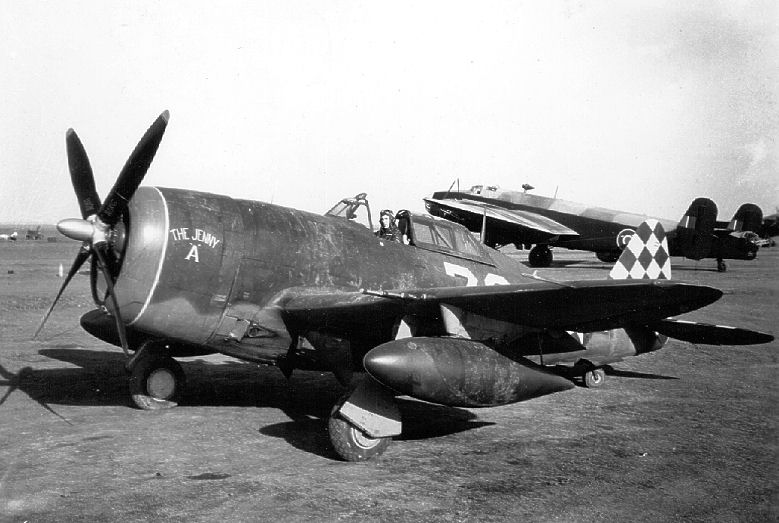
325th Fighter Group P-47 at an Allied airfield in Italy

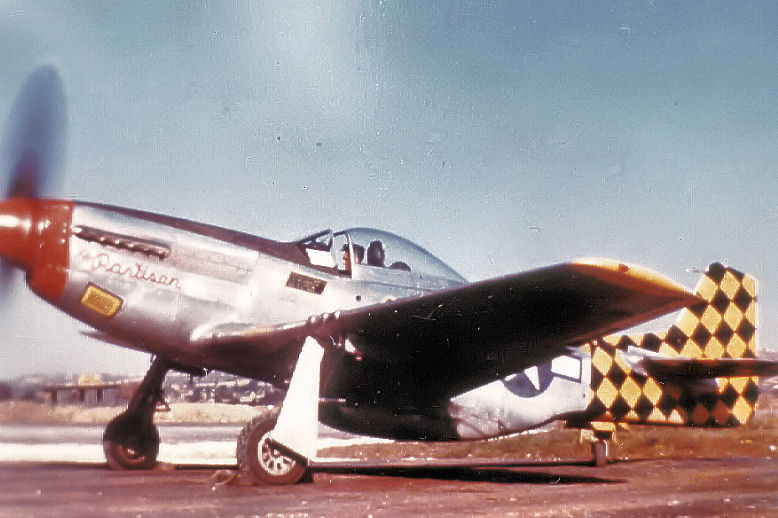
325th Fighter Group P-51D Mustang

The 325th was first activated as the 325th Fighter Group at Mitchel Field, New York in August 1942 with the 317th, 318th, and 319th Fighter Squadrons assigned. It trained at Hillsgrove Army Air Field with Curtiss P-40 Warhawk aircraft before moving to North Africa by ship and transport planes in January through February 1943. The group entered combat in April 1943 and began escorting medium bombers, flying strafing missions, and conducting sea sweeps from bases in Algeria and Tunisia. The 325th participated in the defeat of Axis forces in Tunisia, the reduction of Pantelleria, and the conquest of Sicily. The 325th received a Distinguished Unit Citation (DUC) for action over Sardinia on 30 July 1943 when the group, using diversionary tactics, forced a superior number of enemy planes into the air and destroyed more than half of them. The group did not fly combat missions from the end of September to mid-December 1943 as the 325th converted to Republic P-47 Thunderbolt aircraft and moved to Italy.

The 325th began operations with Fifteenth Air Force in December 1943, and primarily engaged in bomber escort operations. It received a second DUC for a mission on 30 January 1944 when the group flew more than 300 miles at very low altitude to surprise the enemy fighters that were defending German airfields near Villaorba, Italy; by severely damaging the enemy's force, the 325th enabled heavy bombers to strike vital targets in the area without encountering serious opposition. The group converted to North American P-51 Mustang aircraft in May 1944 and provided the fighter escort on the first shuttle bombing mission from Italy to Russia in early June 1944, and became the first American group to score a victory while flying from a Russian base. It escorted heavy bombers during long-range missions to attack the Messerschmitt factory at Regensburg, the Daimler-Benz tank factory at Berlin, oil refineries at Vienna, and other targets, such as airfields, marshalling yards, and communications targets in Italy, France, Germany, Czechoslovakia, Austria, Hungary, Romania, and Yugoslavia. It also covered operations of reconnaissance aircraft and strafed such targets as trains, vehicles, and airfields. The group continued combat operations until May 1945. The group moved back to the U.S. and was inactivated after V-E Day.

325th Ftr Gp Aerial Victories

Aerial Victories	Number	Note
Group Hq	19
317th Fighter Squadron	209
318th Fighter Squadron	173
319th Fighter Squadron	119
Group Total	520

=== Cold War ===
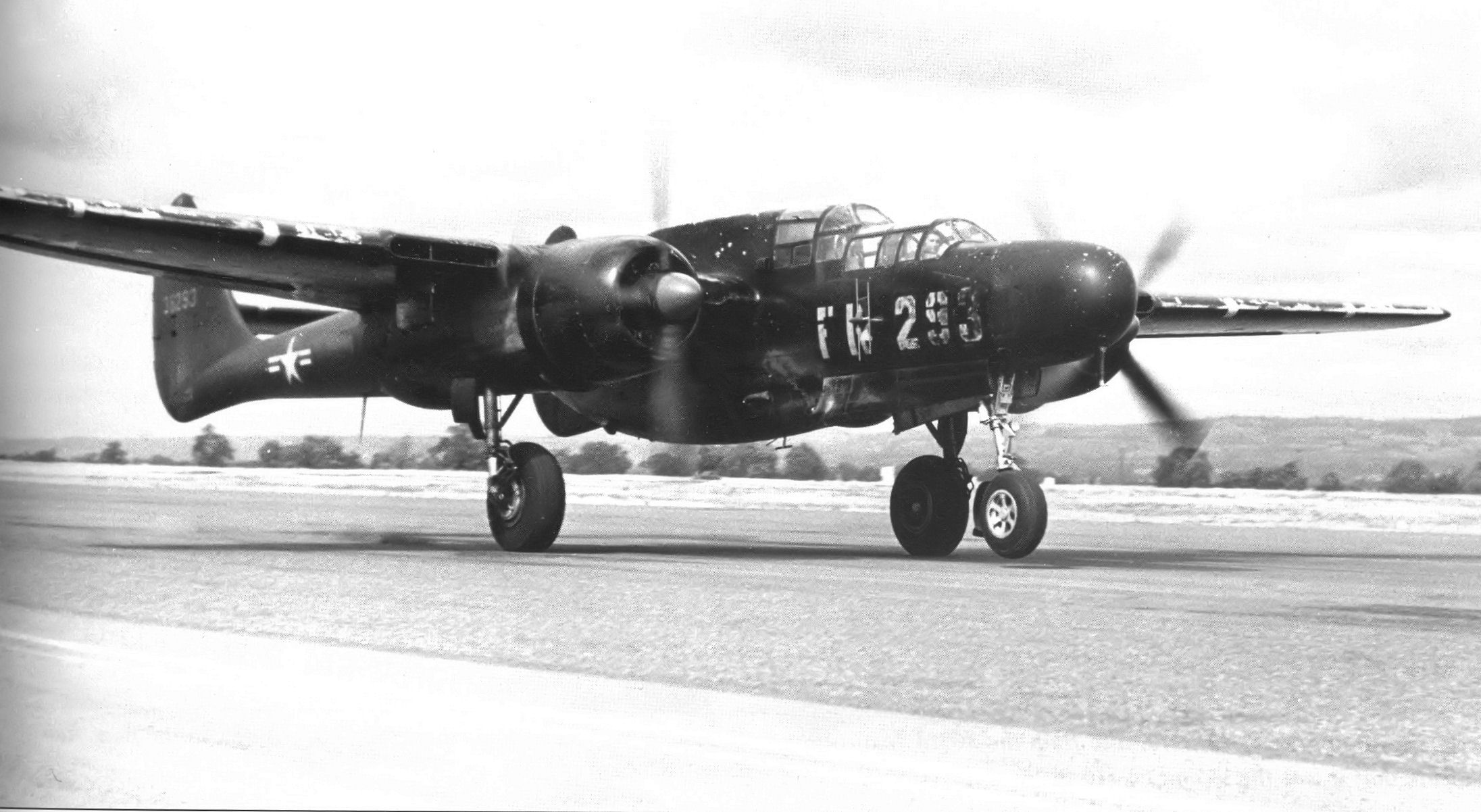
318th Fighter Squadron P-61B (Note: Aircraft is P-61B-20-NO Black Widow serial 43-8293 at Hamilton Field)

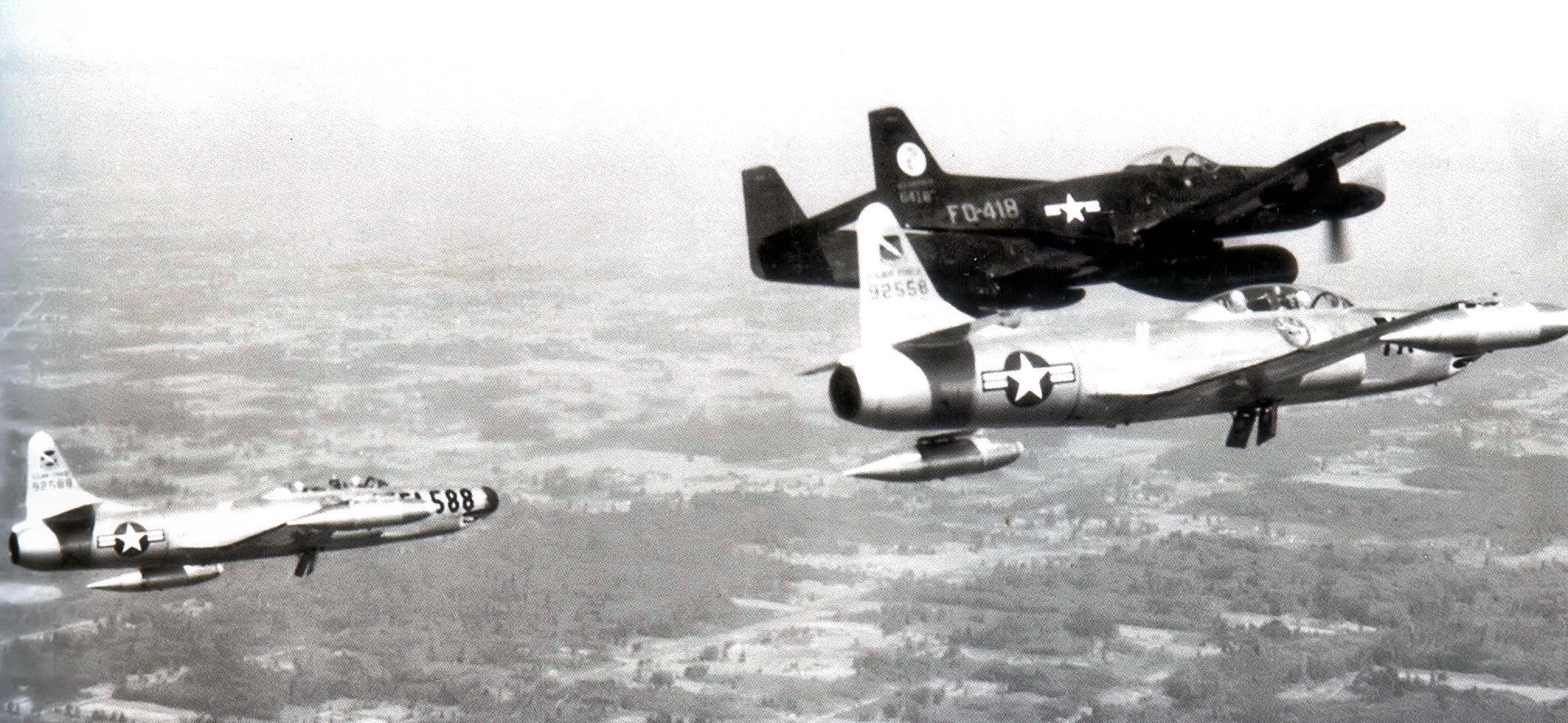
325th Fighter Group F-94 Starfires and F-82 Twin Mustang

The group was inactive from 1945 until 1947, when it was activated as an all-weather fighter group equipped with Northrop P-61 Black Widows. In 1948, the group converted to North American F-82 Twin Mustang aircraft and moved to Washington, to provide air defense for the Atomic Energy Commission Hanford Plant. In 1948, the US Air Force unified operational and support organizations under a single wing under what is called the Hobson Plan. As a result, the 325th Fighter Wing became the parent for the 325th Group and three other supporting groups

Beginning in Spring 1949, it conducted the All Weather Combat Crew Training School, while participating in air defense operations, exercises and training. In 1951, as ADC expanded its mission, the Federalized 123d Fighter-Interceptor Squadron, flying World War II era F-51Ds, was attached to the group (now named the 325th Fighter-Interceptor Group). Although the 123d received some day fighter North American F-86 Sabres in July, it continued to fly Mustangs while attached to the 325th. Meanwhile, the other three squadrons of the 325th converted from their Twin Mustangs to early model Lockheed F-94 Starfires in June and December 1951.

In December 1951, Fifth Air Force, engaged in the Korean War, indicated to Headquarters, United States Air Force that it needed all-weather interceptors to defend the Seoul area. In response, ADC dispatched the group's 319th Fighter-Interceptor Squadron to Suwon Air Base, although the squadron remained assigned to the 325th group. The 325th group and wing inactivated in February 1952 as part of a major Air Defense Command (ADC) reorganization that replaced its fighter wings with regional air defense wings, responding to ADC's difficulty under the existing wing base organizational structure in deploying fighter squadrons to best advantage. Its operational squadrons were transferred to the 4704th Defense Wing at McChord Air Force Base and the 4703d Defense Wing at Larson Air Force Base, Washington.

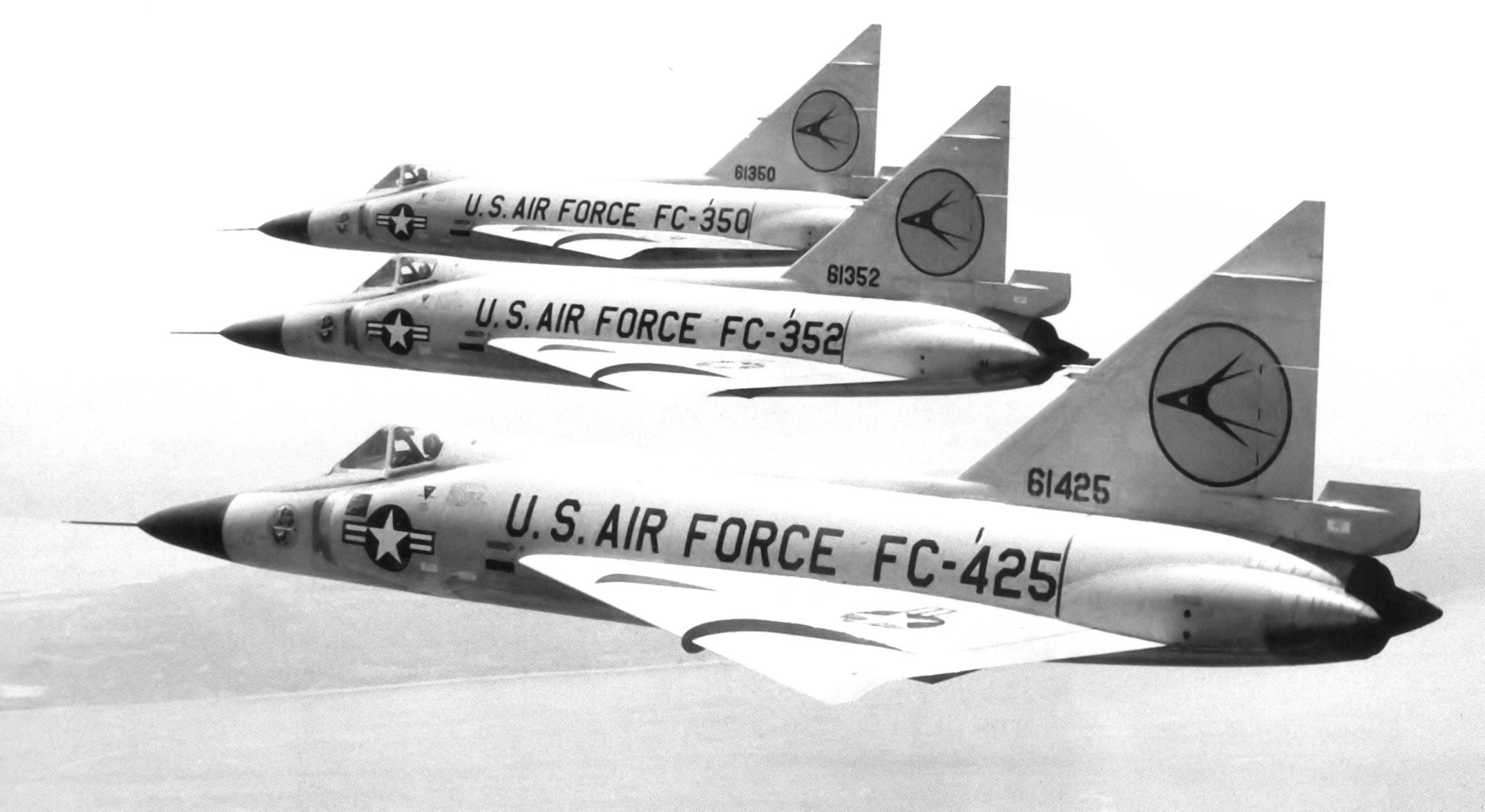
F-102s of the group's 318th FIS in 1958

In 1955 the personnel and equipment of the inactivating 567th Air Defense Group, including the 317th Fighter-Interceptor Squadron were transferred to the newly designated 325th Fighter Group (Air Defense), which activated once again at McChord as result of ADC's Project Arrow, which was designed to bring back on the active list the fighter units which had compiled memorable records in the two world wars. Because one purpose of Project Arrow was to reunite fighter squadrons with their traditional groups, the 318th Fighter-Interceptor Squadron was moved from Presque Isle Air Force Base. to assume the personnel and equipment of the 567th's 465th Fighter-Interceptor Squadron. Both of the group's squadrons flew the radar equipped and rocket armed F-86D version of the Sabre. The 325th served as the USAF "host" group at McChord Air Force Base until October 1956, when the 325th Fighter Wing was reactivated and was assigned several support organizations to fulfill its duties. At the same time it conducted air defense operations.

The group became subordinate to the 325th Fighter Wing again in October 1956 and was non-operational as all group headquarters personnel were used to man the wing headquarters until about June 1957. The squadrons upgraded to Convair F-102 Delta Daggers, the 317th Squadron in December 1956 and the 318th in March 1957. In August 1957, the 317th Squadron moved to Alaska and was reassigned from the group, while the 64th Fighter-Interceptor Squadron simultaneously moved from Alaska to McChord. The group regained control over its tactical squadrons in June 1957 and continued air defense operations of the wing, with annual squadron deployments to Tyndall Air Force Base, Florida for firing practice. Just before the group was discontinued, the 64th Squadron moved to Paine Field, Washington, where it was reassigned to the 326th Fighter Group. The group was in the process of converting to Convair F-106 Delta Darts when it was discontinued in March 1960, with its remaining tactical squadron being transferred directly to 325th Fighter Wing control.

=== Reactivation ===
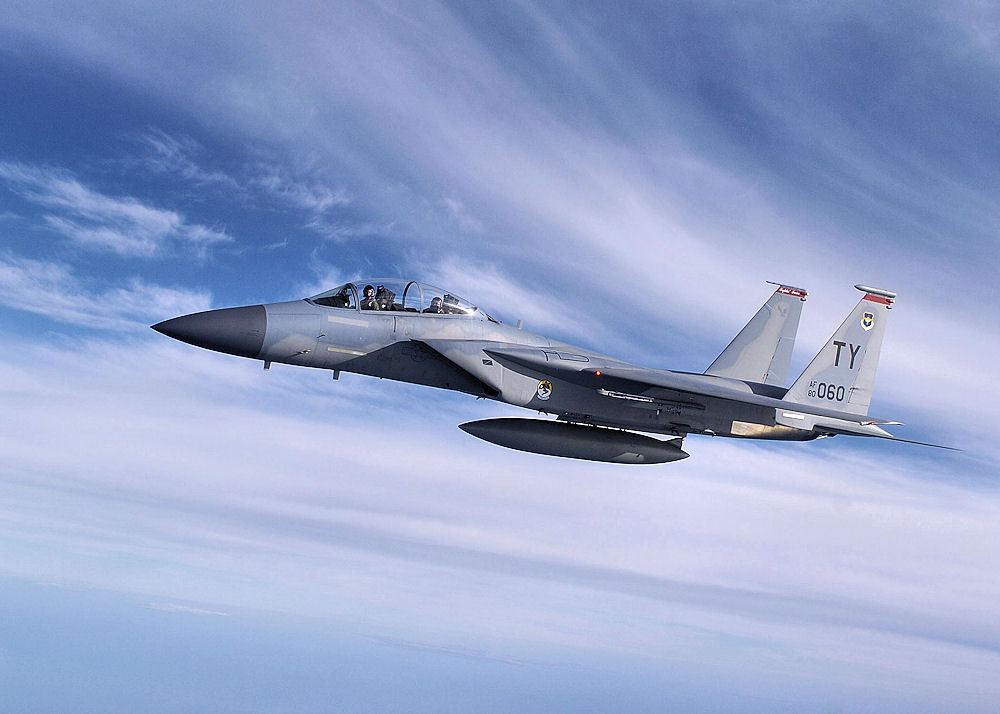
McDonnell Douglas F-15D Eagle, 325th Operations Group

On 1 September 1991, the group was redesignated the 325th Operations Group and activated when the 325th Fighter Wing implemented the USAF Objective Wing organization. The 325th Group was assigned control of the wing's tactical units. The group was originally part of Tactical Air Command, but in an Air Force realignment of advanced crew training responsibilities, it transferred to Air Education and Training Command in June 1992. The group mission was to train McDonnell Douglas F-15 Eagle pilots. It continued this mission until 2010, adding F-22 Raptor training in 2003. When F-15 training ended, the group was reduced to a single flying squadron. The group also conducted battle management training through its 325th Air Control Squadron. This mission ended in October 2012 and transferred to the 33d Operations Group.

In October 2012, the Air Force combined both combat and training F-22 Raptor squadrons into a single group, and realigned the group under Air Combat Command.

== Lineage ==
- Constituted as the 325th Fighter Group on 24 June 1942

Activated on 3 August 1942
Inactivated on 28 October 1945

- Redesignated 325th Fighter Group (All Weather) on 2 May 1947

Activated on 21 May 1947
Redesignated: 325th Fighter Group, All Weather, on 10 May 1948
Redesignated: 325th Fighter-All Weather Group on 20 January 1950
Redesignated: 325th Fighter-Interceptor Group on 1 May 1951
Inactivated on 6 February 1952

- Redesignated 325th Fighter Group (Air Defense) on 20 June 1955

Activated on 18 August 1955
Discontinued on 25 March 1960 (Note: The group is not related to a 325th Fighter Group (Air Defense), Provisional that was organized at McChord on 1 November 1960 and discontinued on 1 February 1961. see Cornett & Johnson, p. 78.)

- Redesignated 325th Tactical Training Group on 31 July 1985 (remained inactive)
- Redesignated 325th Operations Group on 1 September 1991

Activated on 1 September 1991.

== Assignments ==
- I Fighter Command, 3 August 1942
- Boston Air Defense Wing, 11 August 1942
- Twelfth Air Force, 13 February 1943
- Northwest African Tactical Air Force, 18 February 1943
- Northwest African Strategic Air Force, 14 March 1943
- 47th Bombardment Wing, 27 March 1943
- 2686 Medium Bombardment Wing (Provisional), 7 June 1943
- 42d Bombardment Wing, 24 August 1943
- 5th Bombardment Wing, 22 October 1943
- 306th Bombardment (later, 306th Fighter) Wing, 27 March 1944
- 305th Bombardment Wing, 13 June 1945
- 49th Bombardment Wing, Heavy, August 1945
- Army Service Forces (for inactivation), c. 9–28 October 1945
- First Air Force, 21 May 1947
- Fourth Air Force, 2 December 1947
- 325th Fighter Wing, All Weather (later, 325th Fighter-All Weather Wing, 325th Fighter-Interceptor Wing), 9 June 1948 – 6 February 1952
- 25th Air Division, 18 August 1955
- 325th Tactical Training Wing (later, 325th Fighter Wing), 1 September 1991–present

== Components ==
Operational Squadrons

- 1st Tactical Fighter Training (later, 1st Fighter): 1 September 1991 – 15 December 2006;
- 2d Tactical Fighter Training Squadron (later 2d Fighter Squadron, 2d Fighter Training Squadron): 1 September 1991 – 11 May 2010, 22 August 2014 – 2024
- 43d Fighter Squadron: 1 October 2002 – 2024
- 64th Fighter-Interceptor Squadron: 15 August 1957 – 15 March 1960
- 95th Tactical Fighter Training (later, 95th Fighter): 1 September 1991 – 21 September 2010; 11 October 2013 – present
- 123d Fighter Squadron, Single Engine (later 123d Fighter-Interceptor Squadron): attached 12 February 1951 – 6 February 1952
- 317th Fighter Squadron (later 317th Squadron, All Weather; 317th Fighter-All Weather Squadron; 317th Fighter-Interceptor Squadron): 3 August 1942 – 28 October 1945; 31 December 1947 – 6 February 1952; 18 August 1955 – 15 August 1957 (attached to 325th Fighter Wing 18 October 1956-c. June 1957)
- 318th Fighter Squadron (later 318th Fighter Squadron, All Weather; 318th Fighter-All Weather Squadron; 318th Fighter-Interceptor Squadron): 3 August 1942 – 28 October 1945; 21 May 1947 – 6 February 1952; 18 August 1955 – 25 March 1960 (attached to 325th Fighter Wing 18 October 1956-c. June 1957)
- 319th Fighter Squadron (later 319th Fighter Squadron, All Weather; 319th Fighter-All Weather Squadron; 319th Fighter-Interceptor Squadron): 3 August 1942 – 28 October 1945; 1 July 1949 – 6 February 1952 (attached to the 101st Fighter-Interceptor Wing 14 December 1951 – 6 February 1952).

Support Units

- 325th USAF Hospital: 18 August 1955 - 18 October 1956
- 325th Air Police Squadron: 18 August 1955 – 18 October 1956
- 325th Armament & Electronics Maintenance Squadron: 15 November 1958 - 25 June 1960
- 325th Consolidated Aircraft Maintenance Squadron: 8 September 1957 - 15 November 1958
- 325th Field Maintenance Squadron: 18 August 1955 - 18 October 1956
- 325th Food Service Squadron: 18 August 1955 – 18 October 1956
- 325th Installations Squadron: 18 August 1955 – 18 October 1956
- 325th Transportation Squadron: 18 August 1955 – 18 October 1956
- 325th Organizational Maintenance Squadron: 15 November 1958 – 25 June 1960
- 325th Operations Squadron (later 325th Operations Support Squadron): 18 August 1955 – 18 October 1956, 1 September 1991 – present
- 325th Supply Squadron: 18 August 1955 – 18 October 1956
- 325th Tactical Training Squadron (later 325th Training Squadron, 325th Air Control Squadron, 325th Training Support Squadron), 1 September 1991 – 1 October 2012
- 625th Field Maintenance Squadron: 15 November 1958 – 25 June 1960

== Stations ==
- Mitchel Field, New York, 3 August 1942
- Hillsgrove Army Air Field, Rhode Island, c. 31 August 1942
- Camp Kilmer, New Jersey, 23 January – 7 February 1943
- Tafaraoui Airfield, Algeria, 28 February 1943
- Montesquieu Airfield, Algeria, 5 April 1943
- Souk-el-Khemis Airfield, Tunisia, 3 June 1943
- Mateur Airfield, Tunisia, 19 June 1943
- Soliman Airfield, Tunisia, 4 November 1943
- Foggia Airfield, Italy, 11 December 1943
- Lesina Airfield, Italy, 29 March 1944
- Rimini Airfield, Italy, c. 5 March 1945
- Mondolfo Airfield, Italy, April 1945
- Vincenzo Airfield, Italy, July-9 October 1945
- Camp Kilmer, New Jersey, 26–28 October 1945
- Mitchel Field, New York, 21 May 1947
- Hamilton Field (later, Hamilton Air Force Base), California, 2 December 1947
- Moses Lake Air Force Base, Washnington, 26 November 1948
- McChord Air Force Base, Washington, 23 April 1950 – 6 February 1952; 18 August 1955 – 25 March 1960
- Tyndall Air Force Base, Florida, 1 September 1991 – present

== Aircraft ==
- P-40 Warhawk, 1942–1943
- P-47 Thunderbolt, 1943–1944)
- P-51D Mustang, 1944–1945, 1951–1952
- P-61 Black Widow, 1947–1948
- F-82 Twin Mustang, 1948–1951
- F-94A Starfire, 1950–1952
- F-86E Sabre, 1951
- F-86D Sabre, 1955–1957
- F-102 Delta Dagger, 1956–1960
- F-106 Delta Dart, 1960
- McDonnell Douglas F-15 Eagle, 1991–2010
- Lockheed Martin F-22 Raptor, 2003–present
- Lockheed Martin F-35A Lightning II, 2023–present

== Awards and campaigns ==
Award streamer	Award	Dates	Notes
	Distinguished Unit Citation	30 July 1943	Sardinia, 325th Fighter Group
	Distinguished Unit Citation	30 January 1944	Italy, 325th Fighter Group
	Air Force Outstanding Unit Award	1 July 1993–30 June 1995	355th Operations Group
	Air Force Outstanding Unit Award	1 July 1995–30 June 1996	355th Operations Group
	Air Force Outstanding Unit Award	1 July 1996–30 June 1997	355th Operations Group
	Air Force Outstanding Unit Award	1 July 1997–30 June 1999	355th Operations Group
	Air Force Outstanding Unit Award	1 July 1999–30 June 2001	355th Operations Group
	Air Force Outstanding Unit Award	1 July 2001–30 June 2002	355th Operations Group
	Air Force Outstanding Unit Award	1 July 2002–30 June 2004	355th Operations Group
	Air Force Outstanding Unit Award	1 July 2004–30 June 2005	355th Operations Group
	Air Force Outstanding Unit Award	1 July 2005–30 June 2006	355th Operations Group
	Air Force Outstanding Unit Award	1 July 2006–30 June 2007	355th Operations Group
	Air Force Outstanding Unit Award	1 July 2008–30 June 2009	355th Operations Group

Campaign Streamer	Campaign	Dates	Notes
	American Theater without inscription	3 August 1942 – 7 February 1946	325th Fighter Group
	Tunisia	28 February 1943 – 13 May 1943	325th Fighter Group
	Sicily	14 May 1943 – 17 August 1943	325th Fighter Group
	Naples-Foggia	18 August 1943 – 21 January 1944	325th Fighter Group
	Rome-Arno	22 January 1944 – 9 September 1944	325th Fighter Group
	Southern France	15 August 1944 – 14 September 1944	325th Fighter Group
	North Apennines	10 September 1944 – 4 April 1945	325th Fighter Group
	Central Europe	22 March 1944 – 21 May 1945	325th Fighter Group
	Po Valley	3 April 1945 – 8 May 1945	325th Fighter Group
	Air Combat, EAME Theater	28 February 1943 – 11 May 1945	325th Fighter Group
	Normandy	6 June 1944 – 24 July 1944	325th Fighter Group
	Northern France	25 July 1944 – 14 September 1944	325th Fighter Group
	Rhineland	15 September 1944 – 21 March 1945	325th Fighter Group
	Air Offensive, Europe	28 February 1943 – 5 June 1944	325th Fighter Group

== See also ==
- List of F-86 Sabre units
- F-94 Starfire units of the United States Air Force
- List of F-106 Delta Dart units of the United States Air Force
- List of F-15 operators
