= 567th Cyberspace Operations Group =

567th Cyberspace Operations Group

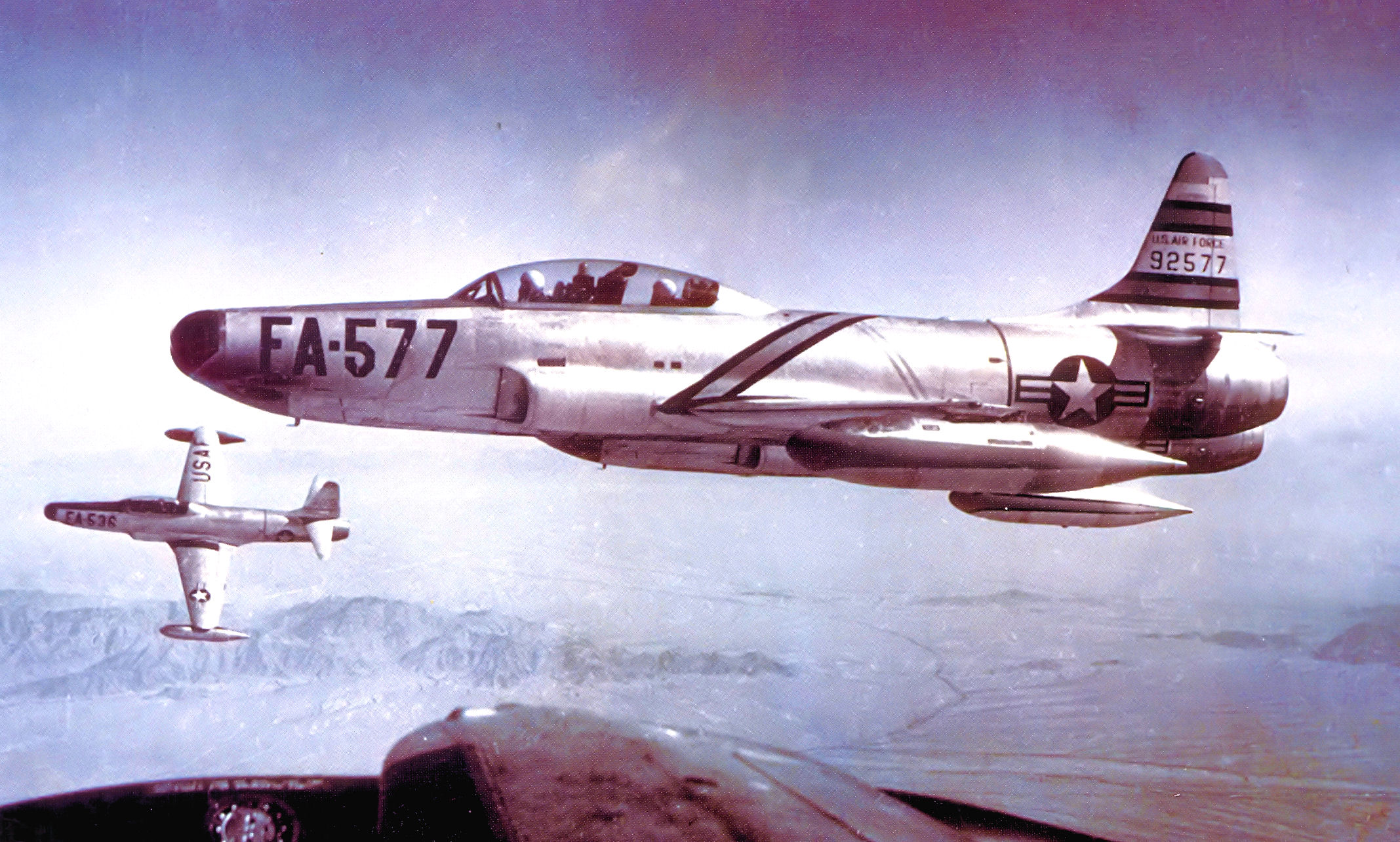
- 317th Fighter-Interceptor Squadron F-94A Starfires of the 317th FIS, stationed at McChord AFB (Note: Aircraft in foreground is Lockheed F-94A-5-LO Starfire, serial 49-2577. This aircraft was later with the Connecticut Air National Guard. It was transferred to the Military Aircraft Storage and Disposal Center on 14 November 1957 and salvaged on 1 September 1958. Baugher, Joe (7 April 2023). "1949 USAF Serial Numbers". Joe Baugher.)
- Active: 1944–1945; 1952–1955; 2018–present
- Country: United States
- Branch: United States Air Force
- Role: Cyberspace Operations
- Part of: Air Combat Command
- Garrison/HQ: Joint Base San Antonio-Lackland
- Decorations: Air Force Outstanding Unit Award

Insignia
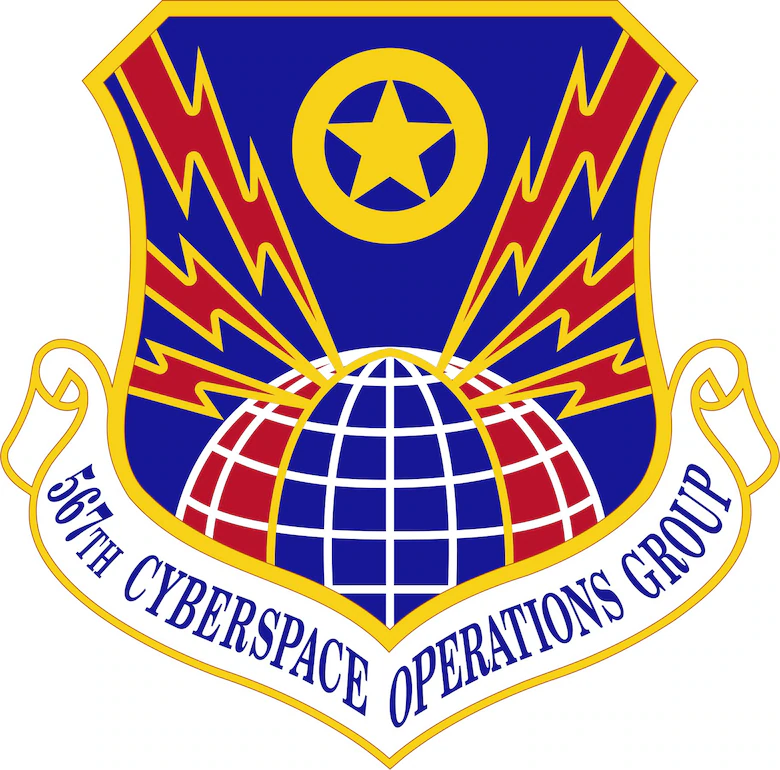
- 567 Cyberspace Operations Gp emblem (Note: Approved 18 September 2019.)

The 567th Cyberspace Operations Group is a United States Air Force organization at Joint Base San Antonio-Lackland, Texas, assigned to the 67th Cyberspace Wing. It was activated in June 2018.

The group's predecessor was activated as the 567th Air Service Group, a support unit for a combat group at the end of World War II. It did not deploy until after the end of the war and was inactivated in 1945.

The group was activated once again in 1952 as the 567th Air Base Group to replace the support elements of the inactivating 325th Fighter-Interceptor Wing. A year later Air Defense Command (ADC) established it as the 567th Air Defense Group, an operational headquarters for fighter-interceptor squadrons as well. It was replaced in 1955 when ADC transferred its mission, equipment, and personnel to the 325th Fighter Group in a project that replaced air defense groups commanding fighter squadrons with fighter groups with distinguished records during World War II. The two groups were consolidated in April 2019.

== Mission ==
The group plans and executes cyberspace operations to assist supported commanders to fight in contested cyberspace environment. It operates to remove adversary cyberspace capabilities; defends the supported commander's key cyberspace assets; and prepares local cyberspace defenders to sustain advanced cyberspace defense tactics, techniques and procedures to ensure freedom of action within friendly cyberspace, while denying adversaries the same.

== History ==
=== World War II ===
The group was activated at Venice Army Air Field, Florida toward the end of World War II as the 567th Air Service Group and trained to support a single combat group in an overseas theater. Its 985th Air Engineering Squadron would provide maintenance that was beyond the capability of the combat group, its 1005th Air Materiel Squadron would handle all supply matters, and its Headquarters & Base Services Squadron would provide other support. It deployed to Guam in the fall of 1945, but arrived after the end of hostilities and was inactivated on 1 December. The unit was disbanded in October 1948.

=== Cold War air defense ===
During the Cold War the group was reconstituted, redesignated as the 567th Air Base Group, and activated at McChord Air Force Base, Washington in 1952 as part of a major reorganization of Air Defense Command (ADC) responding to ADC's difficulty under the existing wing base organizational structure in deploying fighter squadrons to best advantage. It replaced the 325th Air Base Group as the USAF host unit for McChord. while the operational elements of the inactivating 325th Fighter-Interceptor Wing transferred to the 4704th Defense Wing. The group was assigned seven squadrons to perform its support responsibilities. The group also maintained aircraft stationed at McChord.

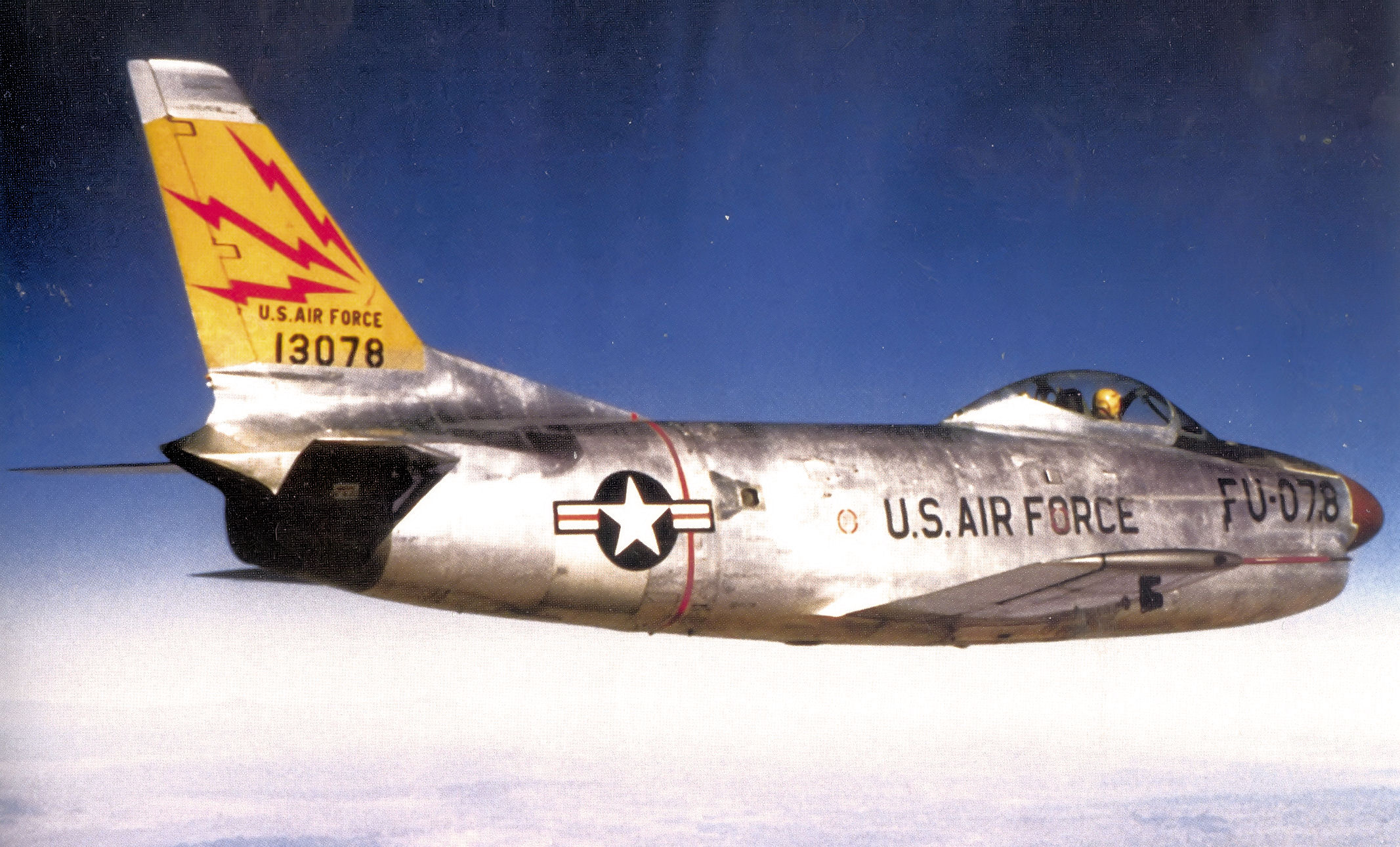
F-86D of the 465th FIS (Note: Aircraft is North American F-86D-20-NA Sabre, serial 51-3078. This plane was destroyed in a midair collision on 14 November 1954. Baugher, Joe (7 April 2023). "1951 USAF Serial Numbers". Joe Baugher.)

The group was redesignated as the 567th Air Defense Group and assumed responsibility for air defense of the Northwest United States. It was assigned the 317th and 318th Fighter-Interceptor Squadrons (FIS), flying early model Lockheed F-94 Starfire aircraft armed with 20 mm cannon, from the 4704th Defense Wing as its operational elements. The same day, the 465th FIS, flying radar equipped and Mighty Mouse rocket armed North American F-86D Sabres was activated as the group's third operational squadron. In July 1953, the 318th FIS moved to Greenland and was transferred from the group. In December 1953, the 317th FIS converted to F-86's.

The group was inactivated in 1955 and replaced by the 325th Fighter Group (Air Defense) as result of ADC's Project Arrow, which was designed to bring back on the active list the fighter units which had compiled memorable records in the two world wars. The group was disbanded once again in September 1984.

=== Cyberspace operations ===
On 29 June 2018, the Air Force activated the 567th Cyberspace Operations Group at Scott Air Force Base, Illinois. Four of its squadrons are located at Joint Base San Antonio, Texas. The 835th and 837th Cyberspace Operations Squadrons are located at Scott, where the group headquarters was originally located. In July 2020, the headquarters joined the other squadrons in Texas. Three months later, two of its squadrons were transferred to the new 867th Cyberspace Operations Group at Fort Meade, Maryland.

== Lineage ==
567th Air Defense Group

- Established as the 567th Air Service Group on 22 November 1944

Activated on 7 December 1944
Inactivated 1 November 1945
Disbanded on 8 October 1948

- Reconstituted and redesignated 567th Air Base Group on 3 January 1952

Activated on 1 February 1952

- Redesignated as 567th Air Defense Group on 16 February 1953

Inactivated on 18 August 1955
Disbanded on 27 September 1984
Reconstituted on 5 April 2019 and consolidated with the 567th Cyberspace Operations Group as the 567th Cyberspace Operations Group

567th Cyberspace Operations Group
Established as the 567th Cyberspace Operations Group on 22 June 2018
Activated on 29 June 2018
Consolidated with the 567th Air Defense Group on 5 April 2019

=== Assignments ===
- Warner Robins Air Technical Service Command, 7 December 1944 – 16 August 1945
- United States Army Air Forces, Central Pacific Area, 12 September 1945
- Twentieth Air Force, 18 September 1945 – 1 November 1945
- Western Air Defense Force, 1 February 1952
- 4704th Defense Wing, 6 February 1952 – 8 October 1954
- 25th Air Division, 8 October 1954 – 18 August 1955
- 67th Cyberspace Wing, 29 June 2018

=== Components ===
Operational Squadrons

- 92d Cyberspace Operations Squadron, 18 September 2020 – present
- 317th Fighter Interceptor Squadron, 16 February 1953 – 18 August 1955
- 318th Fighter Interceptor Squadron, 16 February 1953 – 1 July 1953
- 465th Fighter-Interceptor Squadron, 16 February 1953 – 18 August 1955
- 833d Cyberspace Operations Squadron, 29 June 2018 – 18 September 2020
- 834th Cyberspace Operations Squadron, 29 June 2018 – present
- 835th Cyberspace Operations Squadron, 29 June 2018 – present
- 836th Cyberspace Operations Squadron, 29 June 2018 – 18 September 2020
- 837th Cyberspace Operations Squadron, 29 June 2018 – present

Support Squadrons

- 567th Air Police Squadron, 1 February 1952 – 18 August 1955
- 567th Food Service Squadron, 1 February 1952 – 18 August 1955
- 567th Field Maintenance Squadron, 1 February 1952 – 18 August 1955
- 567th Installations Squadron, 1 February 1952 – 18 August 1955
- 567th Medical Squadron (later 567th USAF Hospital), 1 February 1952 – 18 August 1955
- 567th Motor Vehicle Squadron, 1 February 1952 – 18 August 1955
- 567th Operations Squadron, 1 February 1952 – 18 August 1955
- 567th Supply Squadron, 1 February 1952 – 18 August 1955
- 985th Air Engineering Squadron, 7 December 1944 – c. May 1945
- 1005th Air Materiel Squadron, 7 December 1944 – 1 November 1945

=== Stations ===
- Venice Army Air Field, Florida, 7 December 1944 – 14 August 1945
- Fort Lawton, Washington, 19–25 August 1945
- Guam, Mariana Islands 12 September–1 December 1945
- McChord Air Force Base, Washington, 1 February 1952 – 18 August 1955
- Scott Air Force Base, Illinois, 29 June 2018
- Joint Base San Antonio-Lackland, 28 July 2020 – present

=== Aircraft ===
- North American F-86D Sabre, 1953–1955
- Lockheed F-94A Starfighter, 1953

=== Commanders ===
- Unknown, 7 December 1944 – 19 December 1944
- Lt Col. William H. Worley, 19 December 1944 – 1945
- Unknown 1 February 1952 – 18 August 1955

== See also ==
- Aerospace Defense Command Fighter Squadrons
- List of F-86 Sabre units
- F-94 Starfire units of the United States Air Force
- List of cyber warfare forces
