= F-94 Starfire units of the United States Air Force =

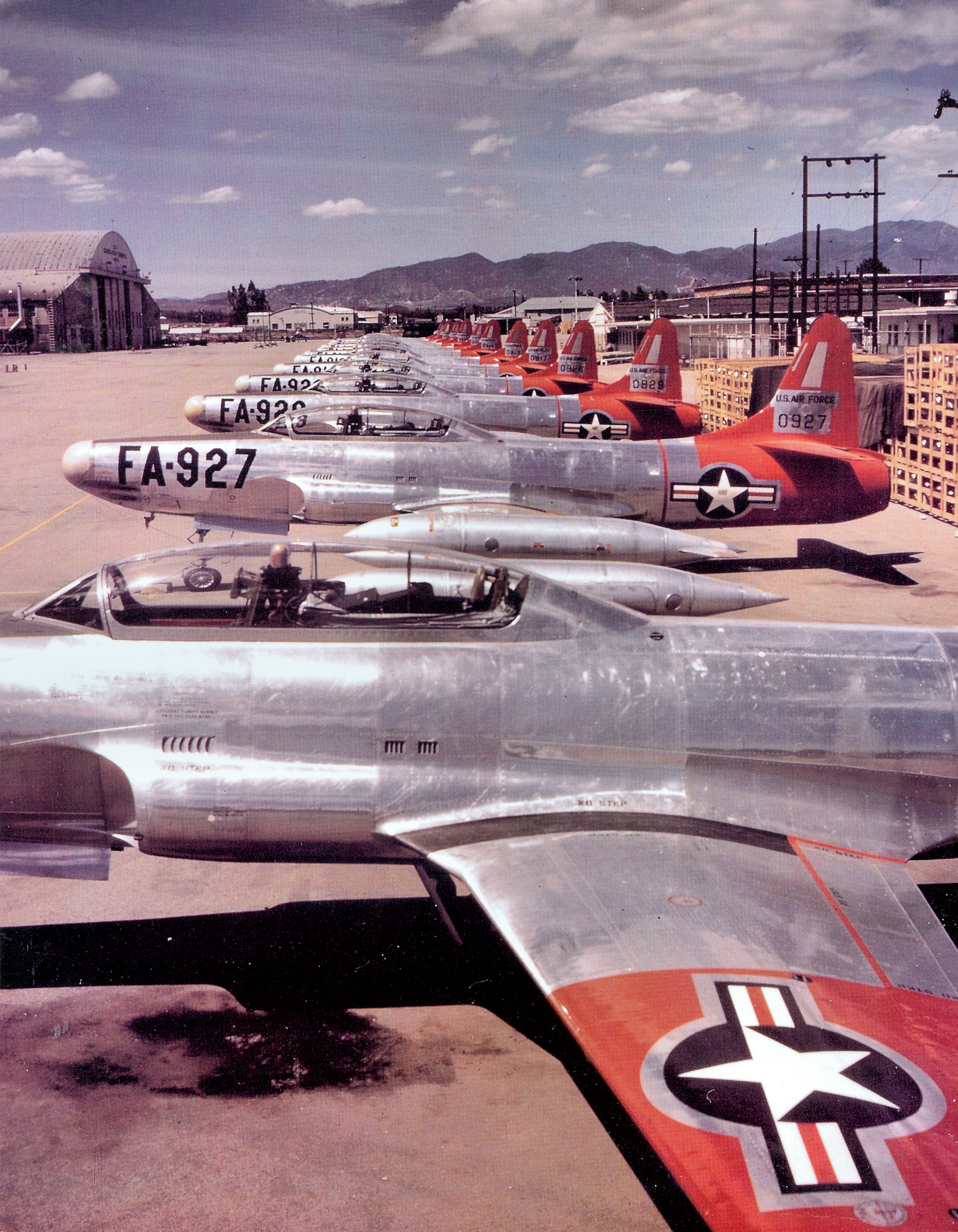
F-94B Starfires of the 66th Fighter-Interceptor Squadron, Elmendorf AFB, Alaska, 1952

The Lockheed F-94 Starfire was the first United States Air Force jet-powered day/night all-weather interceptor. It was also the first operational USAF fighter equipped with an afterburner. Introduced in February 1950, its primary user was the Air Defense Command. It also saw service in the Korean War, replacing the F-82G Twin Mustang used by Far East Air Force in 1952. The aircraft had a relatively short operational life, being retired by the active-duty Air Force in November 1957 and the Air National Guard by June 1959.

== Squadrons ==
=== United States Air Force ===
Squadron	Unit	Model	Service	Notes/Subsequent History
2nd Fighter-All Weather Squadron; 2nd Fighter-Interceptor Squadron	52d Fighter-Interceptor Group; 4709th Air Defense Wing; 568th Air Defense Group	F-94A	June 1950-July 1953	ADC; Converted from F-82F Twin Mustang; Converted to F-86D Sabre
4th Fighter-All Weather Squadron; 4th Fighter-Interceptor Squadron	6302d Air Base Group; 6351st Air Base Wing	F-94B	Apr 1951-Feb 1954	FEAF; Replaced F-82G Twin Mustangs; Combat in Korea Jan-June 1953; Converted to F-86D Sabre
5th Fighter-All Weather Squadron; 5th Fighter-Interceptor Squadron	52d Fighter-Interceptor Group; 4709th Air Defense Wing; 568th Air Defense Group	F-94A	June 1950-July 1953	ADC; Converted from F-82F Twin Mustang; Converted to F-86D Sabre
27th Fighter-Interceptor Squadron	4711th Air Defense Wing; 14th Fighter Group; 4727th Air Defense Group	F-94C	Apr 1954-Nov 1957	ADC; Converted from F-86A Sabre; Converted to F-102A Delta Dagger
29th Fighter-Interceptor Squadron	29th Air Division	F-94C	Nov 1953-May 1957	ADC; New unit; Converted to F-89H Scorpion
46th Fighter-Interceptor Squadron	4710th Air Defense Wing; 4709th Air Defense Wing; 4621st Air Defense Wing; New York Air Defense Sector; 4728th Air Defense Group	F-94B; F-94C	Nov 1952-Jul 1958	ADC; Replaced PA ANG 148th Fighter-Interceptor Squadron after Korean War federalization; Converted to F-94C Apr 1953; Inactivated July 1958
48th Fighter-Interceptor Squadron	4710th Air Defense Wing; 85th Air Division	F-94C	Jul 1953-Apr 1957	ADC; Converted from F-84G Thunderjet; Converted to F-106 Delta Dart
58th Fighter-Interceptor Squadron	4707th Defense Wing; 564th Air Defense Group	F-94B; F-94C	Feb 1952-Jun 1955	ADC; Converted from F-86A Sabre; Converted to F-94C Jun 1953; Converted to F-89D/H Scorpion
59th Fighter-Interceptor Squadron	33d Fighter-Interceptor Wing; 4707th Defense Wing; 64th Air Division (NEAC)	F-94A; F-94B	Dec 1950 1951-Jun 1955	ADC; New unit; Received F-94As in December 1950; upgraded to F-94Bs in March 1951; Converted to F-89D Scorpion
60th Fighter-Interceptor Squadron	33d Fighter Group; 4735th Air Defense Group	F-94C	Aug 1955-Aug 1957	ADC; Converted from F-86D Sabre; Converted to F-101B Voodoo
61st Fighter-Interceptor Squadron	56th Fighter-Interceptor Group; 4708th Defense Wing; 575th Air Defense Group; 64th Air Division (NEAC)	F-94A; F-94B	July 1950-Jun 1954	ADC; New Unit; Initially received F-94As, upgraded to F-94Bs in March 1951; Converted to F-89D Scorpion
64th Fighter-Interceptor Squadron	57th Fighter-Interceptor Group; 10th Air Division	F-94B	Jan 1951-Jun 1953	AAC; Replaced F-80C Shooting Star; Converted to F-89 Scorpion
66th Fighter-Interceptor Squadron	57th Fighter-Interceptor Group; 10th Air Division	F-94B	Jan 1951-Jun 1954	AAC; Replaced F-80C Shooting Star; Converted to F-89 Scorpion
68th Fighter-All Weather Squadron; 68th Fighter-Interceptor Squadron	6160th Air Base Wing; 8th Fighter-Bomber Wing	F-94B	Mar 1951-Sep 1954	FEAF; Replaced F-82G Twin Mustangs; Combat in Korea Jan-June 1953; Converted to F-86D Sabre
74th Fighter-Interceptor Squadron	4711th Air Defense Wing; 528th Air Defense Group; 64th Air Division (NEAC)	F-94B; F-94C	Dec 1952-Aug 1954	ADC; Converted from F-89C; Converted to F-89C
82nd Fighter-Interceptor Squadron	4703d Air Defense Wing; 4704th Air Defense Wing; 4702d Air Defense Wing; Iceland Air Defense Force (MATS)	F-94B	Feb 1952-Apr 1954	ADC; Converted from F-84D Thunderjet; Converted to F-89D Scorpion
84th Fighter-Interceptor Squadron	566th Air Defense Group; 78th Fighter Group	F-94B; F-94C	Apr 1953-May 1956	ADC; Converted from F-89B Scorpion; Converted to F-94C Dec 1953; Converted to F-89D/H Scorpion
95th Fighter-Interceptor Squadron	4710th Air Defense Wing	F-94B	Nov 1952-May 1953	ADC; Replaced DC ANG 121st Fighter-Interceptor Squadron after Korean War federalization; Converted to F-86D Sabre
96th Fighter-Interceptor Squadron	4710th Air Defense Wing; 525th Air Defense Group	F-94B; F-94C	Nov 1952-Nov 1957	ADC; Replaced DE ANG 142d Fighter-Interceptor Squadron after Korean War federalization; Converted to F-94C Jul 1953; Inactivated November 1957
97th Fighter-Interceptor Squadron	82d Fighter Group	F-94C	Dec 1955-Nov 1957	ADC; Converted from F-86D Sabre; Inactivated November 1957
121st Fighter-Interceptor Squadron	113th Fighter-Interceptor Wing; 4710th Air Defense Wing	F-94B	Oct 1951-Nov 1952	ADC; Federalized DC ANG Squadron during Korean War, initially equipped with F-84C Thunderjet; Converted to F-94B Oct 1951; Returned to District control 1 November 1952; equipment transferred to 95th Fighter-Interceptor Squadron.
142nd Fighter-Interceptor Squadron	113th Fighter-Interceptor Wing; 4710th Air Defense Wing	F-94B	Oct 1951-Nov 1952	ADC; Federalized DE ANG Squadron during Korean War, initially equipped with F-84C Thunderjet; Converted to F-94B Oct 1951; Returned to State control 1 November 1952; equipment transferred to 96th Fighter-Interceptor Squadron.
148th Fighter-Interceptor Squadron	113th Fighter-Interceptor Wing; 4710th Air Defense Wing	F-94B	Oct 1951-Nov 1952	ADC; Federalized PA ANG Squadron during Korean War, initially equipped with F-84C Thunderjet; Converted to F-94B Oct 1951; Returned to State control 1 November 1952; equipment transferred to 46th Fighter-Interceptor Squadron.
317th Fighter-All Weather Squadron; 317th Fighter-Interceptor Squadron	325th Fighter-Interceptor Wing; 4704th Air Defense Wing; 567th Air Defense Group	F-94A	May 1950-Dec 1953	ADC; Converted from F-82F Twin Mustang; Converted to F-86D Sabre
318th Fighter-All Weather Squadron; 318th Fighter-Interceptor Squadron	325th Fighter-Interceptor Wing; 4704th Air Defense Wing; 567th Air Defense Group; 528th Air Defense Group	F-94A	May 1950-Aug 1954	ADC; Converted from F-82F Twin Mustang; Converted to F-89D Scorpion
319th Fighter-All Weather Squadron; 319th Fighter-Interceptor Squadron	325th Fighter-Interceptor Wing; 101st Fighter-Interceptor Wing; Fifth Air Force (FEAF); 4706th Air Defense Wing; 58th Air Division	F-94A; F-94B; F-94C	Jun 1951-Nov 1957	ADC; Converted from F-82F Twin Mustang; Converted to F-94B March 1952; Converted to F-94C November 1955; Converted to F-89J Scorpion
332nd Fighter-Interceptor Squadron	525th Air Defense Group	F-94C	Mar 1953-Aug 1955	ADC; New unit; Converted to F-86D Sabre
339th Fighter-All Weather Squadron; 339th Fighter-Interceptor Squadron	6162d Air Base Wing; 35th Fighter-Interceptor Wing; 49th Fighter-Bomber Wing	F-94B	Apr 1951-Jun 1955	FEAF; Replaced F-82G Twin Mustangs; Combat in Korea Jan-June 1953; Converted to F-86D Sabre
354th Fighter-Interceptor Squadron	533d Air Defense Group<	F-94C	Jul 1953-Aug 1955	ADC; Converted from F-51 Mustang; Converted to F-86D Sabre
437th Fighter-Interceptor Squadron	4707th Air Defense Wing; 564th Air Defense Group	F-94C	Nov 1952-Jun 1955; Aug 1955-Apr 1956	ADC; New unit; Converted to F-89D Scorpion June 1955; Converted to F-94C August 1955; Converted to F-89J Scorpion
438th Fighter-Interceptor Squadron	534th Air Defense Group; 507th Fighter Group	F-94B	Apr 1953-May 1957	ADC; New unit; Converted to F-106 Delta Dart
449th Fighter-All Weather Squadron; 449th Fighter Interceptor Squadron	5001st Composite Wing; 11th Air Division	F-94A	Jun 1950-Jun 1954	AAC; Replaced F-82H Twin Mustangs; Converted to F-89 Scorpion
497th Fighter-Interceptor Squadron	503d Air Defense Group	F-94B; F-94A	Feb 1953-Jul 1954	ADC; New unit; Converted to F-94A December 1953; Converted to F-89D Scorpion
3552nd Training Squadron	3550th Training Group	F-94A; F-94B; F-94C	Dec 1951-Jun 1958	ATC: Training squadron at Moody AFB Georgia

=== Air National Guard ===
Squadron	Unit	Model	Service	Notes/Subsequent History
101st Fighter-Interceptor Squadron	102d Fighter Group	F-94B; F-94C	1952-1958	MA Air National Guard; Carried green markings, known as the "Irish Squadron"; Received F-94C December 1957; Converted to F-84B Thunderstreak
102nd Fighter-Interceptor Squadron	106th Fighter-Interceptor Group	F-94B	1954-1958	NY Air National Guard; Converted to MC-119J Aeromedical Flying Boxcar
103rd Fighter-Interceptor Squadron	111th Fighter-Interceptor Group	F-94B; F-94C	1956-1959	PA Air National Guard; Received F-94Bs from ID 190th FIS; received F-94Cs October 1947 from MA ANG Converted to F-89H Scorpion June 1959
109th Fighter-Interceptor Squadron	133d Fighter-Interceptor Group	F-94A/B	1954-1958	MN Air National Guard; Received F-94As which were upgraded to F-94B standards along with F-94Bs. Squadron operated from Volk Field, Wisconsin due to jet restrictions at Wold Chamberlain Airport, Minneapolis. Inactivated January 1958
114th Fighter-Interceptor Squadron	106th Fighter-Interceptor Group	F-94B	1957-1958	NY Air National Guard; Inactivated and transferred to OR ANG.
116th Fighter-Interceptor Squadron	142d Fighter-Interceptor Wing	F-94A/B	1954-1957	WA Air National Guard; Received F-94As which were upgraded to F-94B standards along with F-94Bs. Converted to F-89D Scorpion
118th Fighter-Interceptor Squadron	103d Fighter-Interceptor Group	F-94B	1956-1958	CT Air National Guard; Last ANG squadron to be equipped with Starfires in Spring, 1956; Converted to F-86H Sabre Spring 1958.
123rd Fighter-Interceptor Squadron	142d Fighter-Interceptor Group	F-94A/B	1955-1957	OR Air National Guard; Received F-94As which were upgraded to F-94B standards along with F-94Bs. Converted to F-89D Scorpion
131st Fighter-Interceptor Squadron	102d Fighter-Interceptor Group	F-94B; F-94C	1954-1958	MA Air National Guard; Carried Red/White markings, known as the "Polish Squadron". Received F-94C December 1957 (319th FIS). Converted to F-89J Scorpion
132nd Fighter-Interceptor Squadron	101st Fighter-Interceptor Group	F-94A/B	1953-1957	ME Air National Guard; Received F-94As which were upgraded to F-94B standards. Converted to F-89D Scorpion
133rd Fighter-Interceptor Squadron	101st Fighter-Interceptor Group	F-94A/B	1954-1958	NH Air National Guard; Received F-94As which were upgraded to F-94B standards. Converted to F-86L Sabre
134th Fighter-Interceptor Squadron	101st Fighter-Interceptor Group	F-94A/B	1952-1958	VT Air National Guard; Received F-94As which were upgraded to F-94B standards. Converted to F-89D Scorpion
136th Fighter-Interceptor Squadron	107th Fighter-Interceptor Group	F-94A/B	1954-1957	NY Air National Guard; Received F-94As which were upgraded to F-94B standards. Converted to F-86H Sabre
137th Fighter-Interceptor Squadron	107th Fighter-Interceptor Group	F-94A/B (Note: The first ANG F-94s were F-94As. The F-94As were sent to Lockheed for modification to F-94B standards and then returned to the ANG as B models)	1953-1957	NY Air National Guard; First ANG unit equipped with F-94 Converted to F-86H Sabre
138th Fighter-Interceptor Squadron	107th Fighter-Interceptor Group	F-94A/B	1953-1957	NY Air National Guard; Received F-94As which were upgraded to F-94B standards. Converted to F-86H Sabre
139th Fighter-Interceptor Squadron	107th Fighter-Interceptor Group	F-94A/B	1954-1957	NY Air National Guard; Received F-94As which were upgraded to F-94B standards. Converted to F-86H Sabre
175th Fighter-Interceptor Squadron	133d Fighter-Interceptor Group	F-94A/B; F-94C	1954-1958	SD Air National Guard; Received F-94As which were upgraded to F-94B standards along with F-94Bs; upgraded to F-94C May 1956. Converted to F-89J Scorpion
178th Fighter-Interceptor Squadron	133d Fighter-Interceptor Group	F-94A/B; F-94C	1954-1959	ND Air National Guard; Received F-94As which were upgraded to F-94B standards along with F-94Bs; upgraded to F-94C 1957. Converted to F-89J Scorpion June 1959
179th Fighter-Interceptor Squadron	133d Fighter-Interceptor Group	F-94A/B; F-94C	1954-1959	MN Air National Guard; Received F-94As which were upgraded to F-94B standards along with F-94Bs; upgraded to F-94C June 1957. Converted to F-89J Scorpion (Note: The last F-94C Starfighters were phased out of ANG service by the 179th Fighter Interceptor Squadron at the Duluth Municipal Airport, Minnesota during the summer of 1959, the last being sent to AMARC in December 1959.)
186th Fighter-Interceptor Squadron	140th Fighter-Bomber Group	F-94C	1955-1956	MT Air National Guard; Converted to F-89C Scorpion
190th Fighter-Interceptor Squadron	140th Fighter-Bomber Group	F-94A/B	1954-1956	ID Air National Guard; Received F-94As which were upgraded to F-94B standards along with F-94Bs. Converted to F-89B Scorpion
