= Montesquieu Airfield =

Algerian World War II military airfield

Montesquieu Airfield
- Part of Twelfth Air Force

Site information
- Type: Military airfield
- Controlled by: United States Army Air Forces

Location
- Coordinates: 36°04′27.64″N 007°49′14.28″E

Site history
- Built: 1942
- In use: 1942-1943

Location of Montesquieu, Algeria

Montesquieu Airfield was a World War II military airfield in Algeria, located in the mountains near M'Daourouch, about 112 km southeast of Constantine. Its precise location is undetermined. It was built by the US Army Corps of Engineers and was used by the United States Army Air Force Twelfth Air Force during the North African Campaign against the German Afrika Korps.

- 320th Bombardment Group, April – 29 June 1943, Martin B-26 Marauder
- 325th Fighter Group, 5 April – 3 June 1943, Curtiss P-40 Warhawk

When the Americans moved east to Tunisia in June 1943, the airfield was dismantled and abandoned. There are several possible locations of the field visible in aerial photography in the mountains just north of M'Daourouch, but its precise location cannot be determined.
