= Souk-el-Khemis Airfield =

WWII military airfield in Tunisia

Souk-el-Khemis Airfield
- Part of Twelfth Air Force

Site information
- Type: Military airfield
- Controlled by: United States Army Air Forces

Location
- Coordinates: 36°34′55.22″N 008°58′16.27″E

Site history
- Built: 1943
- In use: 1943

Location of Souk-el-Khemis Airfield, Tunisia

Souk-el-Khemis Airfield is an abandoned World War II military airfield in Tunisia, located approximately 3 km southeast of Bou Salem, and 110 km west-southwest of Tunis. It was a temporary airfield built by the US Army Corps of Engineers, used by the United States Army Air Force Twelfth Air Force and by the Royal Air Force during the North African Campaign.

The use by US forces included the 325th Fighter Group during 3–19 June 1943, flying P-40 Warhawks from here.

Use by the RAF was primarily in the first 3 weeks of May 1943, during which time No.255 Squadron maintained a detachment here. Tracing such use can be problematic, because the RAF referred to the airfield only by a codename, which was "Paddington".

After the 325th moved east, the airfield was dismantled and abandoned. There is little evidence of the airfield's existence other than the outlines of the perimeter track being used for agricultural roads.

== Royal Air Force ==
The Royal Air Force operated from a number of separate airfields around Souk-el-Khemis:

- Paddington - 32, 81, 152, 154, 232, 242, 255 and 261 Squadrons
- Victoria - 154 and 232 Squadron
- Marylebone - 242 Squadron
- Waterloo - 111 and 225 Squadron
- Euston - 72, 93, 241 and 243 Squadrons
- Kings Cross - 18 and 114 Squadrons

== Bibliography ==
- Maurer, Maurer. Air Force Combat Units of World War II. Maxwell AFB, Alabama: Office of Air Force History, 1983. ISBN 0-89201-092-4.
- Maurer, Maurer, ed. (1982) [1969]. Combat Squadrons of the Air Force, World War II (PDF) (reprint ed.). Washington, DC: Office of Air Force History. ISBN 0-405-12194-6. LCCN 70605402. OCLC 72556. Archived from the original (PDF) on December 20, 2016.
