= Mateur Airfield =

Abandoned World War II military airfield in Tunisia

Mateur Airfield
- Part of Twelfth Air Force

Site information
- Type: Military airfield
- Controlled by: United States Army Air Forces

Location
- Coordinates: 37°04′13.11″N 009°39′31.31″E

Site history
- Built: 1943
- In use: 1943

Location of Mateur Airfield, Tunisia

Mateur Airfield is an abandoned World War II military airfield in Tunisia, located approximately 4 km north-northwest of the town of Mateur, 52 km northwest of Tunis. It was used by the United States Army Air Force Twelfth Air Force during the Tunisian Campaign. It was a temporary airfield, built by the US Army Corps of Engineers, not designed for long-term or heavy-bomber use.

Known units assigned to the field were:

- 1st Fighter Group, 29 June - 31 October 1943, P-38 Lightning
- 325th Fighter Group, 19 June - 4 November 1943, P-40 Warhawk

When the fighter units moved to Sicily and Italy in the beginning of November, the airfield was dismantled and abandoned. Today, some sort of military structure is visible on the old main runway, which is fenced and restricted from public access.
