= 491st =

491st may refer to:

- 491st Bombardment Group, inactive United States Army Air Force unit
- 491st Bombardment Squadron, inactive United States Air Force unit
- 491st Fighter-Bomber Squadron, inactive United States Air Force unit

== See also ==
- 491 (number)
- 491, the year 491 (CDXCI) of the Julian calendar
- 491 BC
