= 498th Fighter-Interceptor Squadron =

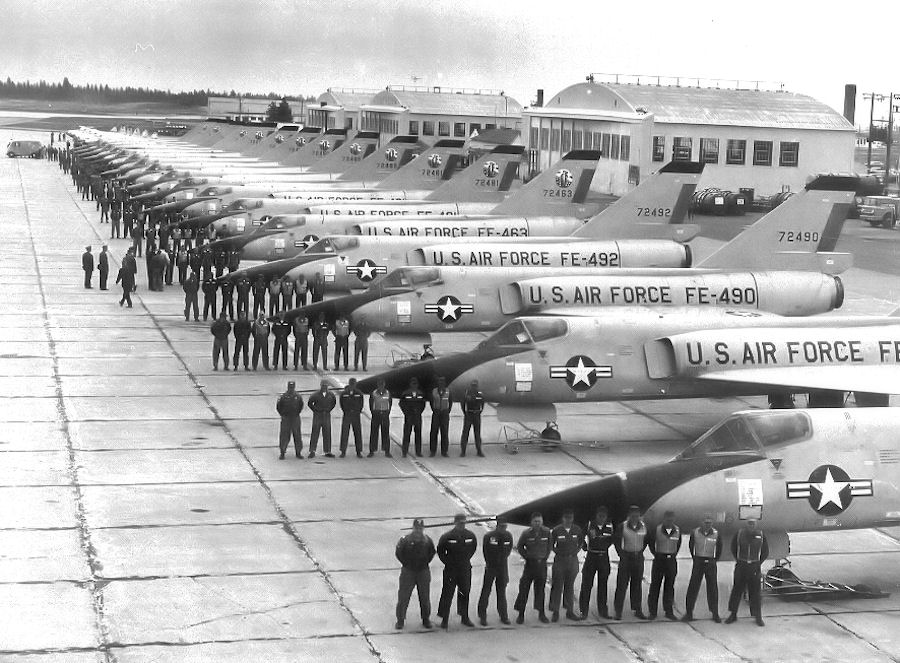
- Aircraft, pilots and support crews of the 498th line up in their final formation before moving to McChord AFB in 1963
- Active: 1942–1944; 1955–1968
- Country: United States
- Branch: United States Air Force
- Role: Fighter interceptor
- Nicknames: Geiger Tigers (1955–1963), Megas Gatas (Note: Bad Greek for "Big Cats". The correct plural transcription would be Megales Gates per Google Translate)

Insignia
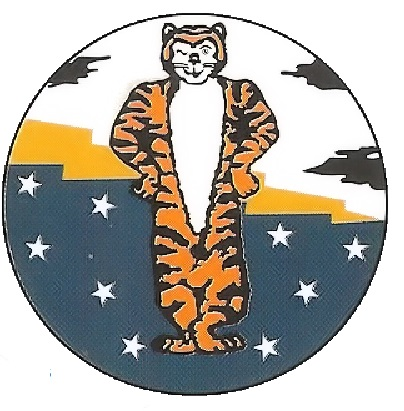
- 498th Fighter-Interceptor Squadron emblem (Note: Approved 7 March 1956. Description: A disc divided diagonally by an Air force yellow lightning bolt, the upper section white, with black cloud formations, the lower section deep blue with nine white stars; over all a caricatured tiger, tawny orange, black facial features and stripes, white face ear and chest markings, the tiger standing upright, fullface with forepaws resting on hips.)

The 498th Fighter-Interceptor Squadron is an inactive United States Air Force unit. Its last assignment was with Air Defense Command stationed at Hamilton Air Force Base, California, where it was inactivated on 30 September 1968.

The squadron was first activated in 1942 as the 303rd Bombardment Squadron and served as a training unit for single engine bomber crews, and later as the 498th Fighter-Bomber Squadron, for fighter pilots until being disbanded in 1944 in a general reorganization of Army Air Forces training units.

It was reconstituted in 1955 as the 498th Fighter-Interceptor Squadron and served as an air defense unit in the western United States.

== History ==
=== World War II ===
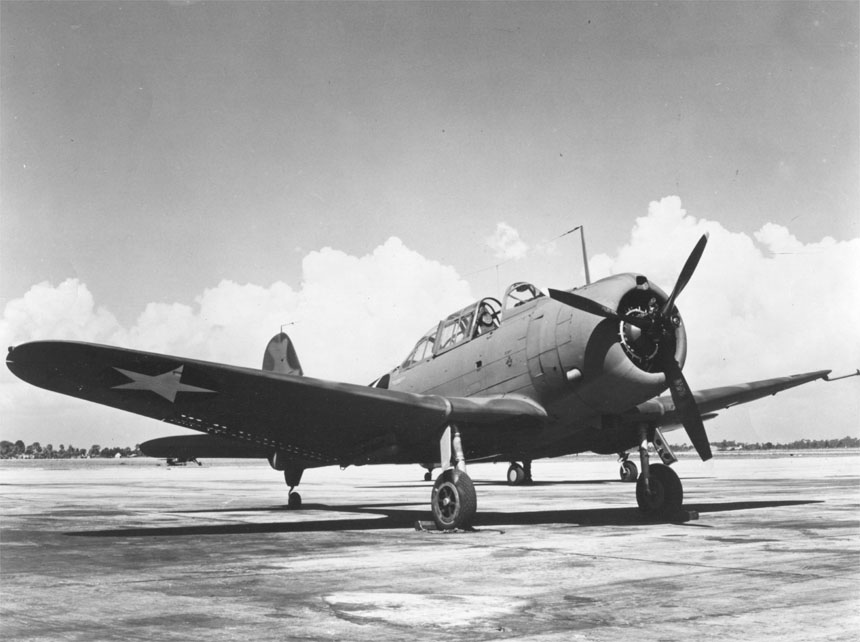
A-24 Banshee as flown by the squadron

The squadron was activated in 1942 as the 303rd Bombardment Squadron (Light) at Savannah Air Base, Georgia, and equipped with Douglas A-24 Banshee dive bombers as one of the original squadrons of the 84th Bombardment Group. It received its initial cadre and equipment from the 3d Bombardment Group. It operated briefly with Vultee V-72 (A-31 Vengeance) aircraft, but its operations showed this aircraft was unsuitable for dive bombing. The squadron served as an Operational Training Unit (OTU), equipping with A-24 Banshees and Bell P-39 Airacobras.

The OTU program involved the use of an oversized parent unit to provide cadres to “satellite groups " The OTU program was patterned after the unit training system of the Royal Air Force. After forming the satellite groups, the parent unit assumed responsibility for satellite training and oversaw its expansion with graduates of Army Air Forces Training Command schools to become effective combat units. Phase I training concentrated on individual training in crewmember specialties. Phase II training emphasized the coordination for the crew to act as a team. The final phase concentrated on operation as a unit. The squadron contributed to the 84th Group's role as the parent for elements of several light bombardment groups. (Note: These units were the 85th, 311th, 312th, 319th, 405th and 407th Bombardment Groups.)

In August 1943, the squadron was redesignated the 498th Fighter-Bomber Squadron as were other Army Air Forces (AAF) single engine bombardment units, and was re-equipped with Republic P-47 Thunderbolts. It continued to serve as an OTU until October 1943. During the fall of 1943, operations dwindled and by the end of September 1943 only five aircraft were assigned to the entire 84th Group.

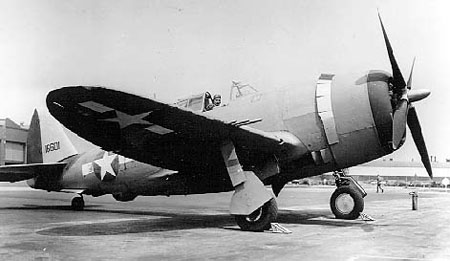
P-47 Thunderbolt

In October 1943, the squadron moved to Harding Field, Louisiana, where it became a Replacement Training Unit (RTU) and also participated occasionally in demonstrations and maneuvers. RTUs were also oversized units, but with the mission of training individual pilots or aircrews. However, the AAF found that standard military units, based on relatively inflexible tables of organization were not proving well adapted to the training mission. Accordingly, it adopted a more functional system in which each base was organized into a separate numbered unit. The squadron was, therefore, disbanded in April 1944 and replaced by the 261st AAF Base Unit (Combat Crew Training School, Fighter), which took over the personnel, equipment and mission of the squadron at Abilene Army Air Field.

=== Cold War Air defense ===
In 1955, Air Defense Command (ADC) implemented Project Arrow, which was designed to bring back on the active list fighter units which had compiled memorable records in the two world wars and restore squadrons to the groups they were associated with during World War II. In this reorganization, the 84th Fighter Group was activated at Geiger Field, Washington to replace the 530th Air Defense Group. As part of this reorganization, the squadron was redesignated the 498th Fighter-Interceptor Squadron and activated on 18 August 1955, when it took over the mission, personnel and equipment of the 520th Fighter-Interceptor Squadron, which was simultaneously inactivated. The squadron was initially equipped with North American F-86D Sabres, which were equipped with airborne intercept radar and armed with FFAR rockets.

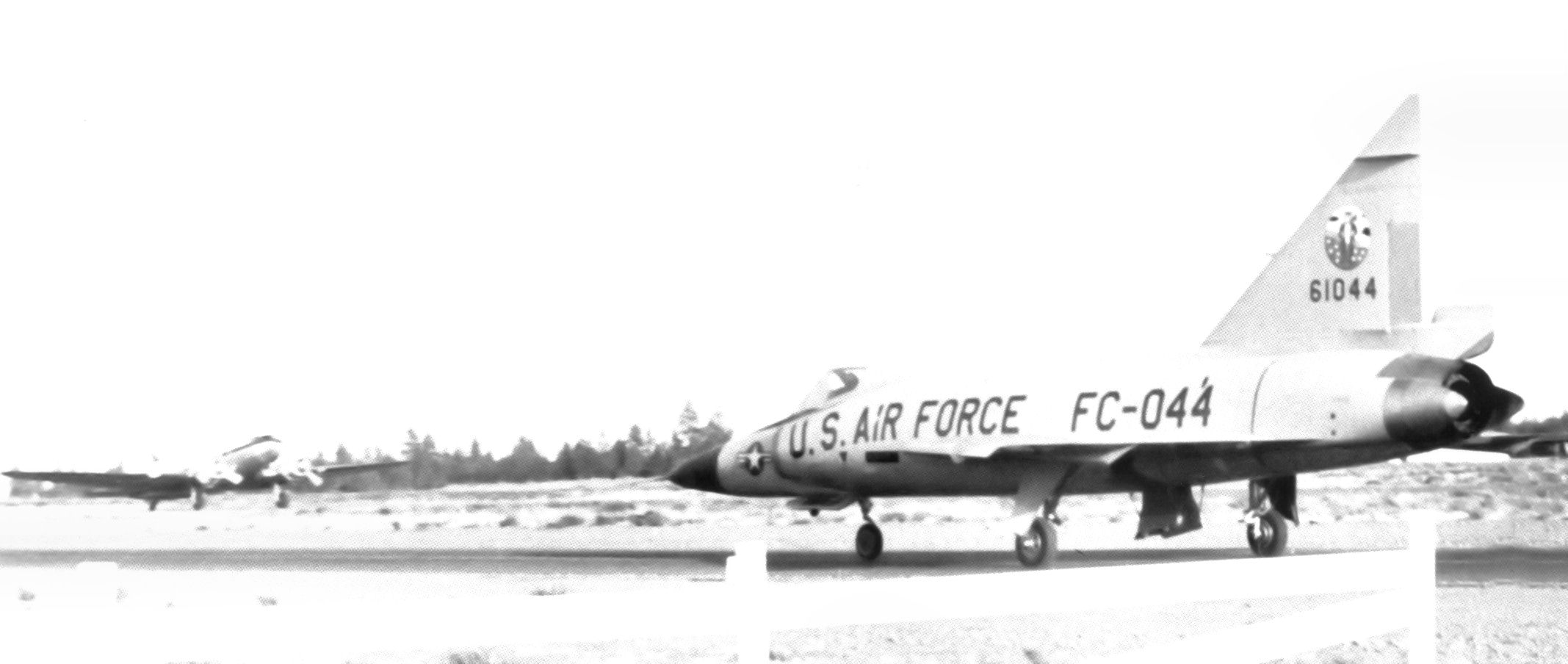
Squadron F-102 Delta Dager (Note: Aircraft is Convair F-102A-55-CO Delta Dagger, serial 56-1044. Thhis plane was sent to the Military Aircraft Storage and Disposition Center on 28 August 1974. It was converted to a QF-102A in 1979 and to PQM-102B in 1980 and crashed at Nellis AFB, NV. Dirkx, Marco (6 May 2025). "1956 USAF Serial Numbers". Joe Baugher’s Serial Number List.)

It upgraded to Convair F-102A Delta Daggers in July 1957 and then to Convair F-106A Delta Darts in February 1959. It was the first operational squadron to receive the Delta Dart. Although the number of ADC interceptor squadrons remained almost constant in the early 1960s, attrition (and the fact that production lines closed in 1961) caused a gradual drop in the number of planes assigned to a squadron, from 24 to typically 18 by 1964. In February 1962, ADC increased the alert requirement for its units. In addition to the two aircraft the squadron had been maintaining on five minute alert, one third of the unit’s aircraft were placed on fifteen minute alert.

On 22 October 1962, before President John F. Kennedy told Americans that missiles were in place in Cuba, ADC went to DEFCON 5 Delta, which put all planes on 5 minute alert, continuing until 27 November. the squadron dispersed one third of its force, equipped with nuclear tipped missiles to Paine Air Force Base. Dispersed aircraft were armed with their primary armament, including nuclear missiles. Personnel and aircraft were rotated to dispersal sites during the crisis. These planes returned to Geiger Field after the crisis.

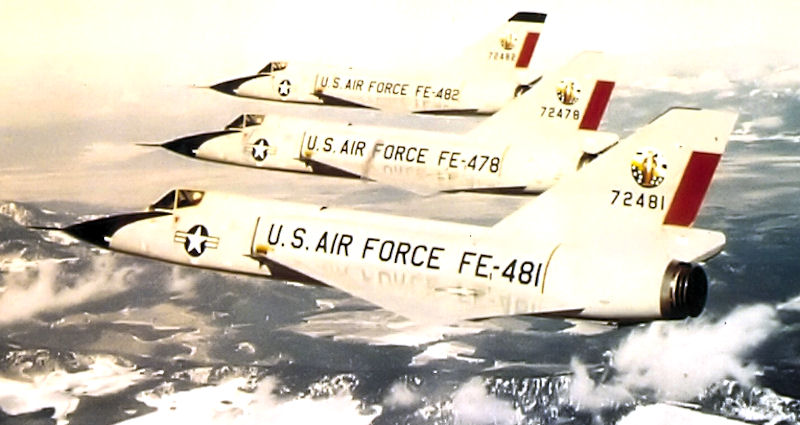
Squadron Convair F-106A Delta Darts at Geiger Field

The squadron moved to McChord Air Force Base in July 1963. On 15 March 1963 two Soviet bombers had overflown Alaska and Alaskan Air Command F-102s were unable to intercept them. The response to this intrusion was to deploy ten F-106s from the squadron and its sister unit, the 318th Fighter-Interceptor Squadron to Alaska in what was called Operation White Shoes. However, maintaining these aircraft for an extended period of time put a strain on the 325th wing's combat readiness back at McChord, and eventually a detachment of maintenance personnel was established to maintain the planes in Alaska. The unit got relief from this commitment while it was upgrading its F-106s from the 1st Fighter Wing, which relieved it from March to June 1964. Operation White Shoes terminated in 1965 and the unit's planes returned home.

In June 1966, the 64th Fighter-Interceptor Squadron deployed to Clark Air Base, Philippines to reinforce air defenses in Southeast Asia. The squadron moved to Paine Field, Washington to replace it in July, and was assigned to the 57th Fighter Group there.

On 30 September 1968, the squadron moved to Hamilton Air Force Base, California. Upon its arrival, it was inactivated and its personnel and equipment were transferred to the 84th Fighter-Interceptor Squadron, which used the 498th's F-106s to replace their McDonnell F-101 Voodoos.

== Lineage ==
- Constituted as the 303d Bombardment Squadron (Light) on 13 January 1942

Activated on 10 February 1942
Redesignated 303d Bombardment Squadron (Dive) on 27 July 1942
Redesignated 498th Fighter-Bomber Squadron on 10 August 1943
Disbanded on 1 April 1944

- Reconstituted and redesignated 498th Fighter-Interceptor Squadron on 20 June 1955

Activated on 18 August 1955
Inactivated on 30 September 1968

=== Assignments ===
- 84th Bombardment Group (later 84th Fighter-Bomber Group), 10 February 1942 – 1 April 1944
- 84th Fighter Group, 18 August 1955
- 325th Fighter Wing, 1 July 1963
- 57th Fighter Group, 25 June 1966
- 78th Fighter Wing, 30 September 1968

=== Stations ===
- Savannah Air Base, Georgia, 10 February 1942
- Drew Field, Florida, 8 February 1943
- Harding Field, Louisiana, 4 October 1943
- Hammond Army Air Field, Louisiana, c. 11 October 1943
- Abilene Army Air Field, Texas, 11 February – April 1944
- Geiger Field, Washington (later Spokane International Aiirport), 18 August 1955
- McChord Air Force Base, Washington, 1 July 1963
- Paine Field, Washington, 14 June 1966
- Hamilton Air Force Base California, 30 September 1968

=== Aircraft ===
- Vultee V-72 Vengeance, 1942
- Douglas A-24 Banshee, 1942–1943
- Bell P-39 Airacobra, 1943
- Republic P-47 Thunderbolt, 1943–1944
- North American F-86D Sabre, 1955–1957
- Convair F-102A Delta Dagger, 1957–1959
- Convair F-106A Delta Dart, 1959–1968

=== Campaigns ===
Campaign Streamer	Campaign	Dates	Notes
	American Theater without inscription	10 February 1942–1 April 1944	303rd Bombardment Squadron (later 498th Fighter-Bomber Squadron)

== See also ==
- Aerospace Defense Command Fighter Squadrons
- List of F-86 Sabre units
- List of F-106 Delta Dart units of the United States Air Force
