= 84th Combat Sustainment Group =

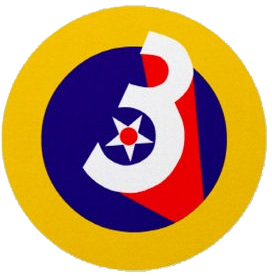
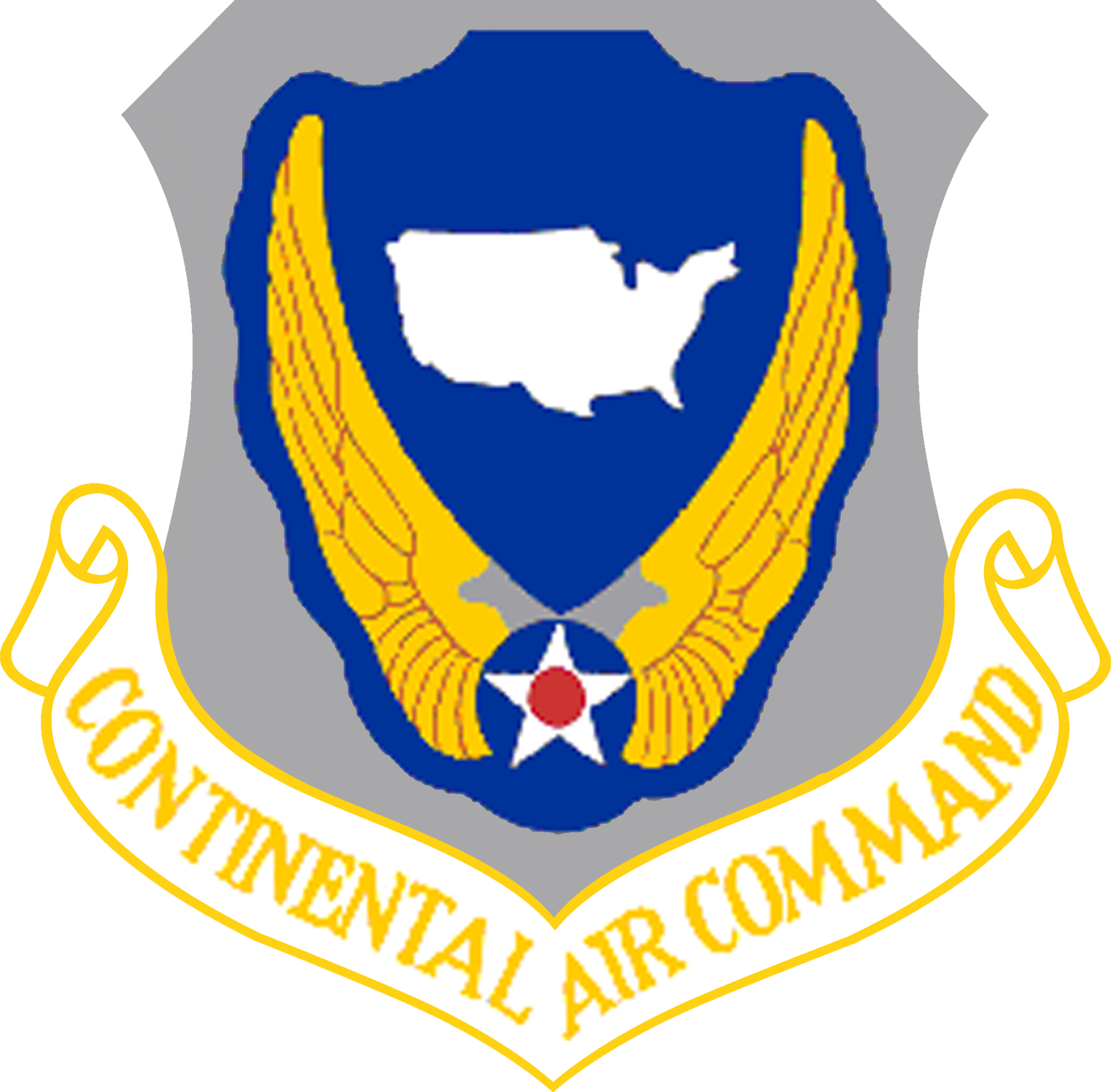
84th Combat Sustainment Group

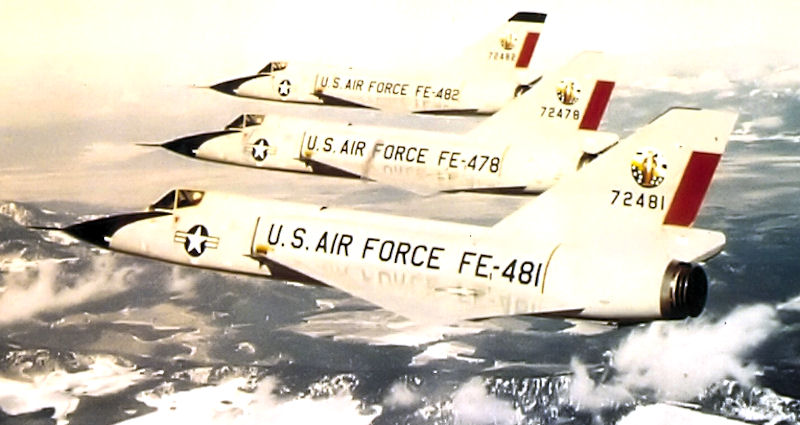
- F-106 Delta Darts of the 498th Fighter-Interceptor Squadron (Note: Aircraft are Convair F-106A-80-CO serials 57-2470 and 57-2481 and F-106A-75-CO serial 57-2462. 57-2481 was converted to a QF-106 and was shot down by an AIM-120 on 25 July 1995. 57-2470 was at the Pima Air Museum by 28 January 1991 then converted to a QF-106 and shot down by AIM-120 on 1 February 1994. 57-2462 crashed on 21 December 1961.)
- Active: 1942–1944, 1949–1951, 1955–1963, 2005–2010
- Country: United States
- Branch: United States Air Force
- Type: Air Defense
- Motto: Cursum Perficio (Latin for 'I Accomplish my Course')

Insignia
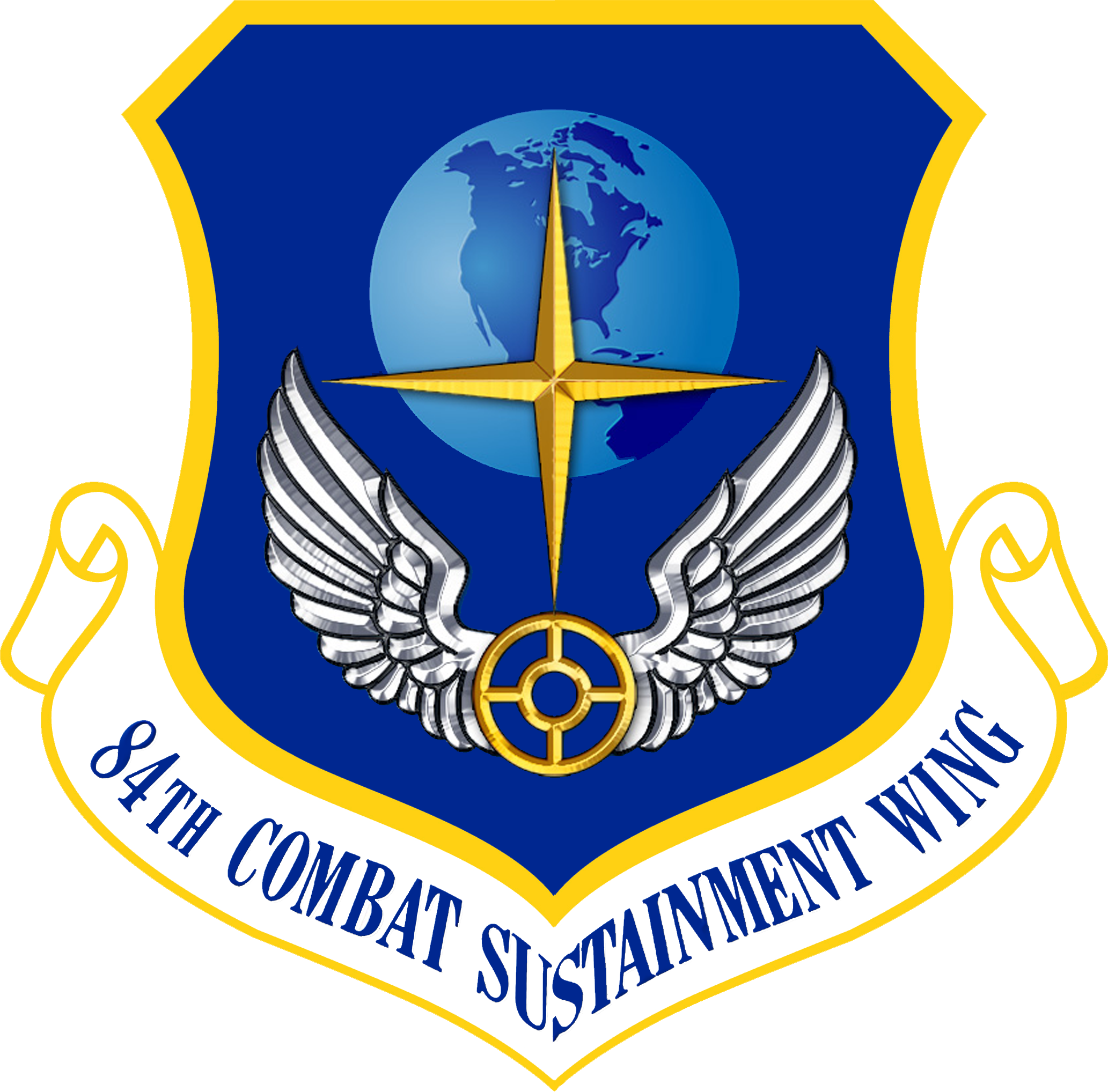
- Emblem of the 84th Combat Sustainment Group (Note: The group uses the wing emblem with group name on scroll. AFI 84-105, paragraph 3.3.3.)

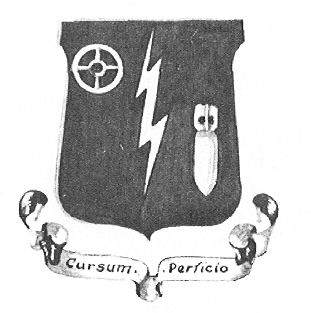
- 84th Fighter Group emblem (Note: Approved 22 January 1943. Description: Azure, a flash in pale between in dexter chief a gunsight and in sinister base a drop bomb, palewise all or.)

The 84th Combat Sustainment Group is an inactive United States Air Force (USAF) group last assigned to the 84th Combat Sustainment Wing at Hill Air Force Base, Utah, where it was inactivated in 2010. The group was formed in 1942 as the 84th Bombardment Group, one of the first dive bomber units in the United States Army Air Corps and tested the Vultee Vengeance, proving that aircraft unsuitable as a dive bomber. As an Operational Training Unit, it was the parent for several other bombardment groups, but from 1943 until it was disbanded in 1944, trained replacement aircrews as a Replacement Training Unit designated the 84th Fighter-Bomber Group.

The group was again active as a fighter group from 1949 to 1951 in the reserves, with no equipment of its own, but using that of the Regular 52d Fighter-All Weather Group until it was called to active duty in 1951 and its personnel used to man other units.

In 1955, as part of an Air Defense Command program to revive fighter units that had served in World War II, the group became the 84th Fighter Group (Air Defense) and served as the USAF host at Geiger Field and served in an air defense role in the northwestern United States until inactivating in 1963.

The group changed missions again, becoming a logistics unit when activated in 2006 as part of a major reorganization of Air Force Materiel Command (AFMC). It was inactivated in 2010, when this reorganization was reversed, and AFMC returned to a more traditional organization.

== History ==
=== World War II ===
==== Bombardment Group ====
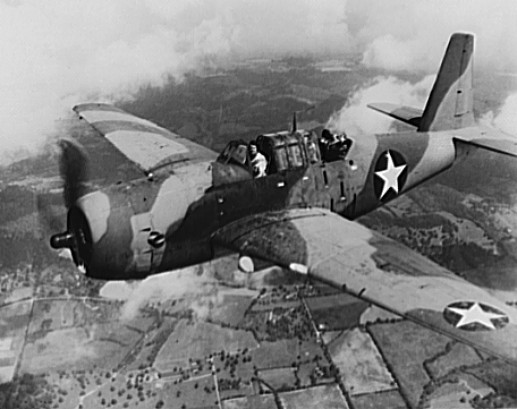
Vultee Vengeance in flight Dec 1942

The group was activated in 1942 as the 84th Bombardment Group (Light) at Hunter Field, Georgia, and equipped with Douglas A-24 Banshee dive bombers. The 301st, 302d, 303d, and 304th Bombardment Squadrons were assigned. It received its initial cadre and equipment from the 3d Bombardment Group. The group was assigned the first Army Air Forces (AAF) squadron expressly designated for dive bombing. It operated briefly with Vultee V-72 (A-31 Vengeance) aircraft, but its operations showed this aircraft was unsuitable for dive bombing. The group served as an Operational Training Unit (OTU), equipping with A-24 Banshees and Bell P-39 Airacobras.

The OTU program involved the use of an oversized parent unit to provide cadres to “satellite groups " The OTU program was patterned after the unit training system of the Royal Air Force. After forming the satellite groups, the parent unit assumed responsibility for satellite training and oversaw its expansion with graduates of Army Air Forces Training Command schools to become effective combat units. Phase I training concentrated on individual training in crewmember specialties. Phase II training emphasized the coordination for the crew to act as a team. The final phase concentrated on operation as a unit. The 84th Group was the parent for several light bombardment groups (Note: These units were the 85th, 311th, 312th, 319th, 405th and 407th Bombardment Groups.) and also trained pilots from Chile.

==== Fighter-Bomber Group ====
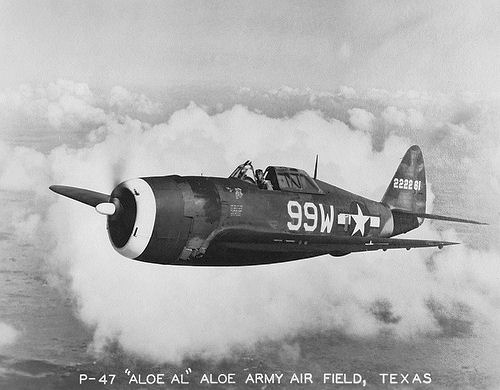
P-47 from a US based RTU

In August 1943, the squadron was redesignated the 84th Fighter-Bomber Group as were other Army Air Forces (AAF) single engine bombardment units, and was re-equipped with Republic P-47 Thunderbolts. It continued to serve as an OTU until October 1943. During the fall of 1943, operations dwindled and by the end of September 1943 only five aircraft were assigned to the group. As a result of this redesignation, its squadrons were renumbered as the 496th, 497th, 498th, and 491st Fighter-Bomber Squadrons, respectively. During World War II, the 84th Group served as an Operational Training Unit (OTU) until October 1943. The OTU program involved the use of an oversized parent unit to provide cadres to "satellite groups." During the fall of 1943, group operations dwindled and by the end of September 1943 only five aircraft were assigned to the group.

The group then became a Replacement Training Unit (RTU) and also participated occasionally in demonstrations and maneuvers. RTUs were also oversized units, but with the mission of training individual pilots or aircrews. In performing this mission, the group assumed a split operation, with group headquarters and the 491st and 497th Squadrons moving to Harding Field, Louisiana, while the 496th and 498th Squadrons moved to Hammond Army Air Field, Louisiana in October and November 1943 and Abilene Army Air Field, Texas in February 1944.

However, the AAF found that standard military units, based on relatively inflexible tables of organization were proving less well adapted to the training mission in the US. Accordingly, a more functional system was adopted in which each base was organized into a separate numbered unit. The group was, therefore, disbanded in April 1944 and replaced at Harding by the 236th AAF Base Unit (Combat Crew Training School, Fighter) as the Army Air Forces disbanded its units in the US that were not programmed to be transferred overseas. At the same time, the 261st AAF Base Unit (Combat Crew Training School, Fighter) took over the personnel, equipment and mission of the squadrons at Abilene.

=== Cold War ===
==== Continental Air Command ====
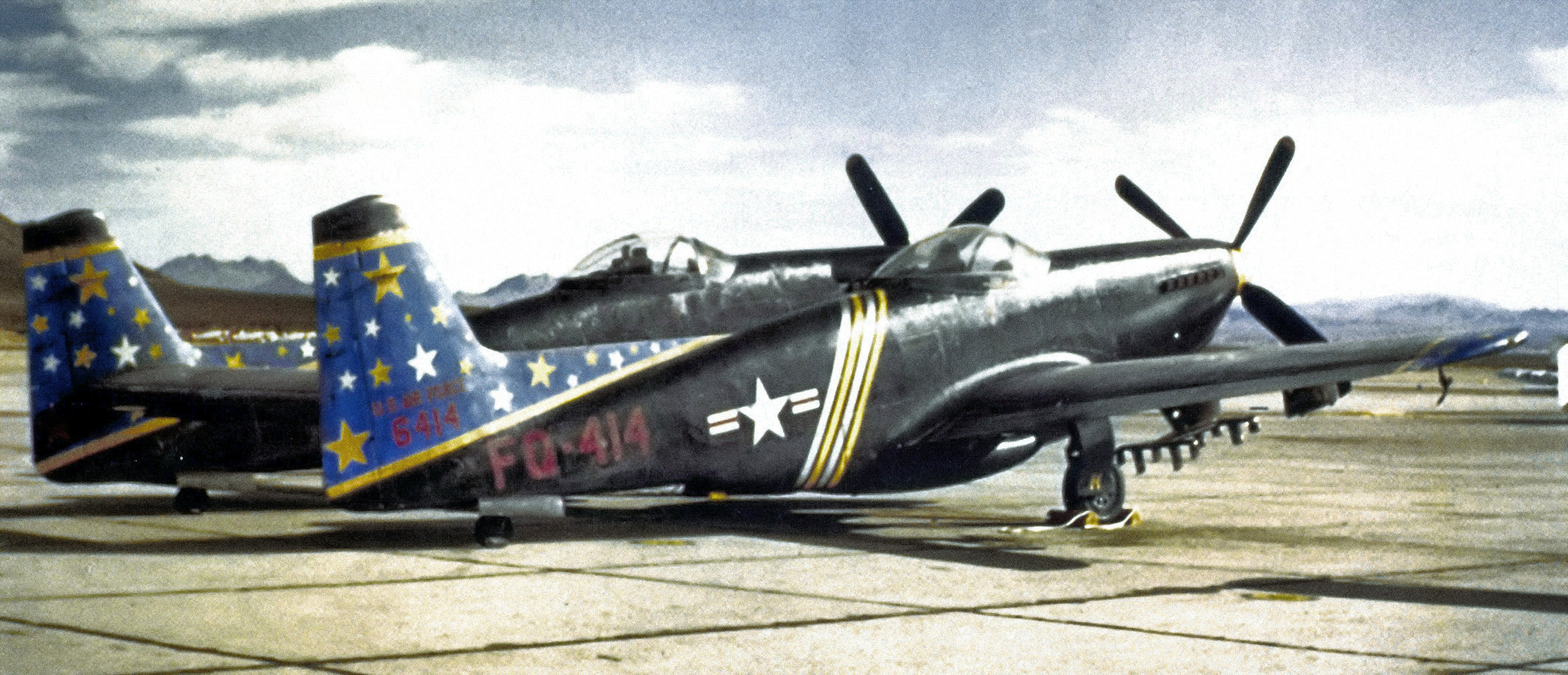
F-82 of the 52d Fighter Group (Note: Aircraft is North American F-82F Twin Mustang serial 46-414 assigned to the 2d Fighter All Weather Squadron.)

The May 1949 Air Force Reserve program called for a new type of unit, the corollary unit, which was a reserve unit integrated with an active duty unit. The plan called for corollary units at 107 locations. It was viewed as the best method to train reservists by mixing them with an existing regular unit to perform duties alongside the regular unit. As part of this program, the group was reconstituted as the 84th Fighter Group, All Weather and activated at Mitchel Air Force Base, New York in the Air Force Reserves to train as a fighter corollary unit of the 52d Fighter Group of the regular Air Force, moving with the 52d to McGuire Air Force Base, New Jersey a few months later. The group was apparently undermanned and thus performed very little training. During its only 2-week summer encampment (12–26 June 1950), the group had only four pilots capable of flying the 52d's North American F-82 Twin Mustangs provided for training the 84th. Like other corollary units, the 84th Group seems to have been poorly manned, and the parent 52d Fighter-All Weather Wing made little use of its corollary units, focusing on its combat mission instead. The 84th Group was ordered to active service on 1 June 1951, inactivated the next day, and its few people became "fillers" for the 52d Wing or, if there was no vacancy in the 52d, for other USAF units.

==== Air Defense Command ====
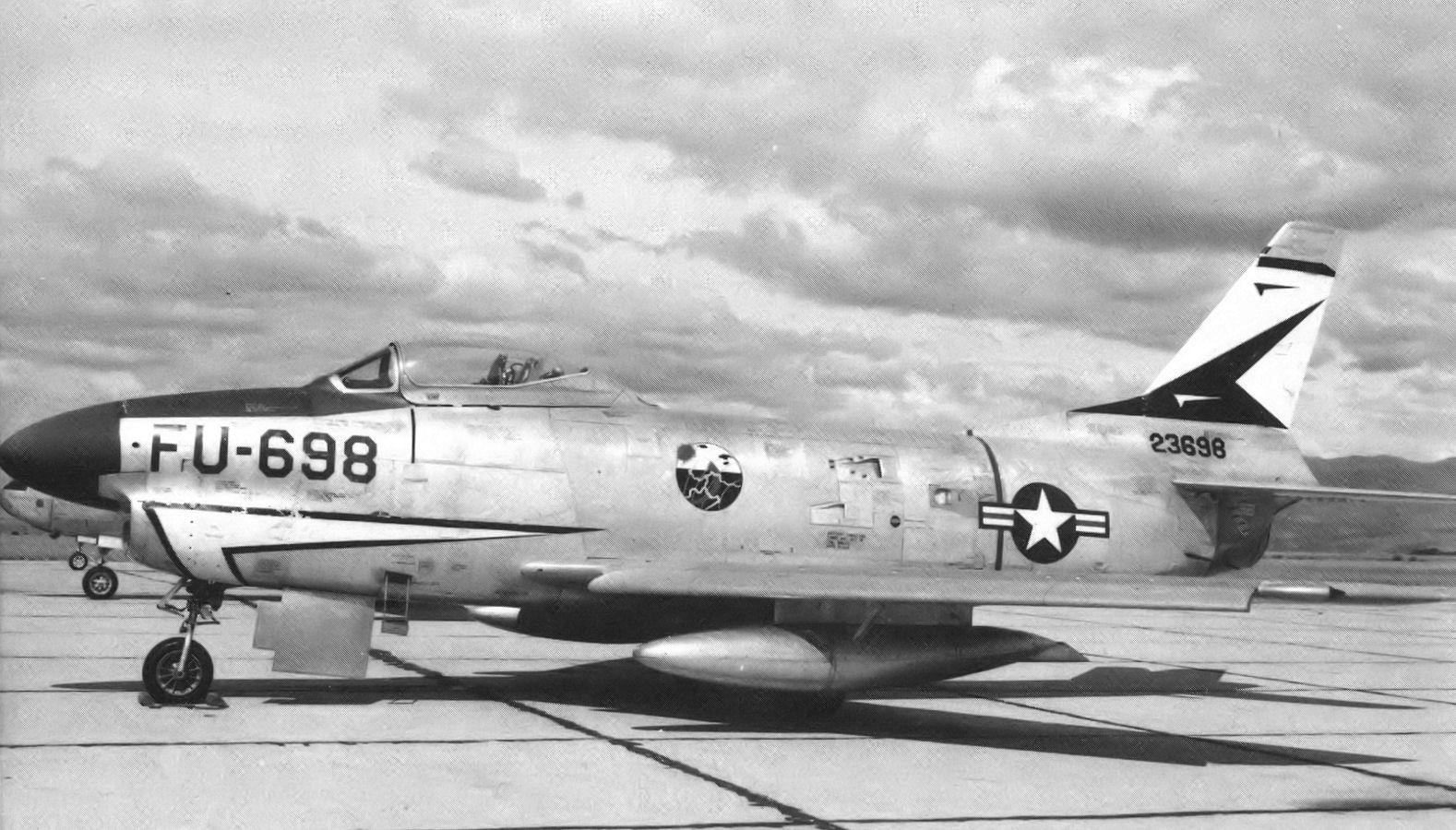
F-86D Sabre of the group's 497th FIS

The group was redesignated the 84th Fighter Group (Air Defense) and reactivated in 1955 at Geiger Field, WA to replace the 530th Air Defense Group as part of Air Defense Command's Project Arrow, which was designed to bring back on the active list the fighter units which had compiled memorable records in the two world wars. It was assigned the 497th Fighter-Interceptor Squadron (FIS), which moved to Geiger from Portland International Airport and the newly activated 498th FIS. These two squadrons took over the equipment and personnel of the inactivating 440th FIS and 520th FIS. Both squadrons flew radar equipped and Mighty Mouse rocket armed North American F-86 Sabres.

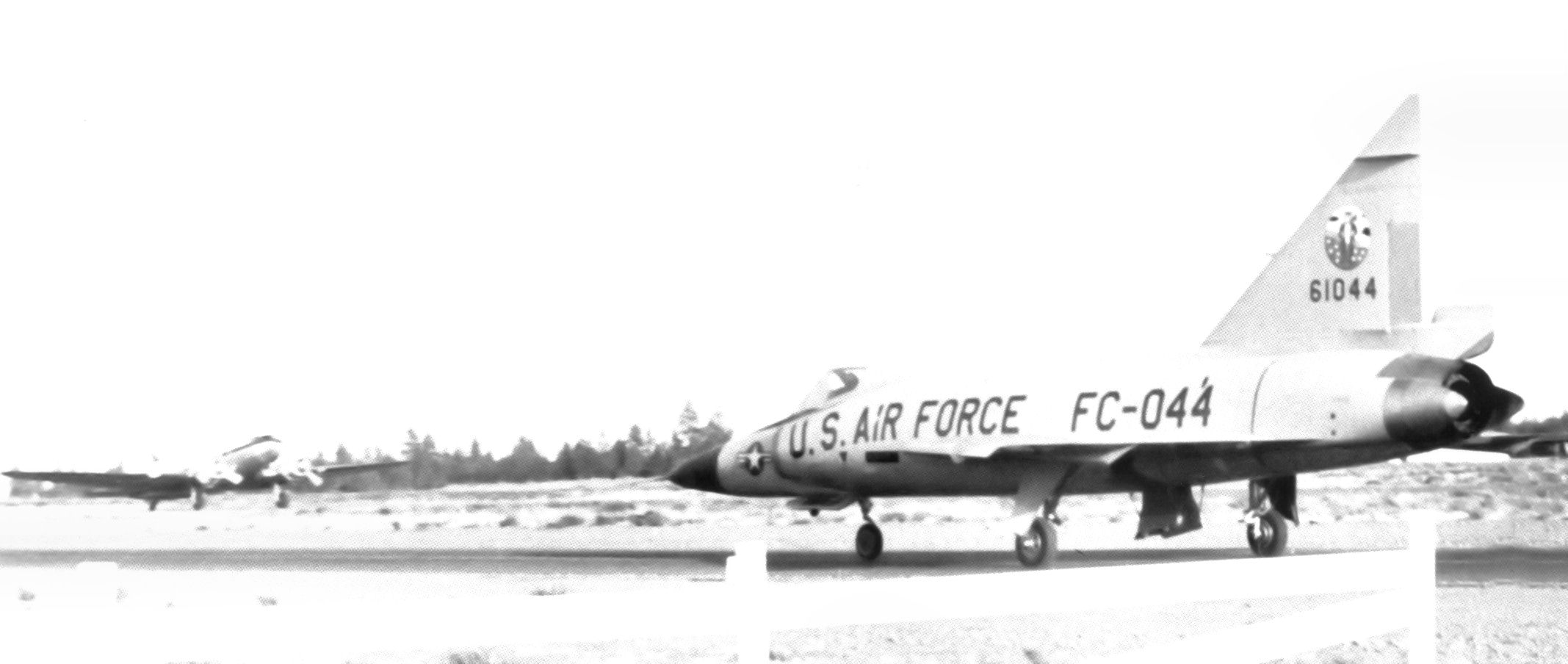
F-102A Delta Dagger of the 498th Fighter-Interceptor Squadron (Note: Aircraft is Convair F-102A-55-CO Delta Dagger serial 56-1044 at Geiger Field, Washington in 1956.)

The group provided air defense and acted as USAF host organization at Geiger. It was assigned several support organizations to perform its host duties, including communications, base operations, law enforcement, housing and food services. In February 1957, the 498th FIS upgraded to Convair F-102 Delta Daggers, which were equipped with data link for interception control through the Semi-Automatic Ground Environment system. The 497th FIS, however, continued to fly Sabres until it moved to Europe in June 1958 and was reassigned away from the group. In July 1959, the group again upgraded to Convair F-106 Delta Darts.

On 22 October 1962, before President John F. Kennedy told Americans that missiles were in place in Cuba, the group dispersed a portion of its force, equipped with nuclear tipped missiles to Paine Air Force Base at the start of the Cuban Missile Crisis. These planes returned after the crisis. The group was inactivated shortly thereafter, in July 1963 and its combat squadron transferred to McChord Air Force Base, Washington and the 325th Fighter Wing (Air Defense).

=== Twenty-first century ===
The group was reactivated in 2005 as a logistics support group at Hill Air Force Base, Utah as part of Air Force Materiel Command reorganization, which replaced that command's traditional staff agency organizations with wings and groups. It added component squadrons the following year. The 84th Combat Sustainment Group developed, acquired, and sustained nineteen major command, control, communication, and intelligence systems, space ground segments and presidential telecommunications systems. It served the National Command Authority, the Services, combatant commands, federal agencies, and foreign sales customers. It managed systems valued at over $3.5B and provided spare parts for fielded systems worldwide. In 2010 the group was inactivated when AFMC returned to its traditional organization.

== Lineage ==
- Constituted as the 84th Bombardment Group (Light) on 13 January 1942

Activated on 10 February 1942
Redesignated 84th Bombardment Group (Dive) 27 July 1942 (Note: This is the date its component squadrons were redesignated as Dive Bomber Squadrons. Maurer, Combat Squadrons, pp. 591–600.)
Redesignated 84th Fighter-Bomber Group 10 August 1943 (Note: This is the date its component squadrons were redesignated as Fighter-Bomber Squadrons. Maurer, Combat Squadrons, pp. 591–600.)
Disbanded on 1 April 1944

- Reconstituted and redesignated 84th Fighter Group, All Weather on 26 May 1949

Activated in the Reserve on 1 June 1949
Redesignated 84th Fighter All-Weather Group on 1 March 1950
Ordered into active service on 1 June 1951
Inactivated on 2 June 1951.

- Redesignated 84th Fighter Group (Air Defense) on 20 June 1955

Activated on 18 August 1955
Inactivated on 15 July 1963

- Redesignated 84th Tactical Fighter Group on 31 July 1985 (remained inactive)
- Redesignated 84th Space and Command, Control, Communications and Intelligence Sustainment Group 15 January 2005

Activated 24 February 2005
Redesignated 84th Combat Sustainment Group 28 April 2006
Inactivated 30 June 2010

=== Assignments ===
- III Ground Air Support Command (later III Air Support Command), 10 February 1942
- 72d Bombardment Operational Training Wing (later 72d Fighter Wing), 20 August 1943 – 1 April 1944
- 84th Fighter Wing, All Weather (later 84th Fighter All-Weather Wing), 1 June 1949 – 1 June 1951
- 9th Air Division, 18 August 1955
- 25th Air Division, 15 August 1958
- 4700th Air Defense Wing, 1 September 1958
- Spokane Air Defense Sector, 15 May 1960 – 15 July 1963
- 84th Combat Sustainment Wing, 24 February 2005 – 30 June 2010

=== Components ===
Operational Squadrons

- 301st Bombardment Squadron (later 496th Fighter-Bomber Squadron, 496th Fighter Squadron, All Weather, 496th Fighter All-Weather Squadron): 10 February 1942 – 1 April 1944; 1 June 1949 – 2 June 1951
- 302d Bombardment Squadron (later 497th Fighter-Bomber Squadron, 497th Fighter-Interceptor Squadron): 10 February 1942 – 1 April 1944; 18 August 1955 – 5 July 1958
- 303d Bombardment Squadron (later 498th Fighter-Bomber Squadron, 498th Fighter-Interceptor Squadron): 10 February 1942 – 1 April 1944; 18 August 1955 – 15 July 1963
- 304th Bombardment Squadron (later 491st Fighter-Bomber Squadron): 10 February 1942 – 1 April 1944

Support Units

- 84th USAF Infirmary (later 84th USAF Dispensary), 18 August 1955 – 15 July 1963
- 84th Air Base Squadron, 18 August 1955 – 15 July 1963
- 84th Consolidated Aircraft Maintenance Squadron, 8 November 1958 – 15 July 1963
- 84th Materiel Squadron, 18 August 1955 – 15 July 1963
- 500th Combat Sustainment Squadron, 28 April 2006 – 30 June 2010
- 501st Combat Sustainment Squadron, 28 April 2006 – 30 June 2010
- 500d Combat Sustainment Squadron, 28 April 2006 – 28 April 2008

=== Stations ===
- Hunter Field, Georgia, 10 February 1942
- Drew Field, Florida, c. 7 February 1943
- Harding Field, Louisiana, 4 October 1943 – 1 April 1944
- Mitchel Air Force Base, New York, 1 June 1949
- McGuire Air Force Base, New Jersey, 10 October 1949 – 2 June 1951
- Geiger Field (later Spokane International Airport), Washington, 18 August 1955 – 15 July 1963
- Hill Air Force Base, Utah, 24 February 2005 – 30 June 2010

=== Aircraft ===
- Vultee V-72 Vengeance, 1942
- Douglas A-24 Dauntless, 1942–1943
- Bell P-39 Airacobra, 1943
- Republic P-47 Thunderbolt, 1943–1944
- North American F-82 Twin Mustang, 1949–1951
- North American F-86D Sabre, 1955–1958
- Convair F-102A Delta Dagger, 1957–1959
- Convair TF-102B Delta Dagger, 1957–1959
- F-106A Delta Dart 1959–1963

=== Campaigns ===
Campaign Streamer	Campaign	Dates	Notes
	American Theater without inscription	10 February 1942 – 1 April 1944	84th Bombardment Group (later 84th Fighter-Bomber Group)

== See also ==
- List of United States Air Force Groups
- Aerospace Defense Command Fighter Squadrons
- List of F-86 Sabre units
- List of F-106 Delta Dart units of the United States Air Force
