= McChord Field Historic District =

Historic district in Washington, United States

- U.S. National Register of Historic Places
- U.S. Historic district
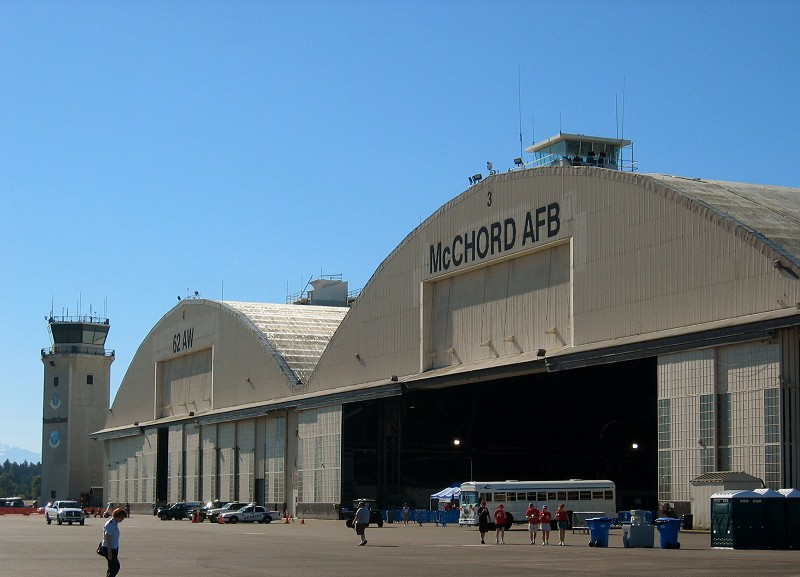
- A hangar at the base that contributes to the historic character of the district

- Location within Washington (state)
- Location: Tacoma, Washington
- Coordinates: 47°08′02″N 122°29′08″W
- Area: 18 acres (73,000 m^{2})
- Built: 1938-1942
- NRHP reference No.: 08001026
- Added to NRHP: December 12, 2008

McChord Field Historic District is a historic district located within the McChord Air Force Base in Pierce County, Washington. The base is located at the base of Puget Sound. The 31 contributing buildings and 3 contributing structures included in the district all date to the establishment of McChord Field and its role in World War II. Additionally, the district is significant for its architecture representative of the period from 1938 through 1952. It was listed on the National Register of Historic Places on December 12, 2008.

It is the 24th property listed as a featured property of the week in a program of the National Park Service that began in July 2008.

== See also ==
- National Register of Historic Places listings in Washington state
