= 445th Test Squadron =

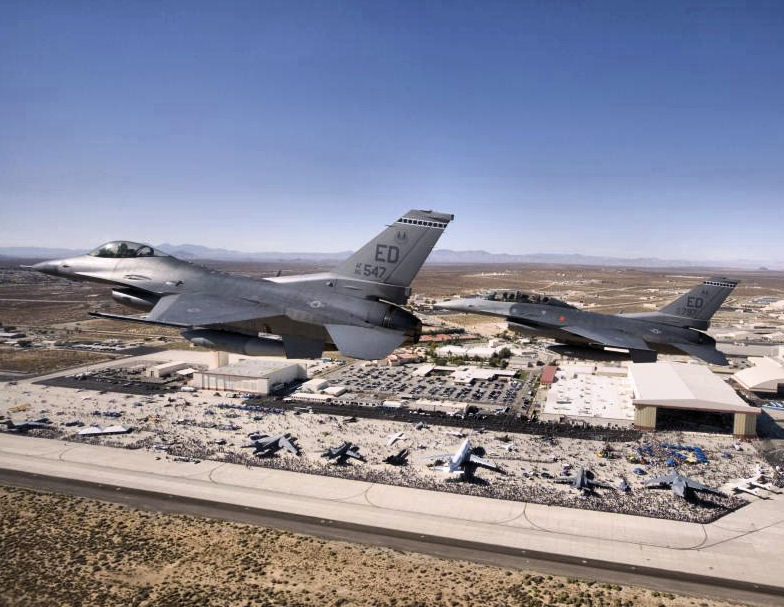
- Squadron F-16 Fighting Falcons at Edwards AFB (Note: Aircraft are General Dynamics F-16C Fighting Falcon, serial 85-1547 and General Dynamics F-16D Fighting Falcon, serial 90-797, taken 17 October 2009.)
- Active: 1943–1946; 1953–1968; 1969–2001; 2004–2015; 2022–present
- Country: United States
- Branch: United States Air Force
- Type: Squadron
- Role: Flight Testing
- Garrison/HQ: Edwards AFB, CA
- Decorations: Air Force Outstanding Unit Award

Insignia
- 445th Flight Test Squadron emblem (approved 11 June 1976)

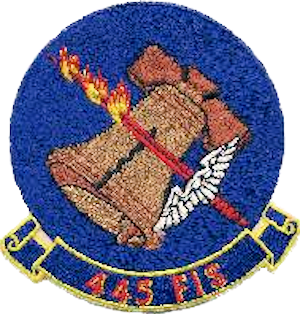
- 445th Fighter-Interceptor Squadron emblem (approved 24 November 1958)

The 445th Test Squadron is a United States Air Force squadron. It is assigned to the 412th Operations Group at Edwards Air Force Base, California. The 445th is part of the Air Force Test Center. Originally constituted in 1943 as the 445th Fighter Squadron, it was involved in the early testing of the first U.S. jets, the Bell P-59 Airacomet and later the Lockheed P-80 Shooting Star. The squadron would also be involved in flight-testing captured enemy aircraft, such as the Mitsubishi A6M Zero. During the Cold War, the unit served under the Air Defense Command as the 445th Fighter-Interceptor Squadron, flying various interceptor aircraft in defense of the Continental United States. Inactivated in 1968 following a draw-down of active duty interceptor units, it was reactivated as the 6512th Test Squadron Squadron in 1969, beginning its official flight-testing mission. The unit was inactivated, reactivated, and redesignated multiple times over its life, being most recently reactivated with its current name in 2022.

== History ==
=== World War II ===
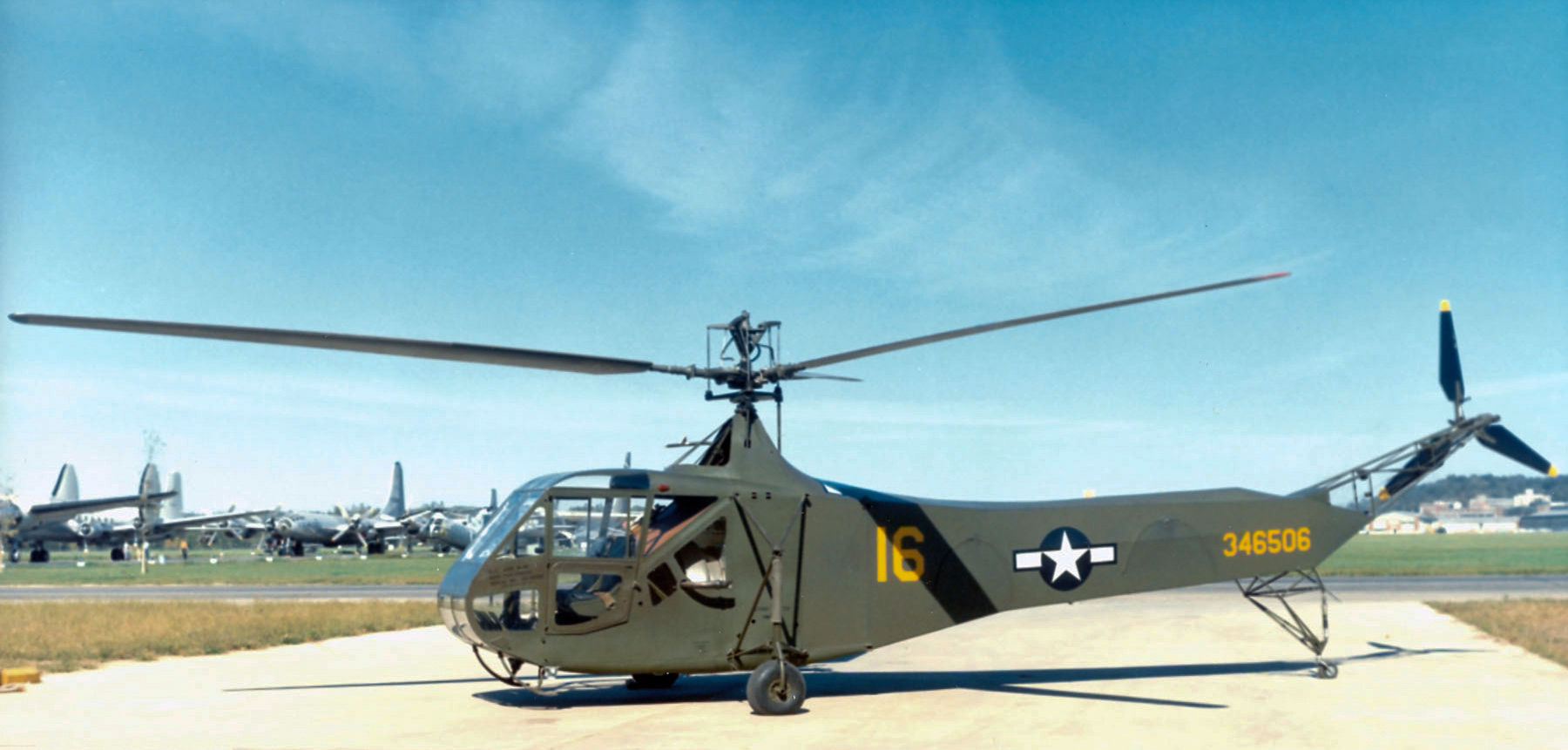
Sikorsky R-4B at National Museum of the United States Air Force

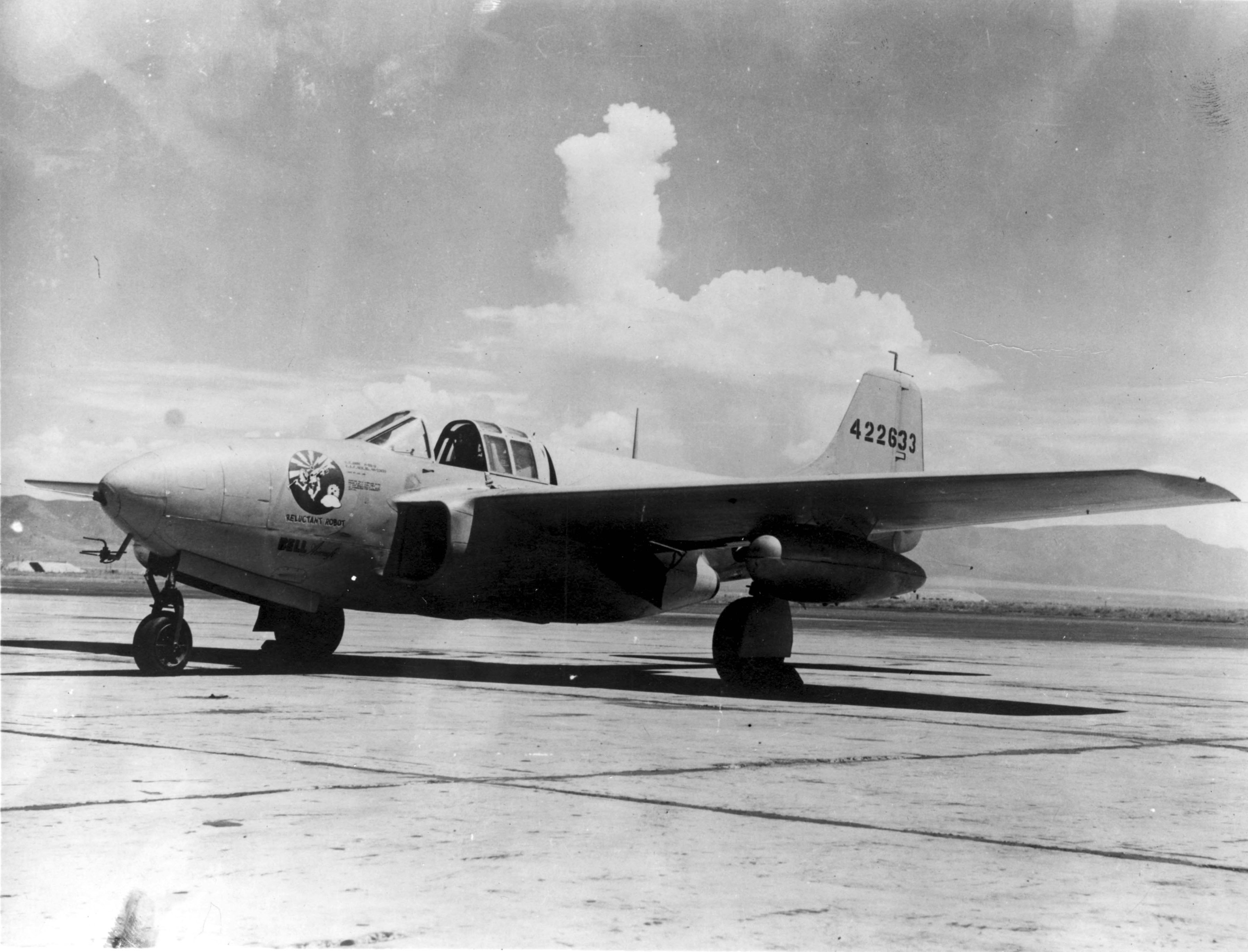
Bell P-59B Airacomet Reluctant Robot

The squadron's first predecessor was activated at Orlando Army Air Base, Florida as the 445th Fighter Squadron in early 1943 as part of the Army Air Force School of Applied Tactics (AAFSAT). AAFSAT's function was to train cadres from newly formed units in combat operations under simulated field conditions as the cores around which new combat groups would be formed.

The 445th trained pilots and furnished cadres to night fighter units. Later, it engaged in mock combat missions over the AAFSAT range training pilots in combat maneuvers, flying a wide variety of fighters and bombers. It remained at the AAFSAT until March 1944 when the training mission of the groups was replaced by the 903d Army Air Forces Base Unit on 1 April 1944 with Section C taking over the fighter training, and Section D, the bombardment training.

It moved to Muroc Army Air Base, California, where it became part of the 412th Fighter Group of Fourth Air Force. It was the first United States jet fighter squadron to be activated, and spent most of its early existence in experimental testing of the Bell P-59 Airacomet and Lockheed P-80 Shooting Star aircraft. The squadron developed training programs and trained aircrew and ground personnel as cadres for newly formed jet aircraft-equipped units. Also flight tested the captured Mitsubishi A6M Zero (Zeke-52); the Kellett XR-3 Autogyro, and Sikorsky R-4 Helicopter.

It was inactivated on 3 July 1946. its mission being assumed by the 2759th Experimental Wing.

=== Air Defense Command ===
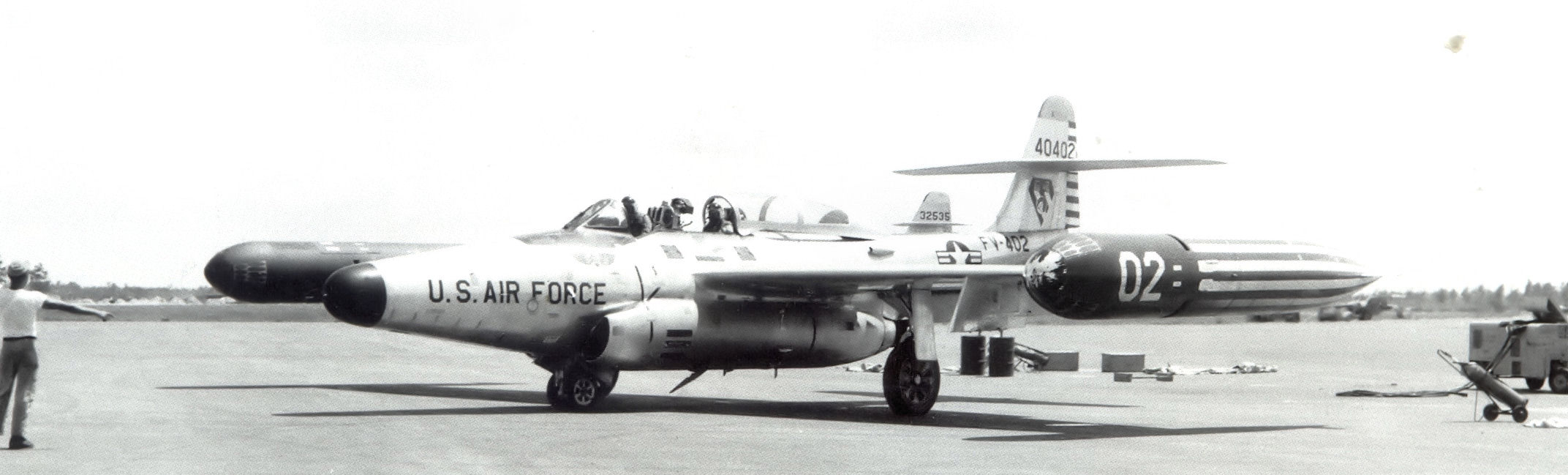
445th FIS F-89 Scorpion (Note: Aircraft is Northrop F-89H Scorpion, serial 54-402 at Wurtsmith AFB, MI.)

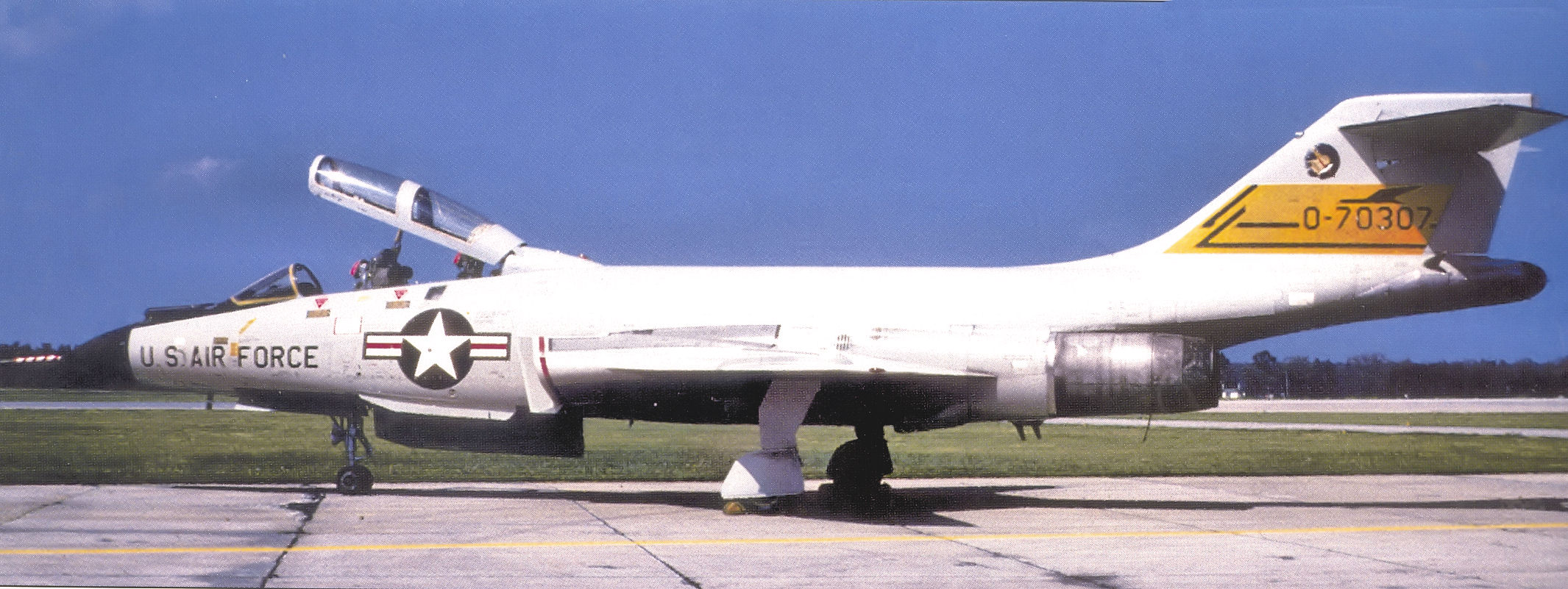
445th FIS F-101 Voodoo (Note: Aircraft is McDonnell F-101F Voodoo, serial 57-307 Wurtsmith AFB, Michigan, September 1968.)

The squadron was reactivated under Air Defense Command (ADC) as the 445th Fighter-Interceptor Squadron in March 1953 at Geiger Field, Washington. In July, the first North American F-86D Sabre interceptors were assigned. The pilots and airmen were relatively inexperienced and the maintenance crew small. The high point in July 1954 was "Operation Checkpoint," a joint SAC-ADC exercise that extended for three days. With sunny days and early takeoffs, the pilots' proficiency increased rapidly and aircraft maintenance became the best in ADC.

In August 1955, ADC's Project Arrow replaced the 445th at Geiger with the 497th Fighter-Interceptor Squadron that moved on paper from Portland Airport, Oregon. The 445th transferred on paper to Wurtsmith Air Force Base, Michigan, performing air defense duties over the Great Lakes area and upper Midwest equipped with Northrop F-89D Scorpions. The 445th FIS was upgraded to the new F-89G Scorpion in March 1956 (the first F-89G squadron in ADC), and upgraded to the F-89J in September 1957.

It was re-equipped with new McDonnell F-101B Voodoo supersonic interceptor aircraft, and the F-101F operational and conversion trainer in 1960. The two-seat trainer version was equipped with dual controls, but carried the same armament as the F-101B and were fully combat-capable. On 22 October 1962, before President John F. Kennedy told Americans that missiles were in place in Cuba, the squadron dispersed one third of its force, equipped with nuclear tipped missiles to Phelps Collins Air National Guard Base at the start of the Cuban Missile Crisis. These planes returned to Wurtsmith after the crisis.

The squadron operated the Voodoos until September 1968, when the aircraft were passed along to the Air National Guard and the squadron was inactivated as part of the general drawdown of the ADC active-duty interceptor force.

=== Flight testing ===
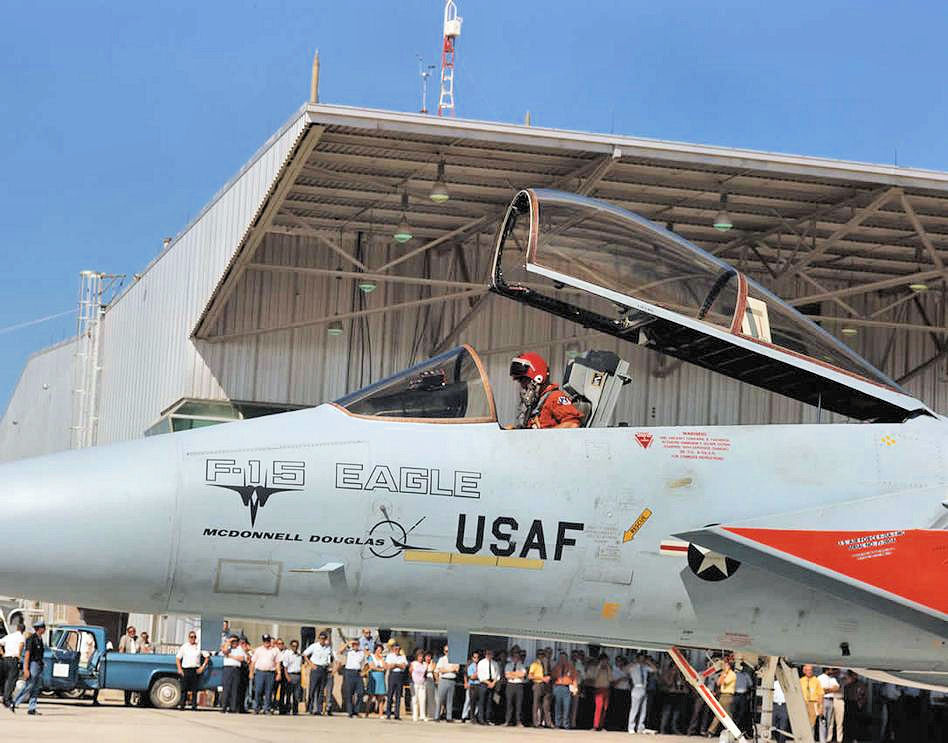
6512th Test Squadron F-15 Eagle (Note: Aircraft is McDonnell F-15A Eagle, serial 71-280, the first F-15 manufactured, preparing to make its first flight on 27 July 1972.)

The 6512th Test Squadron was activated at Edwards Air Force Base, California in 1969 by Air Force Systems Command. it managed all aircraft types not assigned to the various centers/Flight Test Squadrons. From 1989, it primarily operated test support, TPS support, and test program aircraft were not associated with CTFs.

Aircraft types flown by the 6512th/445th included: A/YA-7D, YA-7F, A-7K, NA/OA-37B, NF-4C/D/E, YF-4E, NRF-4C, F-15A/B/C/D/E, F-111A, F-111D, FB-111A (later, F-111G), UH-1N, O-2A, T-37B, T-38A, AT-38B, T-38C, and UV-18. It redesignated as the 445th Flight Test Squadron in October 1992 as part of transfer from Systems Command to Air Force Materiel Command.

It retired the F-111s in 1990, and the A-7s and F-4s in 1992. The last A-37s were retired after a mishap in 1994. It transferred the UH-1Ns to other bases c. 1994–95. It absorbed F-15s from the inactivated 415th Flight Test Squadron on 1 October 1994. From that date, it primarily flew F-15A/B/C/D/E, TA-38A/C, and AT-38B. It was inactivated in late 2001 but activated again in early 2004 in a series of reorganizations at Edwards.

Since 2014, efforts had been underway to consolidate the 445th Flight Test Squadron into three other combined test forces, and on 1 May 2015, base leadership and 445th FLTS personnel were on hand to finally bid farewell to the historic squadron known as "Test Operations" during an inactivation ceremony at Club Muroc. As of May 2015, the 445th FTS was merged into the 416th Flight Test Squadron also based at Edwards. When active, the 445th was the oldest Flight Test Squadron at the airbase. The squadron last flew the F-16C/D Fighting Falcons and T-38C Talons.

The squadron was redesignated the 445th Test Squadron once again and activated at Edwards on 29 June 2022.

== Lineage ==
445th Fighter Squadron

- Constituted as the 445th Fighter Squadron (Special) on 19 February 1943

Activated on 24 February 1943
Redesignated 445th Fighter Squadron (Twin Engine) (Special) on 15 March 1943
Redesignated 445th Fighter Squadron, Single Engine on 11 March 1944
Redesignated 445th Fighter Squadron, Jet Propelled on 18 January 1946
Inactivated on 3 July 1946
Redesignated 445th Fighter-Interceptor Squadron on 11 February 1953

- Activated on 20 March 1953
- Inactivated on 30 September 1968
- Consolidated with the 6512th Test Squadron on 1 October 1992

6512th Test Squadron

- Designated as the 6512th Test Squadron and activated on 1 October 1969
- Consolidated with the 445th Fighter-Interceptor Squadron on 1 October 1992
- Redesignated 445th Test Squadron on 2 October 1992
- Redesignated 445th Flight Test Squadron on 1 March 1994
- Inactivated on 30 November 2001
- Activated on 11 March 2004
- Inactivated on 1 May 2015
- Redesignated 445th Test Squadron on 6 June 2022

Activated on 29 June 2022

=== Assignments ===
- 50th Fighter Group, 24 February 1943
- Tactical Air Division, Army Air Forces Tactical Center, 10 February 1944
- 412th Fighter Group, 11 March 1944 – 3 July 1946
- 530th Air Defense Group, 20 March 1953
- 412th Fighter Group, 18 August 1955
- Sault Sainte Marie Air Defense Sector, 1 April 1960
- Detroit Air Defense Sector, 15 July 1963
- 34th Air Division, 1 April 1966 – 30 September 1968
- 6512th Test Group (later 6510 Test Wing), 1 October 1969
- Air Force Flight Test Center, 1 January 1973
- 6510th Test Wing (later 412th Test Wing), 1 March 1978
- 412th Operations Group, 1 October 1993 – 30 November 2001
- 412th Operations Group, 11 March 2004 – 1 May 2015
- 412th Operations Group, 29 June 2022 – present

=== Stations ===
- Orlando Army Air Base, Florida, 24 February 1943
- Muroc Army Air Field, California, 11 March 1944
- Palmdale Army Air Field, California, 1 June 1944
- Bakersfield Airport, California, 11 October 1944
- Santa Maria Army Air Field, California, 10 July 1945
- March Field, California, 3 December 1945 – 3 July 1946
- Geiger Field, Washington, 20 March 1953
- Wurtsmith Air Force Base, Michigan, 18 Aug 1955 – 30 Sep 1968
- Edwards Air Force Base, California, 1 Oct 1969 – 30 Nov 2001
- Edwards Air Force Base, California, 1 March 2004 – 1 May 2015
- Edwards Air Force Base, California, 29 June 2022 – present

=== Aircraft ===
==== Army Air Force School of Applied Tactics ====
- Curtiss A-25 Shrike (1944–1945)
- North American A-36 Apache (1943–1944)
- Boeing B-17 Flying Fortress (1943–1944)
- Lockheed P-38 Lightning (1943–1944)
- Bell P-39 Airacobra (1943–1944)
- Curtiss P-40 Warhawk (1943–1944)
- Republic P-47 Thunderbolt (1943–1944)
- North American P-51 Mustang (1943–1944)
- Bell P-63 Kingcobra (1943–1944)
- Douglas A-24 Banshee (1943–1944)
- Vultee BT-13 Valiant (1943–1944)
- Cessna C-78 Bobcat (1943–1944)
- Aeronca L-3 Grasshopper (1943–1944)
- Piper L-4 Grasshopper (1943–1944)
- Bristol Beaufighter (1943–1944)
- Kellett XR-3 (1943–1944)
- Sikorsky R-4 (1943–1944)

==== World War II Flight Testing ====
- Bell YP-59A Airacomet (1944–1945)
- Bell P-59B Airacomet (1945)
- Mitsubishi A6M Zero (1944–1945)
- Lockheed P-80 Shooting Star (1945–1946)

==== Cold War ====
- North American F-86D Sabre (1953–1955)
- Northrop F-89D Scorpion (1955–1956)
- Northrop F-89H Scorpion (1956–1960)
- McDonnell F-101B Voodoo (1960–1968)

==== USAF Flight Test Center ====
- LTV YA-7D, A-7D, VA-7F, A-7K Corsair II (1969–1992)
- Cessna NA-37B, OA-37B Dragonfly (1969–1994)
- McDonnell NF-4C, NF-4D, NF-4E, YF-4E, NRF-4C Phantom II (1969–1992)
- General Dynamics F-111A, F-111D, F-111G, FB-111A Aardvark (1969–1990)
- Bell UH-1N Huey (1969–1994)
- Cessna O-2A Skymaster, 1969–1994
- Cessna T-37B Tweet, 1969–1994
- Northrop T-38A, AT-38B, T-38C Talon, 1969–1994; 2004–2015
- de Havilland Canada UV-18 Twin Otter, 1969–1994
- McDonnell Douglas F-15A, F-15B, F-15C, F-15D Eagle, F-15E Strike Eagle (1972–1989; 1994–2001)
- General Dynamics F-16C, F-16D Fighting Falcon (2004–2015)
- Beechcraft C-12 Huron (2004–2015)
- Boeing KC-135R Stratotanker, 2004–2015

== See also ==
- List of United States Air Force test squadrons
