= 84th Fighter Wing =

84th Fighter Wing may refer to:

- 84th Fighter Wing (World War II), which was active from 1943 to 1945 and participated in the European Theater of World War II
- 84th Combat Sustainment Wing, which was a reserve organization as the 84th Fighter Wing from 1949 to 1951.
