= 530th Air Defense Group =

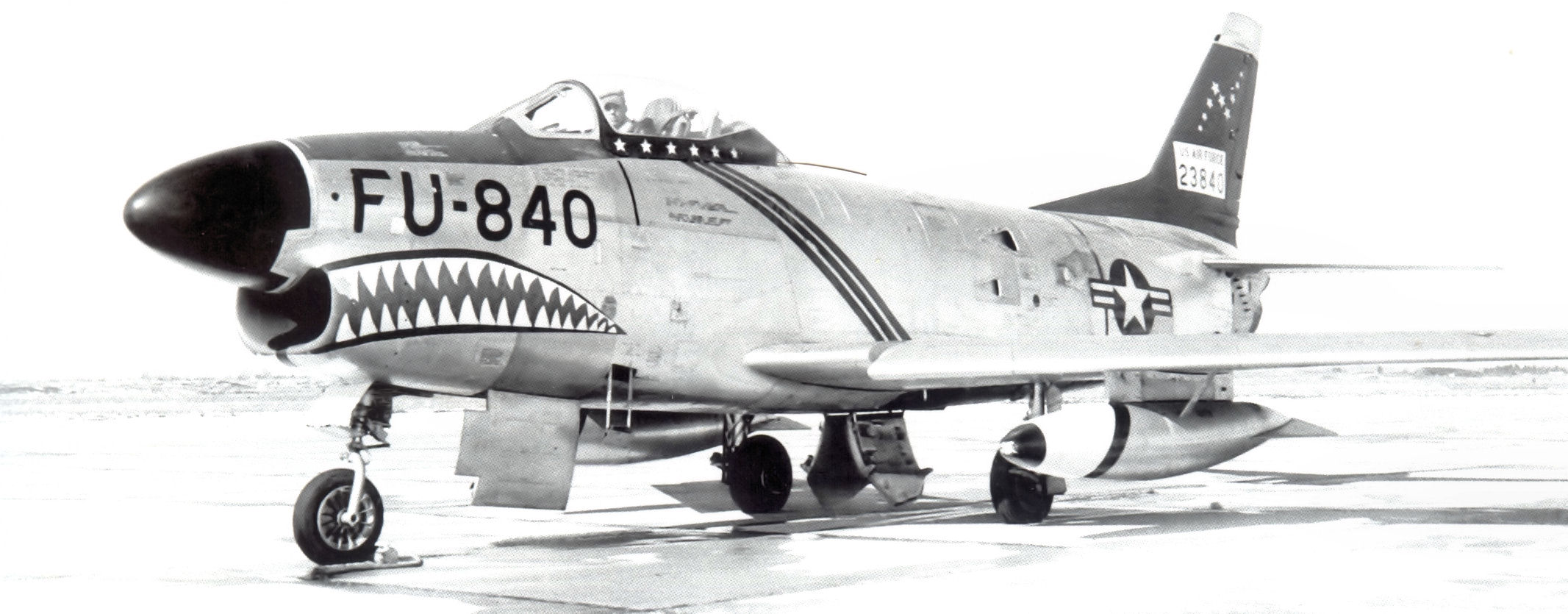
- 520th Fighter-Interceptor Squadron commander's F-86D (Note: Taken at Geiger Field in February 1955. Aircraft is North American F-86D-40-NA Sabre, serial 52-3840. This aircraft served until August 1960. It is on display at Lookout Mountain, Tennessee. Baugher, Joe (7 April 2023). "1953 USAF Serial Numbers". Joe Baugher.)
- Active: 1945; 1953–1955
- Country: United States
- Branch: United States Air Force
- Type: Fighter interceptor
- Role: Air defense

The 530th Air Defense Group is a disbanded United States Air Force organization. Its last assignment was with the 9th Air Division at Geiger Field, Washington, where it was inactivated on 18 August 1955. The group was originally activated as the 530th Air Service Group, a support unit for the 301st Bombardment Group at the end of World War II in Italy and then redeployed to the United States where it continued to support the 301st until it was inactivated in 1945.

The group was activated as the 530th Air Defense Group once again in 1953, when Air Defense Command (ADC) established it as the headquarters for a dispersed fighter-interceptor squadron and the medical, aircraft maintenance, and administrative squadrons supporting it. It was replaced in 1955 when ADC transferred its mission, equipment, and personnel to the 84th Fighter Group in a project that replaced air defense groups commanding fighter squadrons with fighter groups with distinguished records during World War II.

== History ==
=== World War II ===
The group was first activated as the 530th Air Service Group toward the end of World War II to provide support for a flying unit in Italy in 1945 as part of a reorganization of Army Air Forces (AAF) support groups in which the AAF replaced service groups that included personnel from other branches of the Army and supported two combat groups with air service groups including only Air Corps units, it was designed to support a single combat group. Its 956th Air Engineering Squadron provided maintenance that was beyond the capability of the combat group, its 780th Air Materiel Squadron handled all supply matters, and its Headquarters & Base Services Squadron provided other support. The 530th supported the 301st Bombardment Group at Foggia, Italy. The group returned to the United States and briefly supported the 301st Bombardment Group again at Pyote Army Air Field before all units at Pyote were inactivated in late 1945. The 530th was disbanded in 1948.

=== Cold War ===
During the Cold War the group was reconstituted, redesignated as the 530th Air Defense Group, and activated at Geiger Field on 18 February 1953 with responsibility for air defense of the Northwestern United States. The group replaced the 87th Air Base Squadron as the USAF host organization at Geiger Field. It was assigned three squadrons to perform its support responsibilities. The organizations it supported included its headquarters, the 4702d Defense Wing, and later the 9th Air Division. Its first operational squadron, the 440th Fighter-Interceptor Squadron (FIS), was activated at Geiger two days after the group. flying airborne intercept radar equipped and Mighty Mouse rocket armed North American F-86D Sabre aircraft. In March 1953, a second F-86D squadron, the 445th Fighter-Interceptor Squadron was activated at Geiger and assigned to the group.

In July 1954, the 440th FIS moved overseas and was reassigned away from the group. In December 1954, the 530th once again had two flying squadrons, when the 520th Fighter-Interceptor Squadron, another F-86D unit, was activated. The 530th was inactivated and replaced by the 84th Fighter Group (Air Defense) in 1955 as part of Air Defense Command's Project Arrow, which was designed to bring back on the active list the fighter units which had compiled memorable records in the two world wars. The group was disbanded again in 1984.

== Lineage ==
- Constituted as 530th Air Service Group on 16 December 1944

Activated on 18 May 1945
Inactivated on 17 October 1945
Disbanded on 8 October 1948

- Reconstituted and redesignated 530th Air Defense Group on 21 January 1953

Activated on 16 February 1953
Inactivated on 18 August 1955
Disbanded on 27 September 1984

=== Assignments ===
- Unknown, 1 June 1945 (Note: Probably XV Air Force Service Command.)
- 20th Bombardment Wing (later VIII Bomber Command), c. July 1945 – 17 October 1945
- 4702d Defense Wing, 16 February 1953
- 9th Air Division 8 October 1954 – 18 August 1955

=== Stations ===
- Foggia, Italy, 1 June 1945 – c. July 1945 (Note: Foggia was a center for Fifteenth Air Force heavy bombardment units. A complex of airfields was located nearby, and station information for the period is inconsistent. Lucera Airfield was also Foggia Airfield No. 12. Units stationed there are sometimes shown as located at Foggia, rather than Lucera.)
- Unknown, 1945, (Note: Possibly Lucera, Italy.) 18 May 1945
- Mountain Home Army Air Field, Idaho 17 August 1945 (Note: The reference shows the group's subordinate units only.)
- Pyote Army Airfield, 23 August 1945 – 17 October 1945
- Geiger Field, Washington, 16 February 1953 – 18 August 1955

=== Components ===
Operational Squadrons

- 440th Fighter-Interceptor Squadron, 18 February 1953 – 1 July 1954
- 445th Fighter-Interceptor Squadron, 20 March 1953 – 18 August 1955
- 520th Fighter-Interceptor Squadron, 8 December 1954 – 18 August 1955

Support Organizations

- 530th Air Base Squadron 16 February 1953 – 18 August 1955
- 530th Materiel Squadron 16 February 1953 – 18 August 1955
- 530th Medical Squadron (later 530th USAF Infirmary) 16 February 1953 – 18 August 1955
- 780th Air Materiel Squadron 18 May 1945 – 17 October 1945
- 956th Air Engineering Squadron 18 May 1945 – 17 October 1945

=== Aircraft ===
- North American F-86D Sabre, 1953–1955

== See also ==
- Aerospace Defense Command Fighter Squadrons
- List of F-86 Sabre units
