= 491st Fighter-Bomber Squadron =

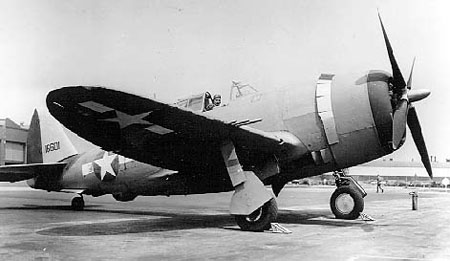
- P-47 Thunderbolt, last plane flown by the squadron
- Active: 1942-1944
- Country: United States
- Branch: United States Air Force
- Role: Fighter-bomber

Insignia
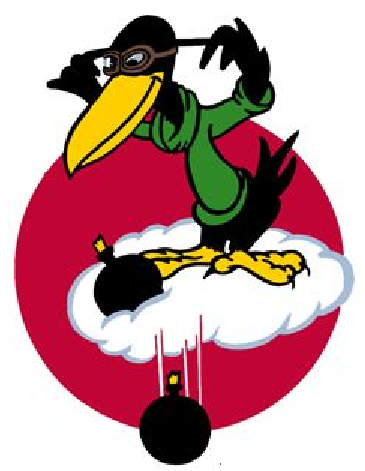
- 491st Fighter-Bomber Squadron emblem (Note: Approved 10 July 1943. Description: Over and through a red disc, a black caricatured crow, beak and feet yellow, wearing a green turtleneck sweater and brown aviator's goggles, dropping a black fire bomb to base, and standing on a white cloud formation, outlined light blue, which is supporting a second black fire bomb.)

The 491st Fighter-Bomber Squadron is an inactive United States Air Force unit. It was assigned to the 84th Fighter Group and served as a light bomber and fighter-bomber training unit. It was disbanded at Harding Field, Louisiana on 1 April 1944 in a general reorganization of Army Air Forces training units.

== History ==
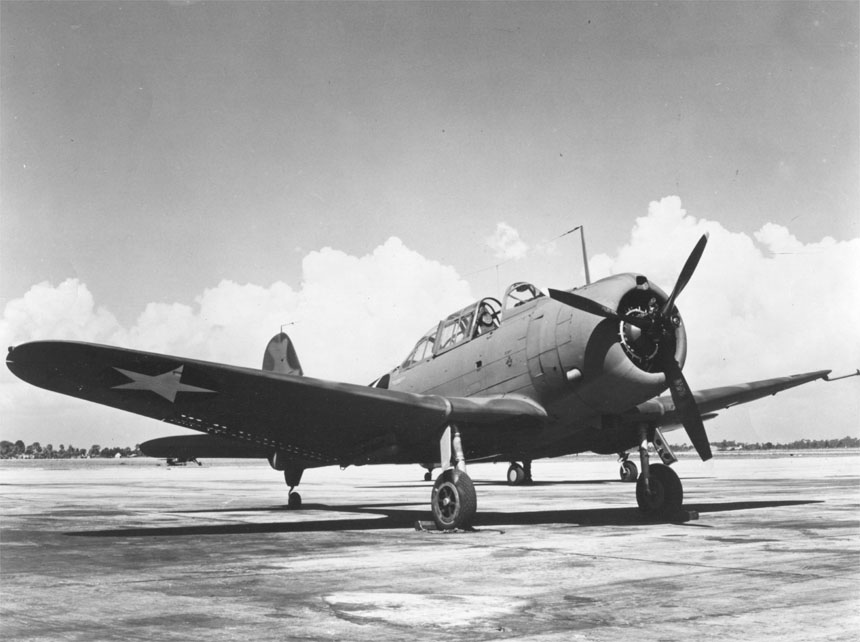
A-24 Banshee as flown by the squadron

The squadron was activated in 1942 as the 304th Bombardment Squadron (Light) at Savannah Air Base, Georgia, and equipped with Douglas A-24 Banshee dive bombers as one of the original squadrons of the 84th Bombardment Group. It received its initial cadre and equipment from the 3d Bombardment Group. It operated briefly with Vultee V-72 (A-31 Vengeance) aircraft, but its operations showed this aircraft was unsuitable for dive bombing. The squadron served as an Operational Training Unit (OTU), equipping with A-24 Banshees and Bell P-39 Airacobras.

The OTU program involved the use of an oversized parent unit to provide cadres to “satellite groups " The OTU program was patterned after the unit training system of the Royal Air Force. After forming the satellite groups, the parent unit assumed responsibility for satellite training and oversaw its expansion with graduates of Army Air Forces Training Command schools to become effective combat units. Phase I training concentrated on individual training in crewmember specialties. Phase II training emphasized the coordination for the crew to act as a team. The final phase concentrated on operation as a unit. The squadron contributed to the 84th Group's role as the parent for elements of several light bombardment groups. (Note: These units were the 85th, 311th, 312th, 319th, 405th and 407th Bombardment Groups.)

In August 1943, the squadron was redesignated the 491st Fighter-Bomber Squadron as were other Army Air Forces (AAF) single engine bombardment units, and was re-equipped with Republic P-47 Thunderbolts. It continued to serve as an OTU until October 1943. During the fall of 1943, operations dwindled and by the end of September 1943 only five aircraft were assigned to the entire 84th Group.

In October 1943, the squadron moved to Harding Field, Louisiana, where it became a Replacement Training Unit (RTU) and also participated occasionally in demonstrations and maneuvers. RTUs were also oversized units, but with the mission of training individual pilots or aircrews. However, the AAF found that standard military units, based on relatively inflexible tables of organization were not proving well adapted to the training mission. Accordingly, it adopted a more functional system in which each base was organized into a separate numbered unit. The squadron was, therefore, disbanded in April 1944 and replaced by the 263rd AAF Base Unit (Combat Crew Training School, Fighter), which took over the personnel, equipment and mission of the 84th Group and supporting units at Harding Field.

== Lineage ==
- Constituted as the 304th Bombardment Squadron (Light) on 13 January 1942

Activated on 10 February 1942
Redesignated 491st Fighter-Bomber Squadron on 10 August 1943
Disbanded on 1 April 1944

=== Assignments ===
- 84th Bombardment Group (later 84th Fighter-Bomber Group), 10 February 1942 – 1 April 1944

=== Stations ===
- Hunter Field, Georgia, 10 February 1942
- Drew Field, Florida, 8 February 1943
- Harding Field, Louisiana, 4 October 1943 – 1 April 1944

=== Aircraft ===
- Vultee V-72 Vengeance, 1942
- Douglas A-24 Banshee, 1942–1943
- Bell P-39 Airacobra, 1943
- Republic P-47 Thunderbolt, 1943–1944.

=== Campaigns ===
Campaign Streamer	Campaign	Dates	Notes
	American Theater without inscription	10 February 1942–1 April 1944	304th Bombardment Squadron (later 491st Fighter-Bomber Squadron)
