= 4702d Defense Wing =

4702nd Air Defense Wing
- Active: 1952-1954
- Country: United States
- Branch: United States Air Force
- Type: Fighter Interceptor and Radar
- Role: Air Defense
- Part of: Air Defense Command

The 4702nd Defense Wing (Def Wg) is a discontinued wing of the United States Air Force, last assigned to the 25th Air Division at Geiger Field, Washington. It was established in 1952 at Hamilton AFB, California in a general reorganization of Air Defense Command (ADC), which replaced wings responsible for a base with wings responsible for a geographical area. It moved twice in the first few months it was active and as a result became non operational until early 1953. It then assumed control of several Fighter Interceptor and Radar squadrons in the Pacific Northwest, some of which were Air National Guard squadrons mobilized for the Korean War. It was discontinued in the fall of 1954 and its units transferred to the new 9th Air Division.

== History ==
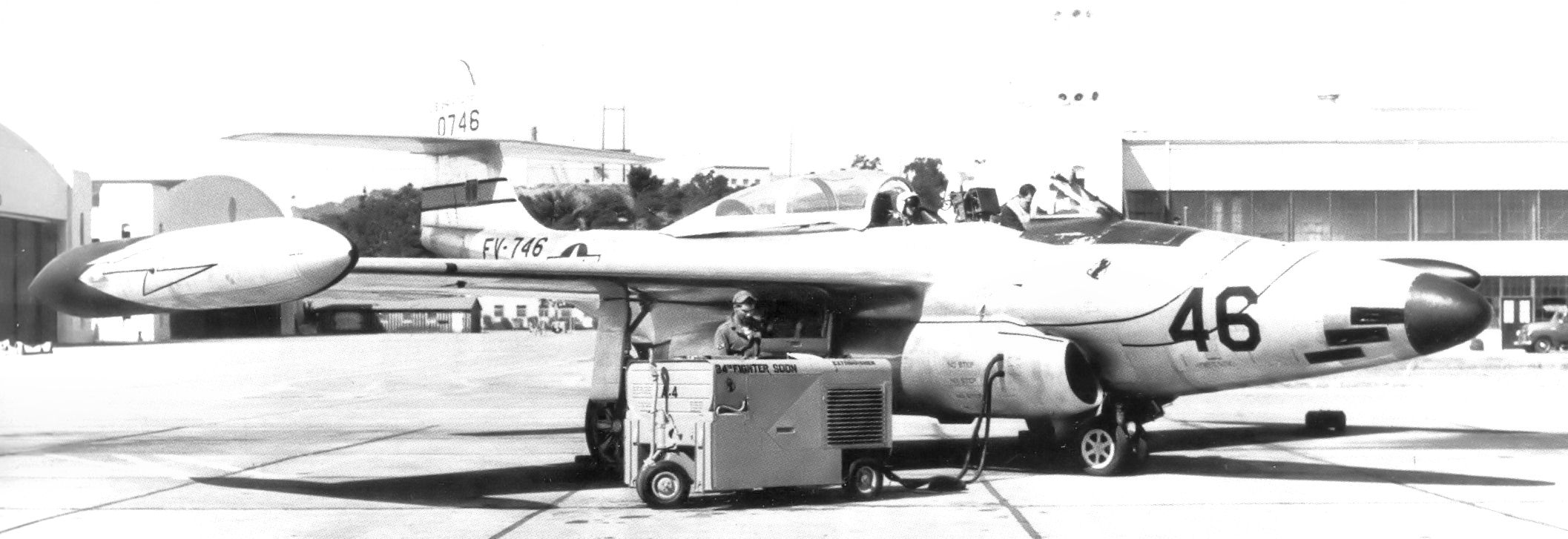
84th Fighter-Interceptor Squadron Northrop F-89C Scorpion at Hamilton Air Force Base, California, 1952.

The 4702nd Def Wg was organized on 1 February 1952 at Hamilton Air Force Base (AFB) as part of a major reorganization of Air Defense Command (ADC), due to the difficulty it experienced under the existing wing-base organizational structure in deploying fighter squadrons to the best advantage. The wing assumed operational control and the air defense mission of the 83d and 84th Fighter-Interceptor Squadrons (FIS), two fighter squadrons formerly assigned to the inactivating 78th Fighter-Interceptor Wing (FIW), both of which were flying Northrop F-89 Scorpion aircraft. The support elements of the 78th FIW were replaced at Hamilton by the wing's 566th Air Base Group (ABG) the same day. The wing's mission was to train and maintain tactical units in a state of combat readiness to intercept enemy aircraft attempting to penetrate the air defense system. However, the wing was initially unable to perform its mission satisfactorily due to problems with its F-89s.

In July 1952, the 83d FIS moved from Hamilton AFB to Paine Air Force Base, Washington State, and was reassigned from the wing a few days later. In November 1952, the wing moved to Geiger Field, Washington and the wing's units at Hamilton, the 566th ABG and the 84th FIS, were reassigned to the 28th Air Division. As a result of this move, the wing temporarily lost all of its operational units, but it assumed USAF host responsibility for Geiger Field through its newly assigned 87th Air Base Squadron, already stationed there.

In January 1953, the wing once again assumed an operational mission, when the 323d Fighter-Interceptor Squadron at Larson AFB, Washington flying radar equipped and rocket armed F-86 Sabre interceptor aircraft was assigned to the wing. Two other fighter-interceptor squadrons at Larson, the 31st, also flying Sabres and the 82d, flying F-94 Starfires were added later in the year, although the 82d FIS soon deployed overseas. Oddly, no fighter squadron at Geiger was ever assigned directly to the wing while wing headquarters was there. In another major ADC reorganization the following month, the wing assumed responsibility for the aircraft detection, warning and control mission with the assignment of the dispersed 636th-638th and 760th Aircraft Warning & Control (AC&W) Squadrons. and as ADC reorganized its fighter units, the 530th Air Defense Group, with two additional F-86 squadrons activated and also assumed host responsibilities for Geiger Field. The wing also added the 680th AC&W Sq, as well as five nationalized Air National Guard (ANG) AC&W Squadrons at Geiger Field. Later in 1953, the ANG squadrons were returned to ANG control and four of them were replaced by the regular USAF 682nd-685th AC&W Squadrons. These squadrons moved to other stations by the start of 1954 and were assigned to other ADC organizations.

The wing was discontinued in October 1954 and most of its units were assigned to the 9th Air Division (Defense), which was activated at Geiger.

== Lineage ==
- Designated as the 4702nd Defense Wing and organized on 1 February 1952

Discontinued on 8 October 1954

=== Assignments ===
- Western Air Defense Force, 1 February 1952
- 25th Air Division, 7 November 1952 – 8 October 1954

=== Components ===
==== Groups ====
- 530th Air Defense Group, 16 February 1953 – 8 October 1954
- 566th Air Base Group, 6 February 1952 – 7 November 1952

==== Fighter Squadrons ====
- 31st Fighter-Interceptor Squadron, 20 April 1953 – 8 October 1954

Larson AFB, WA

- 82nd Fighter-Interceptor Squadron: 16 February 1953 - 1 April 1953

Larson AFB, WA

- 83d Fighter-Interceptor Squadron, 6 February 1952 – 1 August 1952
- 84th Fighter-Interceptor Squadron, 6 February 1952 - 7 November 1952
- 323d Fighter-Interceptor Squadron, 19 January 1953 – 8 October 1954

==== Support Squadrons ====
- 13th Crash Rescue Boat Squadron (later 13th Crash Rescue Boat Flight), 6 February 1952 – 7 November 1952
- 87th Air Base Squadron, 7 November 1952 – 16 February 1953

==== Radar Squadrons ====
- 115th Aircraft Control and Warning Squadron (Federalized AL ANG), 16 February 1953 - 1 December 1953
- 134th Aircraft Control and Warning Squadron (Federalized TX ANG), 16 February 1953 - 1 October 1953
- 144th Aircraft Control and Warning Squadron (Federalized CA ANG), 16 February 1953 - 1 December 1953
- 145th Aircraft Control and Warning Squadron (Federalized CA ANG), 16 February 1953 - 1 December 1953
- 146th Aircraft Control and Warning Squadron (Federalized CA ANG), 16 February 1953 - 1 December 1953
- 636th Aircraft Control and Warning Squadron

Condon AFS, Oregon, 1 January 1953 – 1 October 1954

- 637th Aircraft Control and Warning Squadron

Saddle Mountain (later Othello AFS), Oregon, 1 January 1953 – 8 October 1954

- 638th Aircraft Control and Warning Squadron

Mount Bonaparte (later Curlew AFS), Washington, 1 January 1953 – 8 October 1954

- 680th Aircraft Control and Warning Squadron

Yaak AFS, Montana, 16 February 1953 – 8 October 1954

- 682d Aircraft Control and Warning Squadron

1 December 1953 – 1 January 1954 (moved to Kirtland AFB, NM)

- 683d Aircraft Control and Warning Squadron

1 December 1953 – 1 January 1954 (moved to Tinker AFB, OK)

- 684th Aircraft Control and Radar Squadron

1 December 1953 - 1 January 1954 (moved to Davis-Monthan AFB, AZ)

- 685th Aircraft Control and Warning Squadron

1 December 1953 – 1 January 1954 (moved to Kirtland AFB)

- 760th Aircraft Control and Warning Squadron

Colville AFS, Washington, 1 January 1953 – 8 October 1954

=== Stations ===
- Hamilton Air Force Base, California, 1 February 1952
- Geiger Field, Washington, 7 November 1952 – 8 October 1954

=== Commanders ===
- Col. T.W. Steed, 1 February 1952 - 7 Nov 1952
- Col. Joe H. Crakes, 7 November 1952 - unknown
- Col. Harrison R. Thyng, 14 August 1954 - 8 October 1954

=== Aircraft ===
- F-86D, 1953-1954
- F-89B, 1952
- F-89D, 1953
- F-94B, 1953

== See also ==
- List of USAF Aerospace Defense Command General Surveillance Radar Stations
- Aerospace Defense Command Fighter Squadrons
- List of United States Air Force aircraft control and warning squadrons
