= Condon Air Force Station =

United States radar station

Condon Air Force Station
- Part of Air Defense Command (ADC)
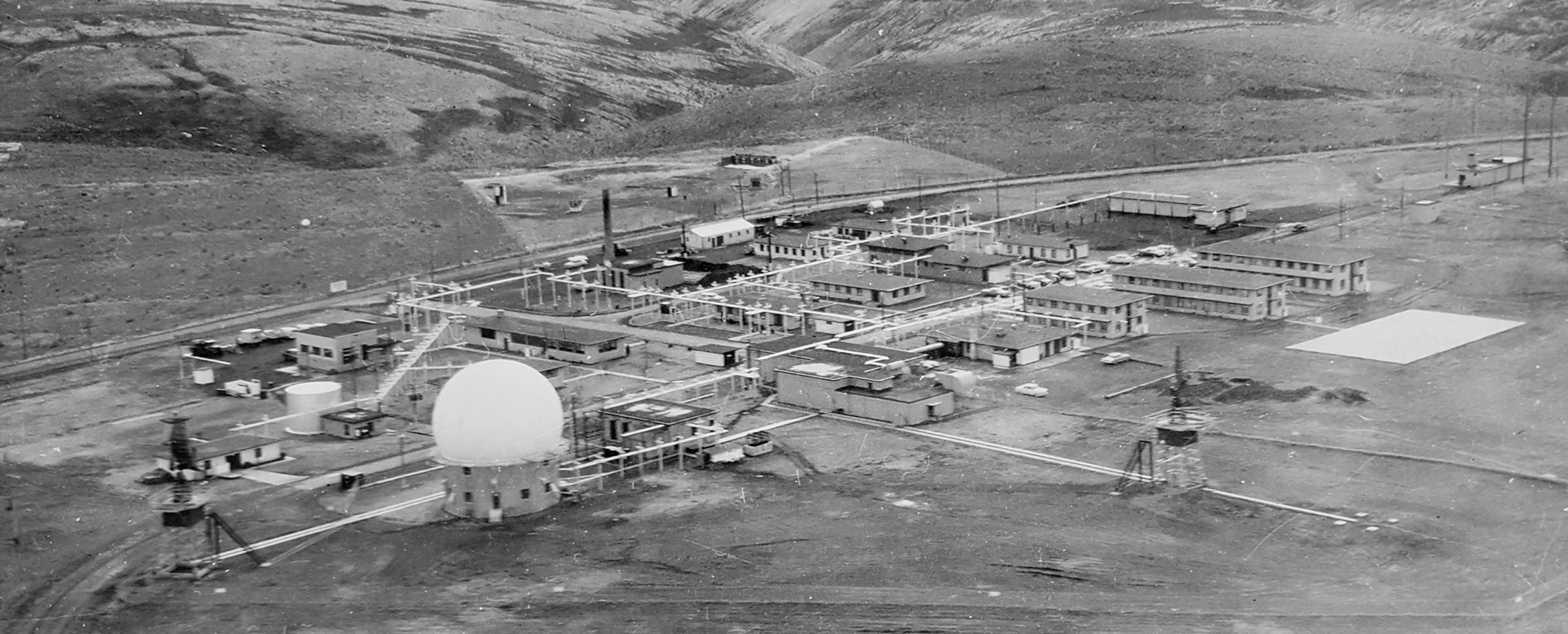
- Condon Air Force Station, circa 1962

Site information
- Type: Air Force Station
- Code: ADC ID: P-32, NORAD ID: Z-32
- Controlled by: United States Air Force

Location
- Location of Condon AFS, Oregon
- Coordinates: 45°14′12″N 120°18′06″W

Site history
- Built: 1951
- In use: 1951-1970

Garrison information
- Garrison: 636th Aircraft Control and Warning Squadron

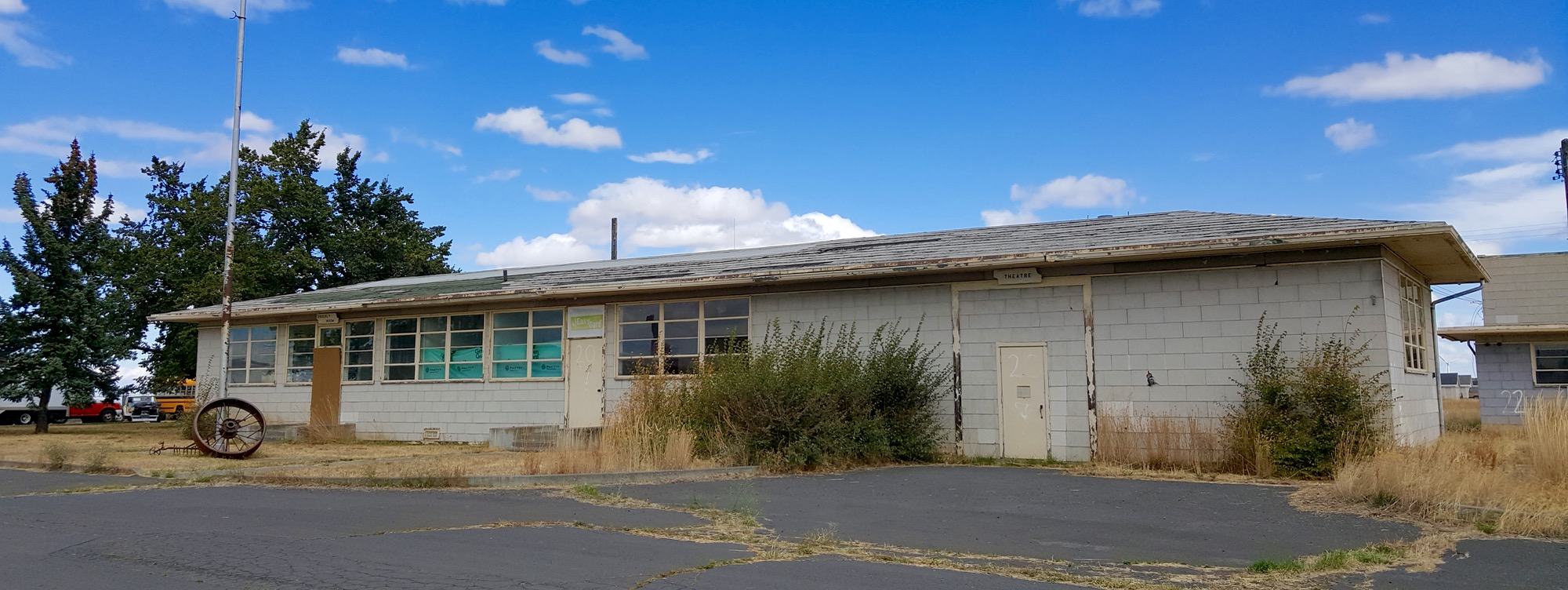
Former headquarters

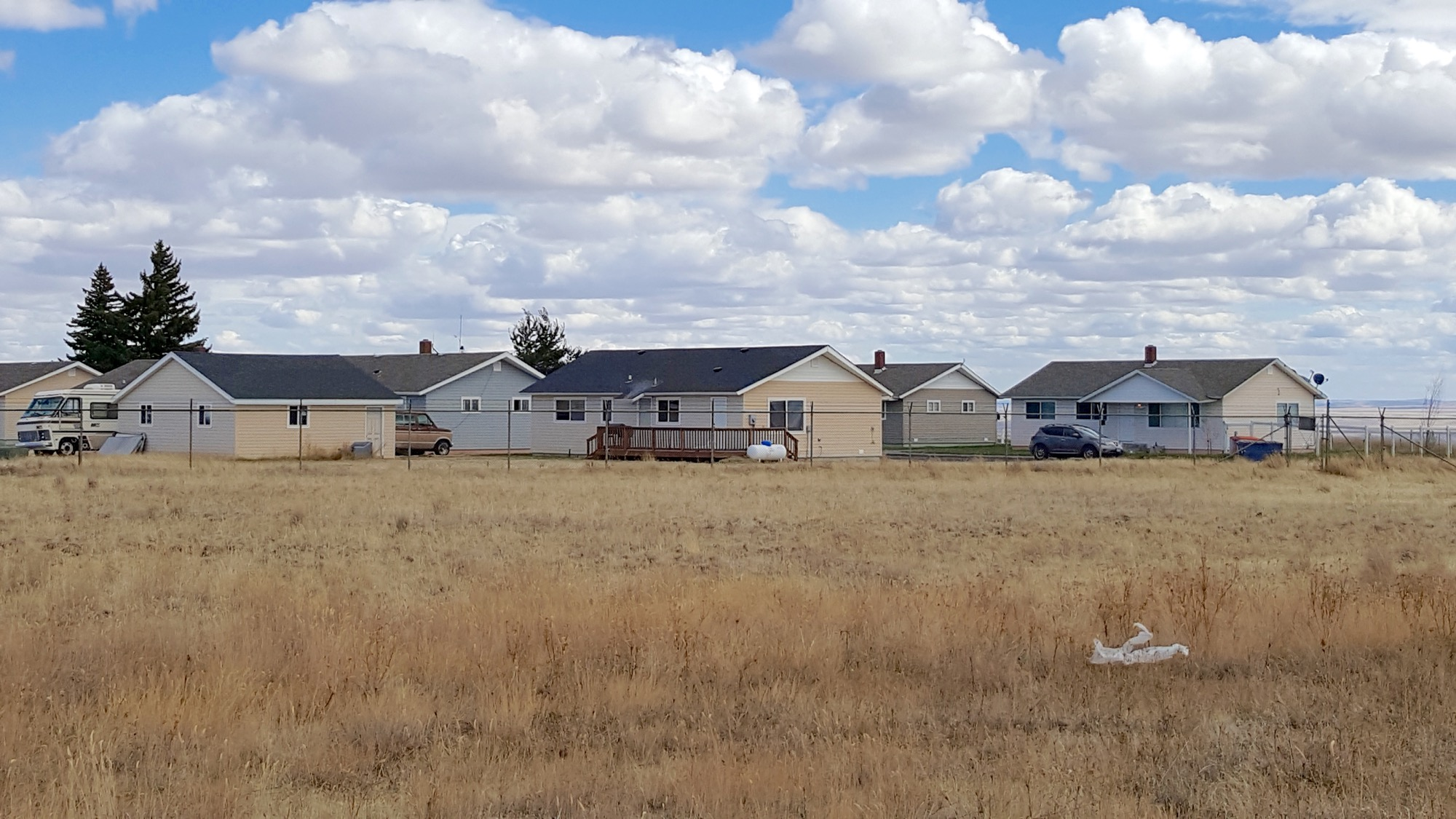
Former housing area

Condon Air Force Station is a closed United States Air Force General Surveillance Radar station. It is located 5.7 miles (9.2 km) west of Condon, Oregon. It was closed in 1970.

== History ==
Condon AFS was one of twenty-eight stations built as part of the second segment of the Air Defense Command permanent radar network. Prompted by the start of the Korean War, on 11 July 1950, the Secretary of the Air Force asked the Secretary of Defense for approval to expedite construction of the permanent network. Receiving the Defense Secretary's approval on 21 July, the Air Force directed the Corps of Engineers to proceed with construction.

The 636th Aircraft Control and Warning Squadron was assigned to the station on 15 August 1951, and initially the station functioned as a Ground-Control Intercept (GCI) and warning station. As a GCI station, the squadron's role was to guide interceptor aircraft toward unidentified intruders picked up on the unit's radar scopes. By 1952 the squadron was operating AN/FPS-3 search and AN/FPS-4 height-finder radars at Condon. These sets were replaced in 1957 and 1958 with AN/FPS-20 and AN/FPS-6 radars. In 1959 a second height-finder radar came with the installation of an AN/FPS-6A.

During 1960 Condon AFS joined the Semi Automatic Ground Environment (SAGE) system, feeding data to DC-15 at Larson AFB, Washington. After joining, the squadron was redesignated as the 636th Radar Squadron (SAGE) on 8 September 1960. The radar squadron provided information 24/7 to the SAGE Direction Center where it was analyzed to determine range, direction, altitude, speed, and whether or not aircraft were friendly or hostile. The AN/FPS-20 subsequently was upgraded in 1961 and redesignated as an AN/FPS-66. On 31 July 1963, the site was redesignated as NORAD ID Z-32.

In 1964 an AN/FPS-27 search radar was installed and in 1965 the AN/FPS-66 was relocated to Burns AFS, OR, to replace the AN/FPS-7B search radar there.

The Air Force inactivated the 636th Radar Squadron (SAGE) on 30 September 1970 as a result of budget restrictions, and the general phase down of air defense radar stations. Most of the site has been redeveloped for commercial use, the housing area being used as single-family homes.

== Air Force units and assignments ==
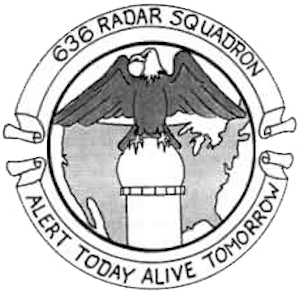
Emblem of the 636th Radar Squadron

Units:

- 636th Aircraft Control and Warning Squadron activated on 21 May 1947 at Hamilton AFB, CA

Moved to Condon AFS, Oregon from McChord AFB, Washington on 27 June 1951
Redesignated 636th Radar Squadron (SAGE) on 8 September 1960
Inactivated on 30 September 1970

Assignments:

- 505th Aircraft Control and Warning Group
- 25th Air Division, 6 February 1952
- 4702d Defense Wing, 1 January 1953
- 9th Air Division, 8 October 1954
- 25th Air Division, 15 August 1958
- 4700th Air Defense Wing, 1 September 1958
- Spokane Air Defense Sector, 15 March 1960
- Seattle Air Defense Sector, 1 June 1963
- 26th Air Division, 1 April 1966
- 25th Air Division, 15 September 1969 – 30 September 1970

== See also ==
- List of USAF Aerospace Defense Command General Surveillance Radar Stations
- List of United States Air Force aircraft control and warning squadrons
