= Mica Peak Air Force Station =

United States radar station

Mica Peak Air Force Station
- Part of Air Defense Command (ADC)

Site information
- Type: Air Force Station
- Controlled by: United States Air Force

Location
- Location of Mica Peak AFS, Washington
- Coordinates: 47°34′26″N 117°04′52″W

Site history
- Built: 1956
- In use: 1956-1979

Garrison information
- Garrison: 823d Aircraft Control and Warning Squadron

Mica Peak Air Force Station (ADC ID: SM-151, NORAD ID: Z-141) is a closed United States Air Force General Surveillance Radar station. It is located atop Mica Peak, 6.3 miles (10.1 km) east-northeast of Mica, Washington. It was closed in 1975 by the Air Force, and turned over to the Federal Aviation Administration (FAA).

Today the site is part of the Joint Surveillance System (JSS), designated by NORAD as Western Air Defense Sector (WADS) Ground Equipment Facility J-79.

== History ==
Mica Peak Air Force Station was initially part of Phase II of the Air Defense Command Mobile Radar program. The Air Force approved this expansion of the Mobile Radar program on 23 October 1952. Radars in this network were designated "SM." The station was logistically supported by the 9th Air Division at Geiger Field, Spokane, Washington.

The station became operational on 1 July 1956 when the 823d Aircraft Control and Warning Squadron was assigned to the new station on 1 July 1956. The squadron started operating AN/FPS-20 search and AN/MPS-14 radars, and initially the station functioned as a Ground-Control Intercept (GCI) and warning station. As a GCI station, the squadron's role was to guide interceptor aircraft toward unidentified intruders picked up on the unit's radar scopes. In 1959 Mica Peak AFS received an AN/FPS-6A height-finder radar, and began performing air-traffic-control duties for the Federal Aviation Administration (FAA).

During 1960 Mica Peak AFS joined the Semi Automatic Ground Environment (SAGE) system, initially feeding data to DC-15 at Larson AFB, Washington. After joining, the squadron was redesignated as the 823d Radar Squadron (SAGE) on 15 July 1960. The radar squadron provided information 24/7 to the SAGE Direction Center where it was analyzed to determine range, direction altitude speed and whether or not aircraft were friendly or hostile. In June 1963, the SAGE feed was switched to DC-12 at McChord AFB.

In 1962 the search radar was upgraded and redesignated as an AN/FPS-67. A year later, an AN/FPS-90 height-finder radar was added. The AN/MPS-14 was later retired. On 31 July 1963, the site was redesignated as NORAD ID Z-141.

In addition to the main facility, Mica Peak operated several AN/FPS-14 Gap Filler sites:

- Porthill, ID (SM-151C) 48°59′36″N 116°28′51″W
- Moyie Springs, ID (SM-151D) 48°45′48″N 116°12′34″W
- Yaak AFS, MT (SM-151E) 48°51′44″N 115°43′18″W

Over the years, the equipment at the station was upgraded or modified to improve the efficiency and accuracy of the information gathered by the radars. In 1967 the search radar was upgraded to an AN/FPS-67B. Routine operations were performed until 1975 when the 823rd Radar Squadron (SAGE) was inactivated on 1 July. Although the squadron was inactivated and most of the facility was closed, Mica Peak remained in operation staffed by various operating locations / detachments of the 25th Air Defense Squadron at McChord AFB. Circa 1977 the AN/FPS-90 was converted to an AN/FPS-116. The 25th ADS shut down operations on 1 October 1979.

The FAA assumed control of the station on 1 October 1979, however the Air Force maintained the height-finder radar until 1988 when that radar was retired. Through the mid-1990s, the FAA continued to operate the AN/FPS-67B set at this site. That radar was then replaced by an ARSR-4 in the late 1990s. Mica Peak remains an active Joint Surveillance System (JSS) site today.

== Air Force units and assignments ==
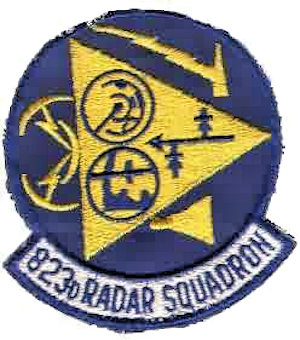
Emblem of the 823d Radar Squadron

=== Units ===
- Constituted as the 823d Aircraft Control and Warning Squadron on 30 December 1954

Activated at Geiger Field, Washington on 8 April 1955
Moved to Mica Peak AFS on 1 July 1956
Redesignated as 823d Radar Squadron (SAGE) on 1 September 1960
Inactivated on 1 June 1975

=== Assignments ===
- 9th Air Division, 1 July 1956
- 25th Air Division, 15 August 1958
- 4700th Air Defense Wing, 1 September 1958
- Spokane Air Defense Sector, 15 March 1960
- Seattle Air Defense Sector, 1 June 1963
- 25th Air Division, 1 April 1966 – 1 June 1975

== See also ==
- List of USAF Aerospace Defense Command General Surveillance Radar Stations
