= 825th Aircraft Control and Warning Squadron =

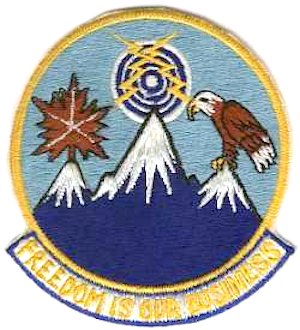
- Emblem of the 825th Aircraft Control and Warning Squadron
- Active: 1957-1962
- Country: United States
- Branch: United States Air Force
- Type: General Radar Surveillance

The 825th Aircraft Control and Warning Squadron is an inactive United States Air Force unit. It was last assigned to the Spokane Air Defense Sector, Air Defense Command, stationed at Kamloops Air Station, British Columbia, Canada. It was inactivated on 1 March 1963.

The unit was a General Surveillance Radar squadron providing for the air defense of North America.

== Lineage ==
- Constituted as the 825th Aircraft Control and Warning Squadron

Activated on 1 April 1957
Discontinued on 1 April 1962

== Assignments ==
- 25th Air Division, 1 April 1957
- Spokane Air Defense Sector, 15 March 1960 - 1 April 1962

Stations

- McChord AFB, Washington, 1 April 1957
- Kamloops Air Station, British Columbia, 1 September 1957 – 1 April 1962
