= Curlew Air Force Station =

US Air Force radar station

Curlew Air Force Station
- Part of Air Defense Command (ADC)

Site information
- Type: Air Force Station
- Controlled by: United States Air Force

Location
- Location of Curlew AFS, Washington
- Coordinates: 48°52′38″N 118°47′08″W

Site history
- Built: 1951
- In use: 1951-1959

Garrison information
- Garrison: 638th Aircraft Control and Warning Squadron

Curlew Air Force Station (ADC ID: LP-6, P-6) is a closed United States Air Force General Surveillance Radar station. It is located 16 miles (26 km) north of Republic, Washington. It was closed in 1959.

== History ==
Curlew Air Force Station was one of twenty-eight stations built as part of the second segment of the Air Defense Command permanent radar network. Prompted by the start of the Korean War, on 11 July 1950, the Secretary of the Air Force asked the Secretary of Defense for approval to expedite construction of the permanent network. Receiving the Defense Secretary's approval on 21 July, the Air Force directed the Corps of Engineers to proceed with construction.

The 638th Tactical Control Squadron was redesignated as the 638th Aircraft Control and Warning Squadron and activated at Mount Bonaparte AFS (LP-6), Washington on 5 May 1950. By March 1951 the squadron was operating an AN/TPS-1B medium-range search radar, and initially the station functioned as a Ground-Control Intercept (GCI) and warning station. As a GCI station, the squadron's role was to guide interceptor aircraft toward unidentified intruders picked up on the unit's radar scopes.

The permanent site (P-6) was moved to Bodie Mountain (Curlew AFS) on 1 December 1953, and the 638th AC&W Squadron began operating an AN/FPS-3 long-range search radar and an AN/FPS-5 height-finder radar beginning in January 1952. An AN/FPS-6 height-finder radar was installed in 1957. In 1959 the 638th AC&W Squadron was inactivated, and the station was converted to an unmanned gap-filler radar site (P-60C) to support Colville AFS (P-60) until the site was finally closed in December 1960.

Today, the radar site itself is obliterated, a few foundations and some crumbling concrete is all that remains. The cantonment area is used as a Job Corps center, known as the Curlew Civilian Conservation Center.

== Air Force units and assignments ==
Units:

- Former 638th Tactical Control Squadron redesignated 638th Aircraft Control and Warning Squadron
- Activated at Mount Bonaparte, WA 15 May 1950

Site renamed Curlew Air Force Station, 1 December 1953
Inactivated on 1 December 1959

Assignments:

- 505th Aircraft Control and Warning Group, 15 May 1950
- 162d Aircraft Control and Warning Group (Federalized AZ ANG), 25 May 1951
- 25th Air Division, 6 February 1952
- 4702d Defense Wing, 1 January 1953
- 9th Air Division, 8 October 1954
- 25th Air Division, 15 August 1958
- 4700th Air Defense Wing, 1 September 1958 – 1 December 1959

== See also ==
- List of USAF Aerospace Defense Command General Surveillance Radar Stations
- List of United States Air Force aircraft control and warning squadrons
