= 9th Space Division =

9th Space Division

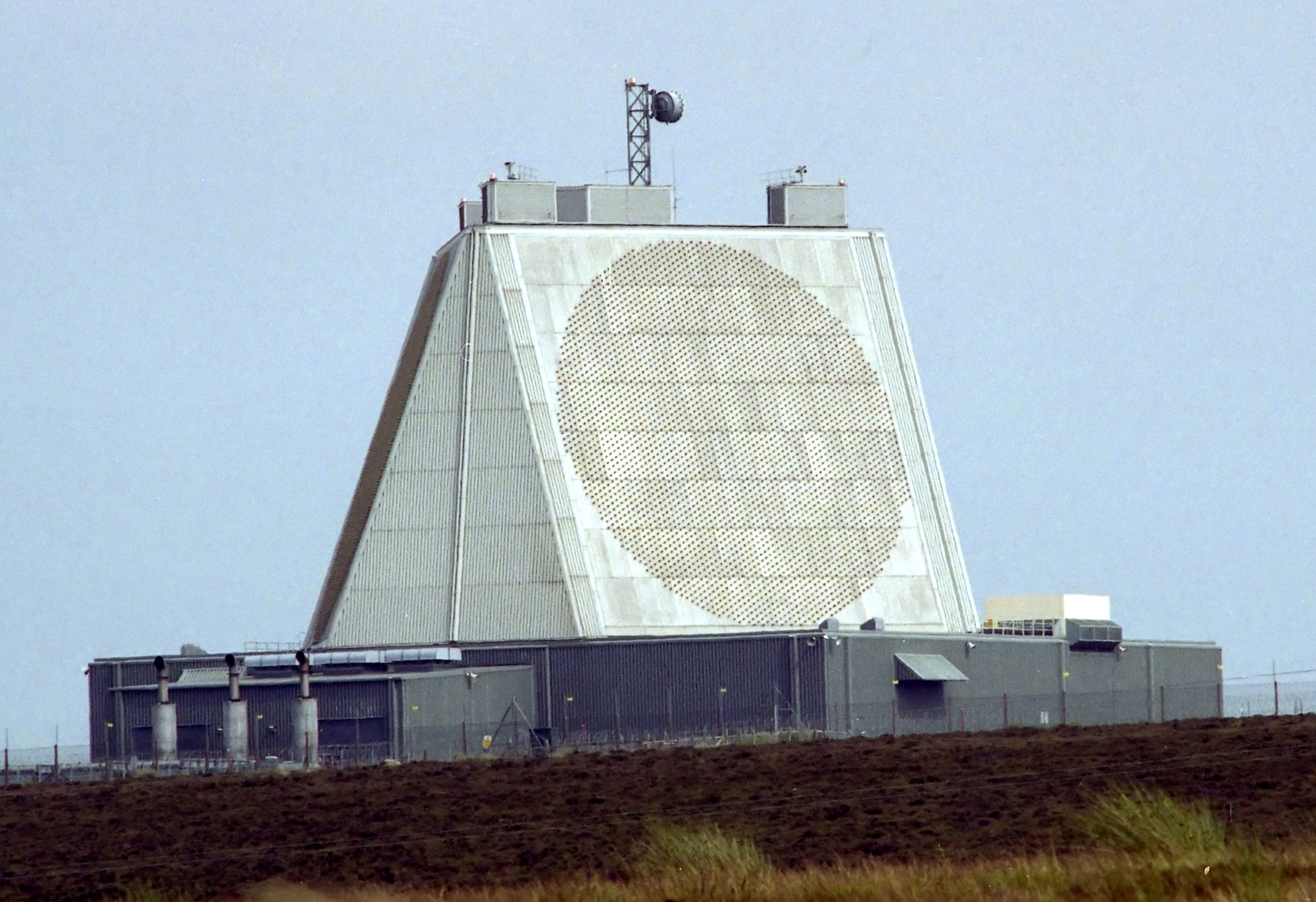
- Phased array missile detection radar at RAF Fylingdales
- Active: 1949–1950, 1954–1958, 1961–1968, 1990–1991
- Country: United States
- Branch: United States Air Force
- Role: Command of aerospace defense units

Insignia
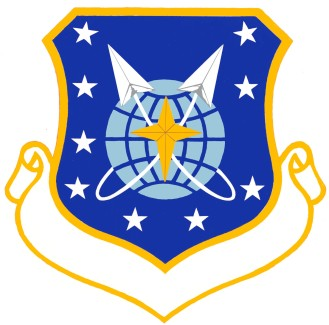
- 9th Space Division emblem (approved c. 4 September 1990)

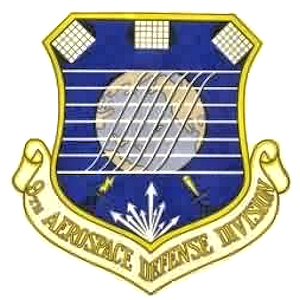
- 9th Aerospace Defense Division emblem

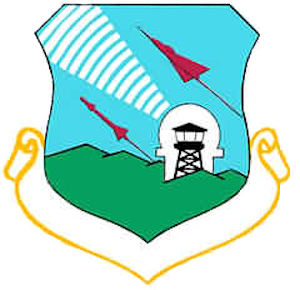
- 9th Air Division emblem

The 9th Space Division (9th SD) is an inactive United States Air Force organization. Its last assignment was with Air Force Space Command, being stationed at Patrick Air Force Base, Florida. It was inactivated on 1 October 1991.

== History ==
=== Tactical Air Command ===
The organization has had several periods of activation over its lifetime. Initially established in April 1949 as the 9th Air Division (Tactical) under Fourteenth Air Force, Continental Air Command at Pope Air Force Base, North Carolina, the command had no units assigned but was to act as a headquarters over tactical units. It was inactivated in August 1950.

=== Air defense ===
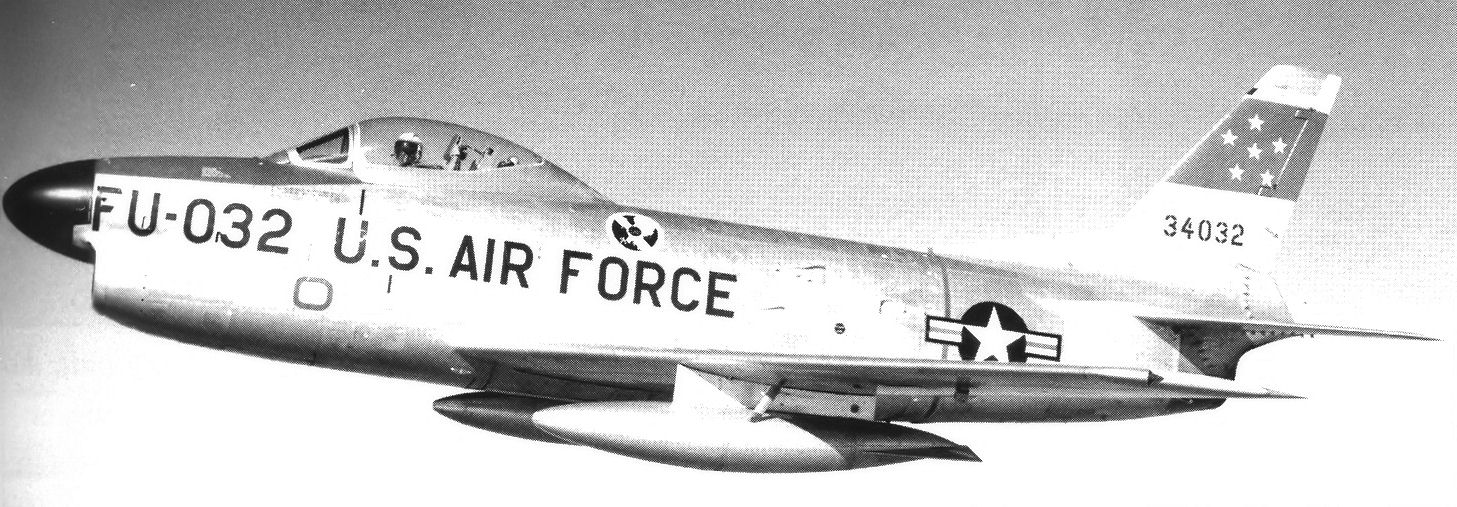
323d Fighter-Interceptor Squadron F-86D Sabre 53-4032 at Larson AFB 1954

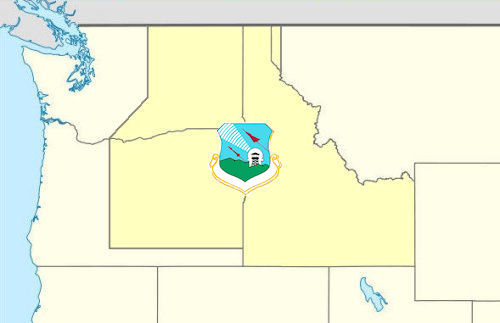
9th Air Division (Defense), 1954–1958

It was redesignated 9th Air Division (Defense) and reactivated in October 1954 by Air Defense Command (ADC) and assigned to Western Air Defense Force (WADF) at Geiger Field, Washington, taking over control of air defense units in eastern Washington, Oregon and Idaho from the 25th Air Division (AD), after the 25th AD was realigned over the Washington and Oregon coastal area west of the Cascade Mountains. It participated in the United States Air Force collateral mission of antisubmarine warfare and administered, equipped, and trained for combat. It was inactivated in 1958 when the Spokane Air Defense Sector was established by ADC to take over its responsibilities.

=== Aerospace and missile defense ===
The third incarnation of the organization began in 1961 with its reactivation as the 9th Aerospace Defense Division was associated with the North American Aerospace Defense Command by ADC, assuming responsibility for the Ballistic Missile Early Warning System, the Missile Defense Alarm System, the Space Detection and Tracking System (SPADATS), the NORAD combat operations Center, the Bomb Alarm System, and the Nuclear Detonation System.

During the Cuban Missile Crisis, the division implemented an improvised missile warning system directed toward the missile threat from Cuba called "Falling Leaves." In October 1962, the SPADATS AN/FPS-49 radar at Moorestown Air Force Station, New Jersey was reoriented south and directed toward Cuba. A communication network was established with Moorestown, the AN/FPS-78 radar at Laredo Air Force Base, Texas and the AN/FPS-35 radar site at Thomasville Air Force Station, Alabama. All three stations were in turn tied into the command centers at NORAD and at Strategic Air Command. This missile detection network remained in operation until 28 November and the Moorestown and Laredo sites were returned to their normal SPADATS mission when Soviet missiles were withdrawn from Cuba. The Thomasville station, retained coverage until late December as a precaution.

The division was inactivated in 1968 when its mission was elevated to a Numbered Air Force level, and transferred along with its personnel and equipment to the Fourteenth Aerospace Force on 1 July.

The most recent incarnation the 9th Space Division began in 1990 when Air Force Space Command (AFSPACECOM) reactivated the organization to provide an action mechanism to "operationalize" the space launch capabilities of Eastern Space and Missile Center (ESMC) and Western Space and Missile Center (WSMC) units transferred from Air Force Systems Command to AFSPACECOM during 1990–1991. ESMC and WSMC became respectively the 45th Space Wing and 30th Space Wing within two months of the Division's inactivation in 1991.

== Lineage ==
- Constituted as the 9th Air Division (Tactical) on 7 April 1949

Activated on 1 May 1949
Inactivated on 1 August 1950

- Redesignated 9th Air Division (Defense) on 21 June 1954

Activated on 8 October 1954
Inactivated on 15 August 1958

- Redesignated 9th Aerospace Defense Division and activated on 14 July 1961 (not organized)

Organized on 15 July 1961
Discontinued and inactivated on 1 July 1968

- Redesignated 9th Space Division on 11 September 1990

Activated on 1 October 1990
Inactivated on 1 October 1991

=== Assignments ===
- Fourteenth Air Force, 1 May 1949 – 1 August 1950
- Western Air Defense Force, 8 October 1954 – 15 August 1958
- Air (later, Aerospace) Defense Command, 14 July 1961 – 1 July 1968
- Air Force Space Command, 1 October 1990 – 1 October 1991

=== Stations ===
- Pope Air Force Base, North Carolina, 1 May 1949 – 1 August 1950
- Geiger Field, Washington, 8 October 1954 – 15 August 1958
- Ent Air Force Base, Colorado, 15 July 1961 – 1 July 1968
- Patrick Air Force Base, Florida, 1 October 1990 – 1 October 1991.

=== Components ===
Centers

- Eastern Space and Missile Center: 1 October 1990 – 1 October 1991

Patrick Air Force Base, Florida

- Western Space and Missile Center: 1 October 1990 – 1 October 1991

Vandenberg Air Force Base, California

Wings

- 71st Surveillance Wing (later 71 Missile Warning Wing): January 1962 – 1 July 1968

Ent Air Force Base, Colorado

- 73d Aerospace Surveillance Wing: 1 January 1967 – 1 July 1968.

Ent Air Force Base, Colorado

Groups

- 10th Aerospace Defense Group: 1 January 1967 – 1 July 1968

Vandenburg Air Force Base, California

- 84th Fighter Group (Air Defense), 18 August 1955 – 15 August 1958

Geiger Field, Washington

- 530th Air Defense Group: 18 February 1953 – 18 August 1955

Geiger Field, Washington

- 4721st Air Defense Group: 1 December 1956 – 15 August 1958.

Larson Air Force Base, Washington

Squadrons

- 1st Aerospace Surveillance and Control Squadron (later, l Aerospace Control Squadron): 1 October 1961 – 1 July 1968

Ent Air Force Base, Colorado

- 2d Surveillance Squadron: 1 February 1962 – 1 January 1967

Ent Air Force Base, Colorado

- 10 Aerospace Defense Squadron: 1 August 1964 – 1 January 1967

Vandenberg Air Force Base, California

- 31st Fighter-Interceptor Squadron: 8 October 1954 – 18 August 1955

Larson Air Force Base, Washington

- 322d Fighter-Interceptor Squadron: 18 August 1955 – 1 December 1956

Larson Air Force Base, Washington

- 323d Fighter-Interceptor Squadron: 8 October 1954 – 18 August 1955

Larson Air Force Base, Washington

- 538th Fighter-Interceptor Squadron: 18 August 1955 – 1 December 1956

Larson Air Force Base, Washington

- 4755th Ground Observer Squadron: 1 January 1955 – 25 March 1959

Geiger Field, Washington

- 634th Aircraft Control and Warning Squadron: 20 October 1954 – 15 August 1958

McChord Air Force Base, Washington

- 636th Aircraft Control and Warning Squadron: 8 October 1954 – 15 August 1958

Condon Air Force Station, Oregon

- 637th Aircraft Control and Warning Squadron: 8 October 1954 – 15 August 1958

Othello Air Force Station, Washington

- 638th Aircraft Control and Warning Squadron: 8 October 1954 – 15 August 1958

Curlew Air Force Station, Washington

- 760th Aircraft Control and Warning Squadron: 8 October 1954 – 15 August 1958

Colville Air Force Station, Washington

- 821st Aircraft Control and Warning Squadron: 8 September 1957 – 15 August 1958

Baker Air Force Station, Oregon

- 822d Aircraft Control and Warning Squadron: 8 September 1956 – 15 August 1958

Cottonwood Air Force Station, Idaho

- 823d Aircraft Control and Warning Squadron: 8 April 1955 – 15 August 1958

Mica Peak Air Force Station, Washington

== See also ==
- List of United States Air Force air divisions
- List of USAF Aerospace Defense Command General Surveillance Radar Stations
- Aerospace Defense Command Fighter Squadrons
- List of United States Air Force aircraft control and warning squadrons
