= CFS Kamloops =

Radar station in British Columbia, Canada 1957–1988

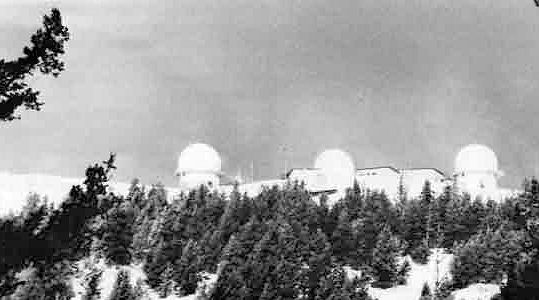
- 1977 photo

Site information
- Type: Radar Station
- Controlled by: Royal Canadian Air Force

Location
- Location of Canadian Forces Station Kamloops, British Columbia
- Coordinates: 50°48′08″N 120°07′36″W

Site history
- Built: 1957
- In use: 1957-1988
- Demolished: 2005

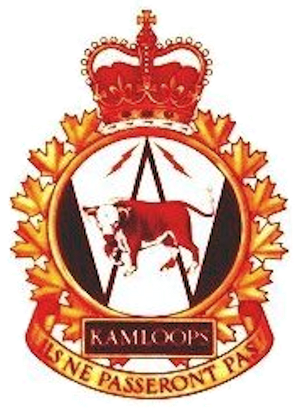
Station badge

Canadian Forces Station Kamloops (ADC ID: SM-153/C-153) is a closed General Surveillance Radar station. It is located 12.8 miles (20.6 km) northeast of Kamloops, British Columbia on the peak of Mount Lolo. It was closed in 1988 due to advances in military technology which made it obsolete.

It was operated as part of the Pinetree Line network controlled by NORAD.

== History ==
As a result of the Cold War and with the expansion of a North American continental air defence system, The site at Kamloops was selected as a site for a United States Air Force (USAF) radar station, one of the many that would make up the Pinetree Line of Ground-Control Intercept (GCI) radar sites. Construction on the base began in 1956 and was completed in 1957. The base was manned by members of the USAF's Air Defense Command (ADC) 825th Aircraft Control and Warning Squadron, being known as Kamloops Air Station.

In September 1957, operations began at the unit's permanent home. The station was equipped with AN/FPS-3A, AN/FPS-20, AN/FPS-87A; AN/FPS-6B, and AN/FPS-507 radars.

As a GCI base, the 918th's role was to guide interceptor aircraft toward unidentified intruders picked up on the unit's radar scopes. These interceptors were based at the 25th Air Division, Larson Air Force Base in Washington.

In the early 1960s, the USAF relinquished control of the base to the Royal Canadian Air Force (RCAF). This was part of an arrangement with the United States that came as a result of the cancellation of the Avro Arrow. Canada would lease 66 F-101 Voodoo fighters and take over operation of 12 Pinetree radar bases.

Upon hand-over on 1 April 1962, the operating unit was inactivated and replaced by the RCAF No. 56 Aircraft Control & Warning Squadron and the base became RCAF Station Kamloops. Radars at the station were also upgraded to the following:

- Search Radars: AN/FPS-3A, AN/FPS-20, AN/FPS-87A
- Height Radars: AN/CPS-6B, AN/FPS-507

Radar operations at 56 Squadron were automated on 1 May 1963 by the Semi Automatic Ground Environment (SAGE) system, and the station became a long-range radar site. It would no longer guide interceptors but only look for enemy aircraft, feeding data to the Spokane Air Defense Sector SAGE DC-15 Direction Center of the 25th NORAD Region.

As a result of the unification of the Canadian Forces in 1968, the new Canadian Forces organization absorbed the RCAF, RCN and the Canadian Army. 56 Radar Squadron, RCAF Station Kamloops, became simply Canadian Forces Station (CFS) Kamloops in 1967.

A small trailer park called McNair Park was established on the site for married personnel and workers who had their own mobile homes. McNair Park has been fully decommissioned and no longer exists.

Beginning in 1983 the station began reporting to Canada West ROCC. CFS Kamloops closed on 1 April 1988, the 64th anniversary of the Royal Canadian Air Force.

The Station briefly came back to life when the movie "Cadence", starring Charlie Sheen and Laurence Fishburne, was filmed at the site in 1990. All structures on site were fully demolished in 2005, and after extensive environmental remediation and 26 years of petitioning, the land was returned to the Tk'emlúps te Secwe̓pemc and officially incorporated into Kamloops Indian Reserve #1 on 20 August 2012.

Today, the site is now used by Telus, which has a communication installation. The city of Kamloops moved the last search antenna to be used at CFS Kamloops, an AN/FPS-20, to the north west corner of Exhibition Park as a memorial to the former radar station. The memorial plaque reads:

History of Canadian Forces Station Kamloops 1957-1988. Construction of the radar station at Kamloops Commenced in 1956, with the unit being designed as an early warning radar site to augment the Pine Tree Radar Chain. A limited degree of operations was achieved by December 1958. The station was first manned by American Air Force personnel and became home of the 825th Radar Squadron. On 1 April 1962, the Royal Canadian Air Force accepted responsibility for the manning of the radar station. This brought about the disbandment of the American squadron and the formation of 56 AC and W Squadron, RCAF Station Kamloops. The 56 AC and W remained in existence until 30 August 1967, when as a result of unification of the forces, the unit was officially redesignated Canadian Forces Station Kamloops. The station motto 'ILS NE PASSERONT PAS" translates to 'THEY SHALL NOT PASS'. The Canadian military and civilians manned the site around the clock to provide for Canadian defence as part of North American Air Defence NORAD. Operations ceased on April 1988 and the station closed on August 1, 1988.

== See also ==
- List of Royal Canadian Air Force stations
- List of USAF Aerospace Defense Command General Surveillance Radar Stations
