= 919th Aircraft Control and Warning Squadron =

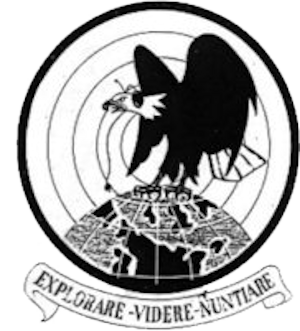
- Emblem of the 919th Aircraft Control and Warning Squadron
- Active: 1952-1963
- Country: United States
- Branch: United States Air Force
- Type: General Radar Surveillance

The 919th Aircraft Control and Warning Squadron is an inactive United States Air Force unit. It was last assigned to the Spokane Air Defense Sector, Air Defense Command, stationed at Saskatoon Mountain Air Station, Alberta, Canada. It was inactivated on 1 April 1963.

The unit was a General Surveillance Radar squadron providing for the air defense of North America.

Lineage

- Activated as 919th Aircraft Control and Warning Squadron, 16 April 1952

Discontinued 1 April 1963

Assignments

- Western Air Defense Force, 16 April 1952
- 25th Air Division, 16 February 1953 – 1 April 1963

Stations

- Geiger Field, Washington, 16 April 1952
- Saskatoon Mountain AS, Alberta, 1 June 1953 – 1 April 1963
