= Cottonwood Butte =

Ski area in Colorado, United States

- Location in Idaho Cottonwood Butte (the United States)
- Location: Idaho County, Idaho, U.S.
- Nearest city: Cottonwood: 6 mi (10 km)
- Coordinates: 46.0755°N 116.4528°W
- Vertical: 845 ft (258 m)
- Top elevation: 5,730 ft (1,747 m); 5,566 ft (1,697 m) - lift
- Base elevation: 4,721 ft (1,439 m)
- Skiable area: 260 acres (1.1 km^{2})
- Trails: 7
- Longest run: 0.7 mi (1.1 km)
- Lift system: 1 T-bar; 1 rope tow
- Snowfall: 45 in (110 cm)
- Snowmaking: no
- Night skiing: Fridays in January
- Website: cottonwoodbutte.org

Cottonwood Butte is a mountain and modest ski area in the western United States, located in north central Idaho, west of nearby Cottonwood. Its summit elevation is 5,730 feet (1,747 m) above sea level and is the highest point on the Camas Prairie, 2,100 feet (640 m) above Cottonwood.

== Ski area ==
The ski lift unloads about 160 feet (50 m) below the summit at 5,566 feet (1,697 m), yielding a vertical drop of 845 feet (258 m). The slopes are on the northeast flank of the mountain, served by two surface lifts: a T-bar and a rope tow. The average snowfall is 45 inches (110 cm).

The ski area opened 59 years ago in 1967, although skiing had previously taken place on the mountain with portable ski tows.

The area operates from 10 am to 4 pm on weekends and holidays, and Friday nights (6–10 pm) in January.

== Radar station ==
During the Cold War, the mountain was the site of Cottonwood Air Force Station, an early warning radar installation of the U.S. Air Force. The project was made public in 1955, construction began in 1956, and it went operational in early 1959. The radar tower was at the summit and the cantonment of the station was at 4,400 feet (1,340 m), about a mile (1.6 km) below the present base of the ski area on Radar Road. The 27-unit family housing area was built in the city of Cottonwood, on Butte Drive in the north end.

The radar was significantly upgraded with a new tower in 1962, but the station was obsolete within three years and was deactivated.

=== Job Corps ===
The buildings of the cantonment became a Job Corps center in 1965, supervised by the U.S. Forest Service.

=== Correctional facility ===
After nine years, the Job Corps center was transferred to the state of Idaho in 1974, and was converted to the minimum-security North Idaho Correctional Institution (NICI).

The state's department of lands built a fire lookout at the summit, which also supports various communications towers.

== Video ==
- Cottonwood Butte
