= 10th Aerospace Defense Group =

10th Aerospace Defense Group

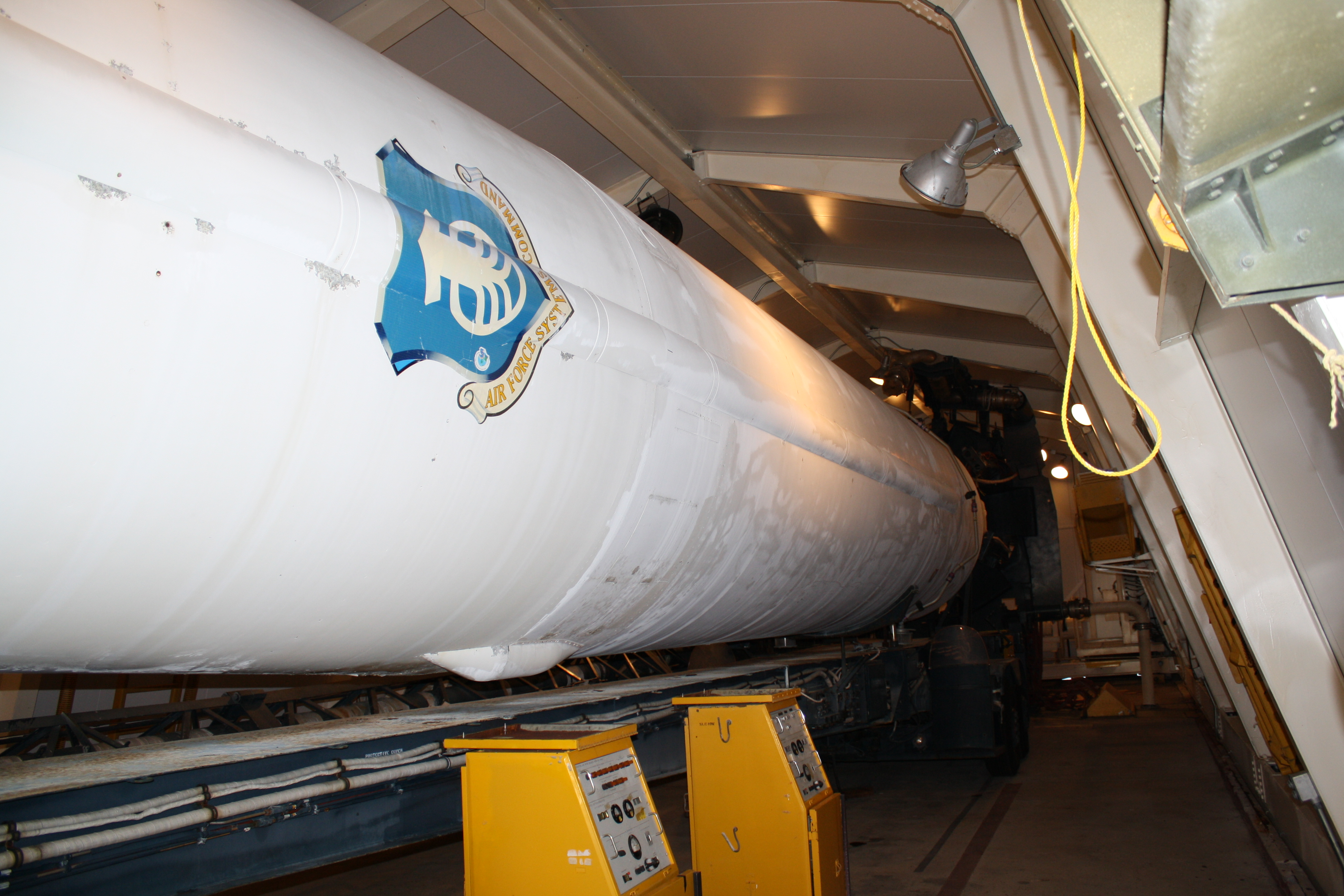
- WS 437 Thor missile at Vandenberg AFB
- Active: Squadron: 1962–1967; 1970–1979; 1992–1997; Group: 1967–1970
- Country: United States
- Branch: United States Air Force
- Role: Air Defense
- Part of: Aerospace Defense Command 1962–1979; Pacific Air Forces 1992–1997
- Motto(s): Caveat Aggressor Latin Aggressor Beware (1963–1967) Island Defender (1992–1997)
- Equipment: PGM-17 Thor
- Decorations: Air Force Outstanding Unit Award

Insignia
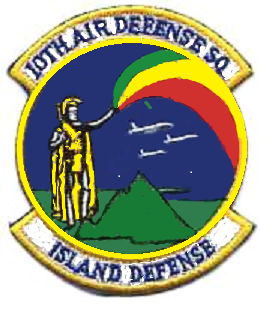
- 10 Air Defense Squadron emblem

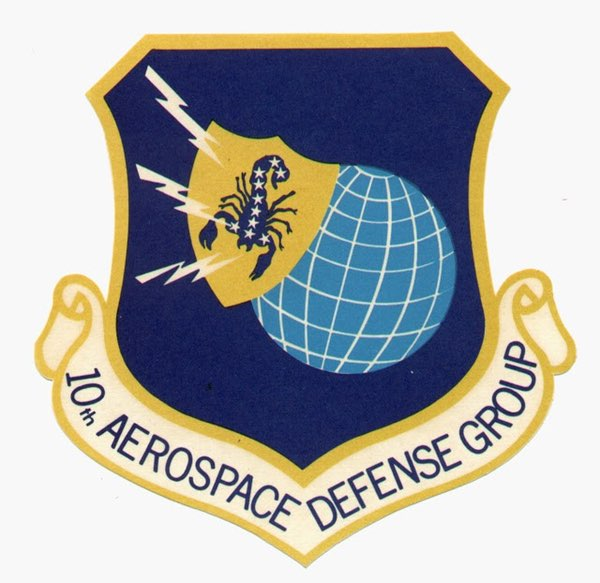
- 10th Aerospace Defense Group emblem

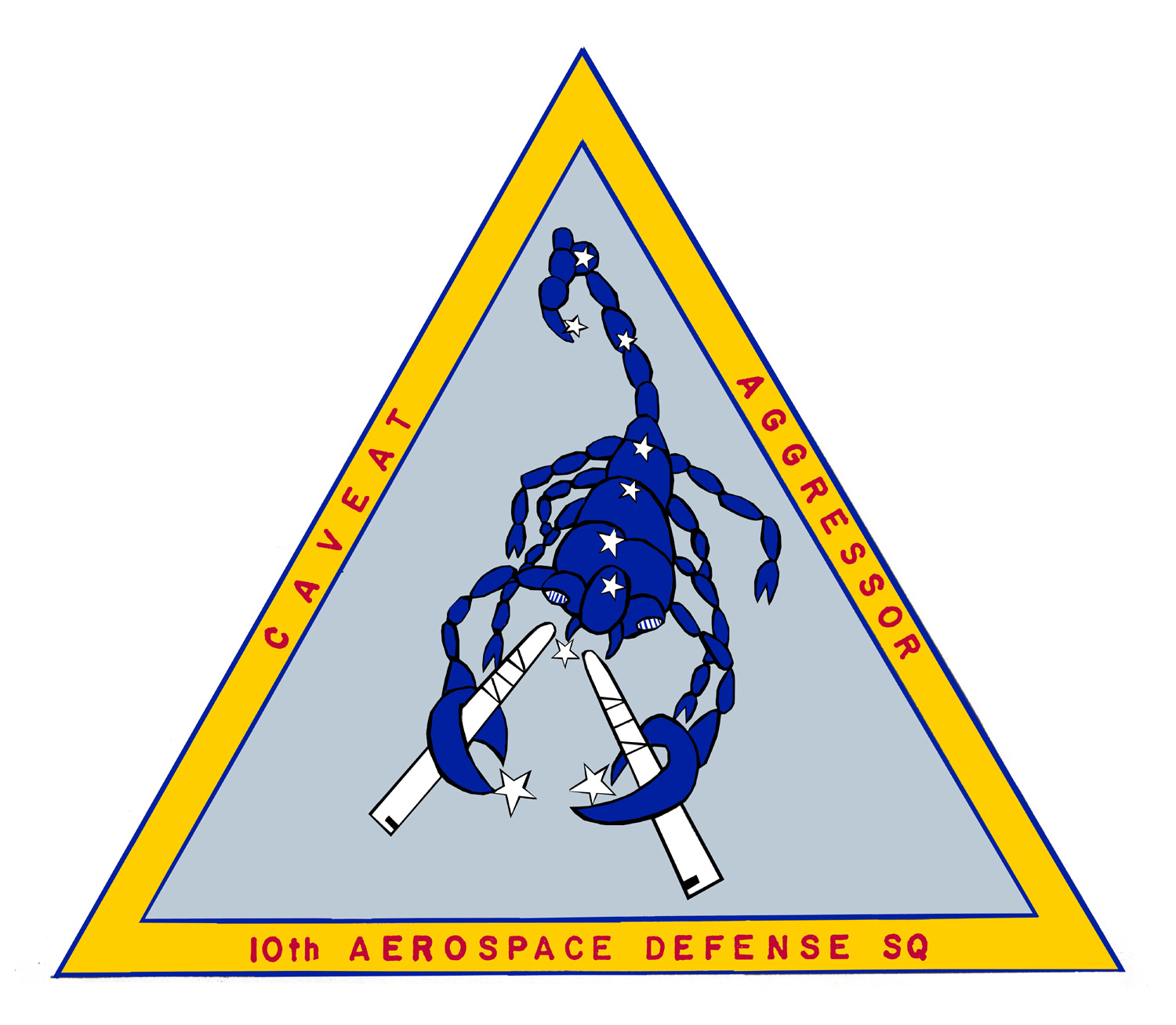
- 10th Aerospace Defense Squadron emblem (Note: On a light blue triangle within a wide Air Force yellow border edged and shaded Air Force Blue, originating from top of triangle curving through center facing viewer's left an Air Force Blue scorpion, claws extended grasping 2 white missiles edged and detailed black issuing diagonally one from right base, one from left pointing to center toward scorpion. Overall ten white stars edged black placed in an inverted stylized pattern of the Scorpius constellation. At base Air Force yellow border forms a scroll inscribed "Caveat Aggressor" in red capital letters. Approved 21 November 1963. Bailey. The light blue background is the limitless sky. The ten stars placed in a Scorpius constellation formation over a scorpion alludes to a Greek mythological legend and is symbolic of deadly powers. The missiles held by the scorpion and the motto "Beware Aggressor" refer to the mission of the squadron. The colors blue and golden yellow are the Air Force colors.)

The 10th Aerospace Defense Group was inactivated on 31 December 1970 by the United States Air Force (USAF). Its last assignment was with Fourteenth Aerospace Force at Vandenberg Air Force Base, California. The 10th Aerospace Defense Group and Squadron were the sole operators of the United States' second nuclear-tipped anti-satellite weapon, Weapons System 437 (WS-437). For this reason the squadron continues the group history through temporary bestowal.

The United States Air Force's 10th Air Defense Squadron is also an inactive USAF organization, that preceded and followed the 10th group at Vandenberg as the 10th Aerospace Defense Squadron. Once WS-437 became non-operational in the 1970s, the squadron assumed the mission of launching Defense Meteorological Satellite Program satellites into orbit until its mission was transferred. It was later activated an air defense unit and from 1992 to 1997 was located at Wheeler AFS, Hawaii.

== History ==
=== Space mission ===
==== Anti-satellite defense ====
The 10th Aerospace Defense Squadron was activated in late 1963 to operate Weapons System 437, using nuclear equipped Thor missiles. The squadron was located at Vandenberg Air Force Base, California, but launch facilities were at Johnston Island Air Force Base. Two missiles were stationed at each location.

In 1961, Air Force Systems Command (AFSC) had formed the 6595th Test Squadron to perform operational testing on the system. As the program approached operational status, AFSC transferred the 6595th to Air Defense Command (ADC) (Note: In January 1968 Air Defense Command became Aerospace Defense Command.) in November 1962. ADC discontinued the test squadron and used its personnel and equipment to activate the 10th Aerospace Defense Squadron The group replaced the squadron in 1967. The Johnston Island location was upgraded to a subordinate squadron at the same time.

==== Defense Meteorological Satellite Program ====
At the end of 1970, the 10th Squadron replaced the group and the 24th Aerospace Defense Squadron. WS 437 was put into standby status with the squadron maintaining system components. The squadron then changed its mission to support of the Defense Meteorological Satellite Program (DMSP). The DMSP mission was performed by Strategic Air Command until it was transferred to ADC in 1970.

The DMSP generates terrestrial and space weather data for United States operational forces worldwide. Data from this program is also furnished to the civilian community through the Department of Commerce. DMSP satellites circle the Earth at an altitude of about 500 miles in a near-polar, Sun-synchronous orbit. The Block 5 DMSP satellites launched during the time the squadron was active used Thor launchers (similar to those used by WS 437) to boost them into orbit. In 1979, the squadron was inactivated when responsibility for management of the DMSP program was transferred to Space Division of AFSC. Unfortunately, the squadron remained responsible for operational DMSP launches, "the [AFSC] program office authorized launch of the last Block 5C satellite on 19 February 1976 with incorrect weight-to-propellant-loading calculations. Launched from Vandenberg Air Force Base, the Thor/Burner II booster rose majestically through the atmosphere, reached the edge of space, exhausted its propellant, and the DMSP satellite whistled back to Earth—a total loss."

=== Air defense in Hawaii ===
In 1992, the 10th squadron was again activated as the 10th Air Defense Squadron, replacing the 6010th Aerospace Defense Group at Wheeler Air Force Base when the USAF eliminated or redesignated all existing MAJCON (major command controlled) four digit units. The 6010th had been formed by upgrading the 6010th Aerospace Defense Flight in 1989 when the 327th Air Division was inactivated.

The squadron coordinated air defense activities in Hawaii with the Hawaii Air National Guard and maintained operational control of Air National Guard alert aircraft. The squadron supervised aircraft control and warning units within the Pacific Islands Defense Region, directing aircraft operations and defense activities from its Air Defense Control Center. The squadron continued these activities until it was inactivated in 1997.

== Lineage ==
10th Aerospace Defense Group

- Constituted as the 10th Aerospace Defense Group in 1966 and activated (not organized)

Organized on 1 January 1967
Inactivated on 31 December 1970

10th Air Defense Squadron

- Constituted as the 10th Aerospace Defense Squadron on 24 October 1963 (not organized)

Organized on 15 November 1963
Inactivated on 1 January 1967
Activated on 31 December 1970
Inactivated 1 November 1979

- Redesignated 10th Air Defense Squadron

Activated on 1 April 1992

- Inactivated on 30 September 1997

=== Assignments ===
10th Aerospace Defense Group

- Air Defense Command 1966
- 9th Aerospace Defense Division, 1 January 1967
- Fourteenth Aerospace Force, 1 July 1968 – 31 December 1970

10th Air Defense Squadron

- Air Defense Command 24 October 1963 (not organized until 15 November 1963)
- 9th Aerospace Defense Division, 1 August 1964 – 1 January 1967
- Fourteenth Aerospace Force, 31 December 1970
- Aerospace Defense Command 1 October 1976 – 1 November 1979
- 15th Operations Group: 13 April 1992 – 30 September 1997

=== Components ===
10th Aerospace Defense Group

- 24th Aerospace Support Squadron (later 24th Support Squadron, 24th Aerospace Defense Squadron), 1 January 1967 – 31 December 1970

Stationed at Johnston Island Air Force Base

=== Stations ===
10th Aerospace Group

- Vandenberg Air Force Base, California: 1 January 1967 – 31 December 1970

10th Air Defense Squadron

- Vandenberg Air Force Base, California: 15 November 1963 – 1 January 1967
- Vandenberg Air Force Base, California: 31 December 1970 – 1 November 1979
- Wheeler Air Force Station (later Wheeler Army Airfield), Hawaii: 13 April 1992 – 30 September 1997

=== Commanders ===
- Col Charles E. Minihan, November 1963 – 1965
- Col William H. Joyner, 30 July 1965 – 1 January 1967

=== Awards ===
| Award streamer | Award | Dates | Notes |
|---|---|---|---|
| | Air Force Outstanding Unit Award | 15 November 1963 – 15 April 1966 | 10th Aerospace Defense Squadron |
| | Air Force Outstanding Unit Award | 1 July 1966 – 1 January 1967 | 10th Aerospace Defense Squadron |
| | Air Force Outstanding Unit Award | 2 January 1967 – 1 July 1968 | 10th Aerospace Defense Group |
| | Air Force Outstanding Unit Award | 13 April 1992 – 30 June 1993 | 10th Air Defense Squadron |
| | Air Force Outstanding Unit Award | 1 October 1996 – 30 September 1997 | 10th Air Defense Squadron |

=== Missiles ===
- Thor 1962–1979
