= Colville Air Force Station =

Closed United States Air Force General Surveillance Radar station

Colville Air Force Station
- Part of Air Defense Command (ADC)

Site information
- Type: Air Force Station
- Code: ADC ID: P-60
- Controlled by: United States Air Force

Location
- Location of Colville AFS, Washington
- Coordinates: 48°35′27″N 117°35′19″W

Site history
- Built: 1950
- In use: 1950-1961

Garrison information
- Garrison: 760th Aircraft Control and Warning Squadron

Colville Air Force Station is a closed United States Air Force General Surveillance Radar station. It is located 14.7 miles (23.7 km) east-northeast of Colville, Washington. It was closed in 1961.

== History ==
Colville Air Force Station was one of twenty-eight stations built as part of the second segment of the Air Defense Command permanent radar network. Prompted by the start of the Korean War, on 11 July 1950, the Secretary of the Air Force asked the Secretary of Defense for approval to expedite construction of the permanent network. Receiving the Defense Secretary's approval on 21 July, the Air Force directed the Corps of Engineers to proceed with construction. This site took over coverage once provided by the temporary "Lashup" site L-28, Spokane, Washington, which operated between 1950-1952.

The 760th Aircraft Control and Warning Squadron (AC&W Sq) was activated at the new station on 27 November 1950. The squadron began operating an AN/TPS-1B medium-range search radar in March 1951 at the then Lashup-Permanent site LP-60, and initially the station functioned as a Ground-Control Intercept (GCI) and warning station. As a GCI station, the squadron's role was to guide interceptor aircraft toward unidentified intruders picked up on the unit's radar scopes. In November 1951 an AN/TPS-1C replaced the -B model. This radar was subsequently replaced by an AN/FPS-3 long-range search radar and an AN/FPS-5 height-finder radar at this now Permanent site (P-60) in February 1952.

In 1956 the AN/FPS-5 height-finder radar was retired and replaced by an AN/FPS-6 model. Also in 1956 an AN/GPS-3 search radar was installed. In 1958 the 760th AC&W Sq operated a newly installed AN/FPS-20 radar, and the AN/FPS-3 radar was retired. An AN/FPS-6A height-finder was added also in 1958. In 1960 the AN/FPS-20 was modified to the AN/FPS-20A model. During 1960 Colville AFS joined the Semi Automatic Ground Environment (SAGE) system, initially feeding data to DC-15 at Larson AFB, Washington. After joining, the squadron was redesignated as the 760th Radar Squadron (SAGE) on 15 July 1960. The radar squadron provided information 24/7 the SAGE Direction Center where it was analyzed to determine range, direction altitude speed and whether or not aircraft were friendly or hostile.

In addition to the main facility, Colville operated several AN/FPS-14 Gap Filler sites:

- Ione, WA (P-60A) 48°32′43″N 117°09′21″W
- Northport, WA (P-60B) 48°54′32″N 117°52′08″W
- Curlew AFS, WA (P-60C) 48°52′38″N 118°47′08″W
- Okanogan, WA (P-60D) 48°31′41″N 119°56′33″W
- Mazama, WA (P-60E) 48°44′30″N 120°40′50″W

In November 1960 this site was closed due to budget constraints. Today the site remains standing, abandoned and severely deteriorated.

== Air Force units and assignments ==
=== Units ===
- Constituted as the 760th Aircraft Control and Warning Squadron on 14 November 1950

Activated at Colville Air Force Station on 27 November 1950
Redesignated 760th Radar Squadron (SAGE) on 15 July 1960
Discontinued and inactivated on 1 June 1961

=== Assignments ===
- 505th Aircraft Control and Warning Group, 1 January 1951
- 162d Aircraft Control and Warning Group (Federalized CA ANG), 25 May 1951
- 25th Air Division, 6 February 1952
- 4702d Defense Wing, 1 January 1953
- 9th Air Division, 8 October 1954
- 25th Air Division, 15 August 1958
- 4700th Air Defense Wing, 1 September 1958
- Spokane Air Defense Sector, 15 March 1960 – 1 June 1961

== See also ==
- List of USAF Aerospace Defense Command General Surveillance Radar Stations
