= CFS Beaverlodge =

Radar station in Alberta, Canada 1953–1988

- Part of Pinetree Line CFS Beaverlodge (Alberta)

Site information
- Type: Radar Station
- Controlled by: Royal Canadian Air Force

Location
- Coordinates: 55°13′51″N 119°18′19″W

Site history
- Built: 1953
- In use: 1953-1988

Garrison information
- Garrison: Air Defence Command

Canadian Forces Station Beaverlodge (ADC ID: C-21) is a closed General Surveillance Radar station. It is located 4.9 miles (7.9 km) east-northeast of Beaverlodge, Alberta. It was closed in 1988.

It was operated as part of the Pinetree Line network controlled by NORAD.

== History ==
As a result of the Cold War and with the expansion of a North American continental air defence system, The site at Saskatoon Mountain was selected as a site for a United States Air Force (USAF) radar station, one of the many that would make up the Pinetree Line of Ground-Control Intercept (GCI) radar sites. Construction on the base began in 1952 and was completed by 1953. The base was manned by members of the USAF's Air Defense Command (ADC) 919th Aircraft Control and Warning Squadron, being known as Saskatoon Mountain Air Station.

In February 1953, operations began at the unit's permanent home. The station was equipped with AN/FPS-3C, AN/FPS-502, AN/FPS-20A; AN/TPS-502, and AN/FPS-6B radars. As a GCI base, the 915th's role was to guide interceptor aircraft toward unidentified intruders picked up on the unit's radar scopes. These interceptors were based at Larson Air Force Base in Washington.

The Ground Air Transmitting Receiving (GATR) Site for communications was located at 55°13′16″N 119°17′01″W, approximately 1,1 mile southeast from the main site. Normally the GATR site was connected by a pair of buried telephone cables, with a backup connection of dual telephone cables overhead. The Coordinate Data Transmitting Set (CDTS) (AN/FST-2) at the main site converted each radar return into a digital word which was transmitted by the GATR via microwave to the Control center.

In the early 1960s, the USAF relinquished control of the base to the Royal Canadian Air Force (RCAF). This was part of an arrangement with the United States that came as a result of the cancellation of the Avro Arrow. Canada would lease 66 F-101 Voodoo fighters and take over operation of 12 Pinetree radar bases.

Upon hand-over on 1 April 1963, the operating unit was re-designated 57 Aircraft Control & Warning Squadron and the base, RCAF Station Saskatoon Mountain. Radars at the station were also upgraded to the following equipment:

- Search Radars: AN/FPS-3C, AN/FPS-502, AN/FPS-20A
- Height Radars: AN/TPS-502, AN/FPS-6B

On 1 May 1964 radar operations at 57 Squadron were automated by the Semi Automatic Ground Environment (SAGE) system, and the station became a long-range radar site. It would no longer guide interceptors but only look for enemy aircraft, feeding data to the Spokane Air Defense Sector SAGE DC-15 Direction Center of the 25th NORAD Region at Larson AFB, Washington.

In November 1963, 57 AC&W Squadron, RCAF Station Saskatoon Mountain became 57 Radar Squadron, RCAF Station Beaverlodge. The station had a rather majestic postal address of Trumpeter, Alberta. As a result of the unification of the Canadian Forces in 1968, the new Canadian Forces organization absorbed the RCAF, RCN and the Canadian Army. 57 Radar Squadron, RCAF Station Beaverlodge, became simply Canadian Forces Station (CFS) Beaverlodge in 1966.

Also in 1966, the facilities at Larson AFB were closed, and control of the station was switched to the SAGE Direction Center at McChord AFB, Washington (DC-12).

The station was administratively accountable to Canadian Forces Air Defence Command, and its successor Fighter Group. In August 1984, Beaverlodge became part of the Canada West ROCC. The station carried on its assigned duties until operations ceased on 1 April 1988. Today, the facilities of the radar station have been removed, and the land is now a cleared grassy site with little or no evidence of its military past.

== See also ==
- List of Royal Canadian Air Force stations
- List of USAF Aerospace Defense Command General Surveillance Radar Stations
