= Program 437 =

Anti-satellite weapons program of the U.S. military

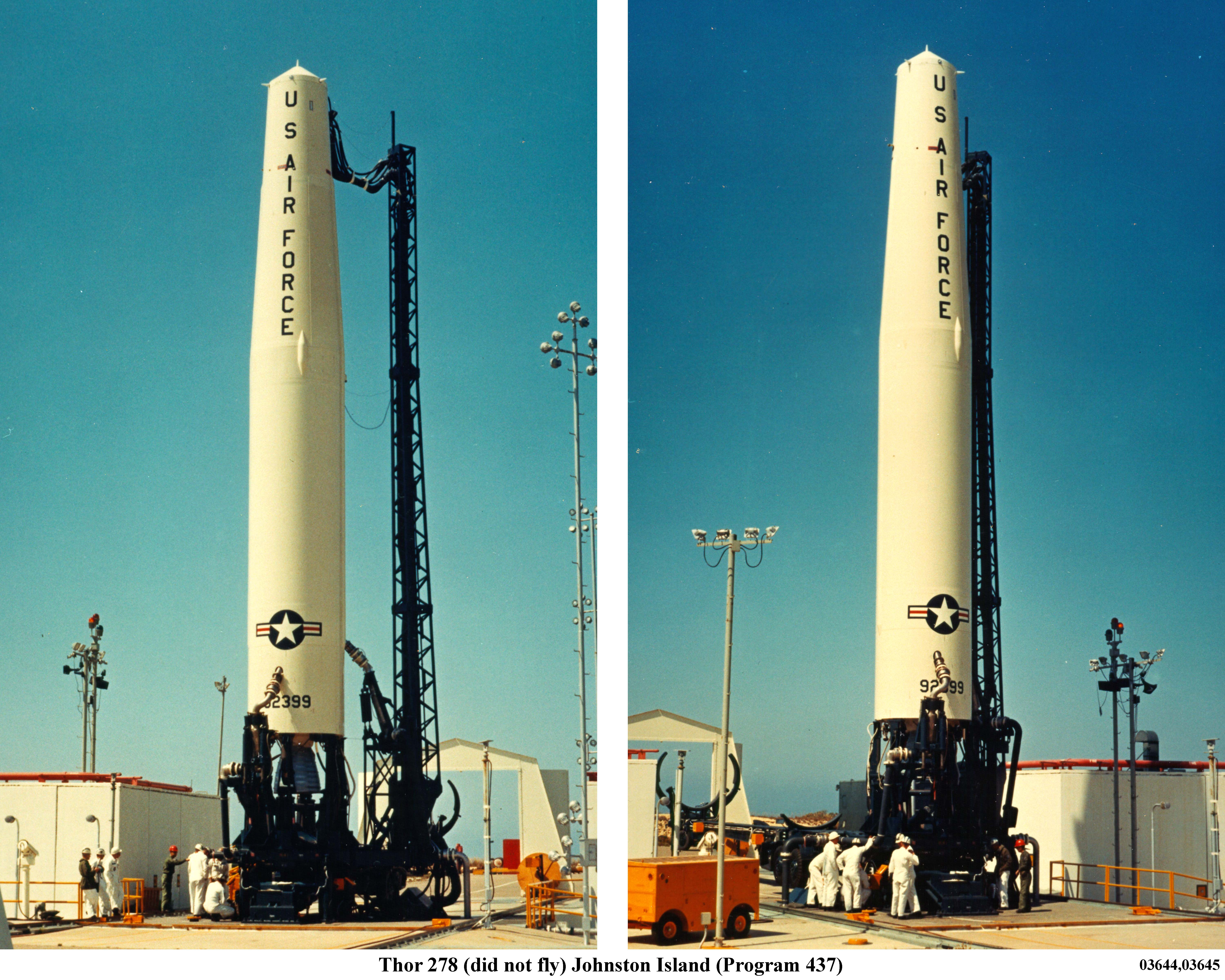
Thor 278 missile, Johnston Island, Program 437

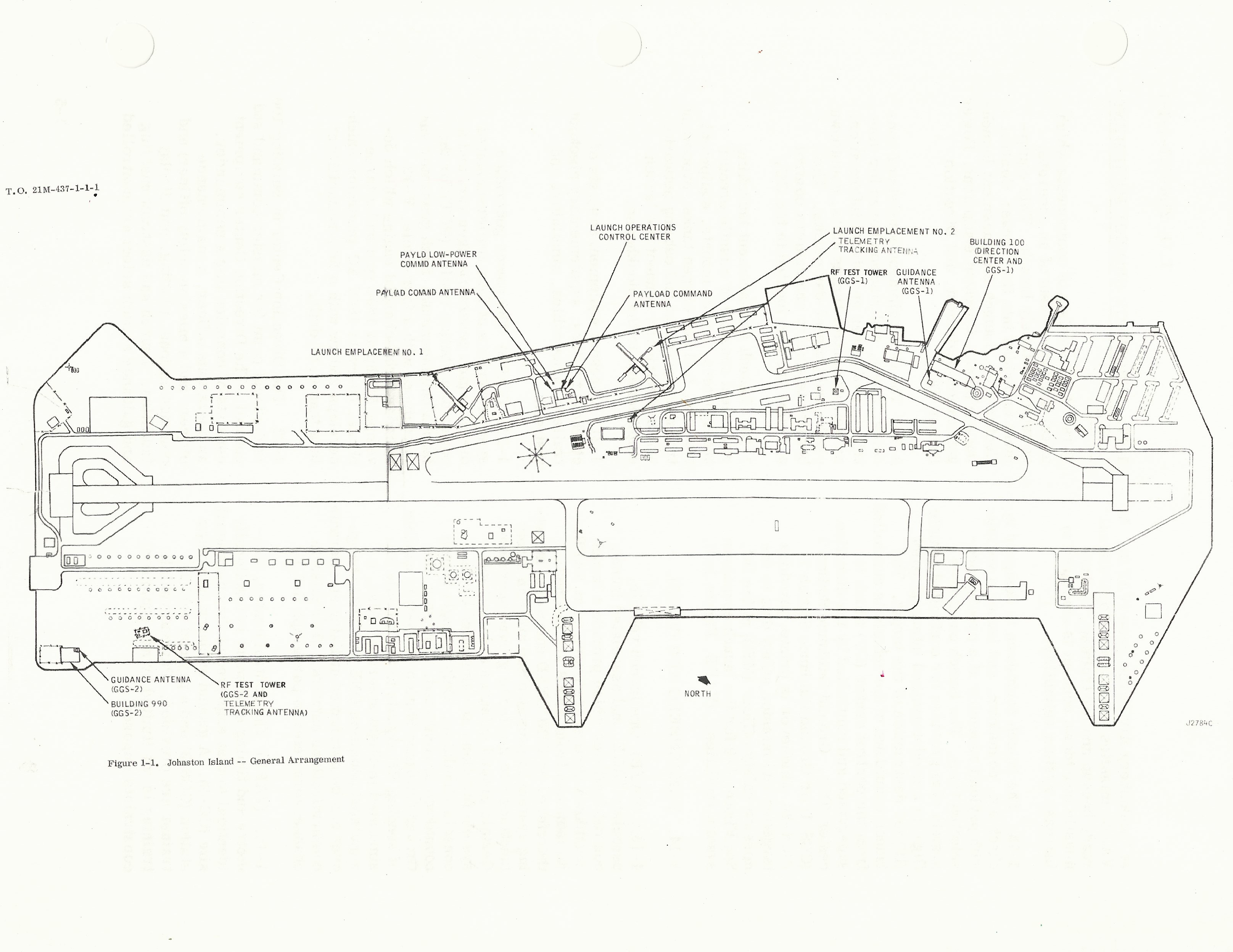
Program 437 layout on Johnston Island

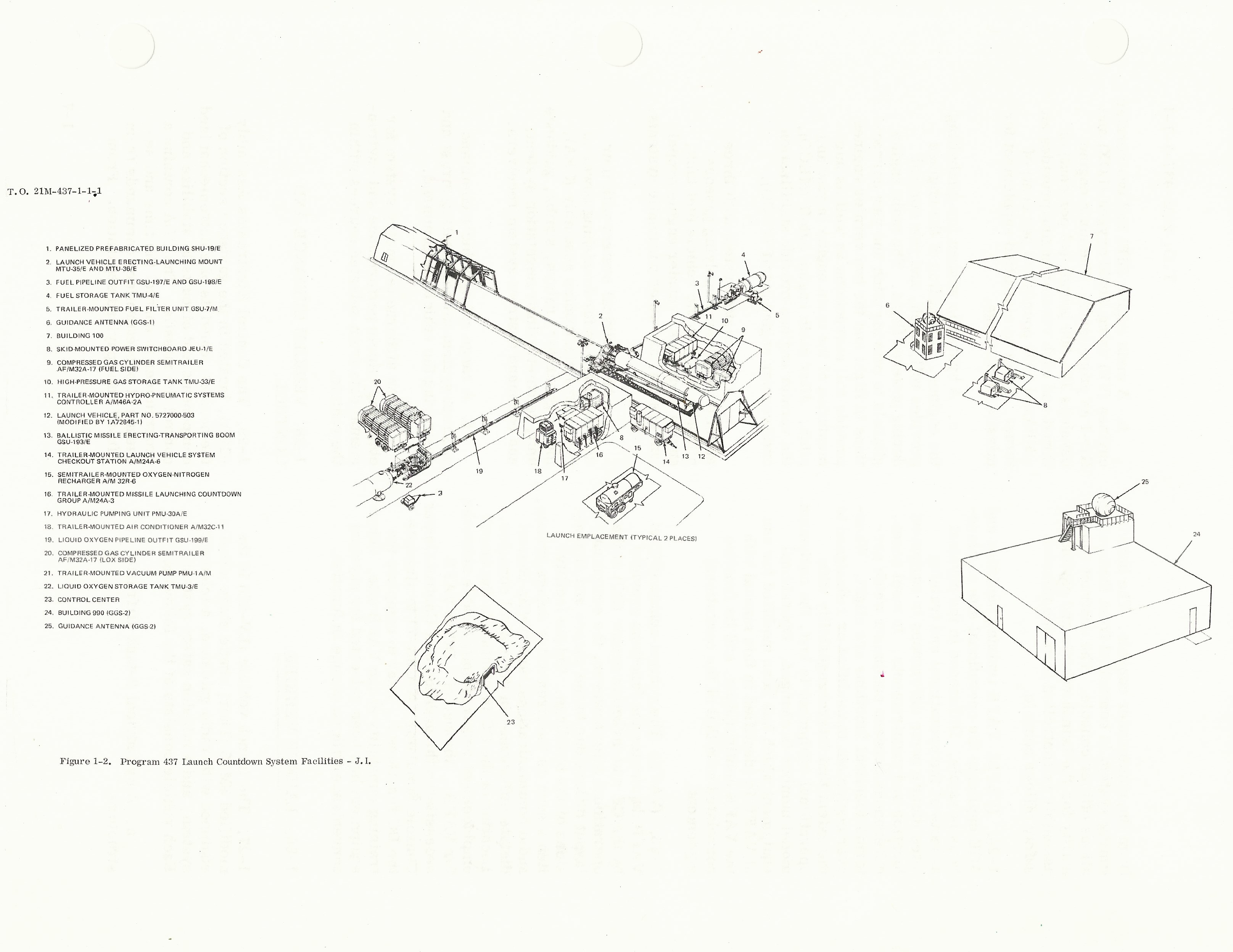
Program 437 Launch Site Layout

Program 437 was the second anti-satellite weapons program of the U.S. military. The US anti-satellite weapons program began development in the early 1960s and was officially discontinued on 1 April 1975. Program 437 was approved for development by U.S. Secretary of Defense Robert McNamara on November 20, 1962, after a series of tests involving high altitude nuclear explosions. The program's facilities were located on Johnston Island, an isolated island in the north central Pacific Ocean.

== History ==
The US's first anti-satellite system was Program 505, based at the Kwajalein Missile Range, about halfway between Hawaii and the Philippine islands. This system became operational in 1962, based on the Nike Zeus anti-ballistic missile that had been tested at that site. These missiles had been modified for greater range, but even with these modifications the system could only intercept satellites that flew very close to the base, with a maximum altitude around 150 nautical miles (280 km; 170 mi). A system with longer range was an obvious requirement.

Program 437 was based on the much more powerful PGM-17 Thor ballistic missile. It used Thor DSV-2E missiles armed with a W49 or W50 nuclear weapon, which would destroy or disable targets through nuclear explosion or the resulting electromagnetic pulse. Eight Thor DSV-2E missiles were launched between May 2, 1962, and November 1, 1962. Though the program would routinely run successful tests with unarmed Thor missiles, the only high altitude nuclear explosions were conducted through Operations Argus, Hardtack I, and Dominic/Fishbowl between 1958 and 1962. Operation Argus operated out of the South Atlantic, while Hardtack and Dominic conducted their high altitude tests from the Johnston Island facilities. "Tightrope" was part of "Fishbowl" but was a lower altitude detonation.

Some results of these tests, Dominic's 1962 Starfish Prime test in particular, presented concerns throughout the program's existence. In addition to the widespread effects of the nuclear explosion's electromagnetic pulse, which inadvertently damaged many satellites as well as land based electronics as far as 1,500 kilometres (930 mi) away, a large amount of charged particle radiation was released by the nuclear explosion. This radiation became trapped by the Earth's magnetic field, creating artificial belts of radiation 100 to 1,000 times stronger than background levels. The heightened levels of radiation eventually crippled one-third of all satellites in low orbit, while rendering seven others completely useless, including the first commercial communication satellite ever, Telstar.

It was eventually concluded that the due to the wide radius of damage, wartime deployment of Program 437 would result in indiscriminate destruction of friendly and enemy satellites, potentially destabilizing or escalating otherwise non-nuclear conflicts. In addition to these problems, the Soviets deployed numerous military satellites, making specific targeting impractical or ineffective. Furthermore, the United States Air Force had a limited supply of Thor missiles, and all military resources (especially financial) had become increasingly strained with the US involvement in the Vietnam War.

In October 1970, the Department of Defense transferred Program 437 to standby status as an economic measure. Test launches were no longer run, and the weapons system would take fourteen to thirty days to intercept targets, requiring components stored at Vandenberg Air Force Base to be airlifted by a C-124 Globemaster II to Johnston Island for deployment. These obstacles further degraded the weapon's suitability and effectiveness for war.

Part of Program 437 was 437 Alternate Payload (AP) which was used for satellite inspection. Thor DSV-2J missiles were used for the 437 Alternate Payload program. Eighteen DSV-2J Thors were launched from the Atoll between February 14, 1964, and November 6, 1975.

=== Demise ===
On 19 August 1972, Hurricane Celeste destroyed most of the facilities and guidance computers at Johnston. Though the systems were able to be restored by September 1972, unspecified damage caused them to fail on 8 December. The program became fully repaired and restored by 29 March 1973, and remained in standby status until the anti-satellite mission on the Johnston Island facilities were ceased on 10 August 1974. Program 437 was officially terminated on 6 March 1975 at the request of NORAD, and on 1 April 1975 the Department of Defense terminated funding for any anti-satellite programs or development. In January 1977, at the end of his term of office, then President Gerald Ford issued a directive for the DoD to again enter research and development on an operational anti-satellite program. It was an order his successor, President Jimmy Carter, followed through on, and anti-satellite technology has continued to be in some form of research or development since.

== Operations ==
Two missiles were kept on alert at Johnston Island, and two were kept in war reserve at Vandenberg AFB, California.

Program 437 Thors could intercept low Earth orbiting satellites up to an altitude of 700 nautical miles (1,300 km) and a cross-range distance of 1,500 nautical miles (2,800 km). Two missiles were readied for launch, one as primary launcher and the other as a hot back-up in case of primary failure. Launch windows were as small as one second, also necessitating the dual missiles. Once the missile's trajectory hit the target's orbital path, the one megaton Mark 49 warhead would explode, setting off a blast radius of five miles (8.0 km).

== Chronology ==
- 1964
  - 28 May - first Combat Training Launch (CTL)
  - 29 May - Program 437 declared Initial Operating Capability (IOC)
  - 10 Jun - Program 437 declared Full Operating Capability (IOC)
  - 20 Sep - President Lyndon Johnson reveals existence of Nike-Zeus and Program 437 anti-satellite weapons during campaign speech
- 1965
  - 7 Dec - first 437AP launch
- 1966
  - 18 Jan - second 437AP launch (successful)
  - 12 Mar - third 437AP launch (successful)
  - Late 1966 - Air Defense Command and Air Force Systems Command plan for ten 437AP launches, under Program STONE MARTEN
  - 30 Nov - Program 437AP is formally cancelled by Headquarters USAF
- 1967
  - 31 Mar - CTL conducted
- 1968
  - 14 May - CTL conducted
  - 20 Nov - CTL conducted
- 1970
  - 27 Mar - Final Program 437 CTL launched
  - 4 May - Deputy Defense Secretary David Packard directs the Air Force to accelerate the phase down of Program 437 to standby status by end of fiscal year.
- 1972
  - 19 Aug - Hurricane Celeste hits Johnston Island, damaging Program 437 launch facilities and computers
- 1975
  - 1 Apr - Department of Defense officially terminates Program 437

== Photo gallery ==
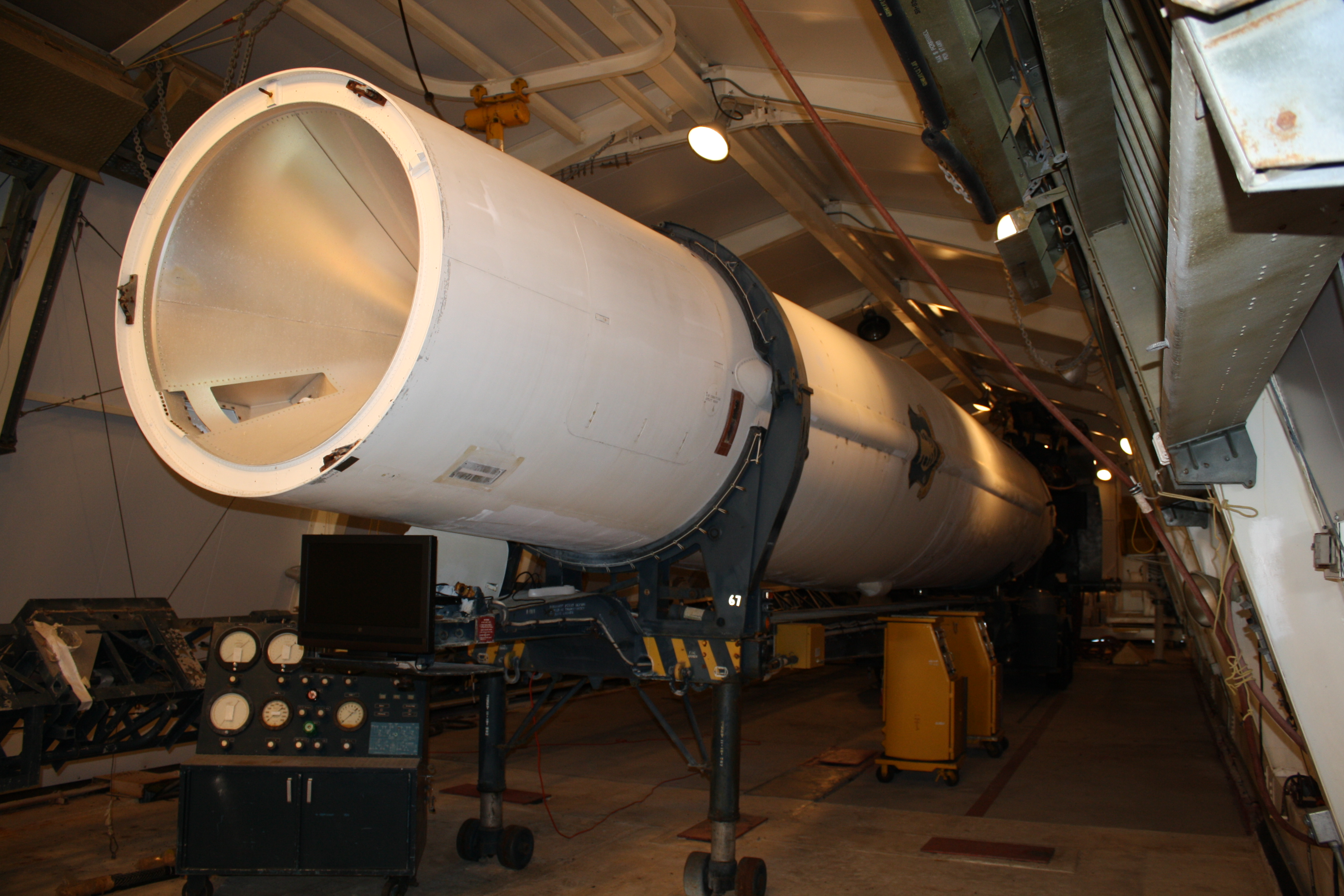
Program 437 Thor at SLC-10W

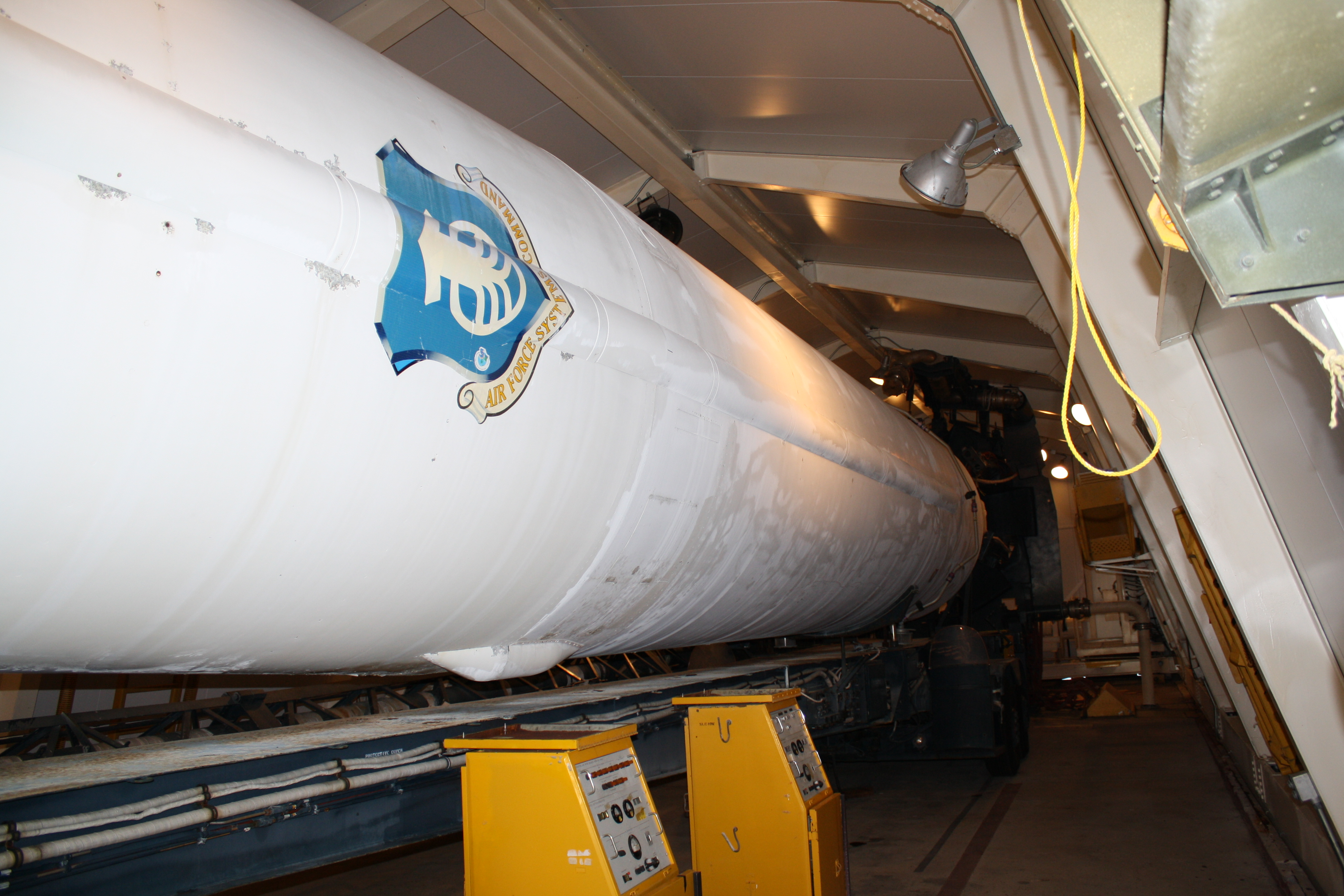
Program 437 Thor at SLC-10W

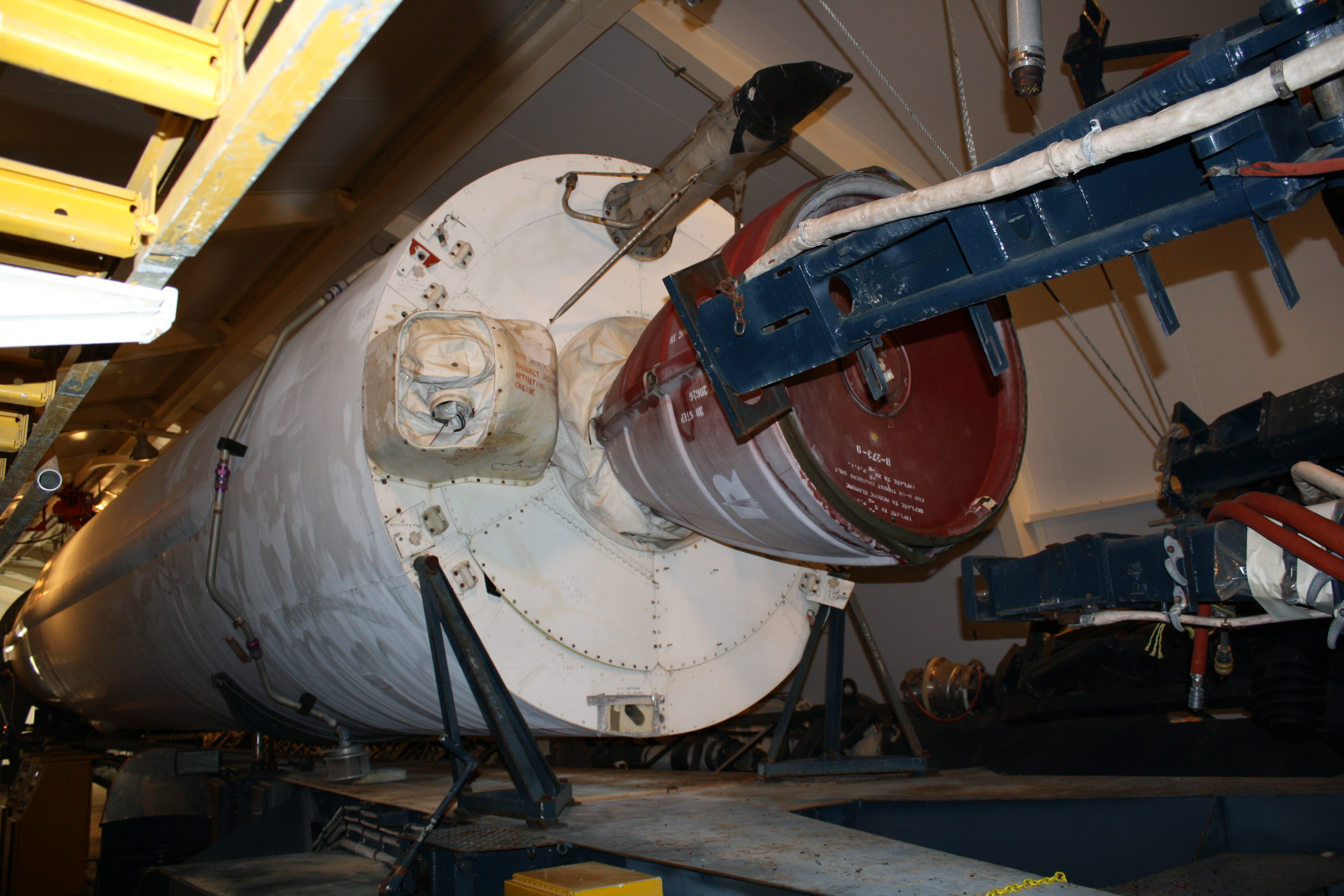
Program 437 Thor at SLC-10W

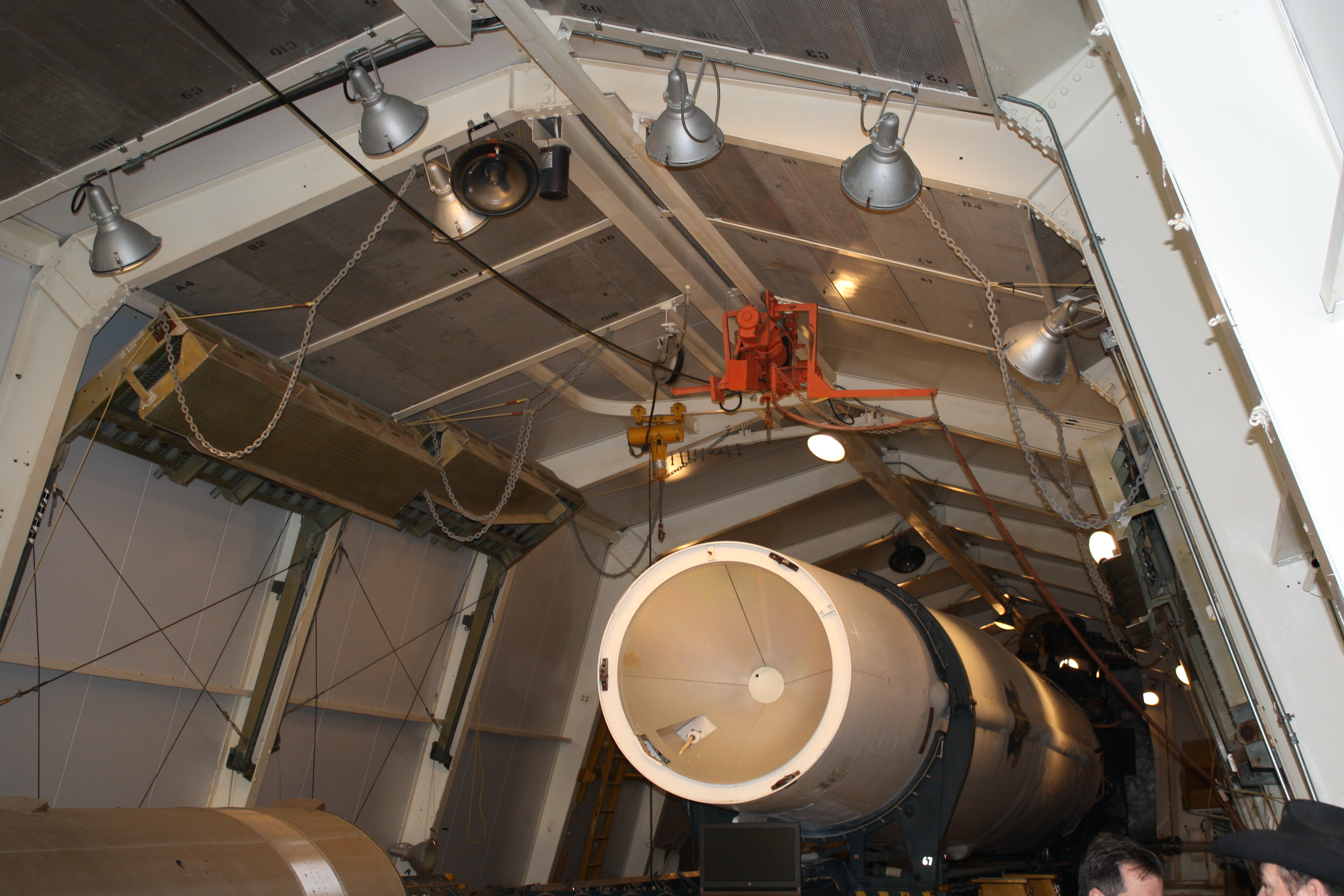
Program 437 Thor at SLC-10W

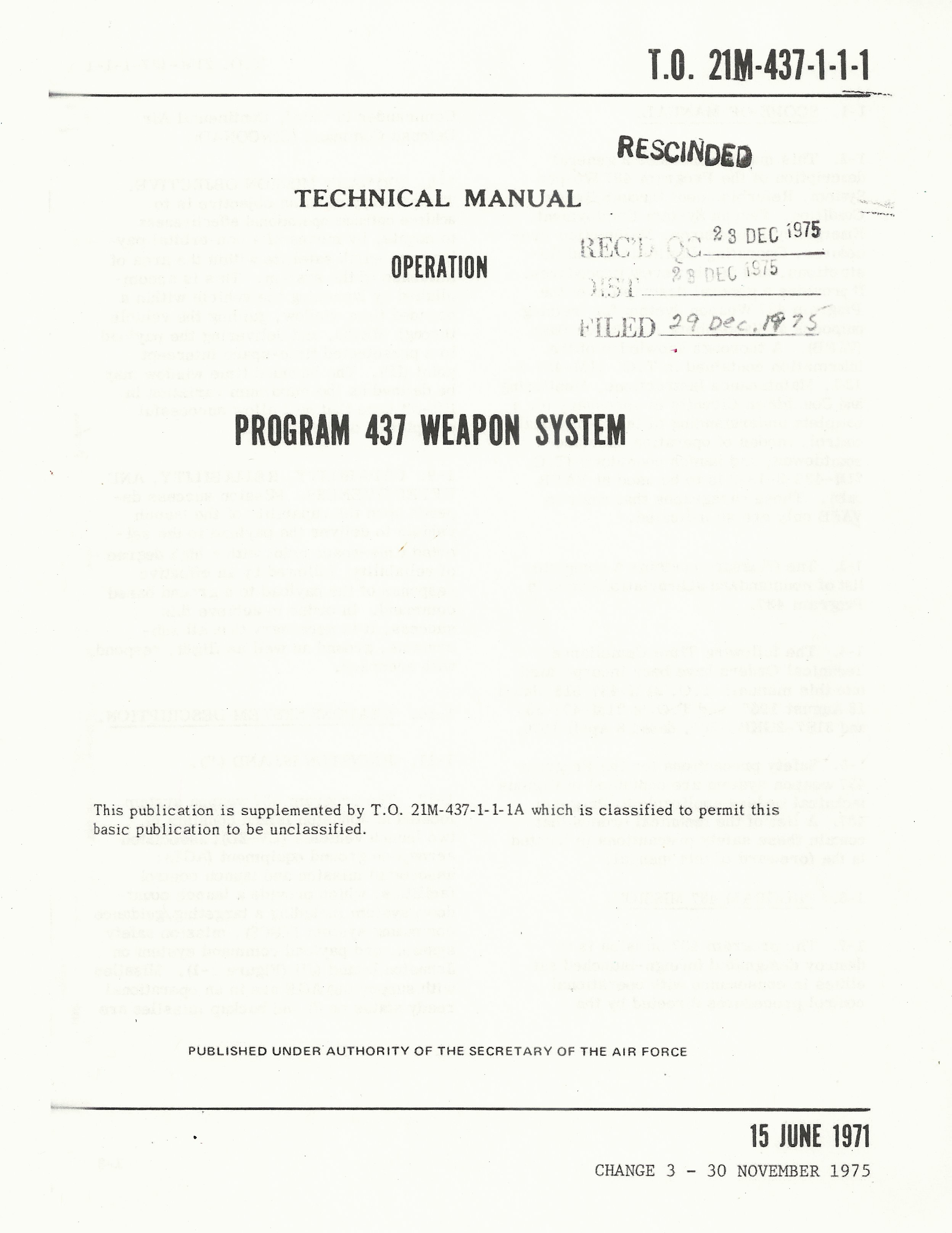
Program 437 Technical Order ("Dash-1") cover

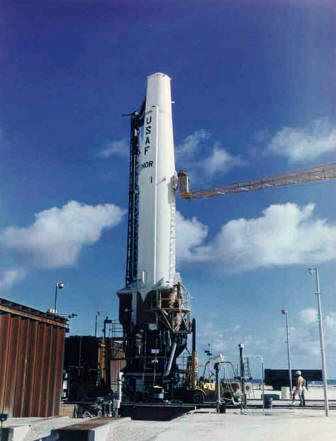
PGM-17 Thor missile at Johnston Island

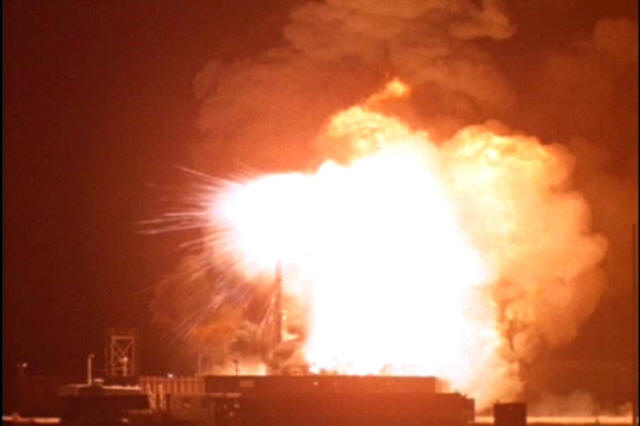
Thor missile launch failure and explosion contaminates Johnston Island with Plutonium during the Operation "Bluegill Prime" nuclear test, July 25, 1962

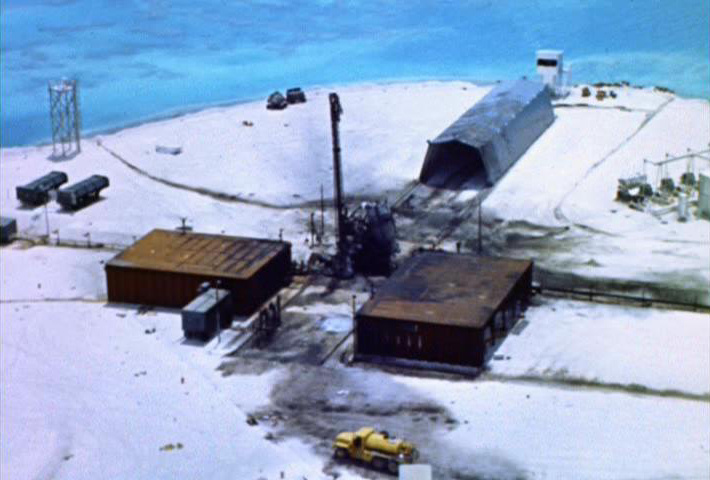
Johnston Island Launch Emplacement 1, contaminated during Thor missile launch failure, Operation Bluegill Prime, July 25, 1962.

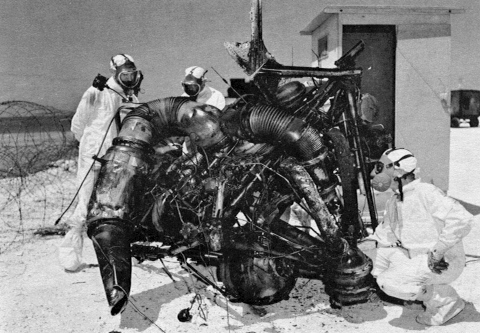
Inspection of Thor rocket engine remains after failure of Bluegill Prime nuclear test attempt on 25 July 1962.

== See also ==
- 10th Aerospace Defense Squadron and 10th Aerospace Defense Group - operators of Program 437
- Fractional Orbital Bombardment System – the Soviet orbital nuclear missile system, deployed operationally 1969–1983
- Nuclear weapon delivery systems
- Outer Space Treaty

== Notes ==
- Chun, Clayton K. S. (1999). Shooting down a star: the US Thor Program 437, nuclear ASAT, and copycat killers. Air University Press. ISBN 1-58566-071-X. Archived from the original on September 19, 2016.
- "Operation DOMINIC I" (PDF). Defense Threat Reduction Agency Department of Public Affairs. September 2021.
- "Operation Hardtack". United States Army. Archived from the original on 5 November 2010.
- Muolo, Major Michael J.; Hand, Major Richard A. (December 1993). Space Handbook: A War Fighter's Guide to Space. Vol. One. Air University Air Command and Staff College. Archived from the original on 24 September 2008.
