= Cottonwood Air Force Station =

Former US Air Force radar station in Idaho

Cottonwood Air Force Station
- Part of Air Defense Command (ADC)
- Cottonwood Butte, Idaho County, Idaho, United States
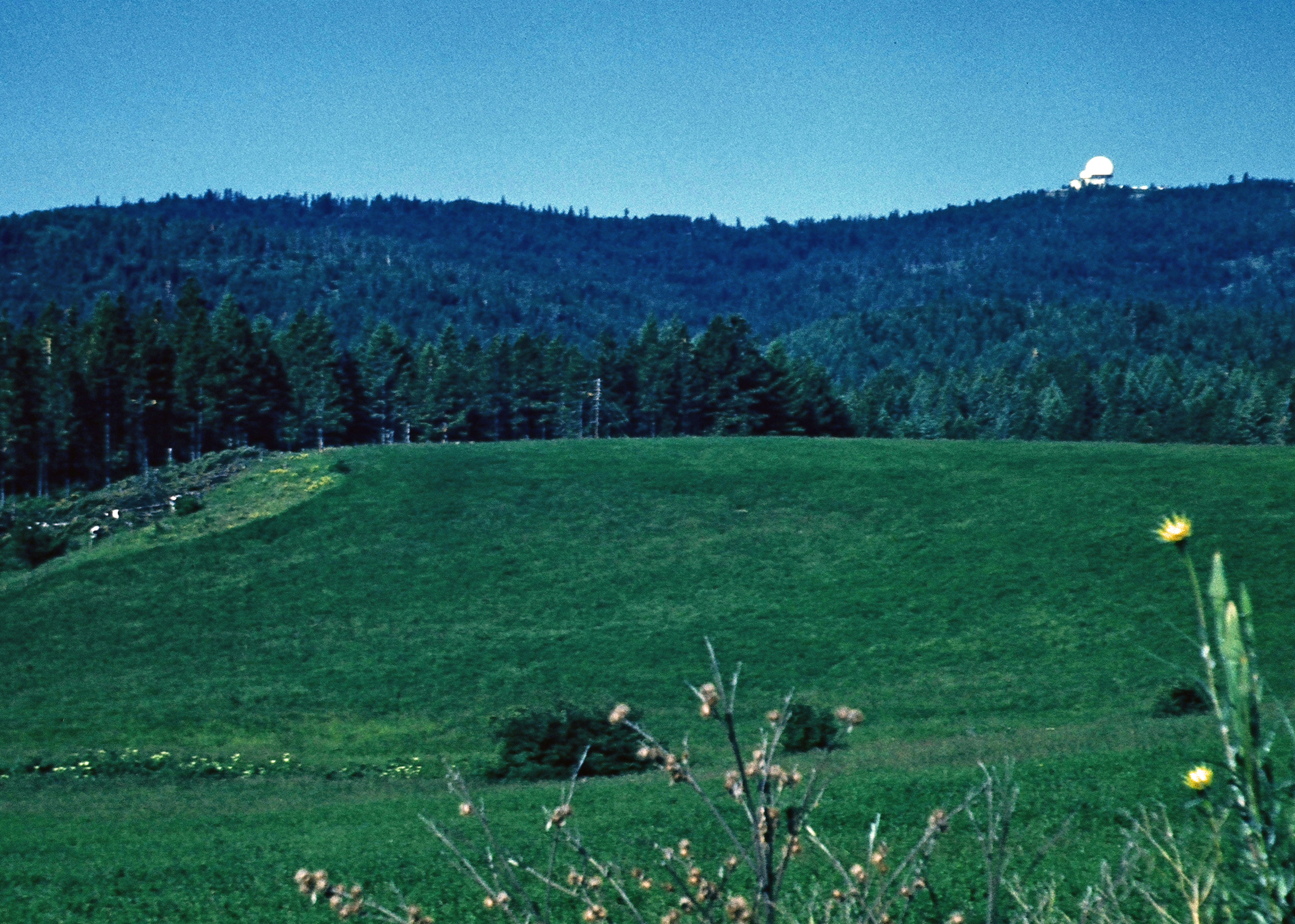
- Cottonwood AFS, c. 1964, with large FPS-24 radome dwarfing FPS-6 radome alongside.

Site information
- Type: Air Force Station
- Code: ADC ID: SM-150
- Owner: State of Idaho (1974-present)
- Controlled by: United States Air Force
- Condition: Closed; now a minimum-security state correctional facility

Location
- Location of Cottonwood AFS, Idaho
- Coordinates: 46°04′01″N 116°27′51″W

Site history
- Built: 1955-1958
- In use: 1958-1965
- Events: Cold War

Garrison information
- Garrison: 822d Aircraft Control and Warning Squadron
- Occupants: 135

Cottonwood Air Force Station is a former United States Air Force General Surveillance Radar station. The radar site was located at the summit of Cottonwood Butte, 5.7 miles (9.2 km) west-northwest of Cottonwood in Idaho County, Idaho. It was closed in 1965 and transferred to the state of Idaho in 1974, when it was converted to its present use as a minimum-security correctional facility.

Cottonwood Peak Air Force Station was initially part of Phase II of the Air Defense Command Mobile Radar program. The Air Force approved this expansion of the Mobile Radar program on 23 October 1952. Radars in this network were designated "SM."

== History ==
The station became operational on 1 July 1958 when the 822d Aircraft Control and Warning Squadron (AC&W Sq) was assigned to the new station. The station consisted of 66 buildings, including operation and administrative facilities, 3 dormitories, 27 family housing units, 3 radar domes, and the normal support facilities/utilities. The site was divided into three general areas: the operations area at the summit, cantonment area at mid-mountain, and a family housing area at the north end of the city of Cottonwood. The 822d AC&W Sq operated used AN/MPS-7, AN/MPS-14, and AN/FPS-6 radars, and initially the station functioned as a Ground-Control Intercept (GCI) and warning station. As a GCI station, the squadron's role was to guide interceptor aircraft toward unidentified intruders picked up on the unit's radar scopes.

During 1960 Cottonwood AFS joined the Semi Automatic Ground Environment (SAGE) system, feeding data to DC-07 at Larson AFB, Washington. After joining, the squadron was redesignated as the 822d Radar Squadron (SAGE) on 1 September 1960. The radar squadron provided information 24/7 the SAGE Direction Center where it was analyzed to determine range, direction altitude speed and whether or not aircraft were friendly or hostile. In 1962 the 822d began operating an AN/FPS-24 search radar and an additional AN/FPS-6B radar, as the AN/MPS-7 and AN/MPS-14 units were retired. In 1964 the AN/FPS-6B was upgraded to an AN/FPS-90 and Cottonwood AFS was shifted to feeding data to the SAGE Data center DC-12 at McChord AFB.

In addition to the main facility, Cottonwood operated an AN/FPS-14 Gap Filler site:

- Waha, ID (SM-150A) 46°17′30″N 116°53′01″W

The closure of the base was announced in November 1964. A catastrophic bearing failure in the AN/FPS-24 antenna pedestal led to an early shutdown of the station and the inactivation of the 822d Radar Squadron on 25 June 1965 (only two or three years after the AN/FPS-24 radome was installed over the antenna) as part of fiscal year 1965 cutbacks.

The Cantonment Area was used from 1965 to 1974 by the Office of Economic Opportunity as a Job Corps Center. The State of Idaho Dept. of Corrections acquired the property in 1974, and has occupied the site ever since as North Idaho Correctional Institution. This is a program-specific prison designed for male offenders sentenced to a retained jurisdiction commitment by the court. It provides a sentencing alternative for the courts to target those offenders who might, after a period of programming and evaluation, be viable candidates for probation rather than incarceration.

Today most of the radar site on the mountain summit is torn down. The AN/FPS-24 tower still stands but little else, as only building foundations and deteriorated streets remain.

== Air Force units and assignments ==
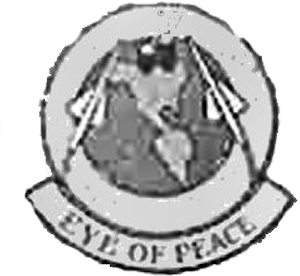
Emblem of the 822d Radar Squadron

=== Units ===
- Constituted as the 822d Aircraft Control and Warning Squadron

Activated at Geiger Field, Washington on 1 February 1957
Moved to Cottonwood AFS on 1 July 1958
Redesignated as the 822d Radar Squadron (SAGE), 1 September 1960
Discontinued and inactivated on 25 June 1965

=== Assignments ===
- 9th Air Division, 1 July 1958
- 25th Air Division, 15 August 1958
- 4700th Air Defense Wing, 1 September 1958
- Spokane Air Defense Sector, 15 March 1960
- Seattle Air Defense Sector, 1 June 1963 – 25 June 1965

== See also ==
- List of USAF Aerospace Defense Command General Surveillance Radar Stations
