= Spokane Air Defense Sector =

Spokane Air Defense Sector

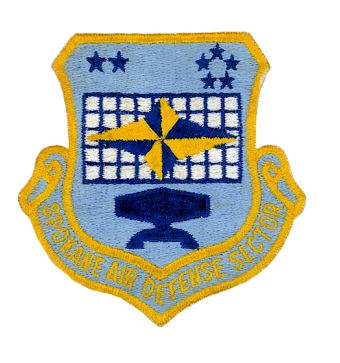
- Emblem of the Spokane Air Defense Sector
- Active: 1958–1963
- Country: United States
- Branch: United States Air Force
- Type: Fighter Interceptor and Radar
- Role: Air Defense
- Part of: Air Defense Command

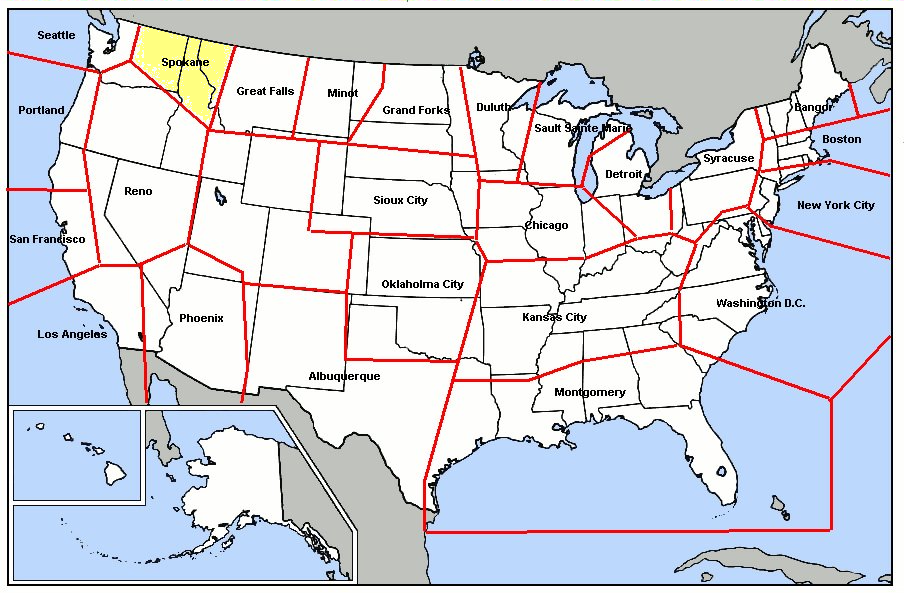
Map of Spokane ADS

The Spokane Air Defense Sector (SPADS) is an inactive United States Air Force organization. Its last assignment was with the Air Defense Command 25th Air Division (25th AD) at Larson Air Force Base in Grant County, Washington

== History ==
=== SAGE Air Defense Sector ===
SPADS was established in September 1958, assuming responsibility for air defense in Eastern Washington, North Idaho, and Western Montana. The organization eventually also provided command and control over several interceptor aircraft and radar squadrons.

On 8 September the new Semi Automatic Ground Environment (SAGE) Direction Center (DC-15) became operational. 47°10′53″N 119°19′16″W DC-15 was equipped with dual AN/FSQ-7 Computers. The day-to-day operations of the command was to train and maintain tactical flying units flying jet interceptor aircraft (F-94 Starfire; F-102 Delta Dagger; F-106 Delta Dart) in a state of readiness with training missions and series of exercises with SAC and other units simulating interceptions of incoming enemy aircraft. However, until March 1960, SPADS did not have operational command over the radar and interceptor aircraft it directed. Instead, they were assigned to the 4700th Air Defense Wing until March 1960. The 4700th was transferred from direct assignment to 25th AD to SPADS briefly before being discontinued in July.

The Sector was inactivated on 1 September 1963 and its units were assigned to the 25th AD.

=== 4700th Air Defense Wing ===
The Sector's only wing was designated and organized as 4700th Air Defense Wing at Geiger Field Washington to provide air defense of the northwestern United States on 1 September 1958. It was assigned two fighter groups flying fighter interceptor aircraft (F-102 Delta Dagger, F-104 Starfighter, and F-106 Delta Dart) and ten radar squadrons to accomplish its mission. When its 498th Fighter-Interceptor Squadron (part of the 84th Fighter Group) converted to F-106As, it became the first combat ready squadron flying Delta Darts. In May 1959, the wing's 4721st Air Defense Group at Larson was discontinued and its 538th Fighter-Interceptor Squadron transferred directly to the wing

On 15 March 1960, the wing's 636th, 637th, 822d and 823d Aircraft Control and Warning Squadrons and 538th Fighter-Interceptor Squadron were transferred to SPADS. Other radar units assigned to the wing, however, were transferred to other ADC organizations. The 634th Aircraft Control and Warning Squadron at Burns AFS, Oregon, in May 1960; the 638th Aircraft Control and Warning Squadron at Curlew AFS, Washington in December 1959, the 680th Aircraft Control and Warning Squadron at Yaak AFS, Montana in July 1960; the 716th Aircraft Control and Warning Squadron at Geiger Field, Washington in May 1959 and the 821st Aircraft Control and Warning Squadron at Baker AFS, Oregon in May 1960.

In May, the wing and its 84th Fighter Group were also transferred, leaving the wing without an operational mission, and it was discontinued on 30 June 1960.

== Lineage ==
- Established as Spokane Air Defense Sector on 8 September 1958

Inactivated on 1 September 1963

=== Assignments ===
- 25th Air Division, 8 September 1958 – 1 September 1963

=== Stations ===
- Larson AFB, Washington, 8 September 1958 – 1 September 1963

=== Components ===
==== Wing ====
- 4700th Air Defense Wing

Geiger Field, Washington, 15 May 1960 – 1 July 1960

==== Group ====
- 84th Fighter Group (Air Defense)

Geiger Field, Washington, 1 July 1960 – 15 July 1963

==== Interceptor squadron ====
- 538th Fighter-Interceptor Squadron

Larson AFB, Washington, 15 May 1960 – 1 July 1960

==== Radar squadrons ====
- 636th Radar Squadron

Condon AFS, Oregon, 15 March 1960 – 1 June 1963

- 637th Radar Squadron

Othello AFS, Washington, 15 March 1960 – 1 June 1963

- 760th Radar Squadron

Colville AFS, Washington, 15 March 1960 – 1 June 1961

- 822d Radar Squadron

Cottonwood AFS, Idaho, 1 June 1963 – 25 June 1965

* 823d Radar Squadron

Mica Peak AFS, Washington, 15 March 1960 – 1 June 1963

- 825th Aircraft Control and Warning Squadron

Kamloops AS, British Columbia, 15 March 1960 – 1 April 1962

- 919th Aircraft Control and Warning Squadron

Saskatoon Mountain AS, Alberta, 15 March 1960 – 1 April 1963

== See also ==
- List of USAF Aerospace Defense Command General Surveillance Radar Stations
- Aerospace Defense Command Fighter Squadrons
- List of MAJCOM wings of the United States Air Force
- List of United States Air Force aircraft control and warning squadrons
