= F-89 Scorpion units of the United States Air Force =

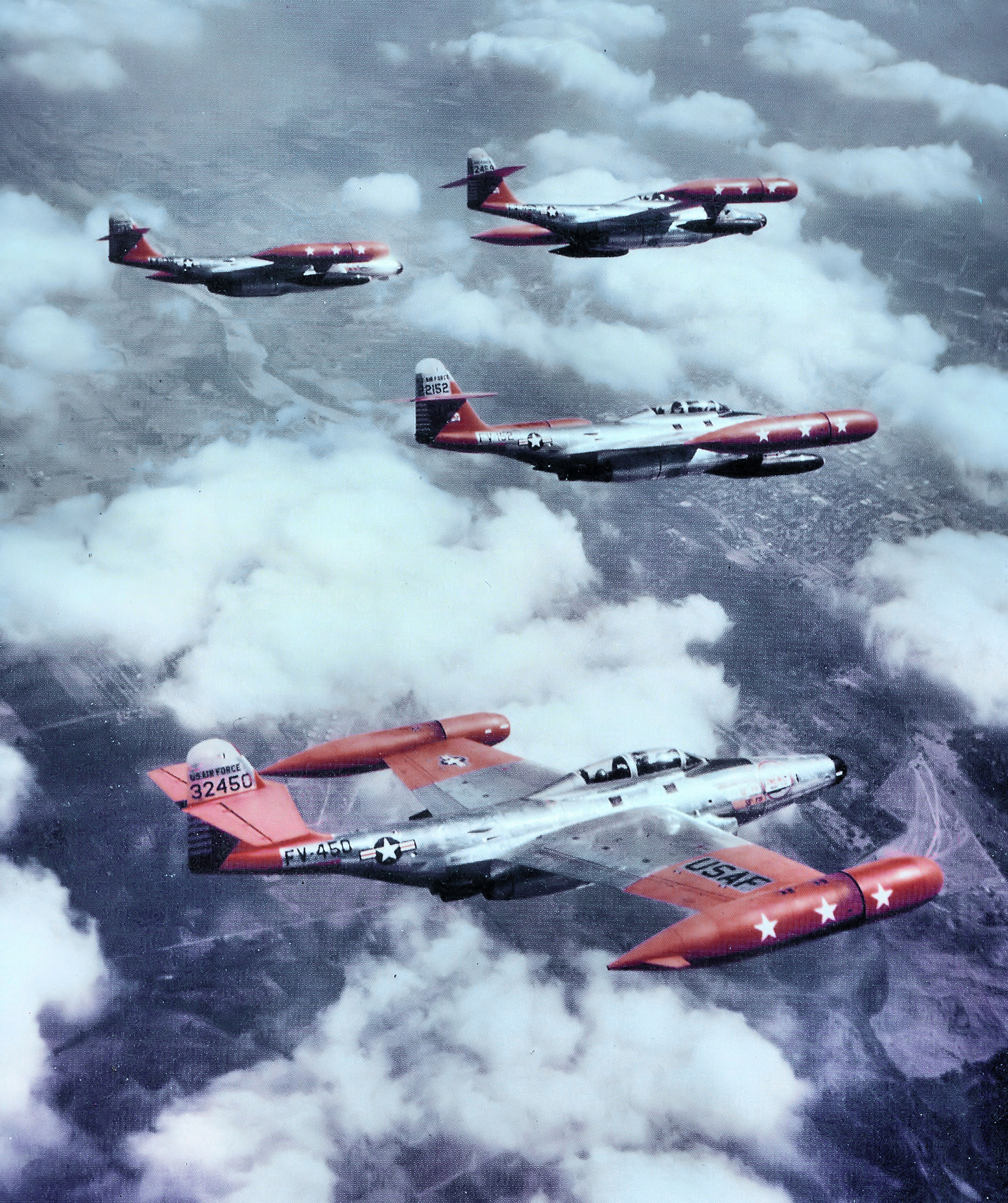
59th Fighter-Interceptor Squadron Northrop F-89D Scorpions in formation

The Northrop F-89 Scorpion was a subsonic second-generation jet interceptor of the United States Air Force. After a long development during the postwar era of the late 1940s, it began reaching operational units in the early 1950s. A stablemate of the North American F-86D Sabre Interceptor, the F-89 replaced the first-generation Lockheed F-94 Starfire interceptor, primarily in the Air Defense Command (ADC). It was phased out of active service in the late 1950s, being replaced by supersonic McDonnell F-101B Voodoos and Convair F-102A Delta Dagger interceptors.

== Models and service life ==
- F-89B Scorpion, First production model, 40 produced; first assigned to the 84th Fighter-Interceptor Squadron, Hamilton AFB, California in June 1951. All transferred to Air National Guard by the end of 1954.
- F-89C Scorpion, Second production model, 164 produced. First assigned to the 74th Fighter-Interceptor Squadron, Presque Isle AFB, Maine in January 1952. All transferred to Air National Guard by the end of 1954.
- F-89D Scorpion, Third (and major) production model, 682 produced. First assigned to the 18th Fighter-Interceptor Squadron, Ladd AFB, Alaska in January 1954. All transferred to Air National Guard by the end of 1961.
- F-89H Scorpion, Fourth (and last) production model; adaptation of the missile-armed F-89D to carry the new AIM-4 Falcon air-to-air missile, 156 produced. First assigned to the 445th Fighter-Interceptor Squadron, Wurtsmith AFB, Michigan in March 1956. All transferred to Air National Guard by September 1959.
- F-89J Scorpion, F-89Ds modified to carry Douglas MB-1 (later AIR-2) Genie nuclear-tipped unguided air-to-air rocket, 350 modified. First assigned to the 54th Fighter-Interceptor Squadron, Ellsowrth AFB, South Dakota in July 1957

The last active-duty USAF F-89J was transferred to Air National Guard service by the 57th Fighter-Interceptor Squadron at Keflavik Airport, Iceland in July, 1962.

The Wisconsin Air National Guard 176th Fighter-Interceptor Squadron was federalized during the Korean War, receiving F-89Cs in February 1952-while on active duty. It was returned to state control in November 1952. Two squadrons of the Wisconsin Air National Guard, the 126th Fighter-Interceptor Squadron at General Mitchell Field, Milwaukee and the 176th Fighter-Interceptor Squadron at Truax Field, Madison were the first ANG units to be equipped with a mixture of F-89B/Cs in September 1954.

The Northrop F-89 Scorpion reached the end of the line of US military service in July 1969 when the Iowa Air National Guard 124th Fighter-Interceptor Squadron retired its last F-89Js.

== Squadrons ==
Active-Duty USAF operational squadrons
Squadron	Unit	Model	Service	Notes/Subsequent History
11th Fighter-Interceptor Squadron	515th Air Defense Group	F-89D	Apr 1955-Aug 1956	Duluth International Airport, MN; Converted to F-102 Delta Dagger
15th Fighter-Interceptor Squadron	34th Air Division	F-89J	Apr 1959-Apr 1960	Davis Monthan Air Force Base, AZ; Converted to F-101B Voodoo
18th Fighter-Interceptor Squadron	514th Air Defense Group	F-89D	Jan 1954-Jun 1957	Alaskan Air Command; Ladd Air Force Base, AK; Converted to F-102 Delta Dagger
29th Fighter-Interceptor Squadron	29th Air Division	F-89H; F-89J	May 1957-Jun 1960	Malmstrom Air Force Base, MT, F-89J April 1958; Converted to F-101B Voodoo June 1960
49th Fighter-Interceptor Squadron	4727th Air Defense Group; Syracuse Air Defense Sector	F-89J	Aug 1959-Dec 1959	Griffiss Air Force Base, NY, Acquired F-89Js by swapping F-86L Sabres with 465th FIS; Converted to F-101B/F Voodoo
54th Fighter-Interceptor Squadron	29th Air Division	F-89J	Jul 1957-Dec 1960	Ellsworth Air Force Base, SD, Squadron inactivated 25 December 1960
57th Fighter-Interceptor Squadron	528th Air Defense Group; Iceland Air Defense Force; 1400th Operations Group	F-89C; F-89D; F-89J	Apr 1953-Jul 1962	Presque Isle Air Force Base, ME; to Military Air Transport Service (MATS): Keflavik Airport, Iceland; To F-89D Aug 1953; F-89J Aug 1954; Last active-duty F-89 Squadron; Converted to F-102A Delta Dagger
58th Fighter-Interceptor Squadron	33d Fighter Group; 4735th Air Defense Group	F-89D; F-89H; F-89J	Apr 1955-Aug 1959	Otis Air Force Base, MA, F-89H 1956, F-89J 1957; Squadron inactivated 25 December 1960
59th Fighter-Interceptor Squadron	64th Air Division; 4732d Air Defense Group	F-89D; F-89J	Dec 1954-Apr 1960	Goose Air Force Base, Labrador; transferred from Northeast Air Command (NEAC) with F-89Ds 1 April 1957 and converted to F-89J; converted to F-102A Delta Dagger
61st Fighter-Interceptor Squadron	64th Air Division; 4731st Air Defense Group	F-89C; F-89D	Jun 1954-Nov 1957	Ernest Harmon Air Force Base, Labrador; transferred from NEAC with F-89Ds 1 April 1957; F-89D received Jan 1955; converted to F-102A Delta Dagger
63d Fighter-Interceptor Squadron	527th Air Defense Group; 56th Fighter Group	F-89D	Apr 1955-Aug 1955	Wurtsmith Air Force Base, MI; Inactivated; replaced by 445th FIS (Project Arrow)
64th Fighter-Interceptor Squadron	10th Air Division	F-89C	Apr 1954-Aug 1957	Alaskan Air Command: Elmendorf Air Force Base, AK; Converted to F-102A Delta Dagger
65th Fighter-Interceptor Squadron	10th Air Division	F-89C; F-89D	Apr 1954-Jan 1958	Alaskan Air Command: Elmendorf Air Force Base, AK; to F-89D November 1954; inactivated Jan 1958
66th Fighter-Interceptor Squadron	10th Air Division	F-89C	Jul 1954-Nov 1957	Alaskan Air Command: Elmendorf Air Force Base, AK; Inactivated Jan 1958
74th Fighter-Interceptor Squadron	4711th Air Defense Wing; 528th Air Defense Group; 64th Air Division	F-89C; F-89D	Jun 1952-Jun 1958	Presque Isle Air Force Base, ME; to NEAC, Thule Air Base, Greenland; F-89D June 1955; inactivated June 1958
75th Fighter-Interceptor Squadron	23d Fighter Group	F-89D; F-89H	Aug 1955-Jul 1959	Presque Isle Air Force Base, ME; Replaced 318th FIS; F-89H April 1957; Converted to F-101B Voodoo July 1959
76th Fighter-Interceptor Squadron	23d Fighter Group; 35th Air Division; 32d Air Division	F-89D; F-89H; F-89J	Aug 1955-Apr 1961	Presque Isle Air Force Base, ME; McCoy Air Force Base, FL; Replaced 82d FIS; F-89H, November 1957; F-89J June 1959; Converted to F-102A April 1961
82d Fighter-Interceptor Squadron	28th Air Division	F-89D	Apr 1955-Aug 1955	Travis Air Force Base, CA; Inactivated; replaced by 76th FIS (Project Arrow)
83d Fighter-Interceptor Squadron	78th Fighter-Interceptor Group	F-89B	Oct 1951-Jun 1952	Hamilton Air Force Base, CA; Converted to F-86D Sabre Interceptor, June 1952
84th Fighter-Interceptor Squadron	78th Fighter-Interceptor Group	F-89B; F-89D; F-89H; F-89J	Jun 1951-Mar 1959	Hamilton Air Force Base, CA; First USAF F-89 Squadron; Converted to F-101B Voodoo, March 1959
98th Fighter-Interceptor Squadron	4621st Air Defense Wing; 4728th Air Defense Group; New York Air Defense Sector	F-89D; F-89J	Apr 1956-Jul 1959	Dover Air Force Base, DE; activated with F-89D; F-89J April 1957; Converted to F-101B Voodoo, July 1959
176th Fighter-Interceptor Squadron	128th Fighter-Interceptor Group	F-89C	Feb 1952-Nov 1952	Federalized Wisconsin Air National Guard during Korean War; Truax Field, WI, Federalized with F-89D; Only ANG unit during Korean War equipped with F-89; Returned to State Control, November 1952, re-equipped with F-51H Mustangs
318th Fighter-Interceptor Squadron	528th Air Defense Group	F-89D	Apr 1955-Aug 1955	Presque Isle Air Force Base, ME; Replaced by 75th FIS (Project Arrow), moved to McChord AFB, WA and re-equipped with F-86L Sabre Interceptor
319th Fighter-Interceptor Squadron	30th Air Division; Detroit Air Defense Sector	F-89J	Oct 1957-Feb 1960	Bunker Hill Air Force Base, IN; Westover Air Force Base, MA; converted to F-106A Delta Dart, February 1960
321st Fighter-Interceptor Squadron	326th Fighter-Interceptor Group	F-89D; F-89H; F-89J	Aug 1955-Mar 1960	Paine Air Force Base, WA; replaced 83d FIS; F-89H July 1956; F-89J Oct 1957; Inactivated March 1960
337th Fighter-Interceptor Squadron	514th Air Defense Group	F-89D	Jul 1954-Aug 1955	Minneapolis-St Paul International Airport, MN, Activated July 1954; Replaced in August 1955 by 432d FIS Project Arrow and moved to Westover AFB, MA; re-equipped with F-86D Sabre Interceptor
432d Fighter-Interceptor Squadron	475th Fighter Group	F-89D; F-89H	Aug 1955-Jan 1958	Minneapolis-Saint Paul International Airport, MN; Replaced 337th FIS; F-89H July 1956; Inactivated January 1958, assets to 109th FIS (Minnesota ANG)
433d Fighter-Interceptor Squadron	31st Air Division; 520th Air Defense Group; 11th Air Division; 5001st Air Defense Group; 32d Fighter Group	F-89C; F-89D	Nov 1952-Jan 1958	Truax Field, WI: Ladd Air Force Base, AK: Minot Air Force Base, ND; Took over ex 176th FIS aircraft; converted to F-89D sometime in 1955; inactivated January 1958
437th Fighter-Interceptor Squadron	414th Fighter Group	F-89D; F-89H; F-89J	Mar 1956-Jan 1960	Oxnard Air Force Base, CA; F-89H July 1956; F-89J March 1958; Converted to F-101B Voodoo January 1960
438th Fighter-Interceptor Squadron	507th Fighter Group	F-89D	Apr 1954-Jul 1957	Kincheloe Air Force Base, MI; Replaced with F-102A Delta Dagger, July 1957
445th Fighter-Interceptor Squadron	412th Fighter Group	F-89D; F-89H; F-89J	Aug 1955-Dec 1959	Wurtsmith Air Force Base, MI; Replaced 63d FIS, F-89H March 1956; F-89J October 1956; Converted to F-101B Voodoo December 1959
449th Fighter-Interceptor Squadron	5001st Air Defense Group; 11th Air Division	F-89D	Nov 1954-Aug 1960	Alaskan Air Command: Ladd Air Force Base, AK; inactivated August 1960
460th Fighter-Interceptor Squadron	337th Fighter Group	F-89D	Aug 1955-May 1958	Portland International Airport, OR; replaced 437th FIS; Converted to F-102A Delta Dagger, May 1958
465th Fighter-Interceptor Squadron	4711th Air Defense Wing; 32d Air Division; 4727th Air Defense Group	F-89D; F-89H; F-89J	Oct 1955-Jul 1959	Griffiss Air Force Base, NY; F-89H, May 1956; F-89J Apr 1957; Swapped designations with 49th FIS July 1959, Converted to F-86L Sabre Interceptor
497th Fighter-Interceptor Squadron	84th Fighter Group	F-89D	Apr 1954-Aug 1955	Portland International Airport, OR; converted to F-86D Sabre Interceptor
USAF Air Training Command squadrons
3625th Combat Crew Training Squadron	USAF Aircrew School (Interceptor)	F-89B	Dec 1951-Jan 1954	Tyndall Air Force Base, FL; Inactivated. Aircraft transferred to Alaska or Northeast Air Command
3533d Combat Crew Training Squadron	3550th Combat Crew Training Wing	F-89D; F-89H	Jul 1953-Jun 1957	Moody Air Force Base, GA; Inactivated. Training transferred to James Connolly AFB, TX
	4750th Pilot Training Wing	F-89D; F-89H; F-89J	Nov 1956-Jul 1958	Yuma County Airport, AZ; Inactivated. Training transferred to James Connolly AFB, TX
	3565th Training Wing	F-89D; F-89H; F-89J	Jun 1957-Jun 1968	James Connally Air Force Base, TX; Inactivated.
Air National Guard squadrons
103d Fighter-Interceptor Squadron	111th Fighter-Interceptor Group	F-89H; F-89J	May 1959-May 1962	Philadelphia International Airport, PA; Pennsylvania Air National Guard; F-89J July 1961; Converted to C-97 Stratofreighter May 1962
107th Fighter-Interceptor Squadron	127th Fighter-Interceptor Group	F-89C	Jan 1958-Jan 1960	Detroit-Wayne Major Airport, MI; Michigan Air National Guard; Converted to RF-84F Thunderstreak April 1958
109th Fighter-Interceptor Squadron	133d Fighter Group	F-89H	Feb 1955-Apr 1958	Minneapolis-St Paul International Airport, MN; Minnesota Air National Guard; Converted to C-97A Stratofreighter January 1960
116th Fighter-Interceptor Squadron	141st Fighter Group	F-89D; F-89J	Apr 1958-Jul 1965	Geiger Field, WA; Washington Air National Guard; F-89J July 1960; Converted to F-102A July 1965
123d Fighter-Interceptor Squadron	142d Fighter-Interceptor Group	F-89D; F-89H; F-89J	Jun 1957-Jan 1966	Portland International Airport, OR; Oregon Air National Guard; F-89H July 1958; F-89J March 1960; Converted to F-102A Delta Dagger January 1966
124th Fighter-Interceptor Squadron	132d Fighter-Interceptor Group	F-89J	Apr 1962-Jul 1969	Des Moines Municipal Airport, IA; Iowa Air National Guard; F-89H July 1958; Received F-89Js from 126th FIS; Converted to F-84F Thunderstreak July 1969; Last ANG F-89 Squadron
126th Fighter-Interceptor Squadron	128th Fighter-Interceptor Wing	F-89B/C; F-89D; F-89J	Sep 1954-Jun 1960	General Mitchell Field, WI; Wisconsin Air National Guard; First ANG F-89 Squadron; Received F-89D/J June 1960, then converted to KC-97 tankers almost immediately
132d Fighter-Interceptor Squadron	101st Air Defense Wing	F-89D; F-89J	Sep 1957-Jul 1969	Dow Air Force Base, ME; Maine Air National Guard; F-89J January 1960; Converted to F-102A Delta Dagger July 1969
134th Fighter-Interceptor Squadron	158th Fighter-Interceptor Group	F-89D; F-89J	Apr 1958-Jul 1965	Ethan Allen Air Force Base, VT; Vermont Air National Guard; F-89J July 1960; Converted to F-102A Delta Dagger July 1965
171st Fighter-Interceptor Squadron	127th Fighter Group	F-89C	Feb 1955-Apr 1958	Detroit-Wayne Major Airport, MI; Michigan Air National Guard; Converted to RF-84F Thunderstreak April 1958
172d Fighter-Interceptor Squadron	110th Fighter-Interceptor Group; 127th Fighter-Interceptor Group	F-89C	Feb 1955-Apr 1958	W. K. Kellogg Airport, MI; Michigan Air National Guard; Converted to B-57A Canberra Spring 1958
175th Fighter-Interceptor Squadron	114th Fighter-Interceptor Group	F-89D	Apr 1958-Jul 1960	Sioux Falls Regional Airport, SD; South Dakota Air National Guard; Converted to F-102A Delta Dagger, July 1960
176th Fighter-Interceptor Squadron	128th Fighter-Interceptor Group; 115th Fighter-Interceptor Group	F-89B/C; F-89D; F-89H; F-89J	Sep 1954-Apr 1966	Truax Field, WI; Wisconsin Air National Guard; First ANG F-89 Squadron; F-89D, August 1958; F-89J Jan 1960; Converted to F-102A Delta Dagger April 1966
178th Fighter-Interceptor Squadron	133d Fighter-Interceptor Group; 119th Fighter Group	F-89D	May 1958-Jul 1966	Hector Field, ND; North Dakota Air National Guard; Converted to F-102A Delta Dagger July 1966
179th Fighter-Interceptor Squadron	133d Fighter-Interceptor Group; 148th Fighter Group	F-89D; F-89H	Sep 1957-Nov 1966	Duluth Airport, MN; Minnesota Air National Guard; F-89H November 1959; Converted to F-102A Delta Dagger November 1966
186th Fighter-Interceptor Squadron	140th Fighter Group; 120th Fighter Group	F-89C; F-89H; F-89J	Apr 1956-Jul 1966	Great Falls International Airport, MT; Montana Air National Guard; F-89H April 1958; F-89J March 1960; Converted to F-102A Delta Dagger July 1966
190th Fighter-Interceptor Squadron	140th Fighter-Bomber Group; 124th Fighter Group	F-89B	May 1956-July 1959	Gowen Field, ID; Idaho Air National Guard; Converted to F-86L Sabre Interceptor, July 1959
