= 528th Air Defense Group =

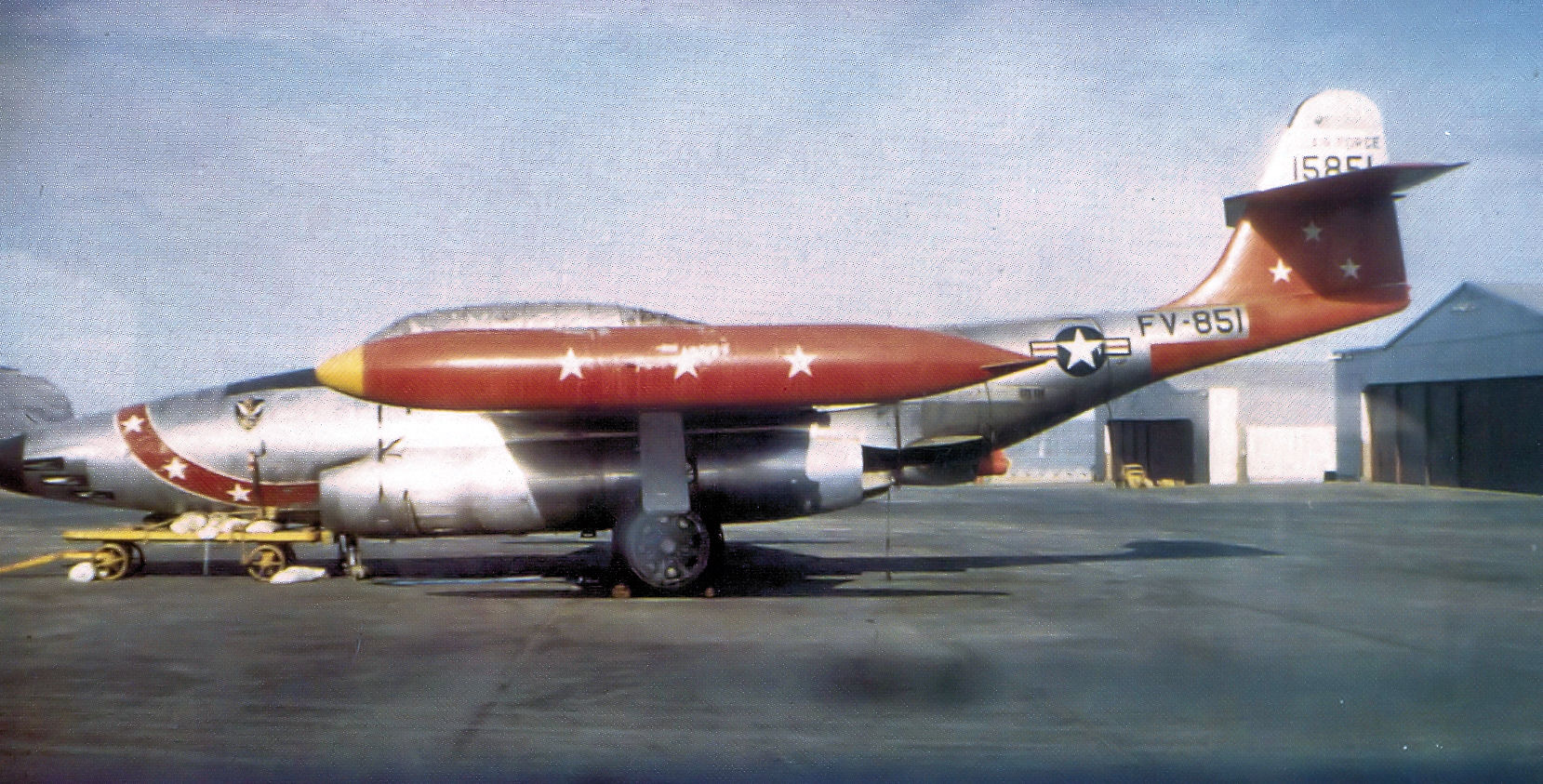
- F-89C of the Group's 74th Fighter-Interceptor Squadron (Note: Aircraft is Northrop F-89C-40-NO Scorpion, serial 51-5851. Taken at Presque Isle Air Force Base in 1954. This aircraft was transferred to the Wisconsin Air National Guard. It was transferred to the Military Aircraft Storage and Disposition Center on 18 January 1958 and scrapped on 28 April 1958.)
- Active: 1945; 1953–1955
- Country: United States
- Branch: United States Air Force
- Type: Fighter interceptor
- Role: Air defense

The 528th Air Defense Group is a disbanded United States Air Force organization. Its last assignment was with the 4711th Air Defense Wing at Presque Isle Air Force Base, Maine, where it was inactivated on 18 August 1955. The group was originally activated as the 528th Air Service Group, a support unit for the 97th Bombardment Group at the end of World War II in Italy.

The group was activated once again in 1953, when Air Defense Command (ADC) established it as the headquarters for a dispersed fighter-interceptor squadron and the medical, aircraft maintenance, and administrative squadrons supporting it. It was replaced in 1955 when ADC transferred its mission, equipment, and personnel to the 23d Fighter Group in a project that replaced air defense groups commanding fighter squadrons with fighter groups with distinguished records during World War II.

== History ==
=== World War II ===
The group was first activated in Italy as the 528th Air Service Group about VE Day in a reorganization of Army Air Forces (AAF) support groups in which the AAF replaced service groups that included personnel from other branches of the Army and supported two combat groups with air service groups including only Air Corps units and designed to support a single combat group. Its 954th Air Engineering Squadron provided maintenance that was beyond the capability of the combat group, its 778th Air Materiel Squadron handled all supply matters, and its Headquarters & Base Services Squadron provided other support. The group provided support for 97th Bombardment Group in Italy in 1945. It was disbanded in 1948.

=== Cold War ===
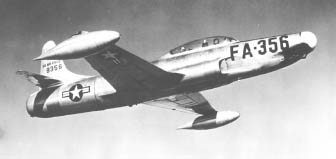
F-94B Starfire as flown by the 74th FIS (Note: Aircraft is Lockheed F-94B-5-LO, serial 51-5356. It was later transferred to the French Air Force)

The group was reconstituted during the Cold War, redesignated as the 528th Air Defense Group, and activated at Presque Isle Air Force Base, Maine in 1953 with responsibility for air defense of Northeastern US. The 529th was assigned the 74th Fighter-Interceptor Squadron (FIS), which was already stationed at Presque Isle flying cannon armed and airborne intercept radar equipped Lockheed F-94 Starfires as its operational component. The 74th FIS had been assigned directly to the 4711th Defense Wing. The group also replaced the 85th Air Base Squadron as USAF host organization at Presque Isle. it was assigned three squadrons to perform its support responsibilities.

In March 1953, the 57th Fighter-Interceptor Squadron, flying Northrop F-89 Scorpions was activated at Presque Isle as the group's second operational squadron. In June, the 74th FIS also converted to Scorpions. The 74th FIS moved to Greenland and was reassigned away from the group in August 1954. A few days earlier, in a swap of units, the 318th Fighter Interceptor Squadron had moved from Greenland and was reassigned to the group to replace the 74th FIS. Upon arrival at Presque Isle, the 318th FIS converted to newer model Scorpions armed with Mighty Mouse rockets. A second swap of units began when the 82d Fighter Interceptor Squadron arrived from Iceland the same day the 74th FIS left for Greenland, and also converted to "Scorpions". The 57th FIS then moved to Iceland and was reassigned away from the group in November of the same year. The group was inactivated and replaced by the 23d Fighter Group (Air Defense) in 1955 as result of Air Defense Command's Project Arrow, which was designed to bring back on the active list the fighter units which had compiled memorable records in the two world wars. The group was disbanded once again in 1984.

== Lineage ==
- Constituted as 528th Air Service Group

Activated on 18 May 1945
Inactivated c. 18 October 1945
Disbanded on 8 October 1948

- Reconstituted and redesignated as: 528th Air Defense Group on 21 January 1953

Activated on 16 February 1953
Inactivated on 18 August 1955
Disbanded on 27 September 1984

=== Assignments ===
- Unknown, 18 May 1945 – 1945 (Note: Probably XV Air Force Service Command.)
- 4711th Defense Wing (later 4711th Air Defense Wing), 15 February 1953 – 18 August 1955

=== Stations ===
- Amendola, Italy, 18 May 1945 – 1945
- Presque Isle Air Force Base, Maine, 15 February 1953 – 18 August 1955

=== Components ===
Operational Squadrons

- 57th Fighter-Interceptor Squadron, 27 March 1953 – 12 November 1954
- 74th Fighter-Interceptor Squadron, 16 February 1953 – 21 August 1954
- 82d Fighter Interceptor Squadron, 21 August 1954 – 18 August 1955
- 318th Fighter Interceptor Squadron, 8 August 1954 – 18 August 1955

Support Units

- 528th Air Base Squadron, 16 February 1953 – 18 August 1955
- 528th Materiel Squadron, 16 February 1953 – 18 August 1955 included base flight and aero repair
- 528th Medical Squadron (later 528th USAF Infirmary), 16 February 1953 – 18 August 1955
- 778th Air Materiel Squadron, 18 May 1945 – 1945
- 954th Air Engineering Squadron, 18 May 1945 – 1945

=== Aircraft ===
- Northrop F-89C Scorpion, 1953–1954
- Northrop F-89D Scorpion, 1954–1955
- Lockheed F-94B Starfire, 1953, 1954

== See also ==
- Aerospace Defense Command Fighter Squadrons
- F-89 Scorpion units of the United States Air Force
- F-94 Starfire units of the United States Air Force
