= 37th Flying Training Squadron =

37th Flying Training Squadron

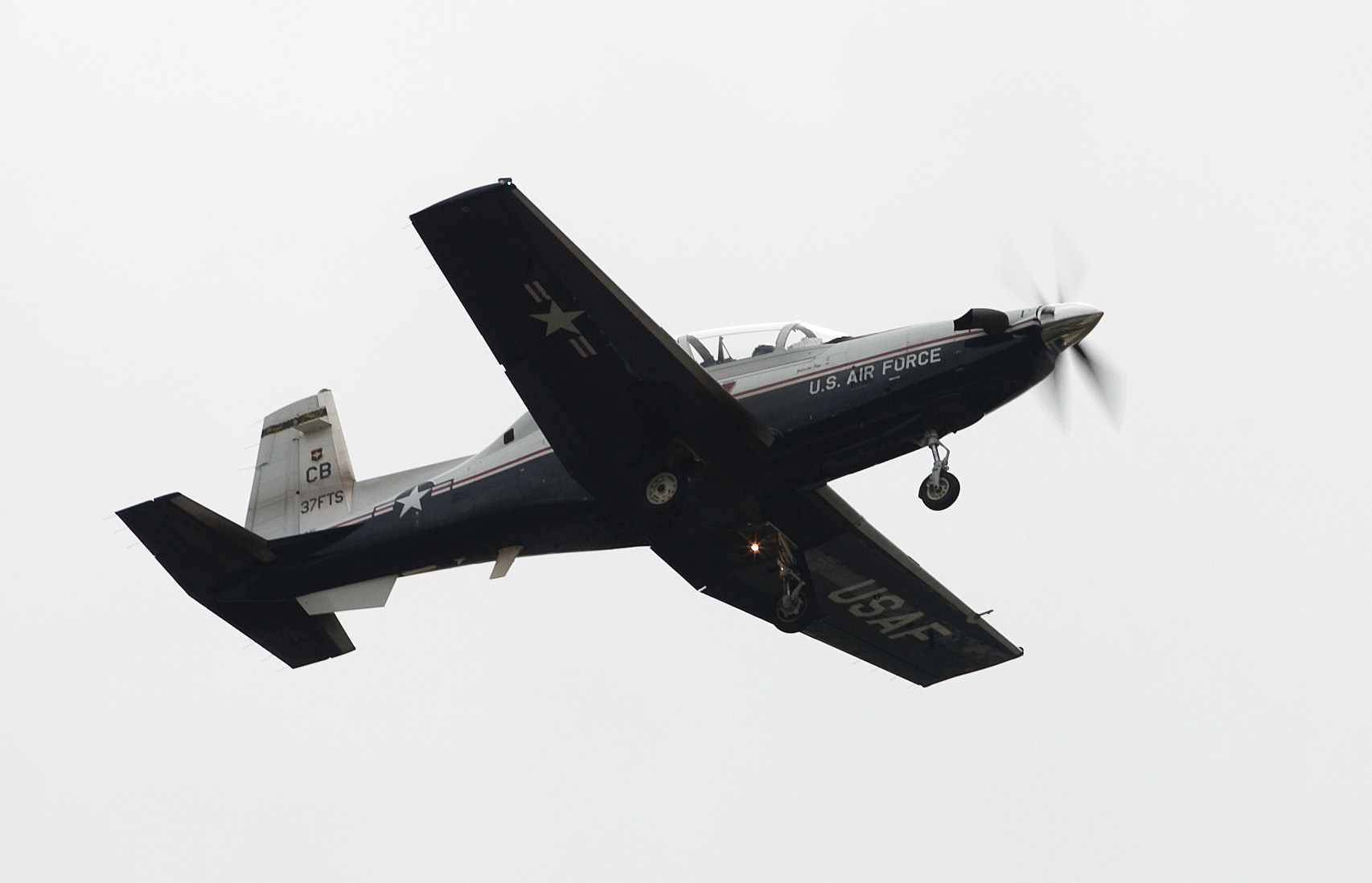
- 37th Flying Training Squadron T-6 Texan II
- Active: 1941–1945; 1946–1949; 1952–1960; 1972–present
- Country: United States
- Branch: United States Air Force
- Role: Pilot Training
- Part of: Air Education and Training Command; 14th Flying Training Wing; 14th Operations Group
- Garrison/HQ: Columbus Air Force Base
- Nickname: Bengal Tigers
- Engagements: World War II
- Decorations: Distinguished Unit Citation; Air Force Outstanding Unit Award

Commanders
- Current commander: Lt. Col. Peter Hince

Insignia
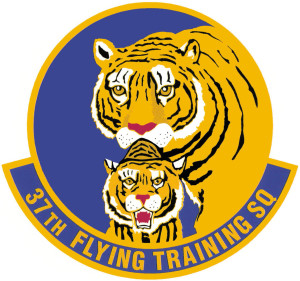
- 37th Flying Training Squadron emblem (approved 10 November 1972)

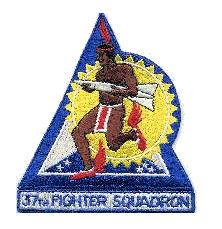
- Patch showing 37th Fighter-Interceptor Squadron emblem (approved 9 September 1958)

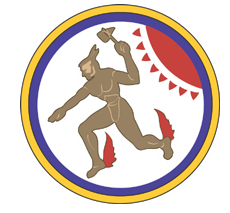
- 37th Pursuit Squadron emblem (approved 13 February 1942)

The 37th Flying Training Squadron is part of the 14th Flying Training Wing based at Columbus Air Force Base, Mississippi. It operates Beechcraft T-6 Texan II aircraft conducting flight training.

The squadron was first established as the 37th Pursuit Squadron and activated in January 1941. As the 37th Fighter Squadron it saw combat during World War II in the Mediterranean and European Theaters, and was awarded a Distinguished Unit Citation for action over Austria in 1944. It was inactivated after war's end in 1945.

The squadron was active with Air Defense Command in the northeastern United States from 1946 to 1949. Originally equipped with propeller fighters, it became one of the first units equipped with the Republic F-84 Thunderjet. As the 37th Fighter-Interceptor Squadron', the unit once again was assigned the mission of defending the northeastern United States from 1952 to 1960.

The squadron has conducted flying training since 1972 as the 37th Flying Training Squadron.

== Mission ==
The 37th Flying Training Squadron conducts primary flight training in the T-6 Texan II. Seated with an instructor, each student receives about 81 hours of training in this aircraft. Students learn basic aircraft characteristics and control, takeoff and landing techniques, aerobatics, and night, instrument and formation flying. The 37th Flying Training Squadron is currently commanded by Lt Col Aaron Tillman. The 37th Flying Training Squadron Commander Spouse and Key Spouse Mentor is Mrs. Christina Tillman.

== History ==
=== World War II ===
The 37th conducted air defense in the northwestern U.S. between 7 and 24 December 1941 then went on to fly combat missions in the European Theater of Operations and the Mediterranean Theater of Operations from 6 May 1943 to 4 May 1945.

The squadron was first activated as the 37th Pursuit Squadron in January 1941 at Hamilton Field, California. as one of the original squadrons of the 55th Pursuit Group. It moved to Portland Airport, Oregon in early June 1941. The squadron trained with Republic P-43 Lancers until it received Lockheed P-38 Lightnings It deployed to Paine Field, Washington to fly patrols on the west coast of the US after the Japanese attack on Pearl Harbor.

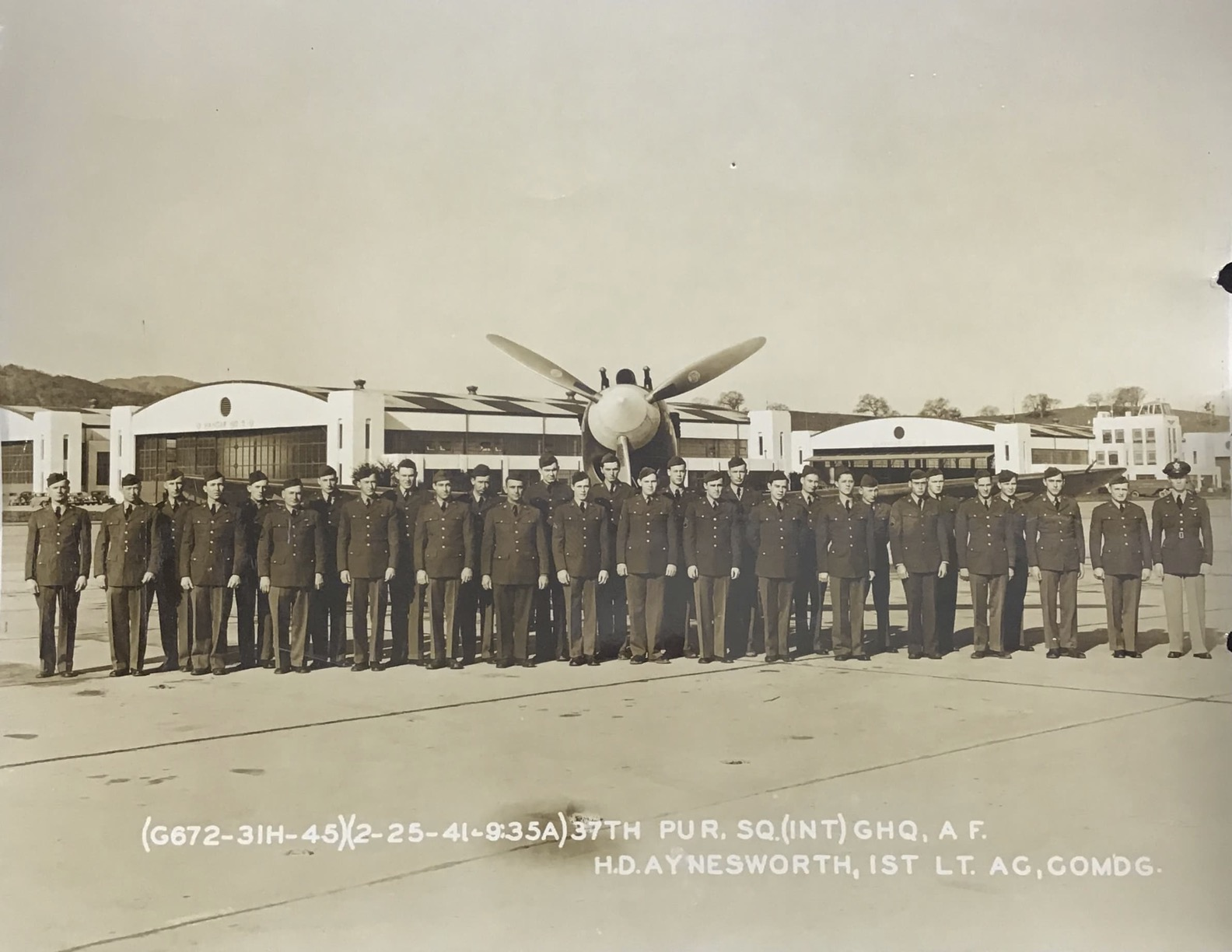
37th Pursuit Squadron Feb 1941

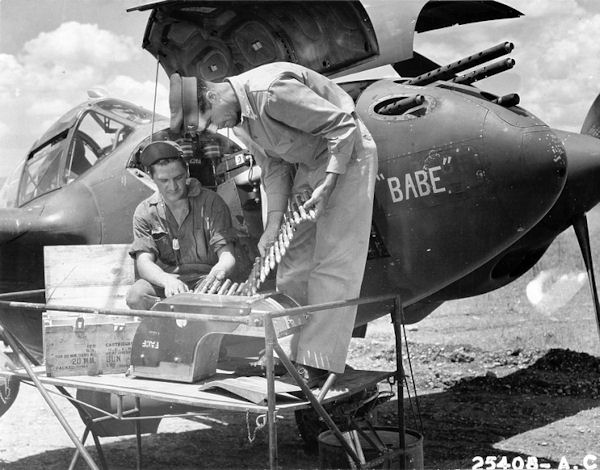
14th Fighter Group P-38 being serviced in North Africa, 1943

The squadron converted to Lightnings in 1942. In February 1943 it was detached from its parent group and deployed to North Africa, where it was assigned to the 14th Fighter Group the following month. The 14th group had temporarily withdrawn from combat, with some of its men and planes being reassigned to the 1st and 82d Fighter Groups.

The squadron began combat operations in May, after being re-equipped with the P-38F and some P-38Gs. Already prior to the Axis defeat in Tunisia, the Northwest African Air Forces had begun preparations for the invasion of Sicily. The 37th flew dive-bombing missions during the Allied assault on Pantelleria. It helped prepare for and support the invasions of Sicily and Italy.

The unit became part of Fifteenth Air Force in November 1943, and moved to Triolo Airfield, Italy. It engaged primarily in escort work flying missions to cover bombers engaged in long-range operations against strategic objectives in Italy, France, Germany, Czechoslovakia, Austria, Hungary, Yugoslavia, Rumania, and Bulgaria. On 2 April 1944, the squadron earned a Distinguished Unit Citation for beating off attacks by enemy fighters while escorting bombers attacking ball-bearing and aircraft production facilities at Steyr, Austria, enabling the bombers to strike their targets.

The squadron provided escort for reconnaissance operations, supported Operation Dragoon, the invasion of Southern France, in August 1944, and on numerous occasions flew long-range missions to strafe and dive-bomb motor vehicles, trains, bridges, supply areas, airdromes, and troop concentrations in an area extending from France to the Balkans. The 37th Fighter Squadron was inactivated in Italy on 9 September 1945. During its time in combat the 37th Fighter Squadron was credited with destroying 49.5 enemy aircraft in air-to-air combat.

=== Cold War air defense ===
==== Operations from Dow Air Force Base ====
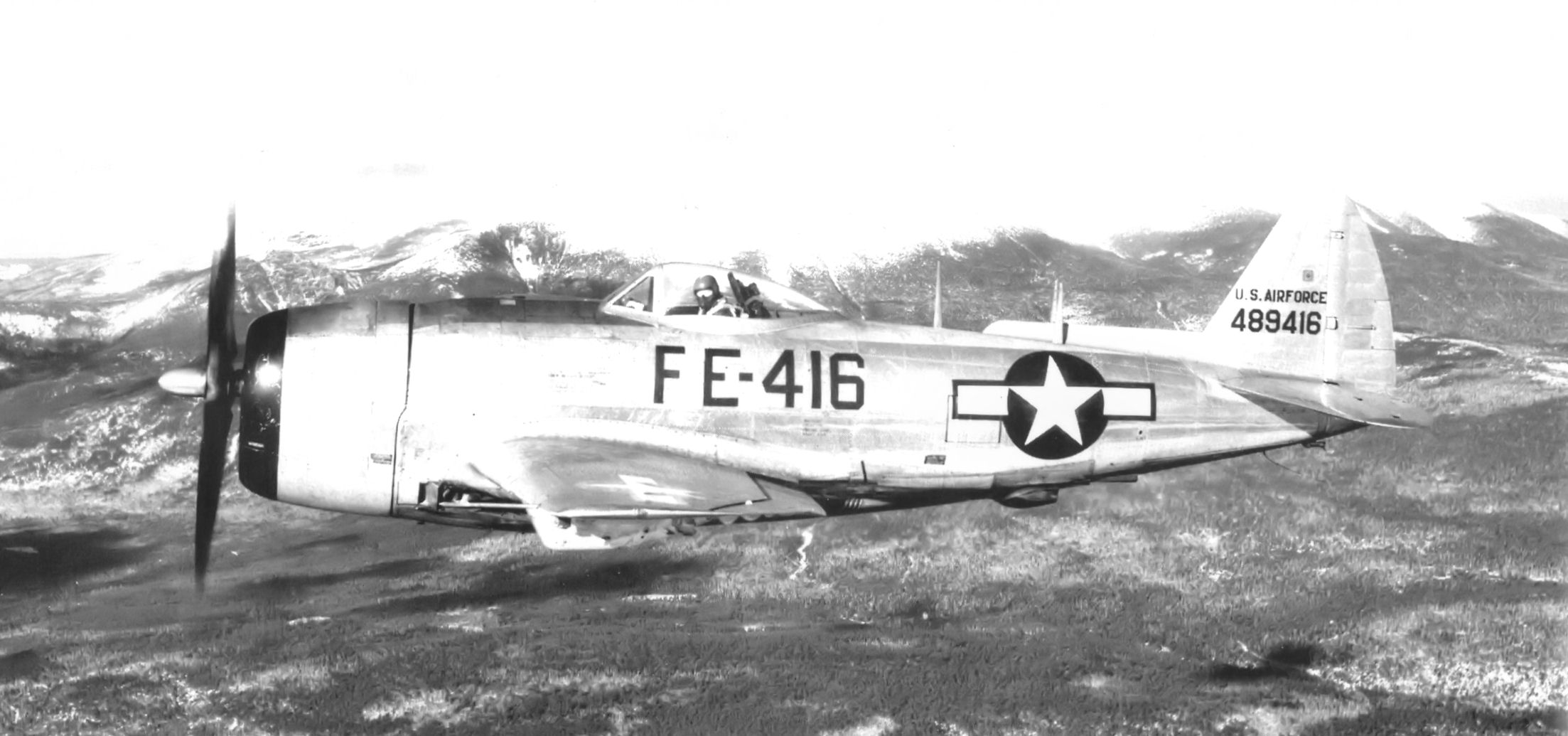
37th Fighter Squadron Republic F-47N Thunderbolt 1948 Dow AFB

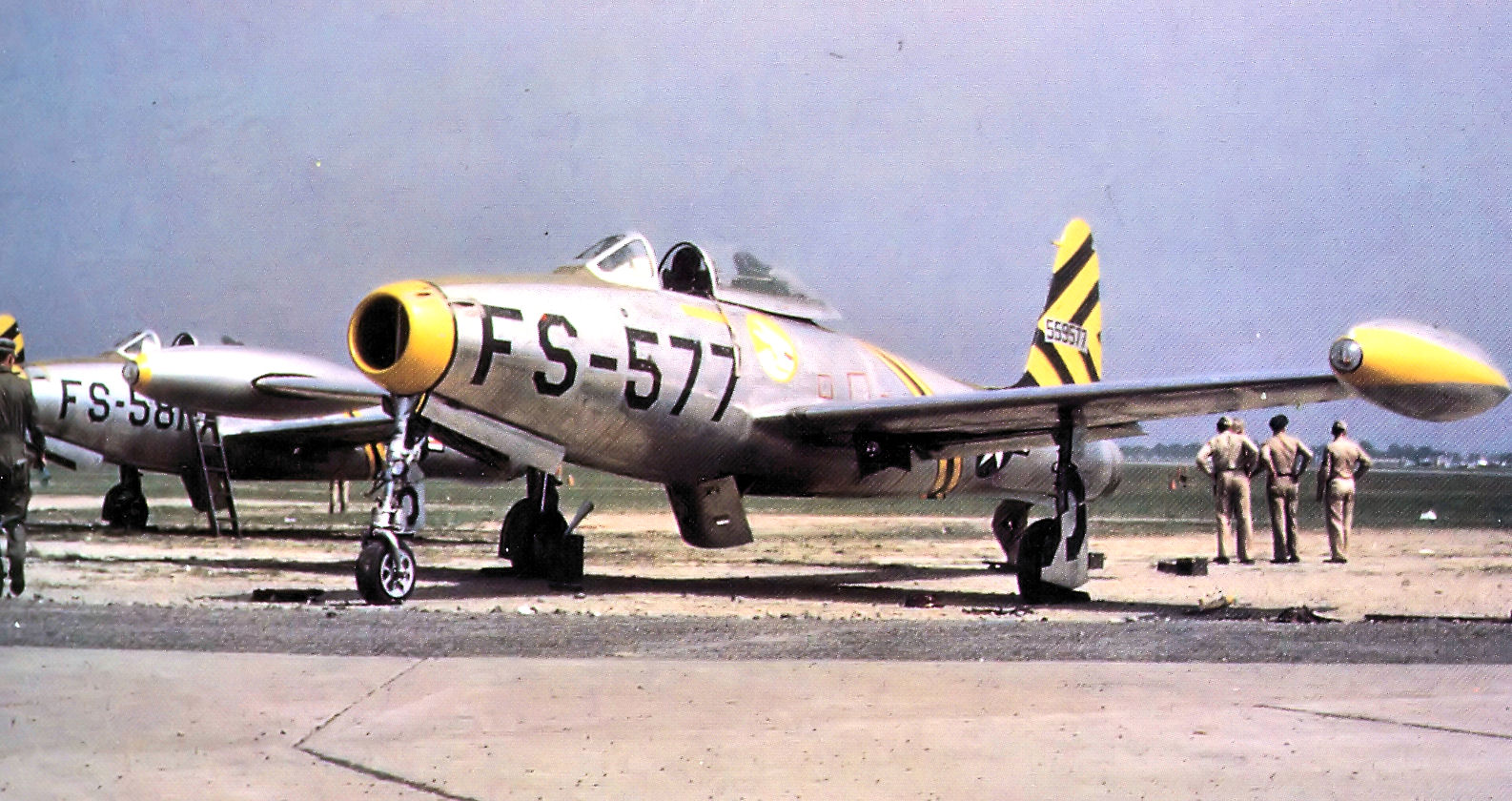
37th FS F-84B 45-59577, about 1948 at Dow AFB, Maine

The squadron was once more activated in the US on 20 November 1946 at Dow Field, Maine as part of the First Air Force of Air Defense Command (ADC). The squadron was one of the first operational units assigned to ADC.

The 37th was initially equipped with Republic P-47N Thunderbolts and later with first-generation Republic P-84B Thunderjets. It was responsible for air defense of the Northeastern United States. In 1947, the units's parent group became the first in the AAF to equip with the P-84.

The 37th's mission was daylight and fair weather defense of northeast United States from New York City north to the Maine/New Brunswick border, shared with 52d Fighter Group (All-Weather) at Mitchel Air Force Base, New York which flew North American F-82 Twin Mustangs for night and inclement weather operations. The squadron was inactivated on 2 October 1949 due to budget cutbacks.

==== Operations from Ethan Allen Air Force Base ====
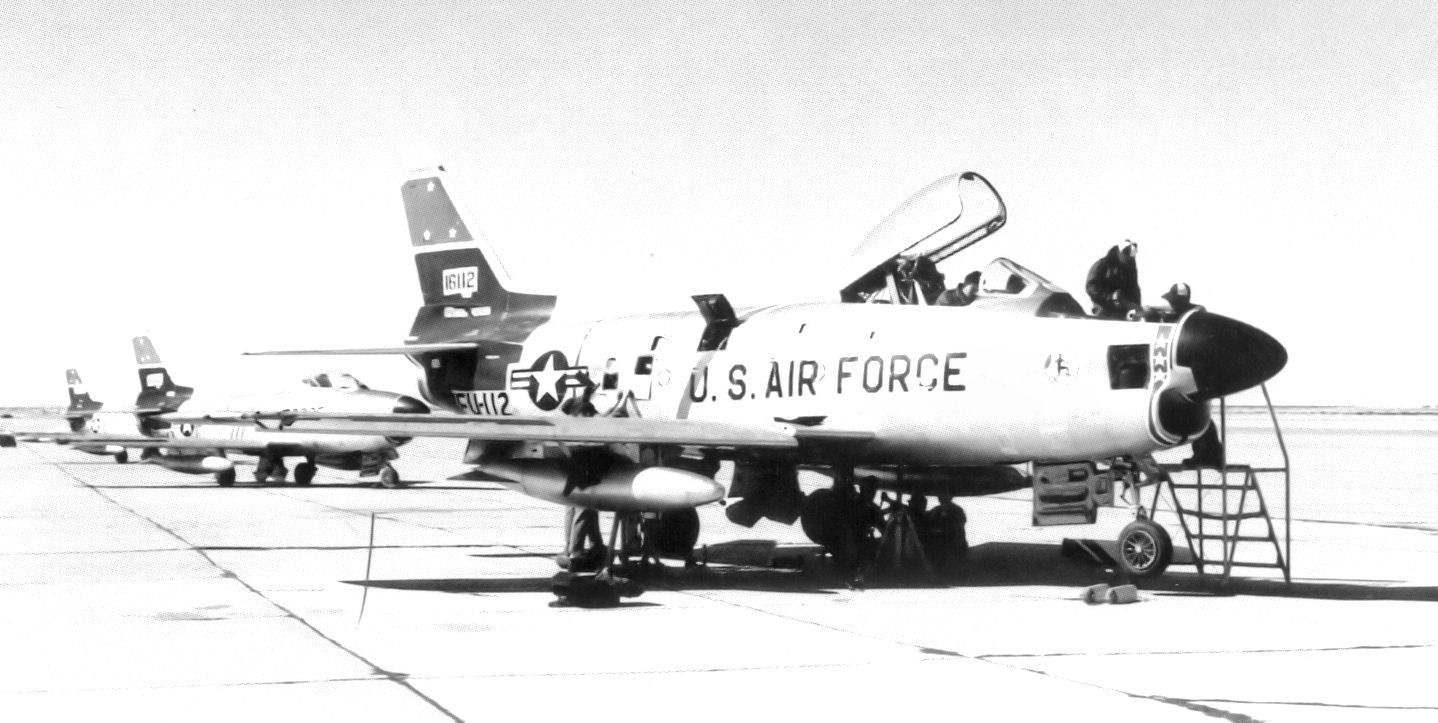
F-86D Sabre of the 517th Air Defense Group (Note: Aircraft is North American F-86D serial 51-6112 at Yuma Air Force Base, Arizona in February 1955.)

In late 1952, the squadron, now designated the 37th Fighter-Interceptor Squadron, was again activated under ADC and assigned to the 4711th Defense Wing. It was stationed at Ethan Allen Air Force Base, Vermont, where it replaced the federalized 134th Fighter-Interceptor Squadron, which was returned to the control of the Vermont Air National Guard. The 37th took over the personnel, mission, and World War II era North American F-51D Mustang aircraft of the inactivating 134th. The squadron was tasked with defending the New England area against the threat of manned bomber attacks.

In February 1953 the squadron converted to airborne intercept radar equipped and Mighty Mouse rocket armed North American F-86D Sabres. In the same month, ADC reorganized its dispersed fighter units, combining the fighter squadrons with support units into air defense groups. As a result of this reorganization, the 517th Air Defense Group was formed at Ethan Allen and the squadron was assigned to it.

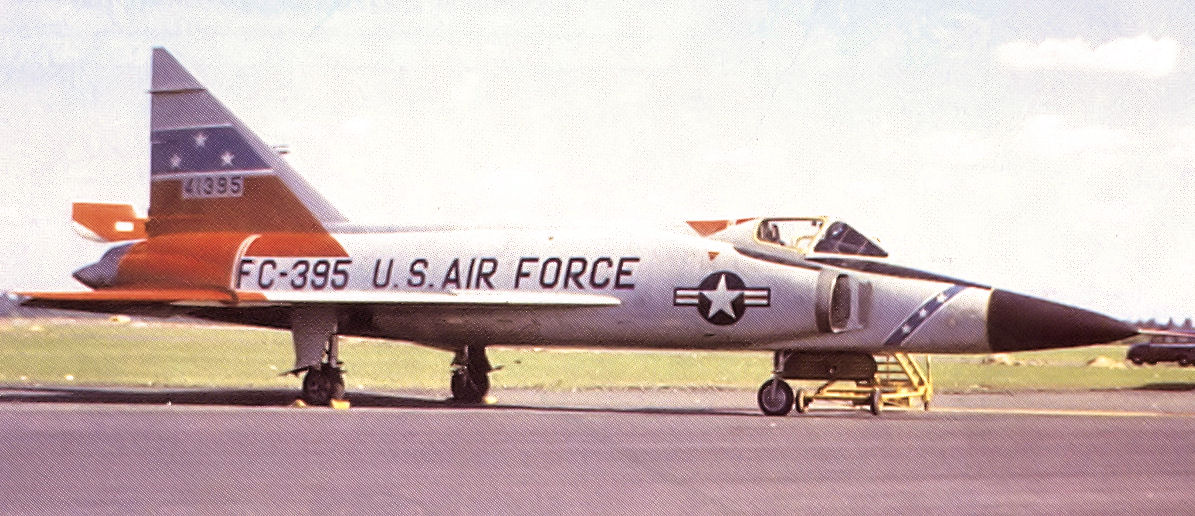
37th Fighter-Interceptor Squadron F-102 Delta Dagger (Note: Aircraft is Convair F-102A-35-CO Delta Dagger 54-1395, about 1958. This aircraft was retired to The Military Aircraft Storage and Disposition Center in 1970 It was converted to QF-102A (later to PQM-102B) configuration, transferred to the 82d Tactical Aerial Targets Squadron and expended as a target during the early 1980s.)

In August 1955 ADC implemented Project Arrow, which was designed to bring back on the active list the fighter units that had compiled memorable records in the two world wars. As part of this project, the squadron's headquarters of World War II was reactivated. The 14th Fighter Group (Air Defense) assumed the mission, personnel, and equipment of the 517th Air Defense Group, which was simultaneously inactivated. The squadron upgraded to AIM-4 Falcon armed Convair F-102 Delta Daggers in December 1957. These aircraft were supersonic and equipped with data link for interception control through the Semi-Automatic Ground Environment system. In June 1960, the Air Force terminated its active duty presence at Ethan Allen and the squadron and its parent group were inactivated.

=== Pilot Training ===
In 1972 Air Training Command began to replace its Major Command Controlled (MAJCON) flying training units with Air Force Controlled (AFCON) units. Unlike MAJCON units, which could not carry a permanent history or lineage, AFCON units can continue the lineage and history of earlier units. The squadron was redesignated the 37th Flying Training Squadron and absorbed the mission, personnel, and equipment of the 3650th Pilot Training Squadron which was inactivated. The 37th has provided Undergraduate Pilot Training since 1 June 1972. It presently conducts primary flight training in the T-6 Texan II. Students receive about 81 hours of training in this aircraft. Students learn basic aircraft characteristics and control, takeoff and landing techniques, aerobatics, and night, instrument and formation flying.

== Lineage ==
- Constituted as the 37th Pursuit Squadron (Interceptor) on 20 November 1940

Activated on 15 January 1941
Redesignated 37th Pursuit Squadron (Interceptor) (Twin Engine) on 20 November 1940
Redesignated 37th Fighter Squadron (Twin Engine) on 15 May 1942
Redesignated 37th Fighter Squadron, Two Engine on 28 February 1944
Inactivated on 9 September 1945

- Activated on 20 November 1946

Inactivated on 2 October 1949

- Redesignated 37th Fighter-Interceptor Squadron on 11 September 1952

Activated on 1 November 1952
Discontinued on 1 May 1960

- Redesignated 37th Flying Training Squadron on 22 March 1972

Activated on 1 June 1972.

=== Assignments ===
- 55th Pursuit Group (later 55th Fighter Group), 15 January 1941
- 14th Fighter Group, 1 March 1943 – 9 September 1945
- 14th Fighter Group, 20 November 1946 – 2 October 1949
- 4711th Defense Wing 1 November 1952
- 517th Air Defense Group, 16 February 1953
- 14th Fighter Group (Air Defense), 18 August 1955 – 1 May 1960
- 14th Flying Training Wing, 1 June 1972
- 14th Operations Group, 15 December 1991–.

=== Stations ===
- Hamilton Field, California, 15 January 1941
- Portland Airport, Oregon, 21 May 1941

Operated from Paine Field, Washington, 7 December 1941 – 24 December 1941

- Olympia Army Airfield, Washington, 24 December 1941
- McChord Field, Washington, 8 January 1943 – 18 January 1943
- La Senia Airfield, Algeria, 27 February 1943
- Mediouna Airfield, French Morocco, c. 17 March 1943
- Telergma Airfield, Algeria, 5 May 1943
- El Bathan Airfield, Tunisia, 4 July 1943
- Sainte Marie du Zit Airfield, Tunisia, 26 July 1943
- Triolo Airfield, Italy, 12 December 1943

Operated from Corsica, 10 August 1944 – 21 August 1944

- Lesina Airfield, Italy, September 1945 – 9 September 1945
- Dow Field (later Dow Air Force Base), Maine, 20 November 1946 – 2 October 1949
- Ethan Allen Air Force Base, Vermont, 1 November 1952 – 1 May 1960
- Columbus Air Force Base, Mississippi 1 June 1972 – present

=== Aircraft ===
- Republic P-43 Lancer (1941–1942)
- Lockheed P-38 Lightning (1942–1945)
- Republic P-47 Thunderbolt (1946–1949)
- Republic P-84 (later F-84) Thunderjet (1947–1949)
- North American F-51D Mustang (1952–1953)
- North American F-86D Sabre (1953–1958)
- Convair F-102 Delta Dagger (1957–1960)
- T-37 Tweet (1972–2008)
- T-6 Texan II ( – Present)

=== Awards and campaigns ===
Award streamer	Award	Dates	Notes
	Distinguished Unit Citation	2 April 1944	37th Fighter Squadron, Austria
	Air Force Outstanding Unit Award	1 January 1974-31 December 1974	37th Flying Training Squadron
	Air Force Outstanding Unit Award	1 March 1978-29 February 1980	37th Flying Training Squadron
	Air Force Outstanding Unit Award	1 April 1985-31 March 1987	37th Flying Training Squadron
	Air Force Outstanding Unit Award	1 July 1992-30 June 1994	14th Operations Group
	Air Force Outstanding Unit Award	1 July 1999-30 June 2001	14th Operations Group
	Air Force Outstanding Unit Award	1 July 2001–30 June 2002	14th Operations Group
	Air Force Outstanding Unit Award	1 July 2002–30 June 2004	14th Operations Group
	Air Force Outstanding Unit Award	1 July 2004–30 June 2006	14th Operations Group
	Air Force Outstanding Unit Award	1 July 2006–30 June 2007	14th Operations Group
	Air Force Outstanding Unit Award	1 July 2007–30 June 2009	14th Operations Group
	Air Force Outstanding Unit Award	1 July 2009–30 June 2010	14th Operations Group
	Air Force Outstanding Unit Award	1 July 2010–30 June 2011	14th Operations Group

Campaign Streamer	Campaign	Dates	Notes
	Air Combat, EAME Theater	27 February 1943 – 11 May 1945	37th Fighter Squadron
	Air Offensive, Europe	18 August 1942 – 5 June 1944	37th Fighter Squadron
	Tunisia	27 February 1943 – 13 May 1943	37th Fighter Squadron
	Sicily	14 May 1943 – 17 August 1943	37th Fighter Squadron
	Naples-Foggia	18 August 1943 – 21 January 1944	37th Fighter Squadron
	Rome-Arno	22 January 1944 – 9 September 1944	37th Fighter Squadron
	Northern France	25 July 1944 – 14 September 1944	37th Fighter Squadron
	Southern France	15 August 1944 – 14 September 1944	37th Fighter Squadron
	North Apennines	10 September 1944 – 4 April 1945	37th Fighter Squadron
	Rhineland	15 September 1944 – 21 March 1945	37th Fighter Squadron
	Central Europe	22 March 1944 – 21 May 1945	37th Fighter Squadron
	Po Valley	3 April 1945 – 8 May 1945	37th Fighter Squadron
