= 514th Air Defense Group =

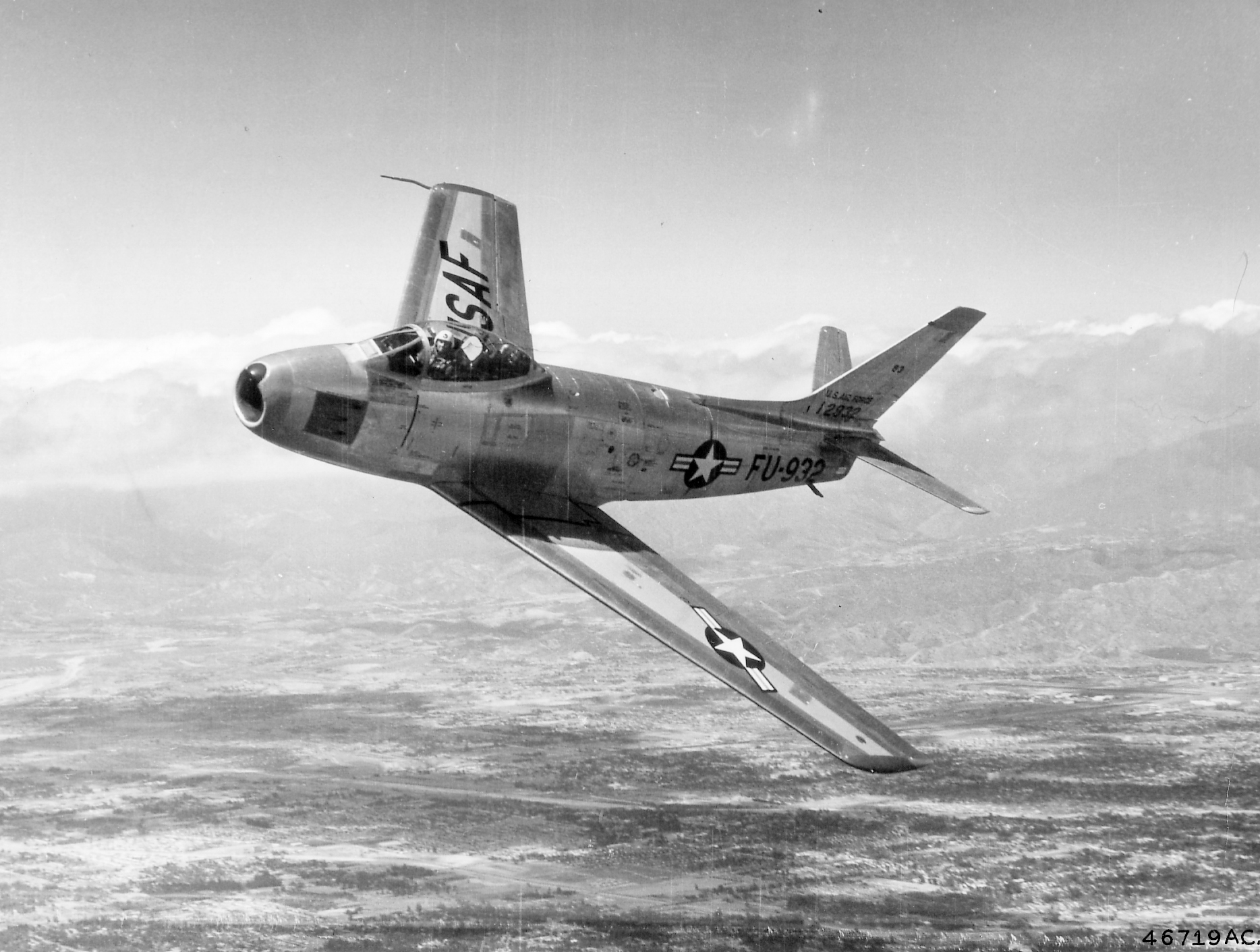
- North American F-86F Sabre, which equipped the group's 18th FIS
- Active: 1944–1946; 1953–1955
- Country: United States
- Branch: United States Air Force
- Role: Air defense

The 514th Air Defense Group is a disbanded United States Air Force (USAF) organization. Its last assignment was with the 31st Air Division at Minneapolis-St. Paul International Airport, Minnesota, where it was inactivated on 18 August 1955. The group was originally activated as a support group for the 319th Bombardment Group in Italy at the end of World War II. After the end of combat in Europe, it deployed to Okinawa, where it was inactivated.

The group was activated once again in 1953, when Air Defense Command (ADC) established it as the headquarters for a dispersed fighter-interceptor squadron and the medical, aircraft maintenance, and administrative squadrons supporting it. It was replaced in 1955 when ADC transferred its mission, equipment, and personnel to the 475th Fighter Group in a project that replaced air defense groups commanding fighter squadrons with fighter groups with distinguished records during World War II.

== History ==
=== World War II ===
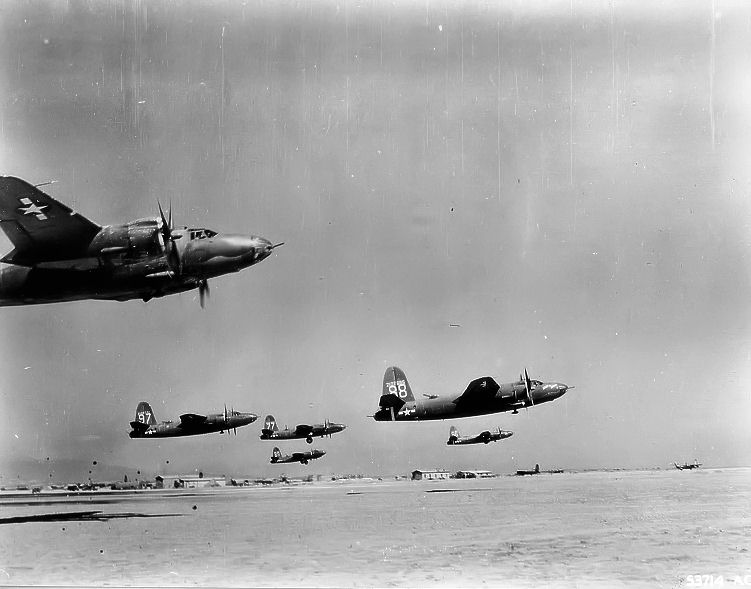
319th Bomb Group B-26s take off

The group was activated as the 514th Air Service Group in late 1944, absorbing its personnel and equipment from the 306th Service Group as part of a reorganization of Army Air Forces (AAF) support groups in which the AAF replaced service groups that included personnel from other branches of the Army and supported two combat groups with air service groups including only Air Corps units. The group drew its personnel and equipment from the disbanded 306th Service Group The 514th was designed to support a single combat group. Its 940th Air Engineering Squadron provided maintenance that was beyond the capability of the combat group, its 764th Air Materiel Squadron handled all supply matters, and its Headquarters & Base Services Squadron provided other support. The 514th supported the 319th Bombardment Group in Italy, then returned to the United States for transfer to the Pacific Theater. The group sailed from Naples, Italy to Boston, Massachusetts. Upon arrival in the United States members of the group received 30-day leaves, following which the group reassembled in South Carolina.

The 514th staged through Fort Lawton, Washington and the Caroline Islands before arriving on Okinawa. The unit performed same mission on Okinawa as it had in Italy. The group was awarded credit for participation in the Ryukus Campaign. It was disbanded in 1948.

=== Cold War ===
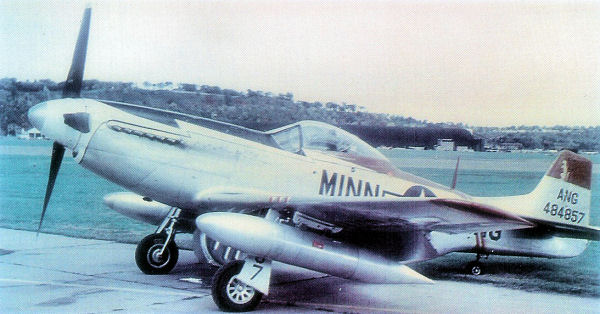
F-51D of the 109th Fighter-Interceptor Squadron (Note: Aircraft is North American F-51D-25-NT Mustang, serial 44-84857. When the 109th Fighter-Interceptor Squadron was returned to the Air National Guard in December 1952, its F-51 Mustangs were transferred to the 18th, which continued to fly them until equipping with Sabres in 1953. This Mustang was later transferred to the El Salvador Air Force.Baugher, Joe (19 January 2023). "1942 USAF Serial Numbers". Joe Baugher.)

The 514th was redesignated as an air defense group, reconstituted and activated at Minneapolis-St Paul International Airport in 1953. with responsibility for air defense from its base in the upper midwestern United States. The group was initially assigned the 18th Fighter-Interceptor Squadron, which was already stationed at Minneapolis-St Paul, where it flew World War II era North American F-51 Mustangs, as its operational component. The 18th had previously been assigned directly to the 31st Air Division. The group replaced the 72d Air Base Squadron as host active duty USAF unit at Minneapolis-St Paul Airport. It was assigned three squadrons to perform its support responsibilities.

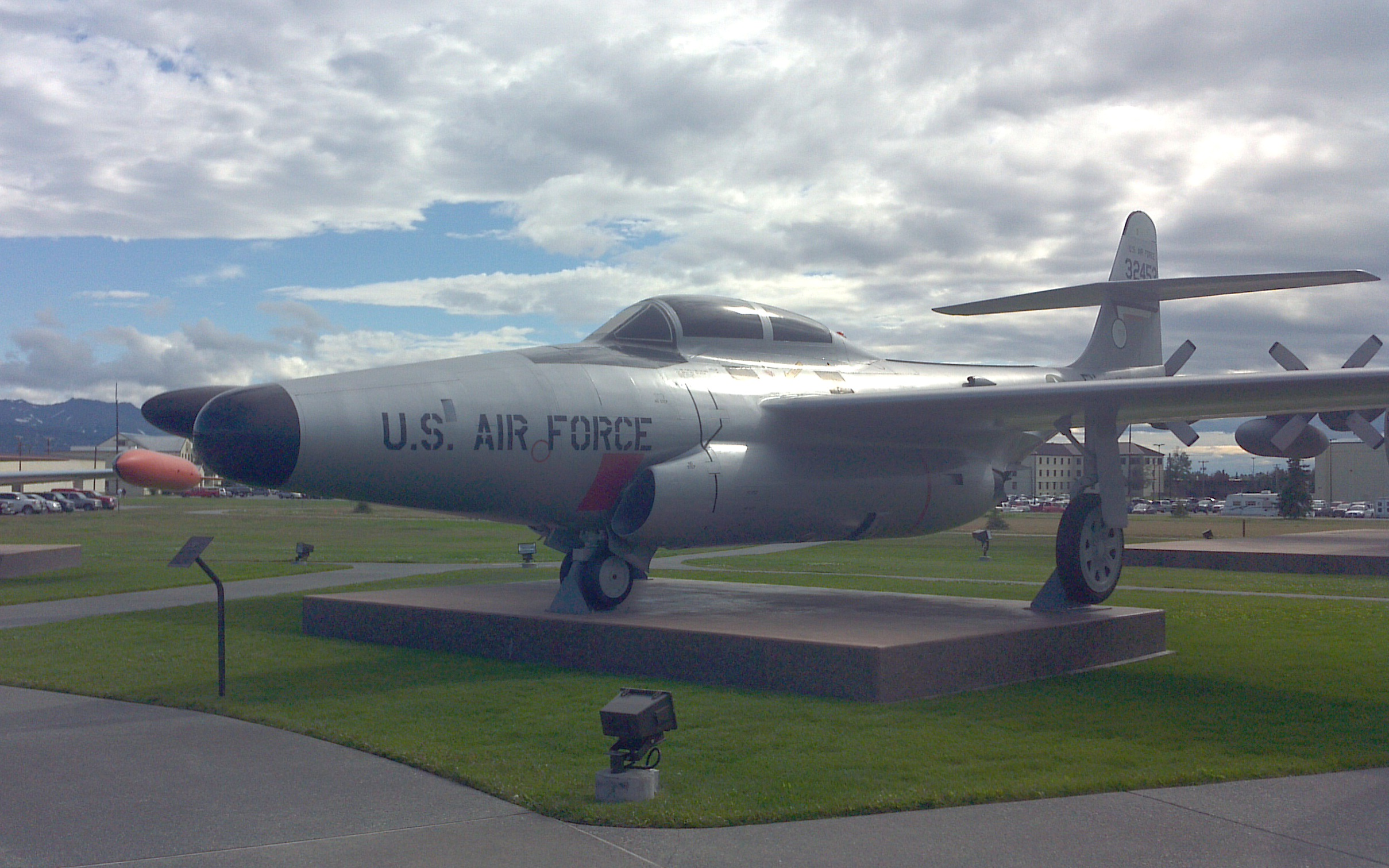
F-89D as flown by the 337th FIS

The 18th Squadron upgraded to North American F-86 Sabre jet fighters in July 1953, then to a later model F-86 in December. It finally replaced its F-86s with airborne intercept radar equipped and Mighty Mouse rocket armed Northrop F-89 Scorpions in January 1954. In September 1954, the 18th moved to Alaska and was reassigned. A second operational squadron, the 337th Fighter-Interceptor Squadron, had been activated and assigned to the group earlier in 1954. The 337th flew F-89s while assigned to the group. The group inactivated with its mission, personnel and equipment being transferred to the 475th Fighter Group (Air Defense) in 1955 as part of Air Defense Command's Project Arrow, which was designed to bring back on the active list the fighter units which had compiled memorable records in the two world wars. The group was disbanded once again in 1984.

== Lineage ==
- Constituted as 514th Air Service Group

Activated on 27 December 1944
Inactivated on 4 January 1946
Disbanded on 8 October 1948

- Reconstituted and redesignated 514th Air Defense Group on 21 January 1953

Activated on 18 February 1953
Inactivated on 18 August 1955
Disbanded on 27 September 1984

=== Assignments ===
- Unknown, 27 December 1944 – July 1945 (Note: Probably XV Air Force Service Command until January 1945.)
- VII Bomber Command, c. 3 July 1945 – 4 January 1946
- 31st Air Division, 16 February 1953 – 18 August 1955

=== Components ===
Operational Squadrons

- 18th Fighter-Interceptor Squadron, 18 February 1953 – 1 September 1954
- 337th Fighter-Interceptor Squadron, 8 July 1954 – 18 August 1955

Support Units

- 514th Air Base Squadron, 16 February 1953 – 18 August 1955
- 514th Materiel Squadron, 16 February 1953 – 18 August 1955
- 514th Medical Squadron (later 514th USAF Infirmary), 16 February 1953 – 18 August 1955
- 764th Air Materiel Squadron, 27 December 1944 – 4 January 1946
- 940th Air Engineering Squadron, 27 December 1944 – 4 January 1946

=== Stations ===
- Serragia Airfield, Corsica, France 27 December 1944
- Capodichino Airport, Naples, Italy, 8 January 1945 – 16 January 1945
- Bradley Field, Connecticut, c. 25 January 1945 – c. 25 January 1945
- Columbia Army Air Base, South Carolina, c. 25 February 1945 – 26 April 1945
- Fort Lawton, Washington, May 1945 – May 1945
- Kadena Air Base, Okinawa, July 1945
- Machinato Air Base, Okinawa, 3 July 1945 – 4 January 1946
- Minneapolis-St. Paul International Airport, Minnesota, 16 February 1953 – 18 August 1955

=== Aircraft ===
- North American F-51D Mustang 1953
- North American F-86A Sabre 1953
- North American F-86F Sabre 1953–1954
- Northrop F-89D Scorpion 1954–1955

=== Awards and campaigns ===
Campaign Streamer	Campaign	Dates	Notes
	Streamer without inscription	27 December 1944 – 16 January 1945	514th Air Service Group
	Ryukyus	July 1945-2 September 1945	514th Air Service Group

== See also ==
- List of United States Air Force Aerospace Defense Command Interceptor Squadrons
- List of F-86 Sabre units
- F-89 Scorpion units of the United States Air Force

== Notes ==
Explanatory notes

Citations

== Bibliography ==
- Buss, Lydus H.(ed), Sturm, Thomas A., Volan, Denys, and McMullen, Richard F., History of Continental Air Defense Command and Air Defense Command July to December 1955, Directorate of Historical Services, Air Defense Command, Ent AFB, CO, (1956)
- Coleman, John M (1950). The Development of Tactical Services in the Army Air Forces. New York, NY: Columbia University Press.
- Cornett, Lloyd H; Johnson, Mildred W (1980). A Handbook of Aerospace Defense Organization, 1946–1980 (PDF). Peterson AFB, CO: Office of History, Aerospace Defense Center. Archived from the original (PDF) on 13 February 2016.
- Maurer, Maurer, ed. (1983) [1961]. Air Force Combat Units of World War II (PDF) (reprint ed.). Washington, DC: Office of Air Force History. ISBN 0-912799-02-1. LCCN 61060979. Archived from the original (PDF) on 20 December 2016.
- Maurer, Maurer, ed. (1982) [1969]. Combat Squadrons of the Air Force, World War II (PDF) (reprint ed.). Washington, DC: Office of Air Force History. ISBN 0-405-12194-6. LCCN 70605402. OCLC 72556. Archived from the original (PDF) on 20 December 2016.
- "AF Pamphlet 900-2, Unit Decorations, Awards and Campaign Participation Credits" (PDF). Washington, DC: Department of the Air Force. 15 June 1971. Archived from the original (PDF) on 4 August 2015.
