= 517th Air Defense Group =

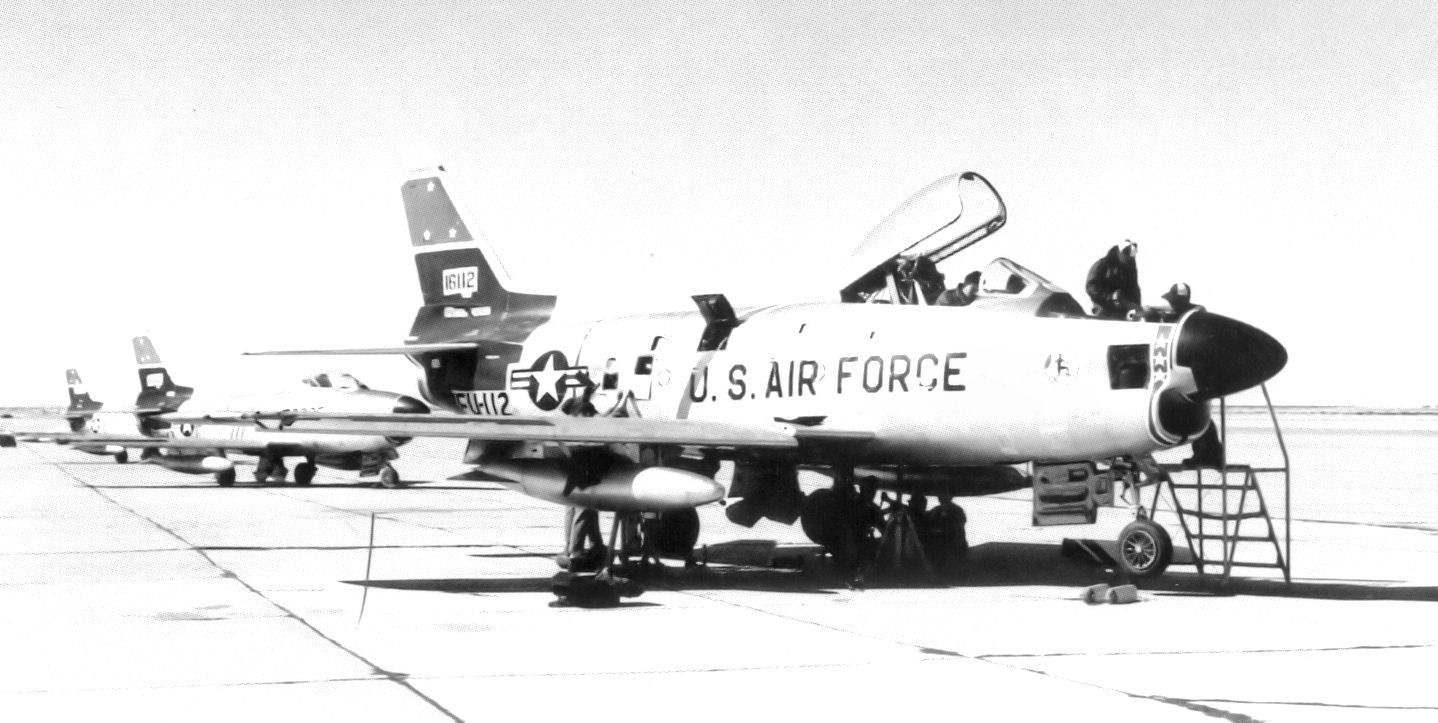
- 37th Fighter-Interceptor Squadron North American F-86D Sabre at Ethan Allen AFB
- Active: 1945; 1953–1955
- Country: United States
- Branch: United States Air Force
- Role: Air defense

The 517th Air Defense Group is a disbanded United States Air Force organization. Its last assignment was with the 4711th Air Defense Wing at Ethan Allen Air Force Base, Vermont. It was inactivated on 18 August 1955.

The group was originally activated as a support unit for a bombardment group at the end of World War II in Italy and then redeployed to the Caribbean, where it supported units redeploying from Europe until it was inactivated in 1945.

The group was activated once again in 1953, when ADC established it as the headquarters for a dispersed fighter-interceptor squadron and the medical, maintenance, and administrative squadrons supporting it. It was replaced in 1955 when ADC transferred its mission, equipment, and personnel to the 14th Fighter Group in a project that replaced air defense groups commanding fighter squadrons with fighter groups with distinguished records during World War II.

== History ==
=== World War II ===
The group was activated as the 517th Air Service Group in Italy in early 1945, shortly before the end of World War II. It was split from the 323rd Service Group when the Army Air Forces (AAF) replaced Service Groups that included personnel from other branches of the Army and supported two combat groups with Air Service Groups that included only Air Corps units. It was designed to support a single combat group - "scheduled to be" the 464th Bombardment Group. Its 943rd Air Engineering Squadron was to provide maintenance that was beyond the capability of the combat group, its 767th Air Materiel Squadron to handle all supply matters, and its Headquarters & Base Services Squadron to provide other support. Together with the 518th Air Service Group, it supported the 464th and 465th Bombardment Groups at Pantanella Airfield (the unit histories are contradictory concerning whether the 517th supported the 464th or 465th group). The group relocated to Trinidad and provided support to combat units redeploying from Europe to the United States. It was disbanded in 1948.

=== Cold War ===
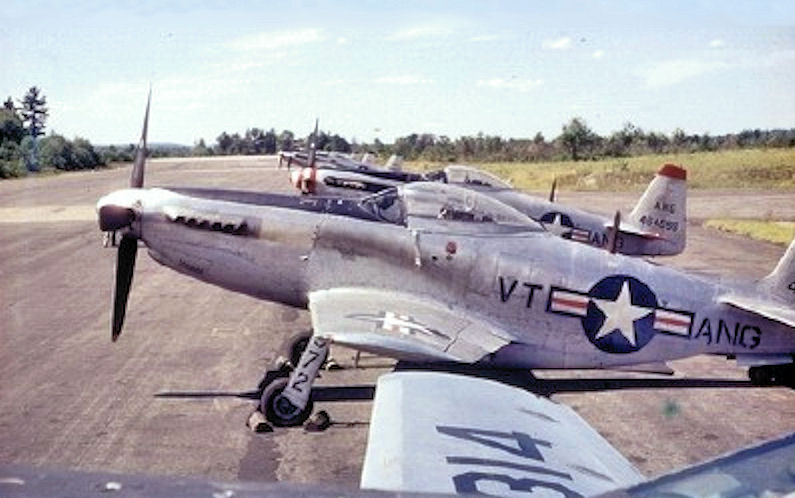
134th Fighter Squadron F-51H Mustangs (Note: The F-51s of the 134th FIS were transferred to the 37th FIS when the 134th was returned to the control of the Air National Guard on 1 November 1952. The 37th FIS continued to fly them until it equipped with Sabres in 1953.)

During the Cold War, the group was reconstituted, redesignated as the 517th Air Defense Group, and activated at Ethan Allan AFB in 1953 with responsibility for air defense of upper New England. It was assigned the 37th Fighter-Interceptor Squadron (FIS), which was already stationed at Ethan Allan AFB, and flying World War II era F-51 Mustangs as its operational component. The 37th FIS had been assigned directly to the 4711th Defense Wing. The group replaced the 75th Air Base Squadron as USAF host organization at the base. It was assigned three squadrons to perform its support responsibilities.

The 37th FIS converted to airborne intercept radar equipped and Mighty Mouse rocket armed North American F-86 Sabres in June 1953. The group was inactivated in 1955 and replaced by the 14th Fighter Group (Air Defense) as result of Air Defense Command's Project Arrow, which was designed to bring back on the active list the fighter units which had compiled memorable records in the two world wars. The group was disbanded once again in 1984.

== Lineage ==
- Constituted as 517th Air Service Group

Activated on 13 January 1945
Inactivated on 31 July 1945
Disbanded on 8 October 1948

- Reconstituted and redesignated 517th Air Defense Group on 21 January 1953

Activated on 16 February 1953
Inactivated on 18 August 1955
Disbanded on 27 September 1984

=== Assignments ===
- XII Air Force Service Command, 13 January 1945 – c.. 27 May 1945
- Caribbean Wing, Air Transport Command c. 6 June 1945 – 31 July 1945
- 4711th Defense Wing, (later 4711th Air Defense Wing), 16 February 1953 – 18 August 1955

=== Stations ===
- Caserta, Italy 13 January 1945 – 1945
- Pantanella Airfield, Italy 1945 – 27 May 1945
- Waller Field, Trinidad 16 June 1945 – 31 July 1945
- Ethan Allen AFB, Vermont, 16 February 1953 – 18 August 1955

=== Components ===
Operational Squadron

- 37th Fighter-Interceptor Squadron, 16 February 1953 – 18 August 1955

Support Units

- 517th Air Base Squadron, 16 February 1953 – 18 August 1955
- 517th Materiel Squadron, 16 February 1953 – 18 August 1955
- 517th Medical Squadron (later 517th USAF Infirmary), 16 February 1953 – 18 August 1955
- 767th Air Materiel Squadron 13 January 1945 – 31 July 1945
- 943rd Air Engineering Squadron 13 January 1945 – 31 July 1945

=== Aircraft ===
- F-51D, 1953
- F-86D, 1953–1955

=== Commanders ===
- Maj. William C. Richardson, c.. 13 Jan 1945 – c.. Feb 1945
- Lt Col. Lloyd L. Connell, c.. Feb 1945 – after 15 Jun 1945
- Unknown 16 Feb 1953–18 Aug 1955

== See also ==
- List of United States Air Force Aerospace Defense Command Interceptor Squadrons
- List of F-86 Sabre units
