= 4711th Air Defense Wing =

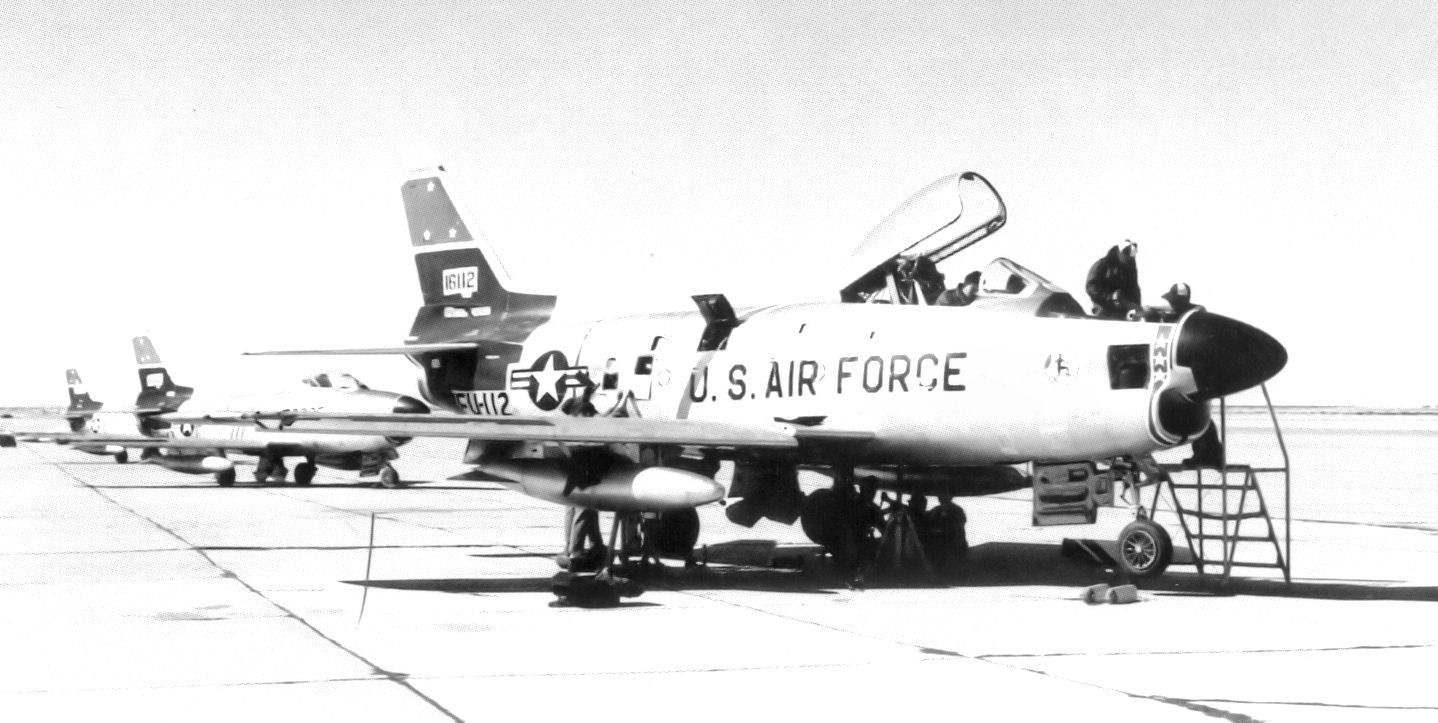
- F-86Ds of the wing's 37th Fighter-Interceptor Squadron in 1955
- Active: 1952–1956
- Country: United States
- Branch: United States Air Force
- Type: Fighter interceptor and radar headquarters
- Role: Air defense
- Motto: Tigris in Caelo (Latin for 'Tiger in the Sky')

Insignia
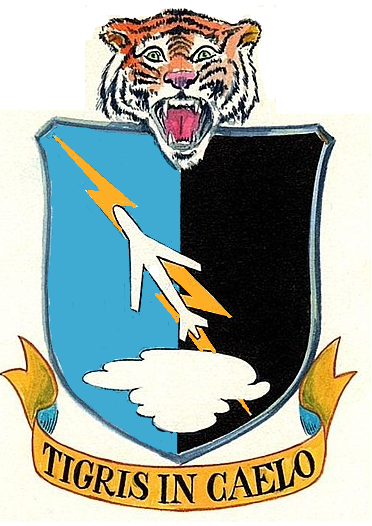
- 4711th Air Defense Wing emblem

The 4711th Air Defense Wing is a discontinued United States Air Force organization. Its last assignment was with the 30th Air Division of Air Defense Command (ADC) at Selfridge Air Force Base, Michigan, where it was discontinued in 1956. It was established in 1952 at Presque Isle Air Force Base, Maine as the 4711th Defense Wing in a general reorganization of ADC, which replaced wings responsible for a base with wings responsible for a geographical area.

It assumed control of several fighter interceptor squadrons that had been assigned to the 23d Fighter-Interceptor Wing, including two Air National Guard squadrons mobilized for the Korean War. In early 1953 it also was assigned six radar squadrons in Maine, Vermont, and New York and its dispersed fighter squadrons combined with colocated air base squadrons into air defense groups. The wing was redesignated as an air defense wing in 1954. In 1956, as ADC prepared to implement the Semi-Automatic Ground Environment (SAGE) air defense system, the wing lost its combat components and moved to Selfridge, where it was discontinued.

== History ==
The wing was organized as the 4711th Defense Wing at the beginning of February 1952 at Presque Isle Air Force Base, Maine as part of a major reorganization of ADC responding to ADC's difficulty under the existing wing base organizational structure in deploying fighter squadrons to best advantage. The wing assumed operational control and the air defense mission of fighter squadrons formerly assigned to the inactivating 23d Fighter-Interceptor Wing. The 74th and 75th Fighter-Interceptor Squadrons, flying North American F-86 Sabre aircraft were at Presque Isle, while the 101st Fighter-Interceptor Wing's 132d Fighter-Interceptor Squadron, flying Lockheed F-80 Shooting Stars was at Dow Air Force Base, Maine, and the 134th Fighter-Interceptor Squadron, flying World War II era North American F-51 Mustangs was at Burlington Municipal Airport, Vermont. The two dispersed squadrons were federalized Air National Guard (ANG) squadrons that had been attached to the 23rd Wing. The 27th Fighter-Interceptor Squadron at Griffiss Air Force Base, another F-86 squadron, was transferred to the wing from direct assignment to Eastern Air Defense Force. The support elements of the 23rd Wing's 23rd Air Base Group and 23rd Maintenance & Supply Group were replaced at Presque Isle by an air base squadron and air base squadrons were activated at Presque Isle and Burlington to support the fighter squadrons at those bases. The wing's mission was to train and maintain tactical units in a state of readiness to intercept and destroy enemy aircraft attempting to penetrate the air defense system in the Northeastern United States.

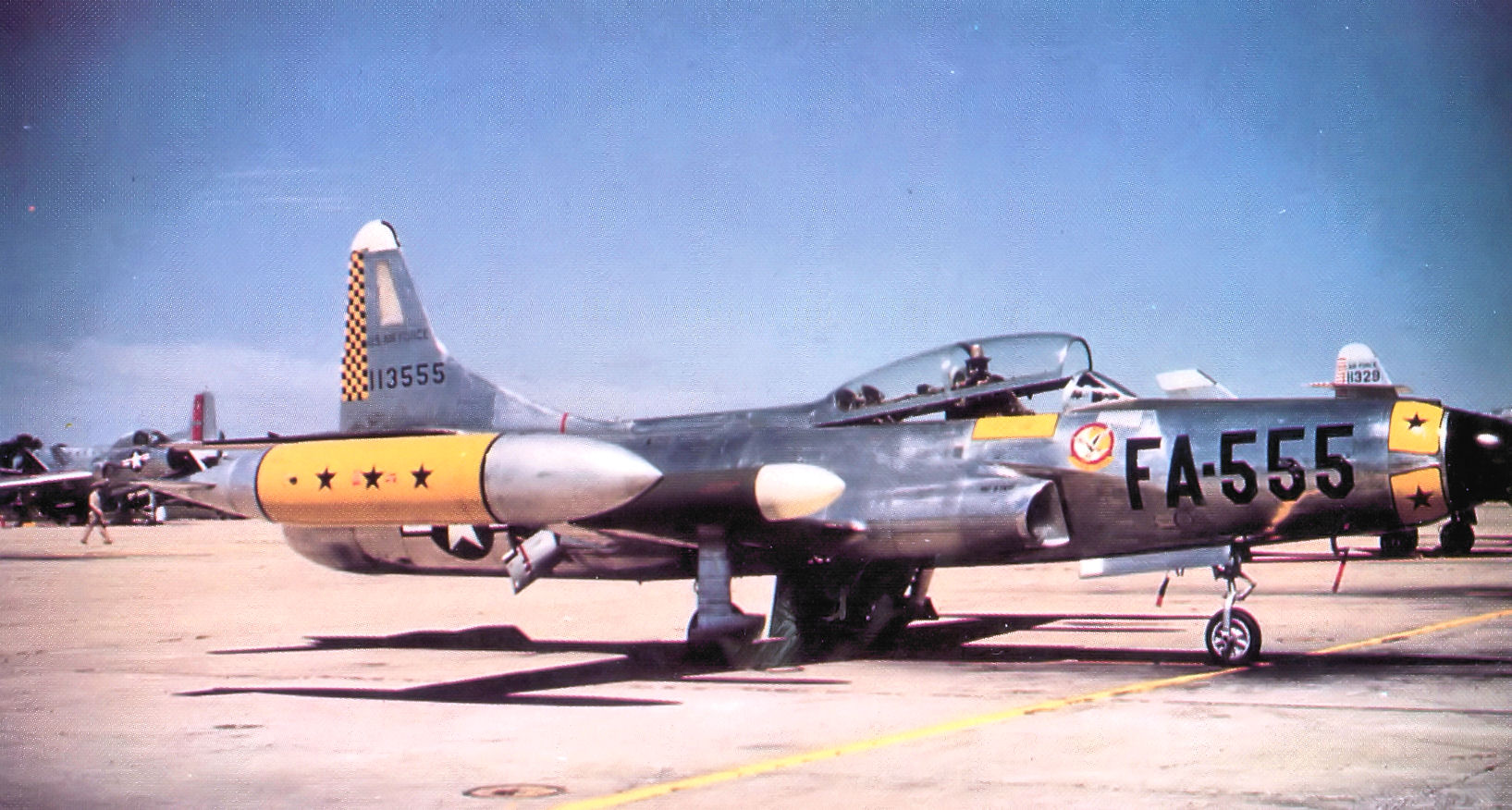
27th FIS F-94C Starfire (Note: Aircraft is Lockheed F-94C-1-LO Starfire, serial 51-13555 and was the squadron commander's aircraft. Taken in 1955. This aircraft was later used by the Air National Guard and was on display at Mechanicsburg, Pennsylvania.)

In June, the 74th converted to Northrop F-89 Scorpion interceptor aircraft, but by fall its F-89Cs had been grounded and the squadron was forced to convert to Lockheed F-94 Starfires. In November 1952, the wing's two ANG fighter squadrons were returned to the control of their states and replaced by the 37th Fighter-Interceptor Squadron at Ethan Allen and the 49th Fighter-Interceptor Squadron at Dow.

In February 1953, another major reorganization of ADC activated air defense groups at ADC bases with dispersed fighter squadrons. Two groups were assigned to the wing and assumed direct control of the fighter squadrons, as well as support squadrons to carry out their role as the USAF host organizations at their bases. As a result of this reorganization, the 528th Air Defense Group activated at Presque Isle and assumed control of the fighter squadrons there, while the 517th Air Defense Group activated to command the squadron at Ethan Allen AFB. The reorganization also resulted in the wing adding the radar detection, control and warning mission, and it was assigned six aircraft control & warning squadrons (AC&W Sq) to perform this mission. The 49th FIS traded in its F-80s for F-86s in the same month. Meanwhile, the 75th FIS moved to Suffolk County Air Force Base in October and was reassigned to another wing.

In 1954, two of the wing's squadrons upgraded to radar equipped and rocket armed fighters. The 49th received later model F-86D Sabres, while the 27th converted to F-94C Starfires.

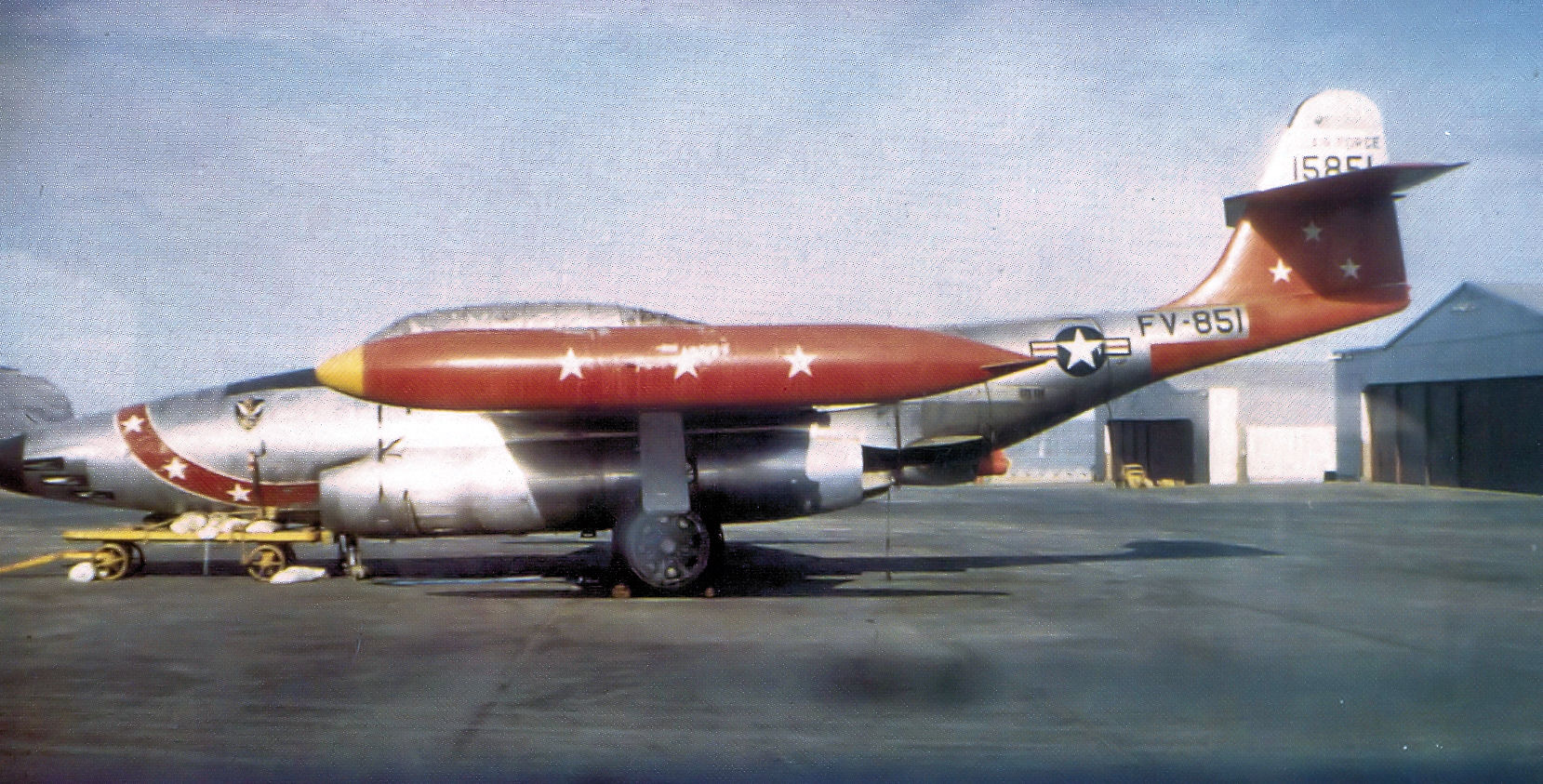
74th Fighter-Interceptor Squadron F-89C Scorpion (Note: Aircraft is Northrop F-89C-40-NO Scorpion, serial 51-5851.)

In 1955, ADC implemented Project Arrow, which was designed to bring back on the active list the fighter units that had compiled memorable records in the two world wars. As a result of Project Arrow, the 23d Fighter Group (Air Defense), replaced the 528th Air Defense Group at Presque Isle, while the 14th Fighter Group replaced the 517th Air Defense Group at Ethan Allen. In October, a second F-89 squadron, the 465th Fighter-Interceptor Squadron, activated at Griffiss.

In preparation for the implementation of the Semi-Automatic Ground Environment air defense system, the 4711th Wing lost its operational units in March 1956 and moved to Selfridge Air Force Base, where it was discontinued shortly thereafter.

== Lineage ==
- Designated as the 4711th Defense Wing and organized on 1 February 1952

Redesignated as the 4711th Air Defense Wing on 1 September 1954
Discontinued on 8 July 1956

=== Assignments ===
- Eastern Air Defense Force, 1 February 1952
- 32nd Air Division, 16 February 1953
- 30th Air Division, 1 March 1956 – 18 October 1956

=== Components ===
==== Groups ====
Fighter Groups

- 14th Fighter Group (Air Defense), 18 August 1955 – 1 March 1956

Ethan Allen Air Force Base, Vermont

- 23d Fighter Group (Air Defense), 18 August 1955 – 1 March 1956 (Note: Subordinate units were stationed with wing headquarters, except as noted.)

Air Defense Groups

- 517th Air Defense Group, 16 February 1953 – 18 August 1955

Ethan Allen Air Force Base, Vermont

- 528th Air Defense Group, 16 February 1953 – 18 August 1955

Presque Isle Air Force Base, Maine

==== Squadrons ====
Fighter Squadrons

- 27th Fighter-Interceptor Squadron, 6 February 1952 – 1 March 1956

Griffiss Air Force Base, New York

- 37th Fighter-Interceptor Squadron, 1 November 1952 – 16 February 1953

Ethan Allen Air Force Base, Vermont

- 49th Fighter-Interceptor Squadron, 1 November 1952 – 5 November 1955

Dow Air Force Base, Maine

- 74th Fighter-Interceptor Squadron, 6 February 1952 – 16 February 1953
- 75th Fighter-Interceptor Squadron, 6 February 1952 – 16 October 1952
- 132d Fighter-Interceptor Squadronv, 6 February 1952 – 1 November 1952

Dow Air Force Base, Maine

- 134th Fighter-Interceptor Squadron, 6 February 1952 – 1 November 1952

Burlington Municipal Airport (later Ethan Allen Air Force Base), Vermont

- 465th Fighter-Interceptor Squadron, 8 October 1955 – 1 March 1956

Griffiss Air Force Base, New York

Support Squadrons

- 75th Air Base Squadron

Burlington Municipal Airport (later Ethan Allen Air Force Base), 1 February 1952 – 16 February 1953

- 85th Air Base Squadron, 1 February 1952 – 16 February 1953

Radar Squadrons

- 127th Aircraft Control & Warning Squadron, 16 February 1953 – 1 September 1953

Fort Williams, Maine

- 128th Aircraft Control & Warning Squadron, 16 February 1953 – 1 September 1953

Dow Air Force Base, Maine

- 655th Aircraft Control & Warning Squadron, 16 February 1953 – 1 March 1956

Watertown Air Force Station, New York

- 677th Aircraft Control & Warning Squadron, 1 September 1953 – May 1954

Fort Williams Air Force Station, Maine

- 679th Aircraft Control & Warning Squadron, 1 September 1953 – December 1953

Dow Air Force Base, Maine

- 764th Aircraft Control & Warning Squadron, 16 February 1953 – 1 March 1956

Bellevue Hill (later Saint Albans Air Force Station), Vermont

- 765th Aircraft Control & Warning Squadron, 16 February 1953 – 1 March 1956

Charleston Air Force Station, Maine

- 766th Aircraft Control & Warning Squadron, 16 February 1953 – 1 March 1956

Caswell Air Force Station, Maine

- 792d Aircraft Control & Warning Squadron, 1 November 1953 – December 1953

Ethan Allen Air Force Base, Vermont

- 907th Aircraft Control & Warning Squadron, November 1954 – 1 March 1956

Syracuse Air Force Station, New York until February 1955, then Bucks Harbor Air Force Station, Maine

- 911th Aircraft Control & Warning Squadron, June 1955 – 1 March 1956

Syracuse Air Force Station, New York

=== Stations ===
- Presque Isle Air Force Base, Maine, 1 February 1952
- Selfridge Air Force Base, Michigan, 1 March – 8 July 1956

=== Aircraft ===
- North American F-51D Mustang, 1952–1953
- Lockheed F-80C Shooting Star, 1952
- North American F-86A Sabre, 1952
- North American F-86D Sabre, 1953–1956
- North American F-86F Sabre, 1953–1954
- Northrop F-89C Scorpion, 1952, 1953–1954
- Northrop F-89D Scorpion, 1954–1956
- Lockheed F-94B Starfire, 1952–1953
- Lockheed F-94C Starfire, 1954–1956

=== Commanders ===
- Col. Charles H. McDonald, 1 February 1952 – after March 1952
- Col. Norvel K. Heath, by July 1952 – 1952
- Col. James O. Beckwith, 1952 – unknown

== See also ==
- List of MAJCOM wings of the United States Air Force
- List of United States Air Force Aerospace Defense Command Interceptor Squadrons
- List of United States Air Force aircraft control and warning squadrons
