= Presque Isle Air Force Base =

Installations of the US Air Force in Maine

Presque Isle Air Force Base was a military installation of the United States Air Force located near Presque Isle, Maine. In the late 1950s and early 1960s it became a base for Strategic Air Command.

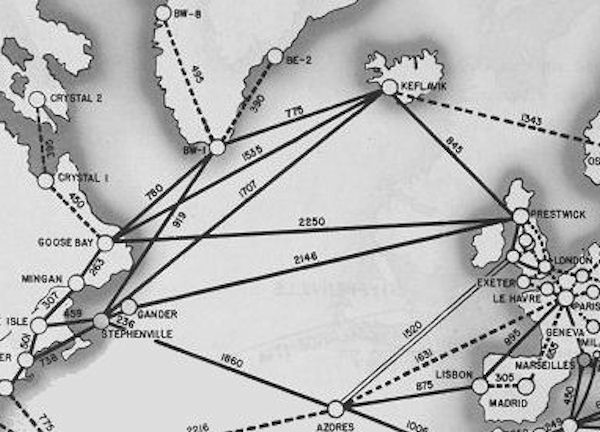
North Atlantic Transport Route 1945

The original airport was constructed in 1930 by the Civilian Conservation Corps as a commercial airport located 1.5 miles (2.4 km) west of the "business center". In 1941, the federal government appropriated the local airport, establishing Presque Isle Army Airfield for planes bound to and from Great Britain. It was activated as an Army Air Corps field on 15 September 1941. The main Army Air Force unit at Presque Isle was the 23d AAF Ferrying Wing, assigned to the Air Transport Command. It was closed after the war ended

The airfield was reactivated by the United States Air Force and redesignated Presque Isle Air Force Base on January 12, 1948, assigned to the Air Defense Command (ADC) Eastern Air Defense Force.

The 23rd Fighter Group was redesignated as the 23rd Fighter-Interceptor Group, and activated on 12 January 1951. It was assigned to the 23rd Fighter-Interceptor Wing at Presque Isle AFB as part of ADC, with the 74th and 75th Fighter-Interceptor Squadrons, flying North American F-86E Sabre aircraft. Before the year was over, both squadrons had converted to older F-86As. In February 1952, the wing and group were inactivated, in a major ADC reorganization.

Parts of the former base were redeveloped as a civilian airport, known today as Presque Isle International Airport.

== Snark missile launch complex ==
Presque Isle AFB became the site for the only operational launch complex for the Northrop SM-62 Snark Intercontinental Cruise Missile (ICM). Adjacent to the base, its coordinates were 46°42′17″N 68°2′28″W

"Operational Snark Launching Site I" was selected by the SAC Strategic Missile Site Selection Panel on 21 March 1957, land for the "new base [with] 740 men" was acquired in January 1958, and construction of the $12,000,000 base began in May 1958 by the J.R. Cianchete Construction Company.

The 702d Strategic Missile Wing was activated on 1 January 1959, and the first Douglas C-124 Globemaster II with a Snark arrived on 27 May 1959. The complex had 6 corrugated hangars ("missile assembly and maintenance buildings") each of 420 ft × 80 ft (128 m × 24 m) with 2 fixed outdoor launch pads. For each launch pad with diameter 160 ft (49 m), a missile was stored within the building on a launcher trailer attached to a tow vehicle, 1 at ready storage to launch from the outdoor pad within 15 minutes and behind it, 1 capable of launch in 30 minutes. Each building had 3 additional missiles in line behind the first wave (readiness of 4 hr, 3 days, and 5 days), and the missile launch control center was a hangar balcony. In addition to the hangars and pads, the complex included "a jet engine run-up building, the warhead maintenance and inspection building, missile maintenance and guidance lab", a dormitory for night alert personnel, and a compressor house for each hangar.

External image
- row of hangars when new
- map of complex with dimensions
- modern hangar photo

First alert status was 18 March 1960, and 30 missiles were available in December with 4 on alert. After the 702d SMW was declared operational on 28 February 1961, 20 Snarks were on alert in the summer of 1961, and on 25 June 1961 the wing was inactivated following President Kennedy's earlier announcement for "73 military establishments" to be closed (Congress was informed on 30 March.)

== Civilian use after base closure ==
The Snark Missile Launch Complex was purchased by the city of Presque Isle, Maine, in early 1962 for $56,000 (the city also bought "other parts of the former Presque Isle Air Force Base, ...known as the Skyway Industrial Park" in 1962) and some of the remaining AFB area was redesignated "Presque Isle Air National Guard Facility". Four of the hangars were used for woodworking in 1962 and in 1995, one was used as a flax mill.

The former launch complex now has the designation Environmental site ME500.

Parts of the former base were redeveloped as Presque Isle International Airport, making Presque Isle a civilian airfield again. As of 2020 it offers scheduled jet passenger service to Newark and Washington-Dulles, in addition to serving as a cargo airport.

Northern Maine Community College was founded in 1961 on the former air base grounds. The Skyway Industrial Park was created in the vicinity of the airport.

== See also ==
- Holloman Air Force Base § Missile testing sites (Snark testing sites)
- List of Cape Canaveral and Merritt Island launch sites
