= Erik A. Peterson =

American general

Erik A. Peterson is a Brigadier General in the United States Air Force and the Deputy Adjutant General for Air of the Wisconsin National Guard.

== Career ==
Erik A. Peterson was commissioned as an officer in the U.S. Air Force in 1991. He underwent further training with the 97th Flying Training Squadron before being stationed at Luke Air Force Base. For part of his time at Luke, Peterson was assigned to the 310th Fighter Squadron.

Afterward, Peterson was an F-16 Fighting Falcon training officer with the 18th Fighter Squadron and instructor with the 34th Fighter Squadron. In 2001, he joined the Wisconsin Air National Guard and was assigned to the 176th Fighter Squadron, eventually being its Commanding Officer.

Peterson's ensuing roles included assuming command of the 115th Operations Group and the 115th Fighter Wing. In 2020, he was named as the Chief of Staff of the Wisconsin Air National Guard. Later, Peterson was appointed as Deputy Adjutant General on an interim basis.

Decorations Peters has received include the Legion of Merit with two oak leaf clusters, the Meritorious Service Medal with three oak leaf clusters, the Air Medal with oak leaf cluster and the Air Force Commendation Medal with two oak leaf clusters.

== Education ==
- United States Air Force Academy
- Squadron Officer School
- Embry-Riddle Aeronautical University
- USAF Air War College
- Joint Forces Staff College, National Defense University
