= Eastern Air Defense Sector =

US Air Force unit

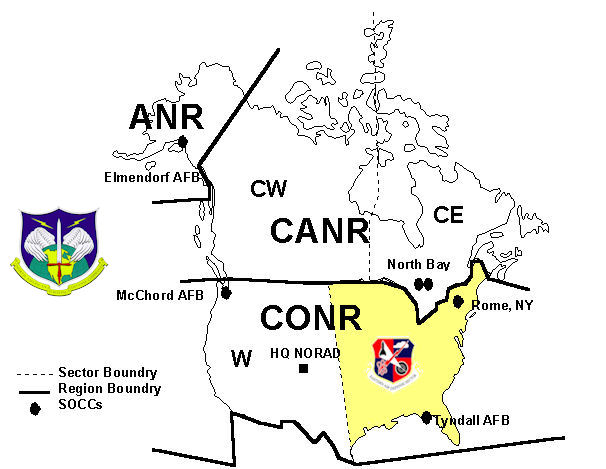
- Eastern Air Defense Sector Area of Responsibility
- Active: 1 April 1956 – 1 April 1966; 1 July 1987 – present
- Branch: United States Air Force
- Type: Joint bi-national unit
- Role: Air defense command and control
- Size: ≈ 400 personnel
- Part of: New York Air National Guard and First Air Force (Air Forces Northern)
- Garrison/HQ: Griffiss Business and Technology Park, Rome, New York
- Decorations: Air Force Outstanding Unit Award; Air Force Organizational Excellence Award
- Website: Official website

Commanders
- Current commander: Colonel Joseph F. Roos

Insignia
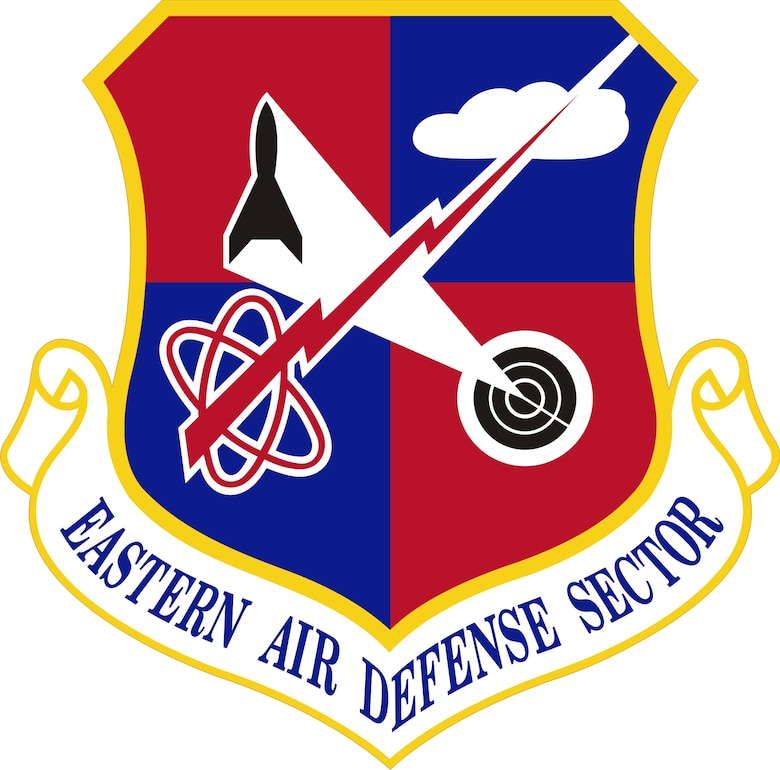
- Eastern Air Defense Sector emblem (Note: Approved 5 April 1957. Description: A shield quartered, 1st and 4th quarters red, a missile in the 1st quarter, in pale, black, superimposed over a protruding beam white, radiating bendwise from a radar scope centered in the 4th quarter, the radar scope white, with black circular rings and a white finder; 2d and 3d quarters blue, 2d quarter a cloud white; 3d quarter a nuclear symbol white and red; over all in bend sinister a lightning bolt red, fimbriated white. Significance: The emblem symbolizes the sector's Air Force mission. The lightning bolt and cloud symbolize all-weather operations. The radar scope and protruding beam indicates continual surveillance and future development in the field of electronics. The missile is indicative of current and future air defense weapons -- both guided missiles and jet aircraft. The abstract circles symbolize the integration of the sector into Air Defense operations and future developments in nuclear and thermonuclear fields.)

The Eastern Air Defense Sector (EADS) is a United States Air Force unit of Air Combat Command (ACC), permanently assigned to the North American Aerospace Defense Command (NORAD). A joint, bi-national military organization, EADS is composed of US and Canadian military forces, federal civilians and contractors. It is located at the Griffiss Business and Technology Park in Rome, New York, the former Griffiss Air Force Base. EADS is a subordinate command of the First Air Force and Continental NORAD Region, located at Tyndall Air Force Base in Florida.

Its mission is to counter all air threats to EADS' assigned Area of Operations through vigilant detection, rapid warning and precise tactical control of NORAD and NORTHCOM forces.

== Mission and operations ==
The Eastern Air Defense Sector (EADS) is an Air Combat Command (ACC) unit permanently assigned to the North American Aerospace Defense Command (NORAD). A joint bi-national for military organization, EADS is composed of US and Canadian military forces, federal civilians and contractors.

The unit is located at the Griffiss Business and Technology Park in Rome, New York. It is a subordinate to the First Air Force (Air Forces Northern) and Continental NORAD Region, both located at Tyndall Air Force Base in Florida.

The Air National Guard (ANG) provides the majority of the forces for the NORAD mission. At EADS, this responsibility belongs to the New York Air National Guard's 224th Air Defense Group. The 224th ADG consists of the 224th Air Defense Squadron, the 224th Support Squadron and two detachments in the Washington, D.C. area.

- Detachment 1 serves at the Joint Air Defense Operations Center (JADOC) at Joint Base Anacostia-Bolling in Washington, D.C. Commanded by US Army National Guard air defense units that serve year-long rotations, the JADOC is responsible for the National Capital Region's Integrated Air Defense System (IADS). Detachment 1, composed of New York ANG members, is the permanent Air Force component at the JADOC.
- Detachment 2 serves at the National Capital Region Coordination Center (NCRCC) in Herndon, Virginia. Operated by the Transportation Security Administration, the NCRCC is a fusion center that enables the federal agencies responsible for defending the NCR airspace to share information in real time. The New York ANG members at Detachment 2 are responsible for correlating, coordinating and rapidly sharing threat information with EADS Battle Control Center in Rome.

EADS has more than 400 full- and part-time military and civilian personnel. This includes a Canadian Forces detachment and US Army, US Navy, US Coast Guard and Federal Aviation Administration liaison officers. These personnel work side-by-side with the 224th ADG and are fully integrated into the unit.

The EADS is one of two sectors responsible for the air defense of the continental United States, the other being the Western Air Defense Sector (WADS) located at Joint Base Lewis-McChord in Washington state.

== Assigned units ==
The Eastern Air Defense Sector has operational command and control over the following Air National Guard fighter units. All units are gained by Air Combat Command when federally activated.

Alabama Air National Guard

- 187th Fighter Wing
  - 100th Fighter Squadron "Snakes" – F-35A Lightning II (Montgomery Air National Guard Base)

District of Columbia Air National Guard

- 113th Wing
  - 121st Fighter Squadron "Capitol Guardians" – F-16C/D (Joint Base Andrews, Maryland)

Florida Air National Guard

- 125th Fighter Wing
  - 159th Fighter Squadron "Gators" – F-15C/D (Jacksonville Air National Guard Base)
  - 159th Fighter Squadron (Detachment 1) – F-15C/D (Homestead Air Reserve Base)

Louisiana Air National Guard

- 159th Fighter Wing
  - 122nd Fighter Squadron "Bayou Militia" – F-15C/D (Naval Air Station Joint Reserve Base New Orleans)

Massachusetts Air National Guard

- 104th Fighter Wing
  - 131st Fighter Squadron "Death Viper" – F-15C/D (Barnes Air National Guard Base)

Minnesota Air National Guard

- 148th Fighter Wing
  - 179th Fighter Squadron "Bulldogs" – F-16CM/DM (Duluth Air National Guard Base)
  - 179th Fighter Squadron (Detachment 1) – F-16CM/DM (Tyndall Air Force Base, Florida)

New Jersey Air National Guard

- 177th Fighter Wing
  - 119th Fighter Squadron "Jersey Devils" – F-16C/D (Atlantic City Air National Guard Base)

Ohio Air National Guard

- 180th Fighter Wing
  - 112th Fighter Squadron "Stingers" – F-16CM/DM (Toledo Air National Guard Base)

South Carolina Air National Guard

- 169th Fighter Wing
  - 157th Fighter Squadron "Swamp Foxes" – F-16CM/DM (McEntire Joint National Guard Base)

Vermont Air National Guard

- 158th Fighter Wing
  - 134th Fighter Squadron "Green Mountain Boys" – F-35A Lightning II (Burlington ANG Base)
  - 134th Fighter Squadron (Detachment 1) – F-16C/D (Langley Air Force Base, Virginia)

Virginia Air National Guard

- 192nd Fighter Wing
  - 149th Fighter Squadron – F-22A (Langley Air Force Base)

Wisconsin Air National Guard

- 115th Fighter Wing
  - 176th Fighter Squadron "Badgers" – F-35A Lightning II (Truax Field Air National Guard Base)

== History ==
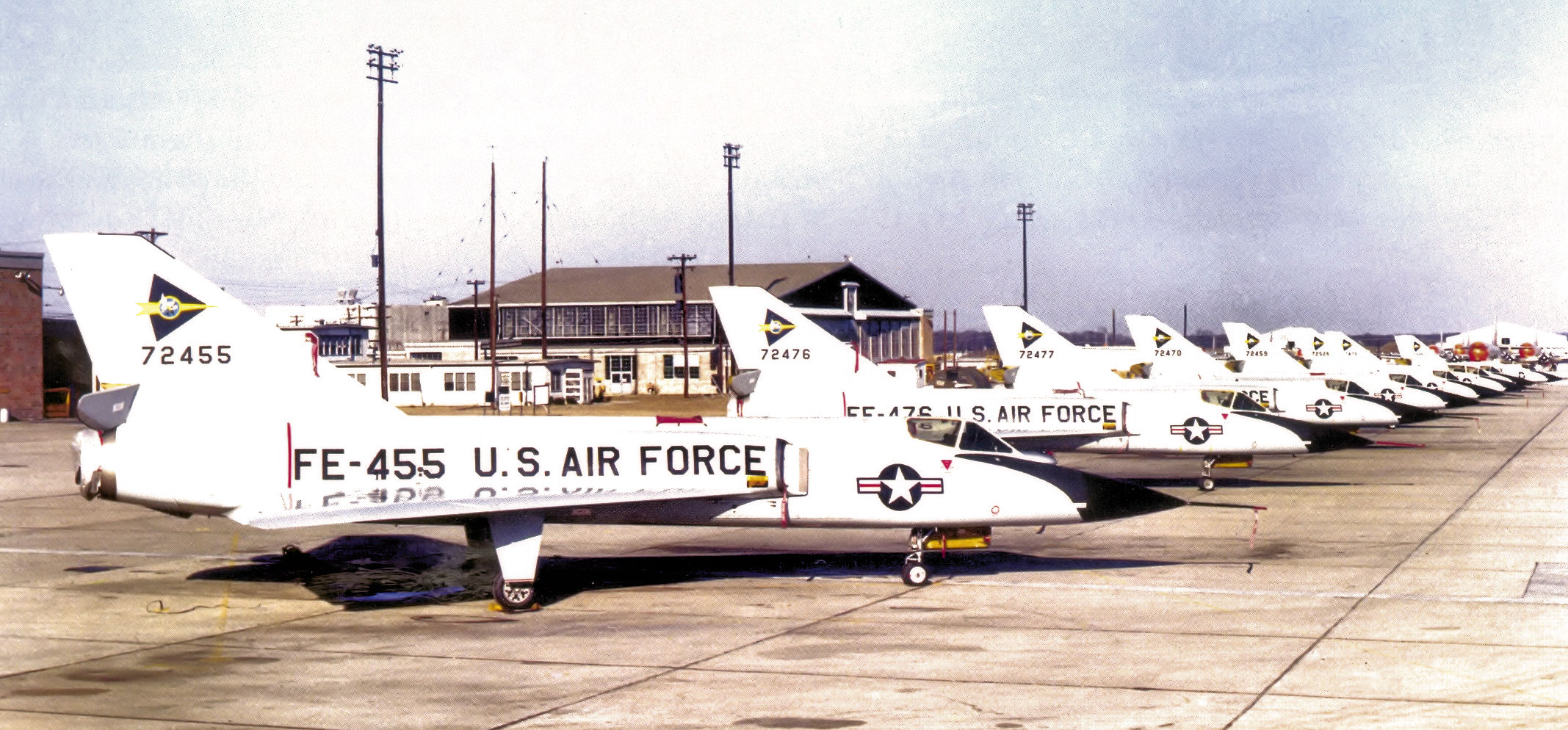
539th Fighter-Interceptor Squadron Convair F-106A-64-CO Delta Darts McGuire AFB, New Jersey October 1959

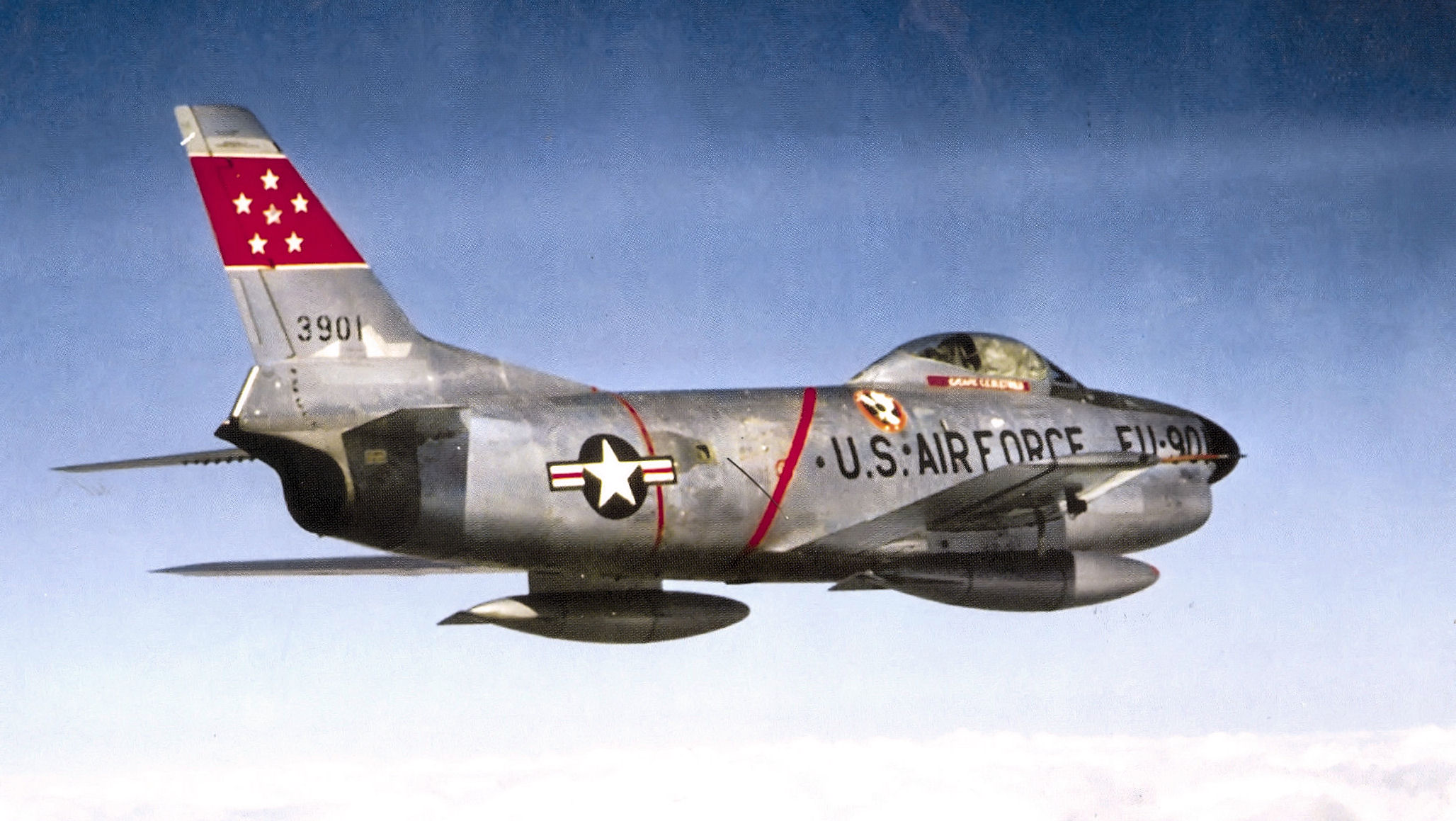
332d Fighter-Interceptor Squadron North American F-86D-45-NA Sabre 52–3901, 4709th Air Defense Wing, McGuire AFB, New Jersey, 1956

=== Cold War ===
The sector's history begins on 1 April 1956 when the 4621st Air Defense Wing was organized. The sector's predecessors, the 4709th Defense Wing (later 4709th Air Defense Wing) and the 52d Fighter-Interceptor Wing had performed the air defense mission at McGuire Air Force Base, New Jersey since 1949.

The wing operated a Manual Air Direction Center (MDC) at Roslyn AFS, New York. It was redesignated as the New York Air Defense Sector (NYADS) on 1 October. The sector's mission was to train and maintain tactical flying units in state of readiness in order to defend Northeast United States while initially continuing to operate the MDC.

In 1958, in response to the threat of long-range Soviet bombers, the U.S. and Canada signed a treaty creating the bi-national North American Air Defense Command (NORAD), responsible for both countries’ air defense and air sovereignty. Air Defense Sectors were established soon after, including the New York Air Defense Sector (NYADS) headquartered at McGuire Air Force Base, New Jersey. Responsibility for air defense of the Northeast changed with various reorganizations.

The organization was in large part responsible for one of the foundational projects of the computer era: the development of the SAGE (Semi-Automatic Ground Environment) air defense system, from its first test at Bedford, Massachusetts, in 1951, to the installation of the first unit of the New York Air Defense Sector of the SAGE system, in 1958.

The idea for SAGE grew out of Project Whirlwind, a World War II computer development effort, when the War Department realized that the Whirlwind computer might anchor a continent-wide advance warning system. Developed during the 1950s by Massachusetts Institute of Technology (MIT) Lincoln Laboratories engineers and scientists for the U.S. Air Force, SAGE monitored North American skies for possible attack by crewed aircraft and missiles for twenty-five years. Aside from its strategic importance, SAGE set the foundation for mass data-processing systems and foreshadowed many computer developments of the 1960s. The heart of the system, the IBM AN/FSQ-7 computer, was the first computer to have an internal memory composed of "magnetic cores," thousands of tiny ferrite rings that served as reversible electromagnets. SAGE also introduced computer-driven graphic displays, online keyboard terminals, time-sharing, high-availability computation with a redundant AN/FSQ-7 to fail over if the primary system went down, digital signal processing, digital transmission over leased telephone lines, digital track-while-scan, digital simulation, computer networking, and duplex computing.

The SAGE Direction Center DC-01 40°01′51″N 074°34′32″W was activated on 1 July 1958, the first sector to achieve this status. In a ceremony marking this achievement, General Curtis E. LeMay was the guest speaker. He described SAGE as, "A system centralizing many air defense functions, minimizing manual tasks and allowing electronic devices to perform hundreds of complex computations accurately and simultaneously to improve air defense capability."

In 1959 the first of two CIM-10 BOMARC surface to air missile sites became operational; at McGuire Air Force Base and at Suffolk County Missile Annex in Long Island.

On 1 April 1966, the NYADS was inactivated, as were the other 22 sectors in the country. The SAGE system remained active until replaced in 1983 by the newer technology Joint Surveillance System (JSS). The 3-story DC-01 SAGE building, with reinforced 3' concrete walls and roof now hosts the Headquarters, 21st Expeditionary Mobility Task Force, Air Mobility Command at McGuire AFB.

In 1983, the 24th Air Division was assigned to Griffiss Air Force Base to provide air defense for the Northeast. In 1987, NEADS was activated and co-located with the 24th AD.

On 1 July 1987, four of the previous ADCOM Air Defense sectors were reactivated, redesignated, assigned and colocated with the four remaining air divisions.

- The Montgomery Air Defense Sector (MOADS) became the Southeast Air Defense Sector or SEADS; assigned to 23d Air Division
- The Los Angeles Air Defense Sector (LAADS) became the Southwest Air Defense Sector or SWADS; assigned to 26th Air Division
- The Seattle Air Defense Sector (SEADS) became the Northwest Air Defense Sector or NWADS; assigned to 25th Air Division
- The New York Air Defense Sector (NYADS) became the Northeast Air Defense Sector NEADS; assigned to 24th Air Division

The ADTAC Air Divisions were inactivated.

- On 1 July 1987, 23d Air Division inactivated; assets transferred to Southeast Air Defense Sector.
- On 30 September 1990, 26th Air Division inactivated; assets transferred to Southwest Air Defense Sector.
- On 30 September 1990, 25th Air Division inactivated; assets transferred to Northwest Air Defense Sector.
- On 30 September 1990, 24th Air Division inactivated; assets transferred to Northeast Air Defense Sector.

In the mid-1990s, the Air National Guard (ANG) assumed responsibility for leading U.S. air defense. ANG flying units had performed the air defense mission for decades. But after the changeover, activated Guardsmen provided the command and staff for the Continental U.S. NORAD Region and its subordinate Sector HQs. All reported to First Air Force. The Northeast Sector was the first to transition. In December 1994, the New York Air National Guard activated the Northeast Air Defense Squadron to staff the Sector HQ.

- On 1 December 1994, the Northeast Air Defense Sector was reassigned to the New York Air National Guard; NEADS redesignated Northeast Air Defense Sector (ANG)
- On 1 January 1995, the NWADS and SWADS consolidated to become the Western Air Defense Sector, assigned to First Air Force.
- On 1 October 1995, the Southeast Air Defense Sector was reassigned to the Florida Air National Guard; SEADS redesignated Southeast Air Defense Sector (ANG)
- On 1 October 1997 the Western Air Defense Sector was reassigned to the Washington Air National Guard; WADS redesignated Western Air Defense Sector (ANG)

=== 21st century ===
In the aftermath of the 9/11 attacks, the Northeast Air Defense Sector pioneered many of the changes that now allow it to build a detailed internal air picture to identify and engage air threats originating from within North America. In addition to the Battle Control Center in Rome, NEADS helped establish and maintain two detachments in the National Capital Region to defend critical assets and improve interagency communication. Instructions for contacting NEADS and other military aviation commands were shared with 9-1-1 dispatch centers after 9/11, in the event of additional hijacking events. https://www.nj.gov/911/home/highlights/2009EMDGuidecards.pdf

On 1 November 2005, the NEADS and SEADS consolidated, giving the Northeast Air Defense Sector (NEADS) the responsibility of providing detection and air defense for the entire eastern half of the United States. NEADS was officially re-designated the Eastern Air Defense Sector (EADS) on 15 July 2009.

The Northeast Air Defense Squadron (NY ANG) formally became the 224th Air Defense Group in December 2014.

== Lineage ==
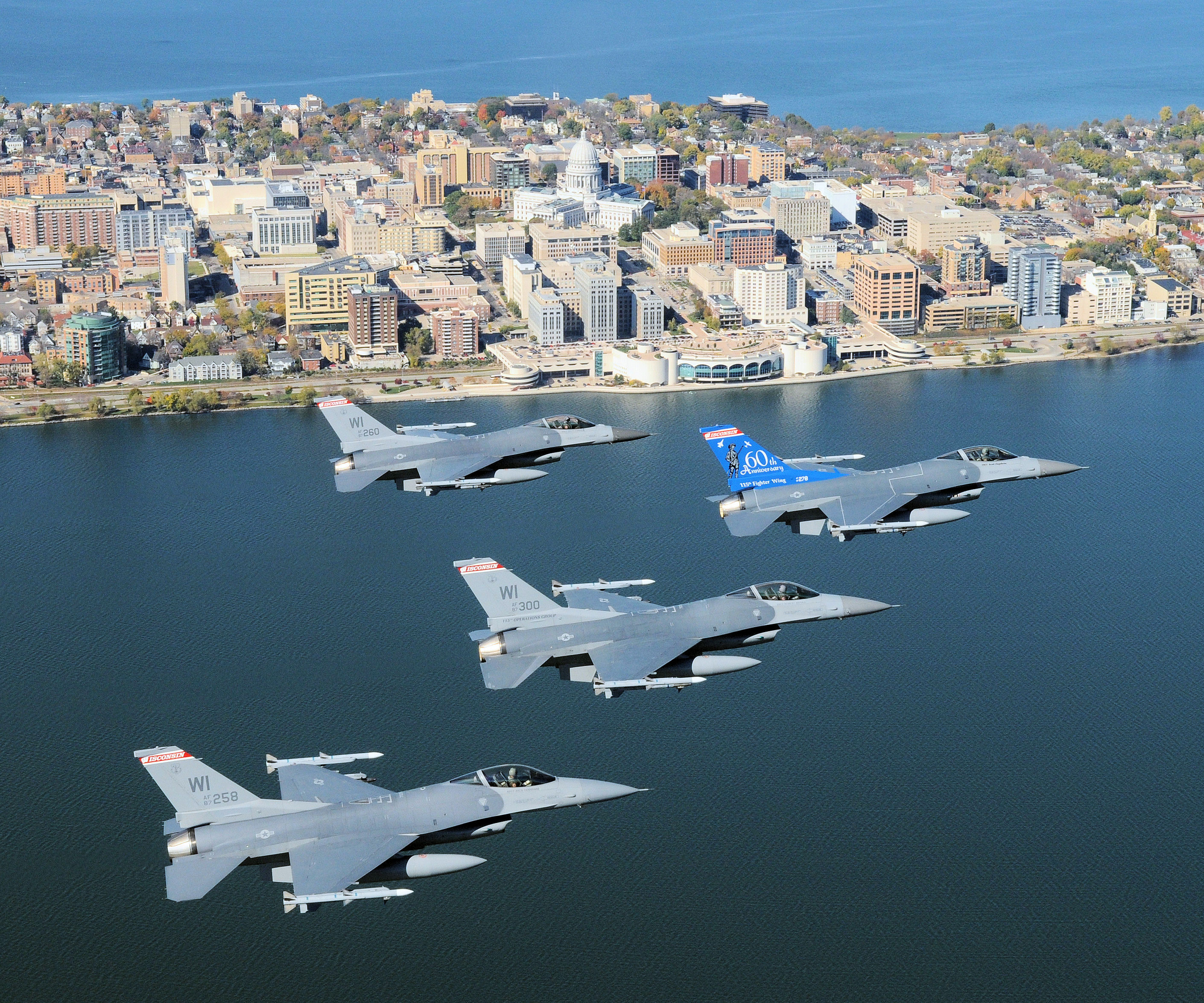
Wisconsin ANG 115th Fighter Wing, Wisconsin Air National Guard over Wisconsin's capital city of Madison

- Designated and organized as the 4621st Air Defense Wing, SAGE, 1 April 1956
- Redesignated as the New York Air Defense Sector on 1 October 1956
- Discontinued and inactivated on 1 April 1966
- Redesignated as Northeast Air Defense Sector and activated on 1 July 1987
- Redesignated as Northeast Air Defense Sector (ANG) on 1 December 1994
- Redesignated as Eastern Air Defense Sector on 15 July 2009

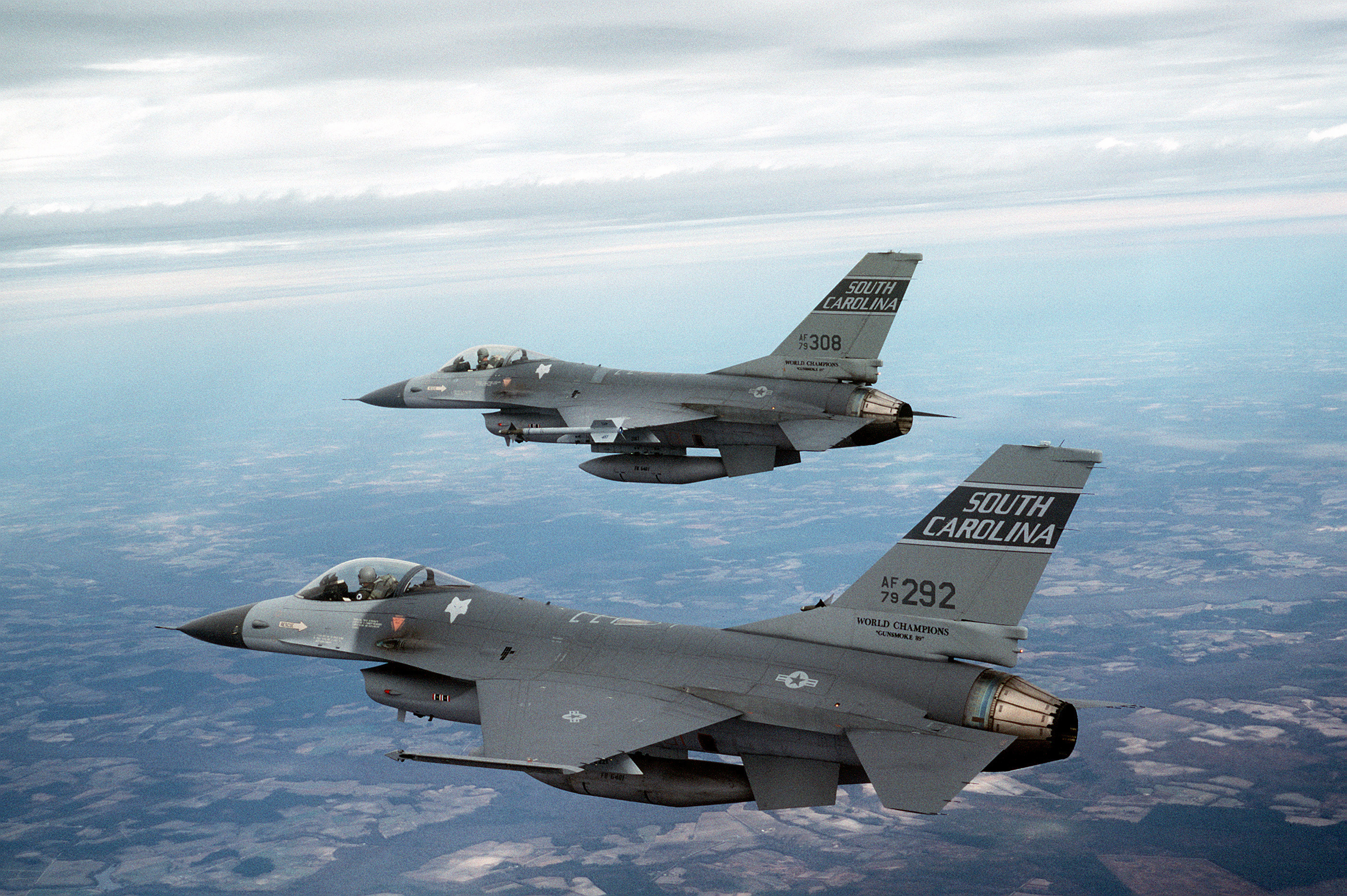
F-16A 'Vipers' of the South Carolina ANG's 169th TFG, 1989

== Assignments ==
- 26th Air Division, 1 April 1956
- Attached to 4709th Air Defense Wing 1 April 1956 – 18 October 1956
- Eastern Air Defense Force, 8 July 1956 – 1 October 1956
- 26th Air Division, 1 October 1956 – 1 April 1966
- 24th Air Division, 1 July 1987
- First Air Force (Later First Air Force (ANG)), 30 September 1990

Attached to First Air Forces Northern (Provisional), 28 February 2006 – 1 November 2007

== Stations ==
- McGuire AFB, New Jersey (1 April 1956 – 30 September 1968)
- Griffiss AFB, New York (1 October 1968 – 30 September 1995)
- Rome, New York (1 October 1995 – present)

== Components ==
=== Wings and Groups ===
- 52d Fighter Wing (Air Defense)

Suffolk County AFB, New York, 1 July 1963 – 1 April 1966

- 52d Fighter Group (Air Defense)

Suffolk County AFB, New York, 18 October 1956 – 1 July 1963

- 82d Fighter Group (Air Defense)

New Castle County Airport, Delaware, 18 October 1956 – 8 January 1958

- 4728th Air Defense Group

Dover AFB, Delaware, 8 February 1957 – 1 July 1958

- 4730th Air Defense Group

McGuire AFB, New Jersey, 8 February 1957 – 1 August 1959

=== Interceptor Squadrons ===
- 46th Fighter-Interceptor Squadron

Dover AFB, Delaware, 1 March 1956 – 8 February 1957

- 95th Fighter-Interceptor Squadron

Dover AFB, Delaware, 1 July 1963 – 1 April 1966

- 98th Fighter-Interceptor Squadron

Dover AFB, Delaware, 1 October 1956 – 8 February 1957; 1 July 1958 – 1 February 1959; 1 July 1961 – 1 July 1963
Suffolk County AFB, New York, 1 July 1963 – 30 September 1968

- 332d Fighter-Interceptor Squadron

McGuire AFB, New Jersey, 1 October 1956 – 8 February 1957

- 539th Fighter-Interceptor Squadron

McGuire AFB, New Jersey, 1 October 1956 – 8 February 1957; 1 August 1959 – 1 April 1966

=== Missile Squadrons ===
- 6th Air Defense Missile Squadron (BOMARC-A)

Suffolk County AFB, New York, 1 February 1959 – 15 December 1964

- 46th Air Defense Missile Squadron (BOMARC-A/B)

McGuire AFB, New Jersey, 1 January 1959 – 1 April 1966

=== Radar Squadrons ===
- 646th Aircraft Control and Warning (later Radar) Squadron

Highlands AFS, New Jersey, 18 October 1956 – 1 April 1966

- 770th Aircraft Control and Warning (later Radar) Squadron

Palermo AFS, New Jersey, 8 June 1957 – 1 October 1961

- 773d Aircraft Control and Warning (later Radar) Squadron

Montauk AFS, New York, 18 October 1956 – 1 April 1966

== Decorations ==
- Air Force Outstanding Unit Award

Northeastern Air Defense Sector (ANG), 1 June 1998 – 31 May 1999
Northeastern Air Defense Sector (ANG) 11 September 2001
Northeastern Air Defense Sector (ANG) 1 November 2008 – 31 October 2010
Northeastern Air Defense Sector (ANG) 1 June 2011 – 31 May 2013

- Air Force Organizational Excellence Award

Northeast Air Defense Sector, 1 July 1987 – 1 April 1989
Northeastern Air Defense Sector (ANG), 1 January 1990 – 1 January 1992
Northeastern Air Defense Sector (ANG), 1 June 1994 – 31 May 1996
Northeastern Air Defense Sector (ANG), 1 January 2001 – 30 April 2002
Northeastern Air Defense Sector (ANG), 31 July 2005 – 31 May 2007

== See also ==
- List of United States Air Force aircraft control and warning squadrons
- List of United States Air Force installations
- United States general surveillance radar stations
