= Operation Coronet =

During World War II, two operations in the Pacific theater were called Operation Coronet.

- An early planning name for Operation Chronicle, which was executed in June 1943
- Part of Operation Downfall, the planned invasion of Japan in March 1946, made unnecessary by the Japanese surrender in August 1945

== See also ==
- Operation Coronet Nighthawk, to stop drugs entering U.S.A. from Central and South America (1990-2001)
