= 98th Fighter-Interceptor Squadron =

98th Fighter-Interceptor Squadron

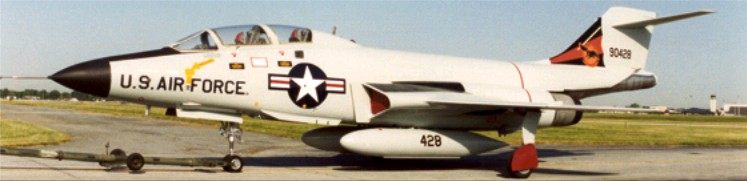
- McDonnell F-101B in 98th FIS markings at the Air Mobility Command Museum
- Active: 1942–1944; 1956-1968
- Country: United States
- Branch: United States Air Force
- Role: Fighter-Interceptor
- Part of: Air Defense Command

Insignia
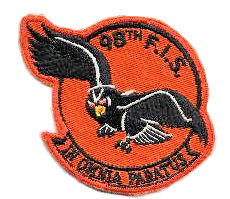
- Patch with the 98th Fighter-Interceptor Squadron emblem (approved 30 November 1956)

The 98th Fighter-Interceptor Squadron is an inactive United States Air Force unit. Its last assignment was with the New York Air Defense Sector of Air Defense Command stationed at Suffolk County Air Force Base, New York, where it was inactivated on 30 September 1968.

== History ==
=== World War II ===
It was activated in the summer of 1942 as part of III Fighter Command. It became a Curtiss P-40 Warhawk replacement training unit (RTU). It was inactivated on 1 May 1944 as part of a reorganization of training units.

=== Air Defense Command ===
It was reactivated in 1953 as part of Air Defense Command as an air defense squadron, equipped with Northrop F-89D Scorpion interceptors, and assigned to Dover Air Force Base, Delaware with a mission for the air defense of Philadelphia Delaware-Maryland-Virginia region. On 22 October 1962, before President John F. Kennedy told Americans that missiles were in place in Cuba, the squadron dispersed four of its force, equipped with nuclear tipped missiles to Atlantic City Airport and 4 each to other airports on the east coast at the start of the Cuban Missile Crisis. These planes returned to Dover after the crisis.

The squadron moved to Suffolk County Air Force Base, New York in 1963 to become part of the New York City air defense force. It upgraded in 1959 to the new McDonnell F-101B Voodoo and assigned alongside the F-101B interceptor was the F-101F operational and conversion trainer. The two-seat trainer version was equipped with dual controls, but carried the same armament as the F-101B and were fully combat-capable interceptors. It was inactivated in September 1968 as part of the drawdown of ADC interceptor bases, and the aircraft were passed along to the Air National Guard.

=== Lineage ===
- Constituted 98th Fighter Squadron on 16 July 1942

Activated on 23 July 1942
Disbanded on 1 May 1944

- Reconstituted and redesignated 98th Fighter-Interceptor Squadron on 24 October 1955

Activated on 8 March 1956
Inactivated on 30 September 1968

=== Assignments ===
- III Fighter Command

337th Fighter Group, 23 July 1942 – 1 May 1944

- Air Defense Command

4709th Air Defense Wing, 8 March 1956
4621st Air Defense Wing (later New York Air Defense Sector), 1 October 1956
4728th Air Defense Group, 8 February 1957
New York Air Defense Sector, 1 July 1958
Washington Air Defense Sector, 1 February 1959
New York Air Defense Sector, 1 July 1961 – 30 September 1968

=== Stations ===
- Morris Field, North Carolina, 23 July 1942
- Drew Field, Florida, 7 August 1942
- Sarasota Army Air Field, Florida, 3 January 1943 – 1 May 1944
- Dover Air Force Base, Delaware, 8 March 1956
- Suffolk County Air Force Base, New York, 1 July 1963 – 30 September 1968

=== Aircraft ===
- Bell P-39 Airacobra, 1943
- Republic P-43 Lancer, 1942
- Curtiss P-40 Warhawk, 1942–1944
- Northrop F-89D Scorpion, 1956
- Northrop F-89H Scorpion, 1956–1957
- Northrop F-89J Scorpion, 1957–1959
- McDonnell F-101B Voodoo, 1959–1968
- McDonnell F-4 Phantom II, 1969-1982
- General Dynamics F-16 Fighting Falcon, 1982-1992
