= 4728th Air Defense Group =

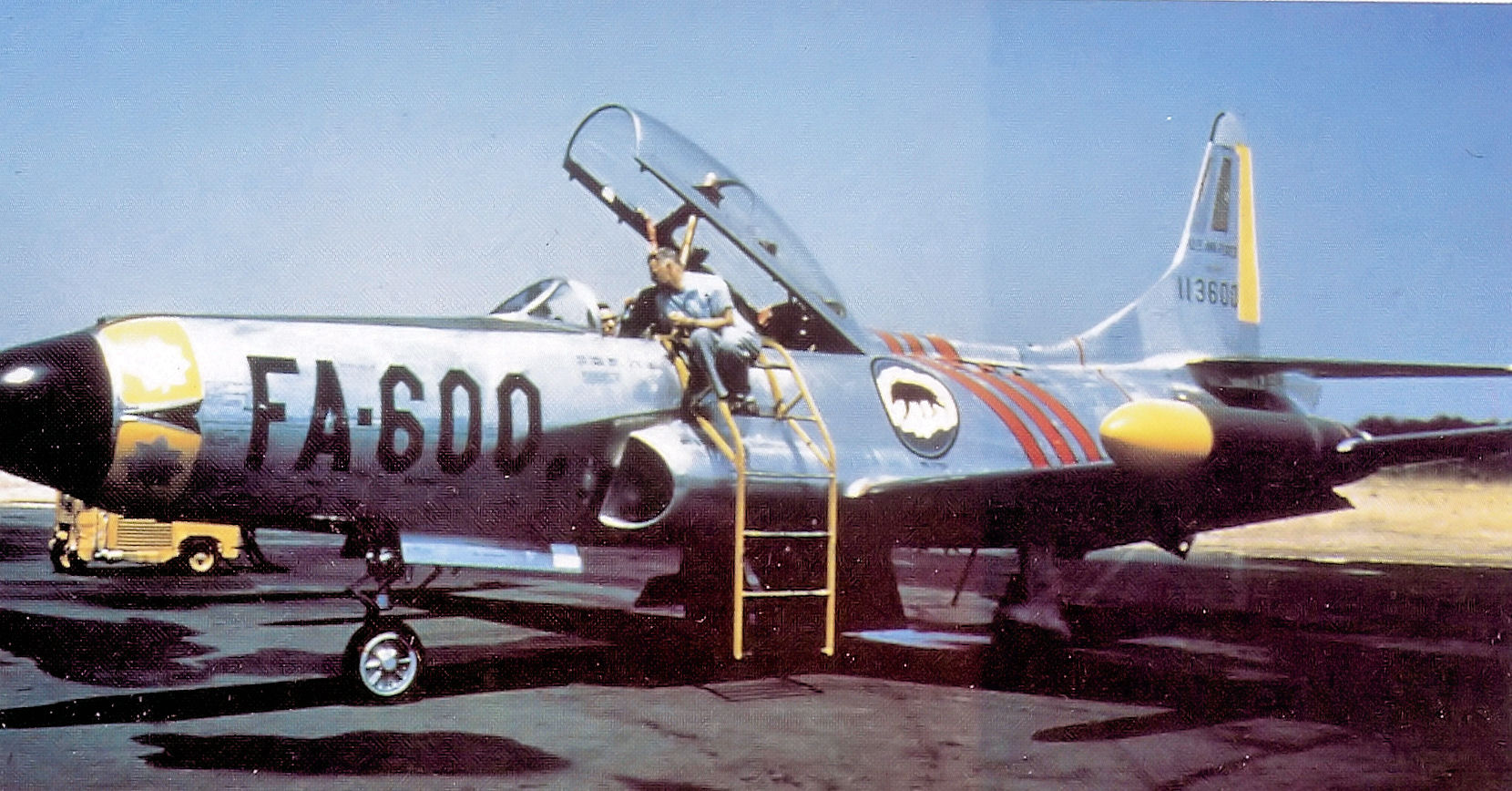
- 46th Fighter-Interceptor Squadron F-94C at Dover AFB (Note: Aircraft is Lockheed F-94C-1-LO Starfire, serial 51-13600. It was sent to the Military Aircraft Storage and Disposition Center on 18 March 1958 and scrapped on 25 March. Dirkx, Marco (9 July 2025). "1951 USAF Serial Numbers". Joe Baugher’s Serial Number List..)
- Active: 1957–1958
- Country: United States
- Branch: United States Air Force
- Type: Fighter interceptor
- Role: Air defense

The 4728th Air Defense Group is a discontinued United States Air Force organization. It was assigned to the New York Air Defense Sector and stationed at Dover Air Force Base.

The group was formed to provide a single command and support organization for the two fighter interceptor squadrons of Air Defense Command (ADC), that were tenants at Dover, a Military Air Transport Service (MATS) base. It was also assigned a maintenance squadron to perform aircraft maintenance. It was discontinued after the 46th Fighter-Interceptor Squadron inactivated in 1958, leaving only a single fighter squadron at Griffiss.

== History ==
The 4728th Air Defense Group was organized in early 1957. The group was established to provide a headquarters for Air Defense Command (ADC) Fighter-Interceptor Squadrons (FIS) stationed at Dover Air Force Base, Delaware, a Military Air Transport Service base, whose 1607th Air Base Group acted as the host base organization. It was assigned the 46th Fighter-Interceptor Squadron, flying Lockheed F-94 Starfire aircraft, armed with Mighty Mouse rockets. and the 98th Fighter-Interceptor Squadron, flying Northrop F-89 Scorpion aircraft, armed with both folding fin rockets and AIM-4 Falcons as its operational squadrons. Both aircraft had a radar officer to operate the aircraft airborne intercept radar. The group mission was air defense of the Middle Atlantic Area of the United States. These squadrons were already stationed at Dover and had been assigned to the New York Air Defense Sector.

In August, maintenance for the two squadrons was combined in the 604th Consolidated Aircraft Maintenance Squadron (CAMS), which was activated at Dover. The 98th converted to newer model F-89s, which could carry nuclear armed AIR-2 Genies, in the fall of 1957. The group was discontinued when the 46th Squadron was inactivated, leaving only a single operational ADC squadron at Dover. The 604th CAMS was also inactivated, while the 98th was then assigned directly to the New York Air Defense Sector.

=== Lineage ===
- Designated and organized as the 4728th Air Defense Group on 8 February 1957

Discontinued on 1 July 1958

=== Assignments ===
- New York Air Defense Sector, 8 February 1957 – 1 July 1958

=== Stations ===
- Dover Air Force Base, Delaware, 8 February 1957 – 1 July 1958

=== Components ===
- 46th Fighter-Interceptor Squadron, 8 February 1957 – 1 July 1958
- 98th Fighter-Interceptor Squadron, 8 February 1957 – 1 July 1958
- 604th Consolidated Aircraft Maintenance Squadron, 8 August 1957 – 1 July 1958

=== Aircraft ===
- Northrop F-89H Scorpion, 1957
- Northrop F-89J Scorpion, 1957–1958
- Lockheed F-94C Starfire, 1957–1958

== See also ==
- F-89 Scorpion units of the United States Air Force
- F-94 Starfire units of the United States Air Force
- List of United States Air Force Aerospace Defense Command Interceptor Squadrons
