= 115th Operations Group =

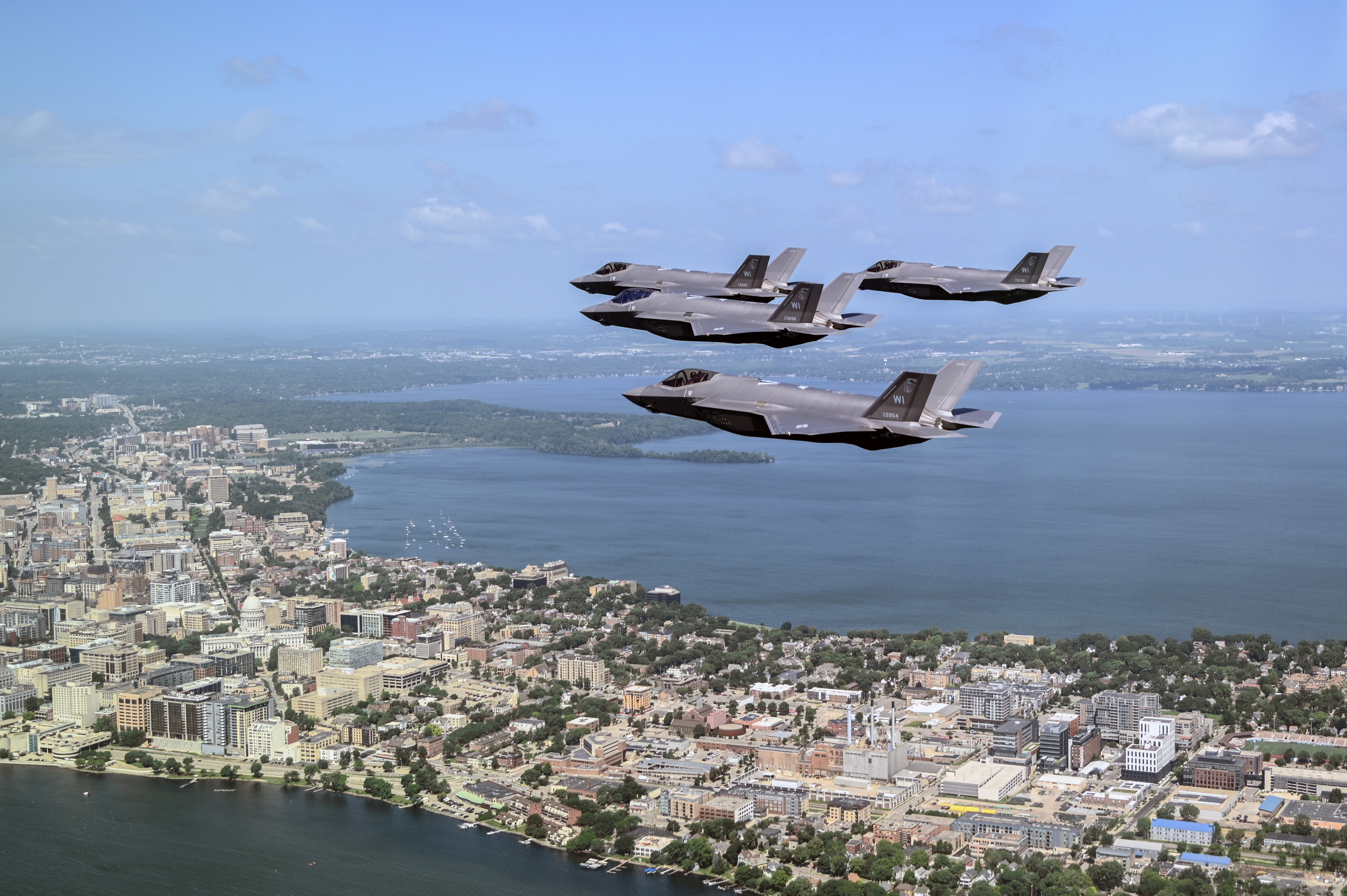
- 176th Fighter Squadron F-35A Lightning IIs in flight over Madison, Wisconsin, 2025
- Active: 1956–present
- Country: United States
- Branch: Air National Guard
- Role: Fighter
- Part of: Wisconsin Air National Guard
- Garrison/HQ: Truax Field Air National Guard Base
- Tail Code: Red tail stripe "Wisconsin" in white letters, "WI"
- Decorations: Air Force Outstanding Unit Award

Insignia
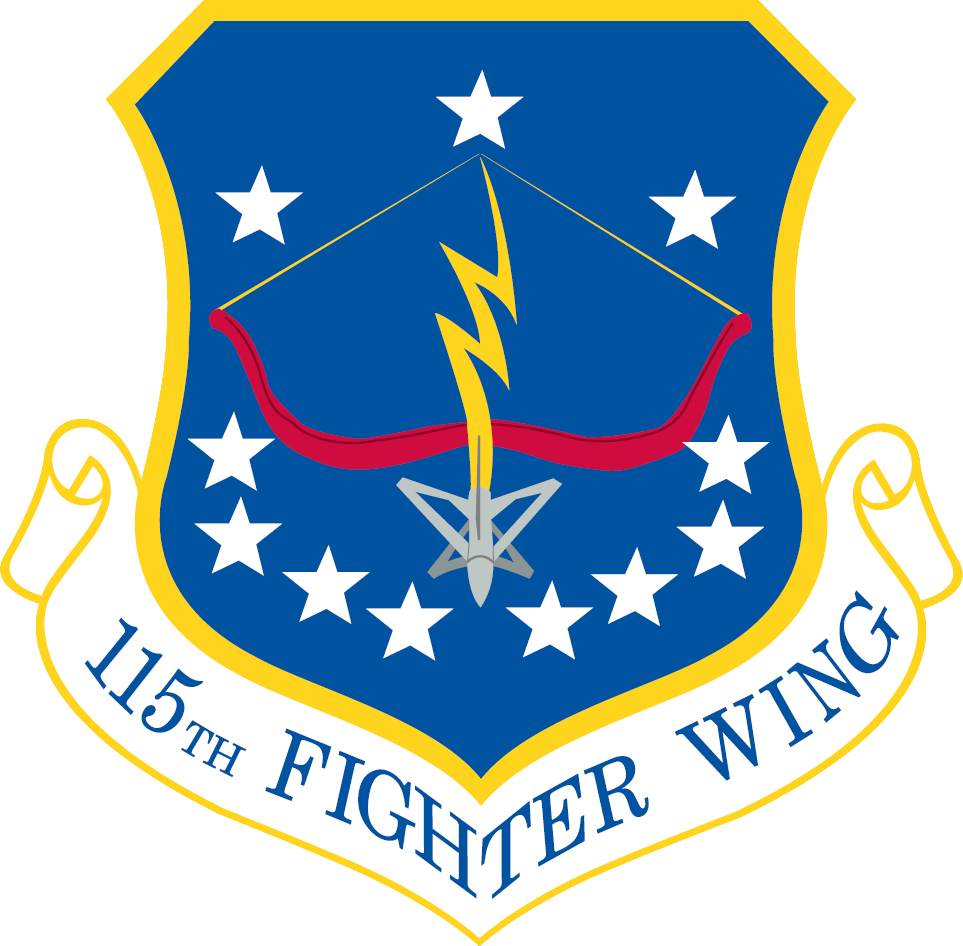
- 115th Operations Group emblem

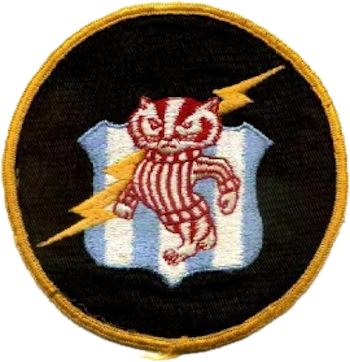
- Patch with 115th Fighter-Interceptor Group heritage emblem

The 115th Operations Group is a unit of the Wisconsin Air National Guard, stationed at Truax Field Air National Guard Base, Madison, Wisconsin. If activated to federal service, the Wing is gained by the United States Air Force's Air Combat Command. The group was first organized in 1956 as the 115th Fighter Group and served in the air defense role until 1974, when it converted to a forward air control mission. It was inactive from 1979 to 1994, when it assumed its present mission.

As an Air National Guard unit, it is normally under the command of the Governor, but has a federal role as well. Currently the wing has personnel and/or aircraft assigned to Operation Noble Eagle, Operation Jump Start and regularly serves with the Air Expeditionary Force in Iraq and Afghanistan.

== Units ==
The 115th Operations Group consists of the following units:

- 176th Fighter Squadron
- 115th Operations Support Squadron

== History ==
On 15 April 1956, the Wisconsin Air National Guard 176th Fighter-Interceptor Squadron and supporting elements were reorganized as a group, and the 115th Fighter Group was established. The 176th became the group's flying squadron. The group was also assigned several support units, composed of personnel formerly assigned to the 128th Fighter-Interceptor Wing.

=== Air defense ===
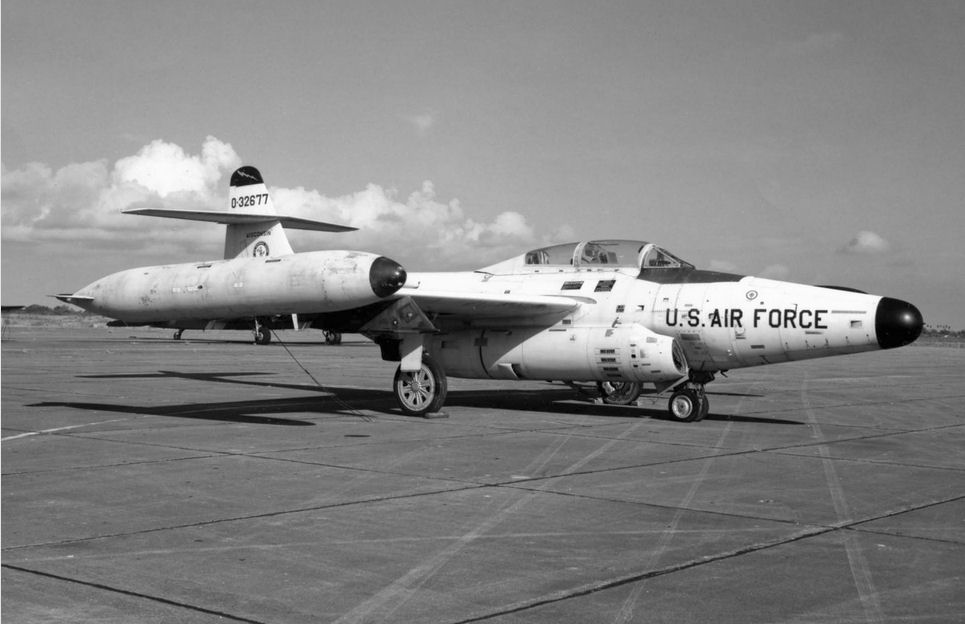
176th Fighter-Interceptor Squadron F-89J 53-2686 in 1964

The group trained for its air defense mission with annual training performed at Volk Field from 1956 to 1962. Beginning in 1963, it moved to "year-around" training. In January 1960, Northrop F-89 Scorpion crews assumed an around-the-clock runway alert commitment of two armed aircraft. With this undertaking came the F-89J with an armament platform that included the AIR-2 Genie. The AIR-2A was the first US air-to-air missile with a nuclear warhead. The 176th FIS exchanged their F-89s for the Convair F-102 Delta Dagger in early 1966.

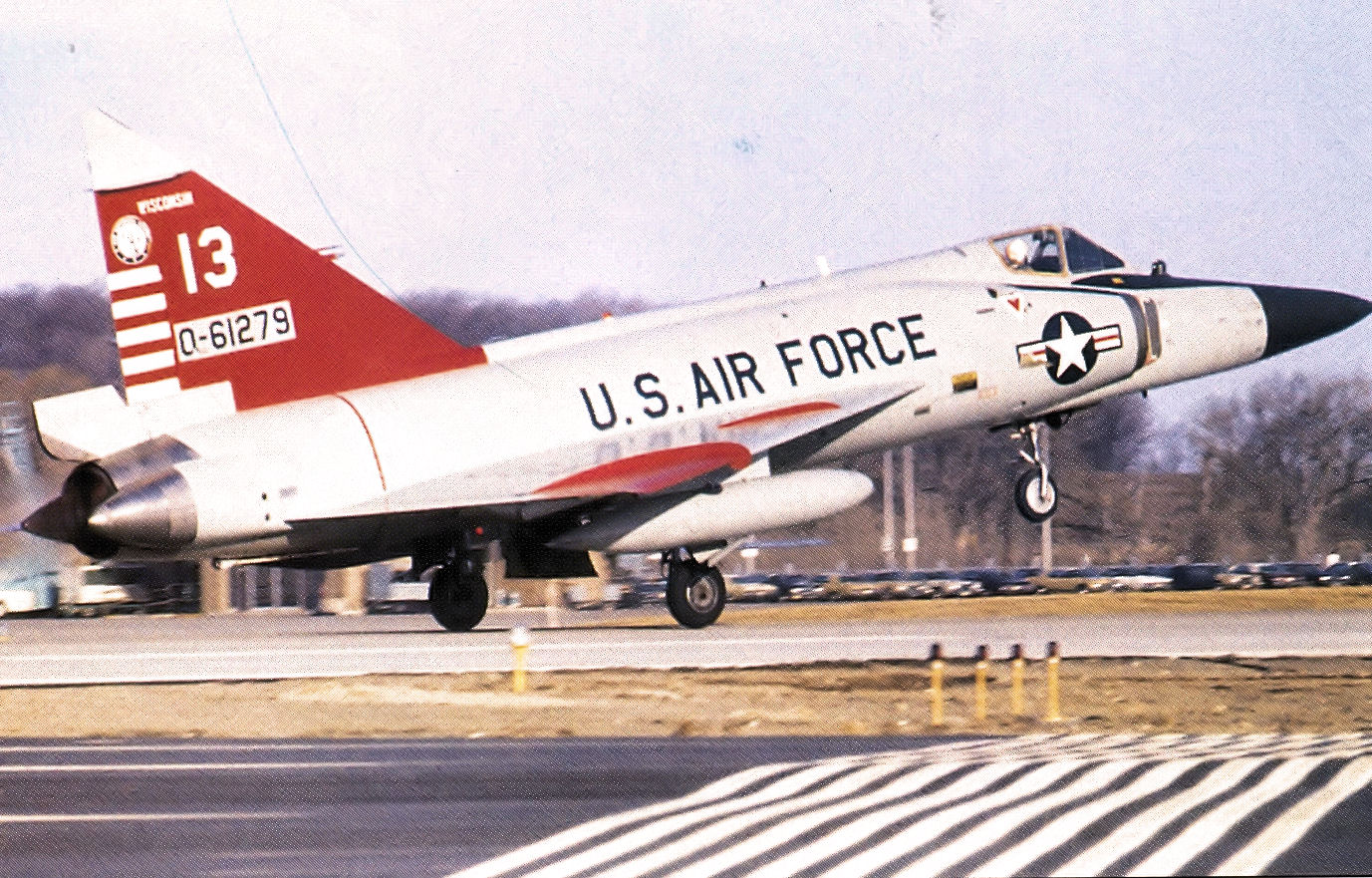
176th Fighter Interceptor Squadron Convair F-102A-75-CO Delta Dagger 56-1279 taking off from Truax Field, Wisconsin, 1970

In May 1966, the group replaced its F-89s with the Convair F-102 Delta Dagger. After a period of retraining in the new supersonic interceptors, the unit resumed its air defense "runway alert" mission in the spring of 1967. One year later in June 1969, the unit airlifted to Gulfport, Mississippi for summer training, ending six years of "year around" alerts at their home base.

In September 1972, the group's 176th Squadron won the William Tell Competition in the F-102 category. The event, held at Tyndall Air Force Base, included top Air National Guard, Canadian Air Force and active Air Force units worldwide. The competition included 12 teams of 48 aircraft, each team scored on aerial marksmanship, weapons control, weapons loading and maintenance.

=== Forward air control ===
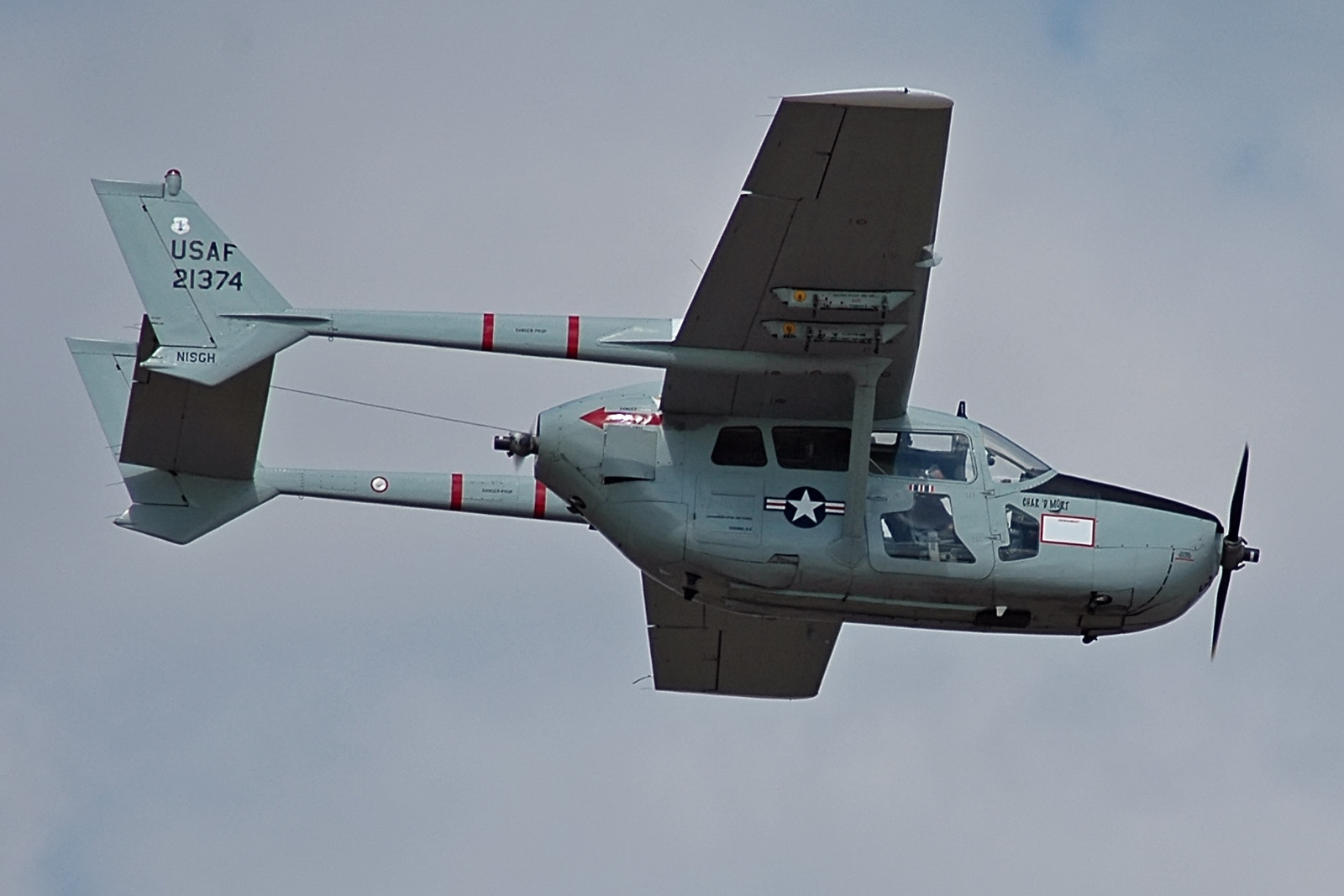
Air National Guard O-2 Skymaster

In 1974, the group, named the 115th Fighter-Interceptor Group since 1972, replaced its F-102s with the Cessna O-2A Skymaster forward air control aircraft and became the 115th Tactical Air Support Group. The O-2 was the military version of the Cessna 337 Skymaster, a high wing, twin-boom aircraft with a unique centerline pusher/tractor twin engine configuration. The O-2A was used in forward air control missions, often in conjunction with a ground forward air controller accompanied by a radio operator, maintenance, and driver (ROMAD) team. Its gaining command changed from Air Defense Command to Tactical Air Command. In January 1979 the group was inactivated and its components assigned directly to its parent 128th Tactical Air Support Wing.

=== Current mission ===
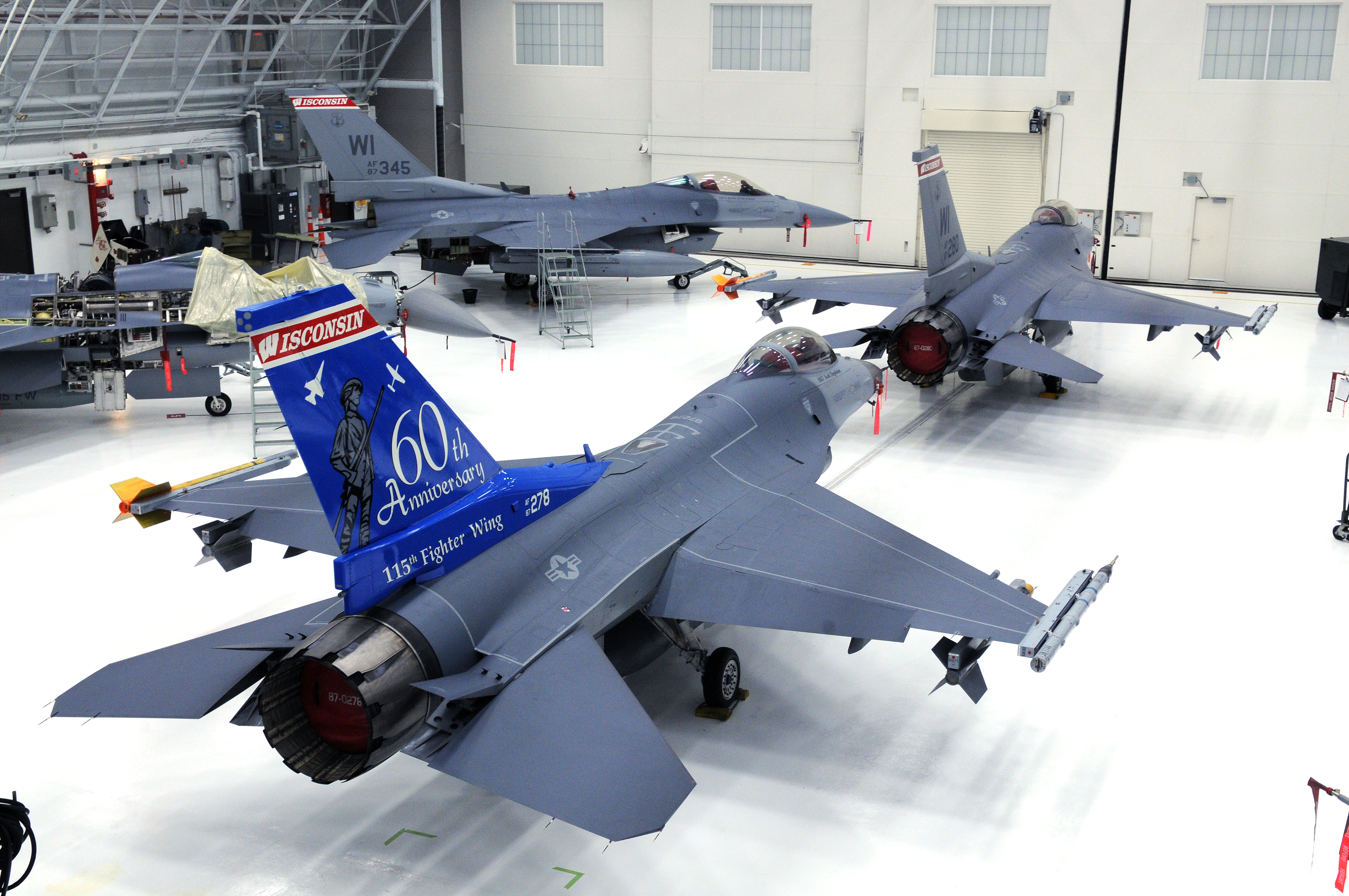
176th Fighter Squadron F-16C Fighting Falcons in the hangar at Truax Field, 2009

With the end of the Cold War, the early 1990s marked several changes. In 1995, the 128th Fighter Wing became the 115th Fighter Wing as the Air National Guard implemented the Air Force Objective Wing organization. The reorganization including reactivating the 115th as the 115th Operations Group.

The 115th Wing now flew the F-16C/D block 30 Fighting Falcon airframes with an enlarged air inlet. The first F-16s had arrived at Truax on 1 April 1993. The current role of the group is air interdiction and close air support. The group is capable of air-to-air, close air support and precision guided bombing missions. It operates munitions such as the JDAM series bombs and the AIM-9X air-to-air missile.

Operations participated in by the 115th Group include: Operation Coronet Chariot, Karup AS, Denmark 1994, Operation Northern Watch, Incirlik Air Base, Turkey 1997, Operation Southern Watch, Al Jaber Air Base, Kuwait 1997-98, Operation Southern Watch, Prince Sultan Air Base, Saudi Arabia 1999, Operation Coronet Nighthawk, Curacao, Netherlands Antilles 2001, Operation Enduring Freedom, Al Udeid Air Base, Qatar 2004–05, Balad Air Base, Iraq, 2006, 08, & 09, Africa, 2013 and Operation Noble Eagle, from 11 September 2001 to the present.

== Lineage ==
- Designated as the 115th Fighter Group (Air Defense) and allotted to the Air National Guard on 15 April 1956

Activated and extended federal recognition on 15 April 1956

- Redesignated 115th Fighter-Interceptor Group on 1 January 1972
- Redesignated 115th Tactical Air Support Group on 9 November 1974

Inactivated on 1 January 1979

- Redesignated 115th Operations Group and activated on 1 October 1994

=== Assignments ===
- 128th Air Defense Wing, 15 April 1956
- 126th Air Defense Wing, 1 March 1958
- Wisconsin Air National Guard, 1 August 1969
- 128th Fighter-Interceptor Wing (later 128th Tactical Air Support Wing), 1 January 1972 - 1 January 1979
- 115th Fighter Wing, 1 October 1994 – present

Gaining commands

Air Defense Command, 15 April 1956
Tactical Air Command, 9 November 1974 - 1 January 1979
Air Combat Command, 1 October 1994 - present

=== Components ===
Operational squadron

- 176th Fighter-Interceptor Squadron (later 176th Tactical Air Support Squadron, 176th Fighter Squadron), 15 April 1956 – 1 January 1979, 1 October 1994 – present

Support units

- 115th USAF Dispensary (later 115th USAF Clinic), 15 April 1956 – c. 1 April 1972
- 115th Air Base Squadron (later 115th Combat Support Sq), 15 April 1956 – c. 1 April 1972
- 115 Consolidated Aircraft Maintenance Squadron, 1 January 1959 – c. 1 April 1972
- 115th Materiel Squadron, 15 April 1956 – 20 May 1964
- 115th Operations Support Squadron, 1 October 1994 – present
- 115th Supply Squadron, 20 May 1964 – c. 1 April 1972
- 115th Civil Engineering Flight, 1 November 1969 – c. 1 April 1972

=== Stations ===
- Truax Field (later Truax Field Air National Guard Base), Wisconsin, 15 March 1992 – present

=== Aircraft ===
- Northrop F-89C Scorpion, 1956-1957
- Northrop F-89D Scorpion, 1957-1959
- Northrop F-89H Scorpion, 1959-1960
- Northrop F-89J Scorpion, 1960-1966
- Convair F-102A Delta Dagger, 1966-1974
- Cessna O-2 Skymaster, 1974-1979
- General Dynamics F-16 Fighting Falcon, 1994–present

== See also ==
- National Guard
- List of United States Air National Guard Groups & Wings
- F-89 Scorpion units of the United States Air Force
- General Dynamics F-16 Fighting Falcon operators
