= 46th Fighter Training Squadron =

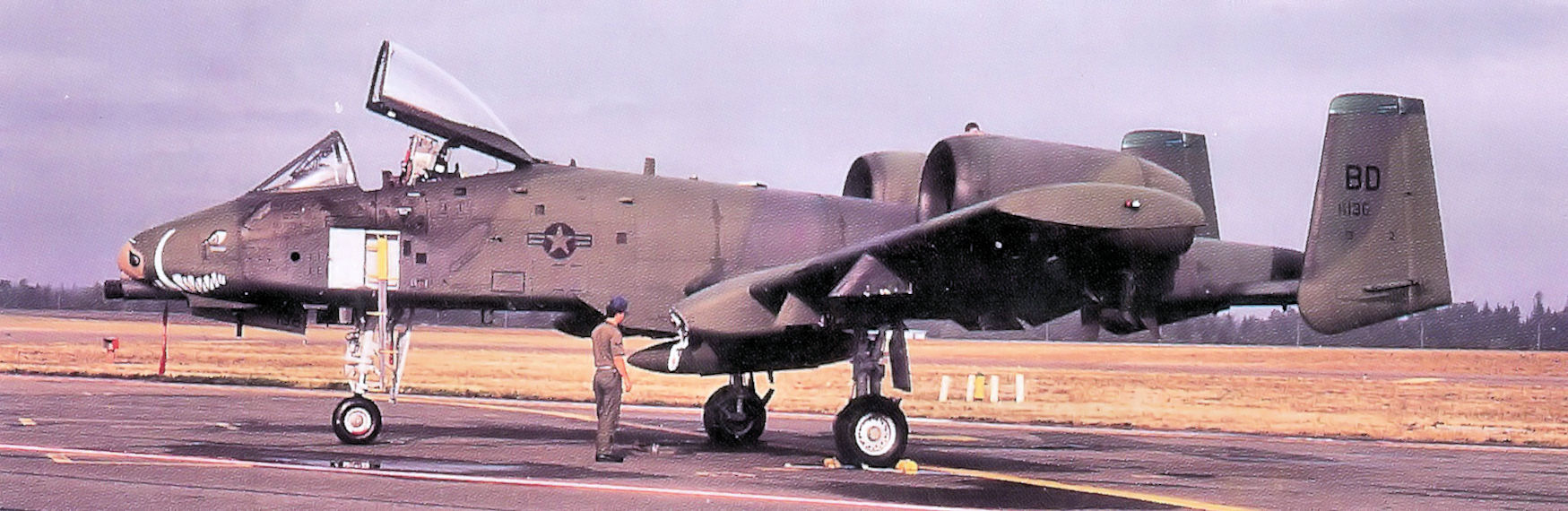
- 46th Fighter Training SquadronA-10 Thunderbolt II (Note: Aircraft is Fairchild Republic A-10A Thunderbolt II, serial 79-136.)
- Active: 1940–1946; 1952–1958; 1962–1971; 1973–1978; 1983–1993
- Country: United States
- Branch: United States Air Force
- Role: fighter
- Engagements: Pacific Ocean Theater
- Decorations: Distinguished Unit Citation; Air Force Outstanding Unit Award

Insignia
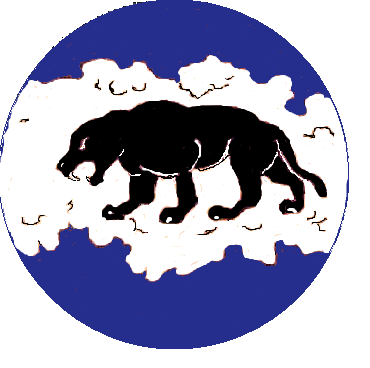
- 46th Fighter Training Squadron emblem (approved 11 March 1942) (Note: On a blue disc a black sabre-tooth tiger passant in front of a horizontal bank of white clouds. Maurer, Combat Squadrons, p. 204.)

The 46th Fighter Training Squadron is an inactive United States Air Force unit. Its last assignment was with the 917th Operations Group at Barksdale Air Force Base, Louisiana. where it was inactivated on 1 October 1993.

The squadron was first activated in 1940, as the United States expanded its military forces prior to World War II, as the 46th Pursuit Squadron. The squadron formed part of the air defenses of the Hawaiian Islands, and suffered heavy losses in the attack on Pearl Harbor. It served in Hawaii and the Pacific for the remainder of the wark, earning a Distinguished Unit Citation for long-range fighter missions over Japan in 1945. It was inactivated on Guam in 1946.

The squadron was reactivated as the 46th Fighter-Interceptor Squadron in 1952 and served in the air defense role before inactivating again in 1958. It was activated again in 1962 as the 46th Tactical Fighter Squadron and became one of the first McDonnell F-4 Phantom II fighter units, flying the Phantom until 1971, and deploying elements to Southeast Asia. It was activated again in the reserves in 1973, and served as a reserve fighter unit until inactivated.

== History ==
The 46th, who was initially assigned to the 15th Fighter/Pursuit Group, its history goes back to World War II, when the 15th Pursuit Group was largely destroyed during the 7 December 1941 Japanese attack on Pearl Harbor at Hickam Field.

=== World War II ===
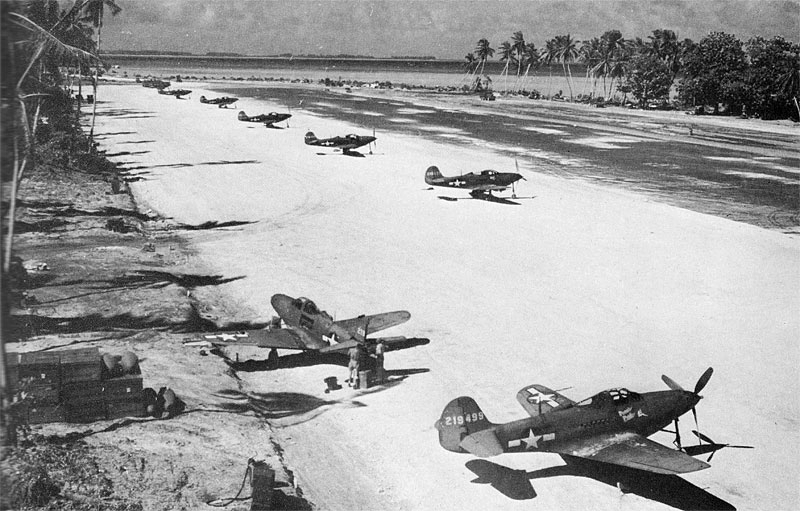
P-39Qs of the 46th Fighter Squadron at Makin Island in December 1943.

After the attack on Pearl Harbor, the squadron was assigned to the VII Fighter Command. Re-equipped initially with Bell P-39 Airacobras and Curtiss P-40 Warhawks, ts primary mission was the air defense of the Hawaiian Islands. In 1943, the squadron deployed to the Central Pacific Area, engaging in combat from Makin Island in December 1943. Returned to Hawaii and was again re-equipped with very long-range Lockheed P-38 Lightnings and North American P-51D Mustangs. In early March 1945 deployed to Iwo Jima, being attached to the Twentieth Air Force. From Iwo Jima, the squadron performed escort missions with Boeing B-29 Superfortress bombers bombing the Japanese Home Islands. After the Japanese Surrender in September 1945, the squadron moved to Guam, where it operated until inactivating in October 1946.

=== United States Air Force ===
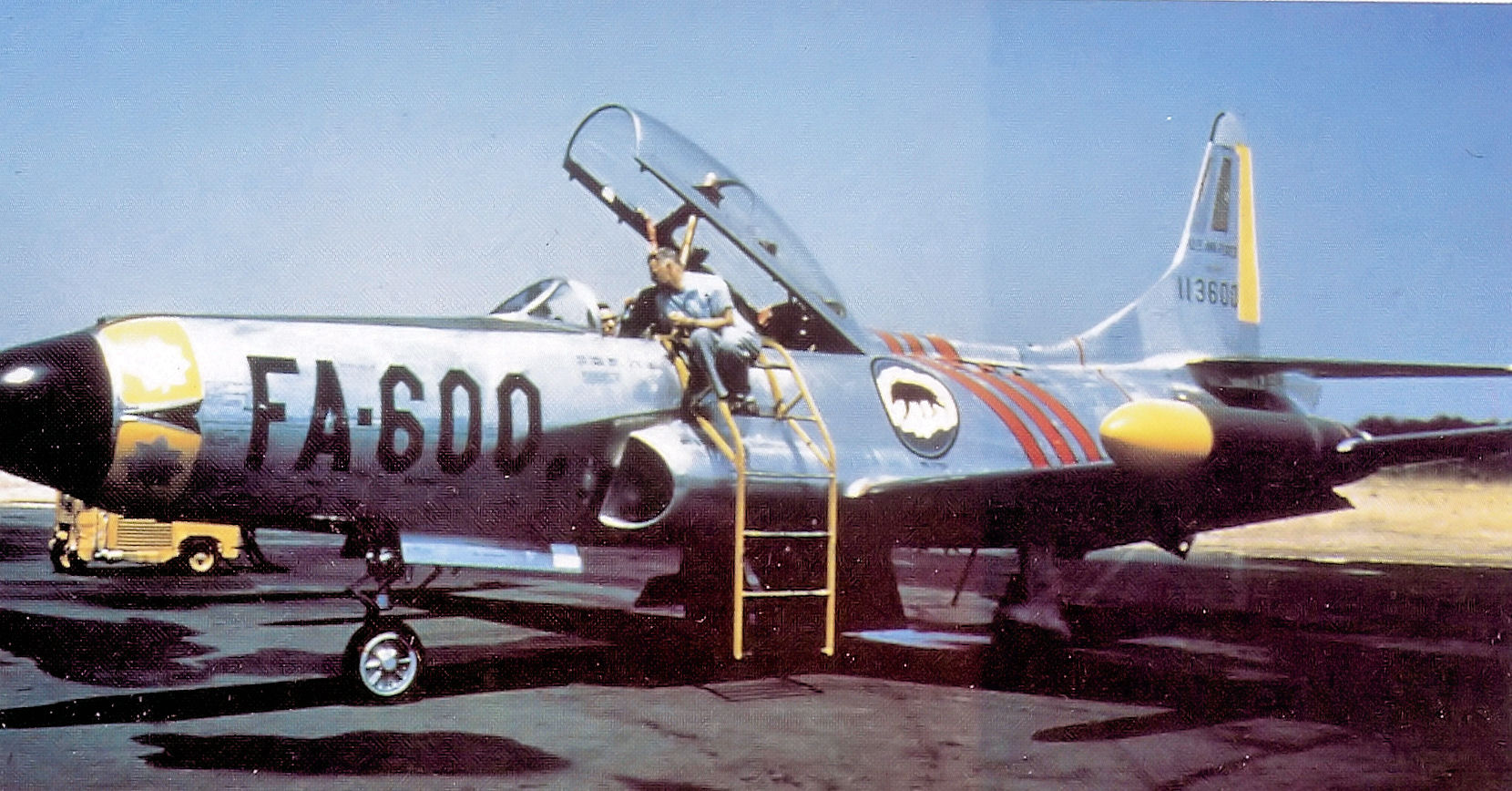
46th Fighter-Interceptor Squadron F-94 Starfire (Note: Aircraft is Lockheed F-94C-1-LO Starfire, serial 51-13600 at Dover AFB, Delaware in 1954.)

The squadron was redesignated the 46th Fighter-Interceptor Squadron and reactivated in November 1952 at Dover Air Force Base, Delaware and assigned to the 4710th Defense Wing of Air Defense Command (ADC). The squadron assumed the mission, personnel, and Lockheed F-94 Starfire interceptors of the 148th Fighter-Interceptor Squadron, which had been called to active service in the expansion of the United States Air Force for the Korean War which was returned to the control of the Pennsylvania Air National Guard. the squadron's mission was the air defense of southeastern Pennsylvania, south New Jersey, Delaware and Maryland. In 1956, as ADC prepared for the implementation of the Semi-Automatic Ground Environment system, the 4710th wing moved to Illinois and the squadron was briefly assigned to the 4709th Air Defense Wing before being transferred to what would become the automated New York Air Defense Sector. The unit was inactivated in 1958.

=== Tactical fighter operations ===
Was reactivated in 1962 at MacDill Air Force Base, Florida, equipped with swept-wing Republic F-84F Thunderstreak tactical fighters. Received new McDonnell F-4C Phantom IIs in 1964, one of the first squadrons in the Air Force to fly the new fighter. Conducted tactical fighter combat crew training for the 12th Tactical Fighter Wing. The squadron participated in a variety of exercises, operations and readiness tests of Tactical Air Command, becoming a replacement training unit for F-4 aircrews prior to their deployment to Southeast Asia beginning in 1965. During the 1968 Pueblo Crisis, the squadron deployed fighters to Seymour Johnson AFB, North Carolina, backfilling fighters deployed to South Korea by the 4th Tactical Fighter Squadron. Transferred to the incoming 1st Tactical Fighter Wing in 1970 when the wing was moved from ADC to TAC. Inactivated in 1971, personnel and aircraft being transferred to the 71st Tactical Fighter Squadron when the former 15th Wing units were inactivated.

=== Air Force reserve ===
Reactivated in the Air Force Reserve in 1975 at Grissom Air Force Base, Indiana, receiving Cessna A-37B Dragonfly counter-insurgency aircraft returned from the Vietnam War. Provided combat crew training in close air support tactics for USAF and friendly foreign nations until inactivated in 1978, transferring the A-37s to the 706th Tactical Fighter Squadron.

Equipped with Fairchild Republic A-10A Thunderbolt II ground attack aircraft in 1983 at Barksdale Air Force Base, Louisiana, mission was to be an A-10 Replacement Training Unit for Air Force Reserve pilots. Operated the A-10 at Barksdale until inactivated in 1993 as part of the post-Cold War drawdown, aircraft transferred to Davis–Monthan AFB, Arizona where A-10 training was consolidating with the active-duty 355th Wing.

== Lineage ==
- Constituted as the 46th Pursuit Squadron (Fighter) on 22 November 1940

Activated on 1 December 1940
Redesignated 46th Pursuit Squadron (Interceptor)' on 12 February 1942
Redesignated 46th Fighter Squadron on 15 May 1942
Inactivated on 10 October 1946

- Redesignated 46th Fighter-Interceptor Squadron on 11 September 1952

Activated on 1 November 1952
Inactivated on 1 July 1958

- Redesignated 46th Tactical Fighter Squadron and activated, on 17 April 1962 (not organized)

Organized on 1 July 1962
Inactivated on 1 July 1971

- Activated on 1 July 1975

Inactivated on 1 July 1978

- Redesignated 46th Tactical Fighter Training Squadron and activated on 30 September 1983

Redesignated 46th Fighter Training Squadron on 1 February 1992
Inactivated on 1 October 1993

=== Assignments ===
- 15th Pursuit Group (later 15th Fighter Group), 1 December 1940
- 21st Fighter Group, 15 June 1944 – 10 October 1946
- 4710th Defense Wing (later 4710th Air Defense Wing), 1 November 1952
- 4709th Air Defense Wing, 1 March 1956
- 4621st Air Defense Wing (later New York Air Defense Sector), 1 October 1956
- 4728th Air Defense Group, 8 February 1957 – 1 July 1958
- Tactical Air Command, 17 April 1962 (not organized)
- 15th Tactical Fighter Wing, 1 July 1962
- 1st Tactical Fighter Wing, 1 October 1970 – 1 July 1971
- 434th Tactical Fighter Wing, 1 July 1975 – 1 July 1978
- 917th Tactical Fighter Group, 30 September 1983
- 917th Operations Group, 1 August 1992 - 1 October 1993

=== Stations ===
- Wheeler Field, Oahu, Hawaii, 1 December 1940
- Hickam Field, Hawaii, 6 February 1942
- Mokuleia Army Airfield, Hawaii, 22 May 1942
- Hilo Army Airfield, Hawaii, 16 December 1942 – 19 March 1943
- Canton Airfield, Phoenix Islands, 27 March 1943
- Makin Island, 18 December 1943
- Wheeler Field, Hawaii, 17 February 1944
- Mokuleia Army Airfield, Hawaii Territory, 13 October 1944
- Central Field (Iwo Jima), 26 March 1945
- South Field (Iwo Jima), 15 July 1945
- Isely Airfield, Saipan, Mariana Islands, 5 December 1945
- Northwest Field (Guam), Mariana Islands, 17 April – 10 October 1946
- Dover Air Force Base, Delaware, November 1952 – 1 July 1958
- MacDill Air Force Base, Florida, 1 July 1962 – 1 July 1971
- Deployed to Udorn Royal Thai Air Force Base, Thailand-, 11 May – 22 August 1965; 1–10 November 1965
- Grissom Air Force Base, Indiana, 1 July 1975 – 1 July 1978
- Barksdale Air Force Base, Louisiana, 30 September 1983 – 1 October 1993

=== Aircraft ===
- Grumman OA-9, 1940
- A-12 Shrike, 1940
- Curtiss P-36 Hawk, 1940–1941
- Bell P-39 Airacobra, 1941–1944
- Curtiss P-40 Warhawk, 1941–1943
- Lockheed P-38 Lightning, 1944–1945
- North American P-51 Mustang, 1944–1946
- P-47 Thunderbolt, 1946
- Lockheed F-94B Starfire, 1952–1953
- Lockheed F-94C Starfire, 1953–1958
- Republic F-84 Thunderflash, 1962–1964
- McDonnell F-4C Phantom II, 1964–1971
- Cessna A-37B Dragonfly, 1975-1978
- Fairchild Republic A-10A Thunderbolt II, 1983-1993

== See also ==
- List of United States Air Force Aerospace Defense Command Interceptor Squadrons
