= 176th Fighter Squadron =

176th Fighter Squadron

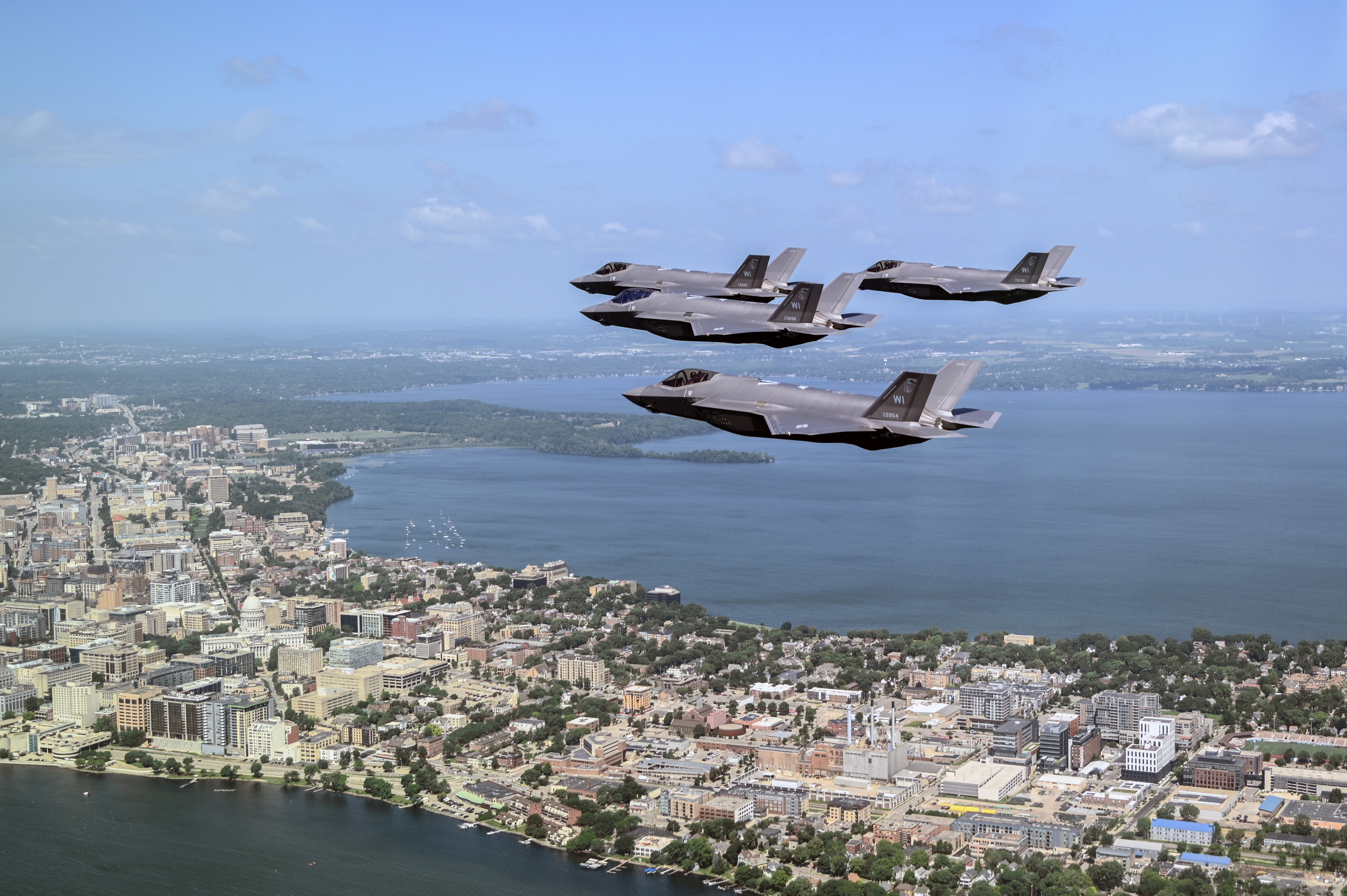
- 176th Fighter Squadron F-35A Lightning IIs in flight over Madison, Wisconsin, 2025
- Active: 1942–1944; 1948–1952; 1952–present
- Country: United States
- Allegiance: Wisconsin
- Branch: Air National Guard
- Type: Squadron
- Role: Fighter
- Part of: Wisconsin Air National Guard
- Garrison/HQ: Truax Field Air National Guard Base, Madison, Wisconsin
- Nickname: "Badger Air Militia"
- Equipment: F-35A Lightning II
- Engagements: World War II

Insignia
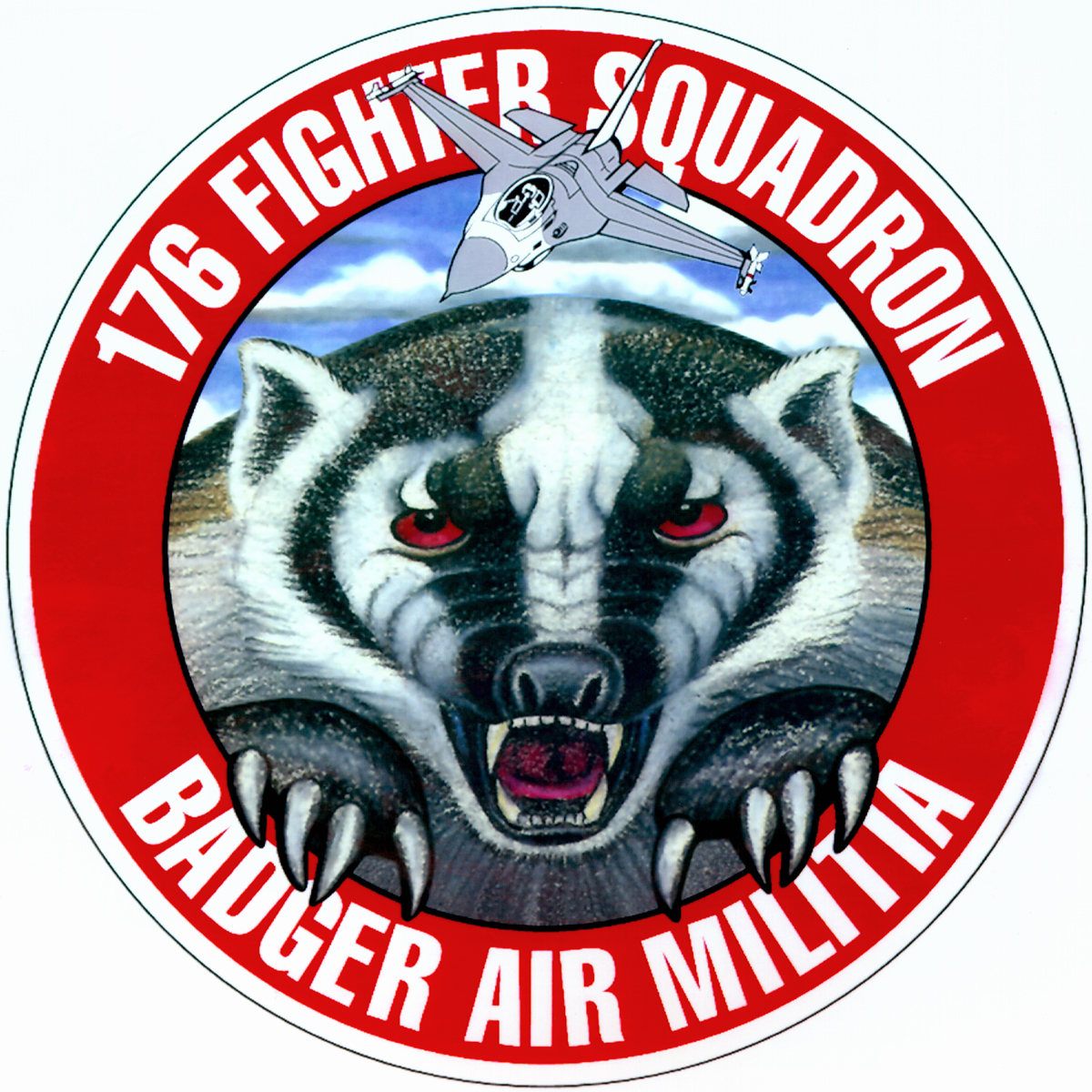
- 176th Fighter Squadron emblem

The 176th Fighter Squadron is a unit of the Wisconsin Air National Guard 115th Fighter Wing located at Truax Field Air National Guard Base, Madison, Wisconsin. The 176th is equipped with the Lockheed Martin F-35A Lightning II, with its first jets having arrived on 25 April 2023. The squadron previously operated the General Dynamics F-16C/D Fighting Falcon between 1993 and 2022.

== History ==
=== World War II ===
See 338th Bombardment Group for expanded World War II history

Activated in July 1942, the 306th Fighter Squadron was an advanced pilot training squadron, assigned to III Fighter Command at Dale Mabry Army Airfield, Florida. The 306th was an Operational Replacement Unit (OTU) which trained newly graduated pilots in combat fighter tactics with graduates being assigned to operational squadrons for combat in overseas theaters. Initially equipped with the P-39 Airacobra, later using P-47 Thunderbolts and P-51 Mustangs when they became available. Disbanded in May 1944 as part of a reorganization of Army Air Force training unit designations.

=== Wisconsin Air National Guard ===
The wartime 306th Fighter Squadron was reconstituted and re-designated as the 176th Fighter Squadron, and was allotted to the Wisconsin Air National Guard, on 24 May 1946. It was organized at Truax Field, Madison, Wisconsin and was extended federal recognition on 6 October 1948 by the National Guard Bureau. The 176th Fighter Squadron was entitled to the history, honors, and colors of the 306th. The squadron was equipped with F-51D Mustangs and was assigned to the new 128th Fighter Group, WI ANG at General Mitchell Field, Milwaukee.

==== Air Defense ====
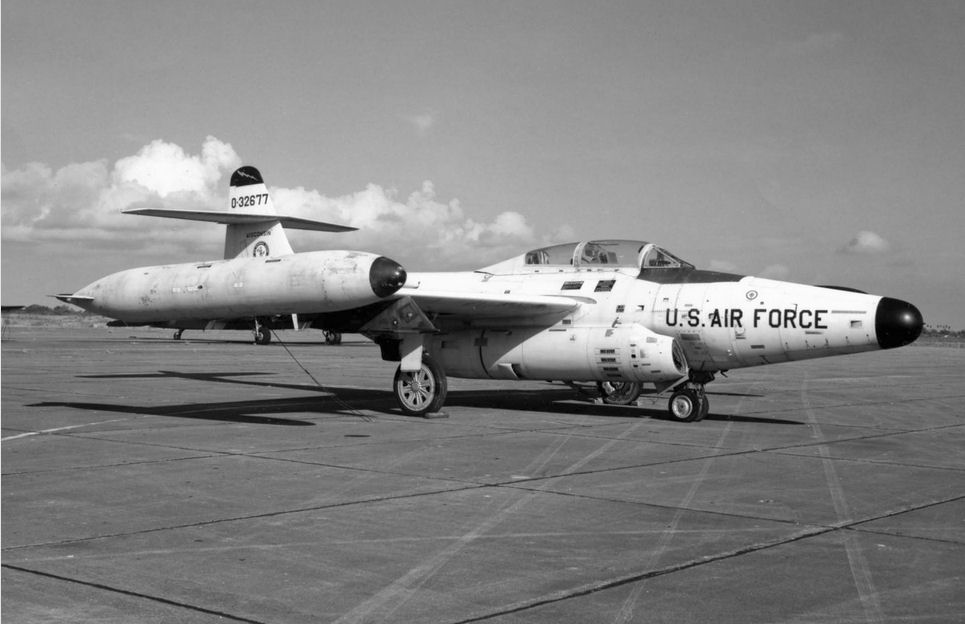
176th Fighter-Interceptor Squadron F-89J-70-NO 53-2677

The 176th was gained by Air Defense Command (ADC) with an air defense mission of the Great Lakes, Chicago and Wisconsin. Upgraded to F-80A Shooting Star jet aircraft in 1949. Was re-designated as the 176th Fighter-Interceptor Squadron in November 1950 and 10 of the unit's 25 Mustangs were shipped to Korea in support of the Korean War effort. Federalized during the Korean War in February 1951, but remained at Truax Field where it flew air defense training missions. During the active duty tour, the 176th converted its aircraft to the F-89 Scorpion. They became the first Air National Guard unit to fly the modern jet fighter. Returned to Wisconsin state control in February 1952 and converted back to the F-51 Mustang.

In October 1953, The 176th converted from F-51's to the F-86 Sabre, and the squadron performed summer training with the F-86 was at the Alpena Training Center in Alpena, Michigan in 1954. In October 1954 The 176 Fighter Squadron was reassigned the F-89 Scorpion, which they had flown briefly in 1952 during the unit's Korean War activation. The aircraft, designed as an "All Weather" fighter interceptor, carried a pilot and radar operator.

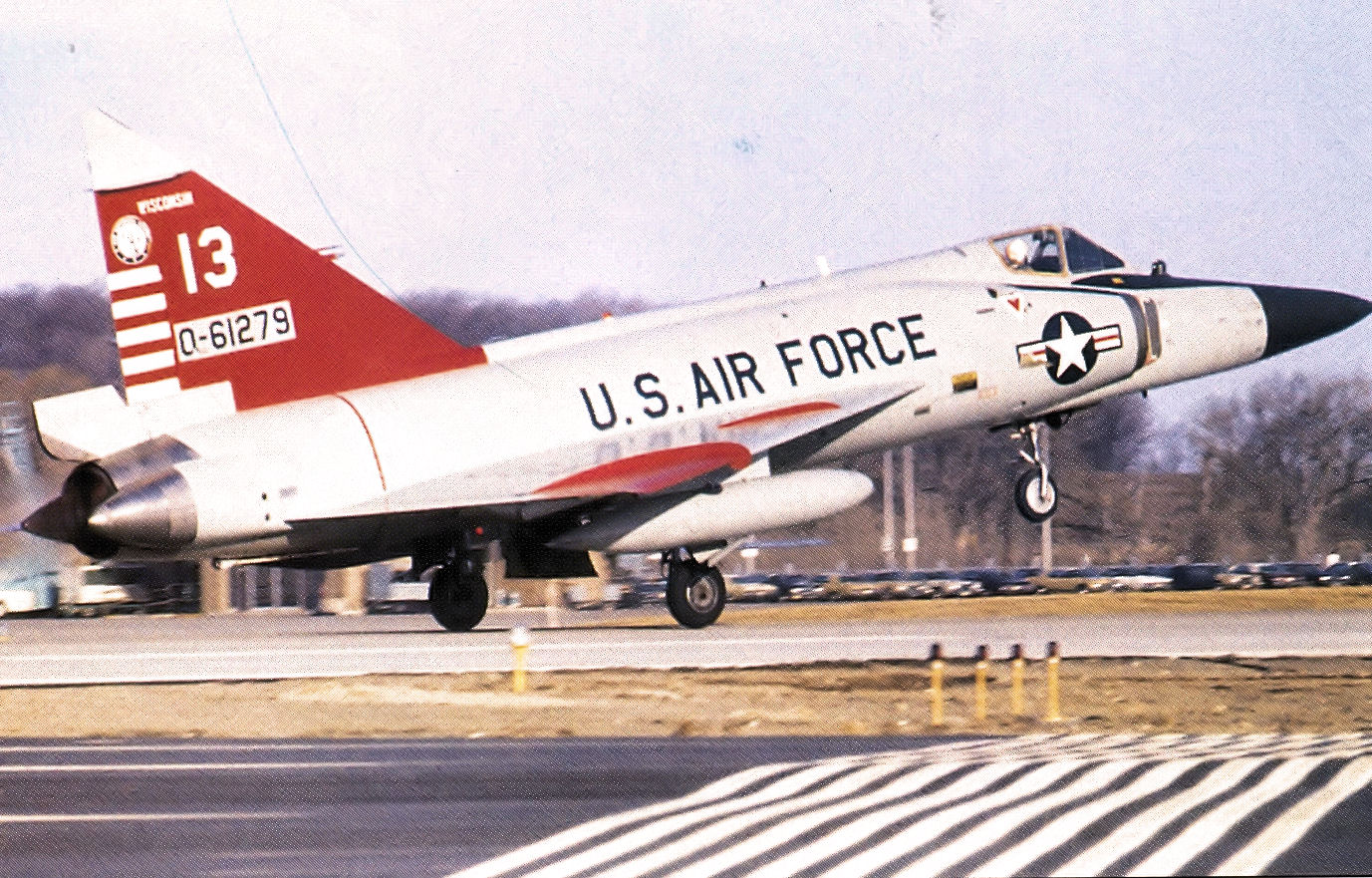
176th Fighter Interceptor Squadron Convair F-102A-75-CO Delta Dagger 56-1279 taking off from Truax Field, Wisconsin, 1970.

On 15 April 1956, the 176th FIS was authorized to expand to a group level, and the 115th Fighter-Interceptor Group was established by the National Guard Bureau at Truax Field. The 176th FIS becoming the group's flying squadron. The Group continued its air defense mission with summer training moved to Volk Field from 1956 to 1962. Beginning in 1963, training moved to "year around" training. In January 1960 F-89 crews were put on active duty status and the unit was assigned an around-the-clock runway alert commitment of two armed aircraft. Along with this commitment came the F-89J with an armament platform that included the AIR-2 Genie. The AIR-2A was the first US air-to-air rocket with a nuclear warhead. In early 1966 the squadron turned in their F-89's for the F-102 Delta Dagger.

In May 1966 the 176th FIS replaced their F-89's with the Convair F-102 Delta Dagger. In the spring of 1967 after a period of re-training in the new supersonic interceptors, the 176th FIS resumed its air defense "runway alert" mission. One year later in June 1969, the unit airlifted to Gulfport, Mississippi for summer training, ending six years of "year around" training at home base.

In September 1972, the 176th FIS won the William Tell Competition in the F-102 category. The event, held at Tyndall Air Force Base, included top Air National Guard, Royal Canadian Air Force and active US Air Force units worldwide. The competition included 12 teams of 48 aircraft, each team scored on aerial marksmanship, weapons control, weapons loading and maintenance.

==== Forward Air Control ====
In November 1974, the squadrons parent 115th Fighter-Interceptor Group was transferred from Air Defense Command to Tactical Air Command(TAC). In addition the 115th's status was elevated from a group to a Wing, its designation being changed to the 128th Tactical Air Support Wing in a re-alignment by the Wisconsin National Guard Bureau.

The squadron was re-designated as the 176th Tactical Air Support Squadron, and in December 1974 the unit's F-102's were replaced by the Cessna O-2A Skymaster forward air control (FAC) aircraft. The O-2 was the military version of the Cessna 337 Skymaster, a high wing, twin boom aircraft with a unique centerline pusher/tractor twin engine configuration. The O-2A version was used in FAC missions, often in conjunction with a ground FAC & ROMAD, (radio operator, maintenance, and driver), team.

In November 1979, the O-2s were replaced by the OA-37B Dragonfly FAC aircraft. It was developed from the A-37 light attack aircraft which was used extensively in the Vietnam War as a counter-insurgency aircraft, with the surviving aircraft either being sold to the Republic of Vietnam Air Force or returned to the United States. The OA-37s were received from ANG units in Maryland and New York.

With most of the pilots and maintenance crews having prior jet aircraft experience with the F-102's, the unit was able to transition the OA-37 to C-1 status, (full combat ready), in less than six months. Awards during the OA-37 era included an overall rating of "Excellent" in the unit's Operational Readiness Inspection (ORI), the Distinguished Flying Award and their first Air Force Outstanding Unit Award.

==== Close Air Support ====
On 1 October 1981, the 176th was redesignated the 176th Tactical Fighter Squadron. Along with the mission change came a new aircraft, the A-10 Thunderbolt II, nickname "Warthog", with the OA-37s being sent to other ANG units. For survivability made the A-10 an excellent weapons delivery system for ground targets. The A-10's most dominant feature is its seven barrel GAU-8/A 30mm cannon, capable of firing at up to 70 "tank busting" rounds per second.

During the A-10 era the unit received two Outstanding Unit Awards, three Air Force Flight Safety Awards, and in 1991 an "Outstanding" in its Unit Effectiveness Inspection (UEI). Deployments with the A-10 included Operation Coronet Cove to Panama, and "Checkered Flag" missions to NATO bases in West Germany and England.

==== F-16C/D (1993–2022) ====
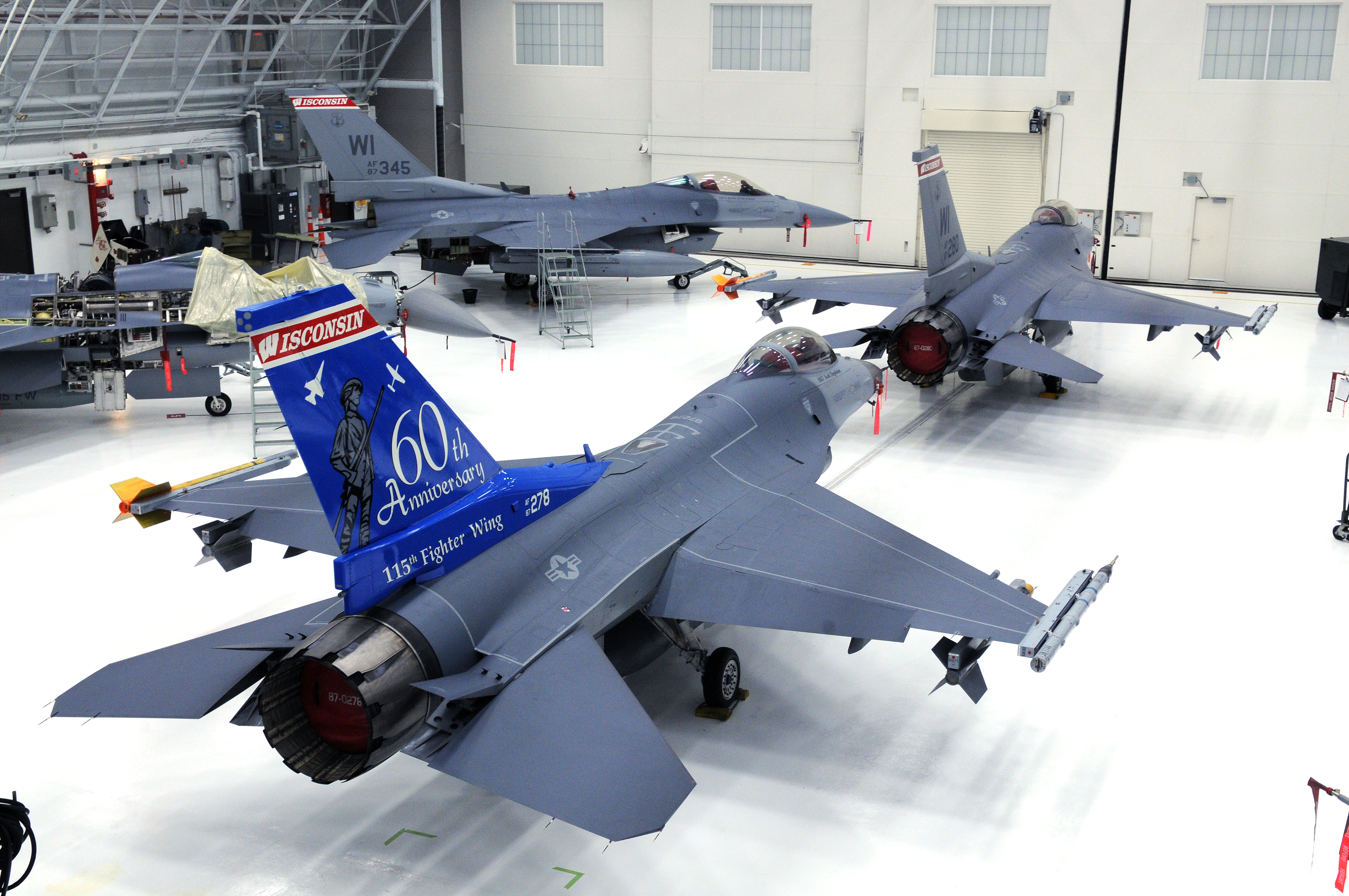
176th Fighter Squadron F-16C Fighting Falcons in the hangar at Truax Field, 2009

With the end of the Cold War, the early 1990s marked several changes. On 16 March 1992 the 176th Tactical Fighter Squadron (TFS) was redesignated the 176th Fighter Squadron as its parent 128th Tactical Fighter Wing became the 128th Fighter Wing. The 128th implemented the Air Force Objective Organization, which established the 128th Operations Group to which the 176th was assigned. Also occurring at this time was a command change from the Air Force's Tactical Air Command to the newly created Air Combat Command.

In 1993 the 176th began transitioning from the A-10A to the F-16C/D block 30 Fighting Falcon airframes with the enlarged inlet, with the A-10s were transferred out to other ANG units. The first F-16s arrived at Truax ANGB on 1 April 1993. The current role of the 176th FS is air-interdiction and close air support. This was the same task as when they flew the A-10. Although the transition to the F-16 meant a huge change in the overall execution of this mission when comparing the A-10 with an F-16.

On 11 October 1995, the squadron was reassigned to the new 115th Operations Group when its parent 128th Fighter Wing was redesignated to the 115th by the Wisconsin National Guard Bureau. The 128th designation was causing confusion with the 128th Air Refueling Wing at General Mitchell ANGB, another Wisconsin Air National Guard unit.

Operations participated in during this era include: Operation Coronet Chariot, Karup AS, Denmark 1994, Operation Northern Watch, Incirlik AB, Turkey 1997, Operation Southern Watch, Ahmad al-Jaber Air Base, Kuwait 1997–98, Operation Southern Watch, Prince Sultan AB, Saudi Arabia 1999, Operation Coronet Nighthawk, Curacao, Netherlands Antilles 2001, Operation Enduring Freedom, Al Udeid Air Base, Qatar 2004–05, and Operation Noble Eagle, 11 September 2001 to present.

In December 2017, the Air Force announced that the 176th was one of two Air National Guard squadrons selected for equipping with the Lockheed Martin F-35A Lightning II. The conversion to the fifth-generation jet fighter is scheduled for 2023.

On 5 October 2022, the 176th's last two F-16s (87-0278 and 88-0150) departed Truax Field ANGB in preparation to convert to the F-35A.

==== F-35A (2023–present) ====
On 25 April 2023, the first three of an eventual 20 F-35As arrived at Truax Field ANGB.

=== Lineage ===
Legacy 176th Fighter Squadron Emblem

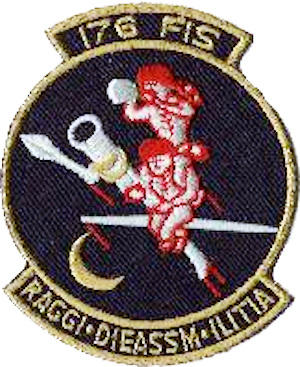
Legacy 176th Fighter-Interceptor Squadron Emblem

- Constituted 306th Fighter Squadron on 16 July 1942

Activated on 22 July 1942
Disbanded on 1 May 1944

- Reconstituted, redesignated 176th Fighter Squadron, and allotted to Wisconsin ANG, on 24 May 1946

Extended federal recognition and activated 6 October 1948
Redesignated 176th Fighter-Interceptor Squadron on 1 November 1950
Federalized and placed on active duty, 1 February 1951
Released from active duty and returned to Wisconsin state control, 1 November 1952
Redesignated 176th Tactical Air Support Squadron on 9 November 1974
Redesignated 176th Tactical Fighter Squadron on 15 November 1981
Redesignated 176th Fighter Squadron on 15 March 1992

=== Assignments ===
- 338th Fighter Group, 22 Jul 1942 – 1 May 1944
- 128th Fighter Group, 29 June 1948
- 128th Fighter-Interceptor Group, 1 November 1950
- 115th Fighter-Interceptor Group, 15 April 1956
- 115th Tactical Air Support Group, 9 November 1974
- 128th Tactical Air Support Wing, 9 November 1974
- 128th Tactical Fighter Wing, 15 November 1981
- 128th Operations Group, 15 March 1992
- 115th Operations Group, 11 October 1995

=== Stations ===
- Dale Mabry Army Airfield, Florida, 22 Jul 1942 – 1 May 1944.
- Truax Field, Wisconsin, 6 October 1948 – 1 November 1952
- Truax Field (later Truax Field Air National Guard Base), Wisconsin, 1 November 1952 – present

=== Aircraft ===
- Bell P-39 Airacobra, 1942–1943
- Curtiss P-40 Warhawk, 1942–1943, 1944
- Republic P-47 Thunderbolt, 1943–1944
- North American P-51 Mustang, 1943
- North American F-51D Mustang, 1948–1949; 1952–1953
- Lockheed F-80A Shooting Star, 1949–1952
- North American F-86A Sabre, 1953–1954
- Northrop F-89C Scorpion, 1954–1957
- Northrop F-89D Scorpion, 1957–1959
- Northrop F-89H Scorpion, 1959–1960
- Northrop F-89J Scorpion, 1960–1966
- Convair F-102A Delta Dagger, 1966–1974
- Cessna O-2 Skymaster, 1974–1979
- Cessna OA-37B Dragonfly, 1979–1981
- Fairchild A-10A Thunderbolt II, 1981–1993
- General Dynamics F-16C/D Fighting Falcon, 1993–2022
- Lockheed Martin F-35A Lightning II, 2023–present
