= 115th Fighter Wing =

115th Fighter Wing

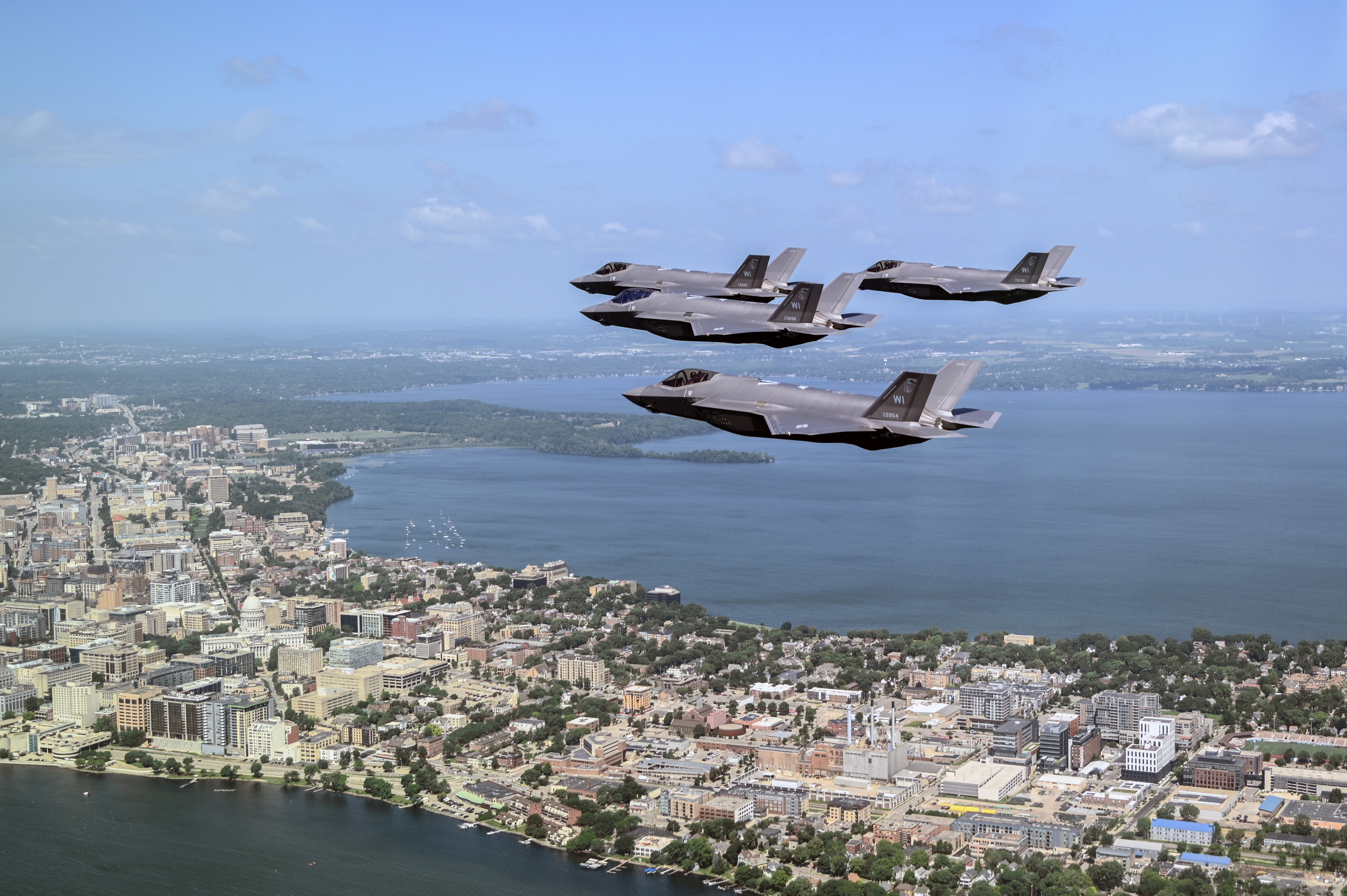
- 115th Fighter Wing F-35A Lightning IIs in flight over Madison, Wisconsin
- Active: 1950–1952; 1952–1958; 1961–present
- Country: United States
- Allegiance: Wisconsin
- Branch: Air National Guard
- Type: Wing
- Role: Fighter
- Part of: Wisconsin Air National Guard
- Garrison/HQ: Truax Field Air National Guard Base, Madison, Wisconsin
- Decorations: Air Force Outstanding Unit Award

Commanders
- Current commander: Colonel Benjamin M. Gerds

Insignia
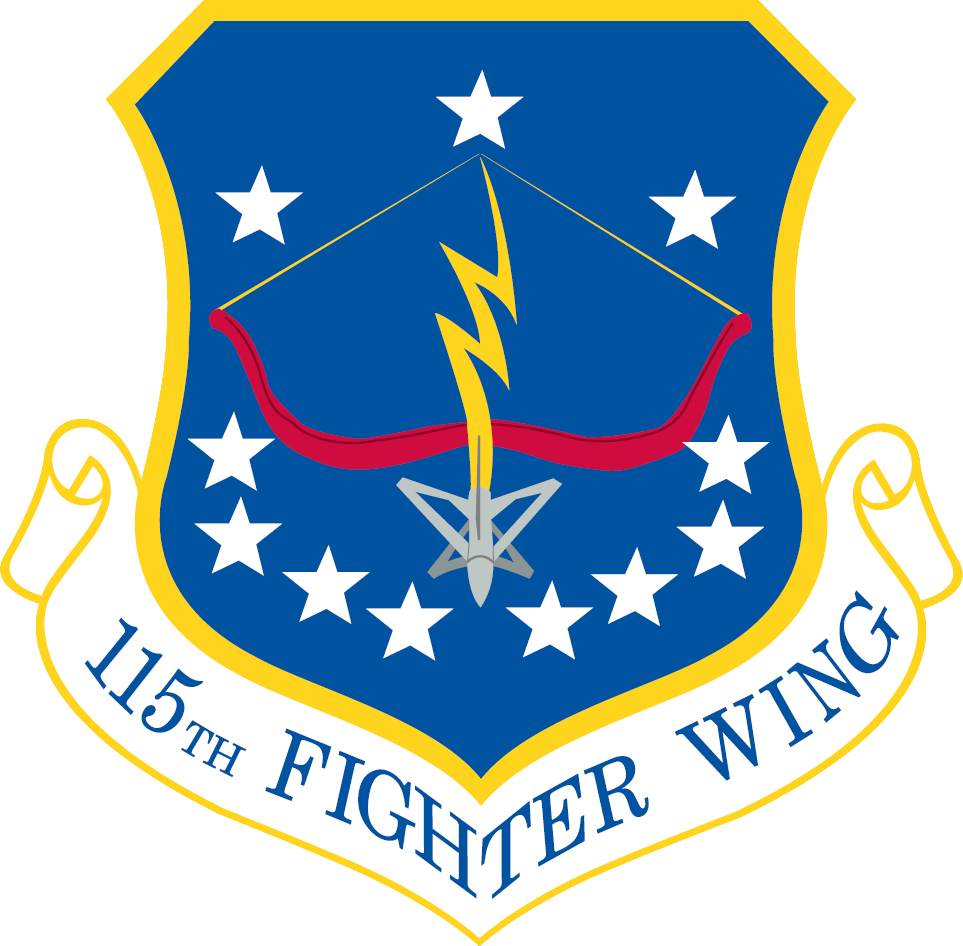
- 115th Fighter Wing emblem
- Tail code: WI
- Tail stripe: Red with "Wisconsin" in white letters

Aircraft flown
- Fighter: F-35A Lightning II

The 115th Fighter Wing is a unit of the Wisconsin Air National Guard, which is stationed at Truax Field Air National Guard Base, Madison, Wisconsin. If activated to federal service, the Wing is gained by the United States Air Force Air Combat Command.

As an Air National Guard unit, it is normally under the command of the Governor, but has a federal role as well. Currently the wing has personnel and/or aircraft assigned to Operation Noble Eagle, and has served on Operation Jump Start and the Air Expeditionary Force in Iraq and Afghanistan.

== Units ==
The 115th Fighter Wing consists of the following units:

- 176th Fighter Squadron
- 115th Operations Group
- 115th Mission Support Group
- 115th Maintenance Group
- 115th Medical Group

== History ==
The wing was first activated as the 128th Fighter Wing in November 1950, when the Air National Guard converted its units to the Wing Base organization, which placed operational and support units under a single wing. Four months later, the wing was federalized in the second wave of Air National Guard callups for the Korean War, and assigned to Air Defense Command. It moved to Truax Field near Madison, Wisconsin where both the 126th and 176th Fighter-Interceptor Squadron flew air defense training missions until being inactivated in February 1952. The wing returned to Wisconsin state control and to its station near Milwaukee in November.

=== Air defense ===
The wing trained for its air defense mission until 1958. It was again activated in April 1961, remaining in the air defense mission, although its original group at the same station assumed the air refueling mission. In June 1971, the squadron again moved from General Mitchell Field to Truax Field, where the 115th Fighter-Interceptor Group was located.

In September 1972, the wing's 176th Fighter-Interceptor Squadron won the "William Tell Competition" in the F-102 category. The event, held at Tyndall Air Force Base, included top Air National Guard, Canadian Air Force and active US Air Force units worldwide. The competition included 12 teams of 48 aircraft, each team scored on aerial marksmanship, weapons control, weapons loading and maintenance.

==== Forward air control ====
In November 1974, the wing's gaining command changed from Air Defense Command to Tactical Air Command (TAC) and its designation changed to the 128th Tactical Air Support Wing. With the realignment to TAC, in December 1974, the unit's F-102s were replaced by the Cessna O-2A Skymaster Forward Air Control (FAC) aircraft. The O-2 was the military version of the Cessna 337 Skymaster, a high wing, twin-boom aircraft with a unique centerline pusher/tractor twin engine configuration. The O-2A version was used in forward air control missions, often in conjunction with a ground forward air controller and a radio operator, maintenance, and driver (ROMAD) team.

In November 1979, the O-2s were replaced by the Cessna OA-37B Dragonfly forward air control aircraft. It was developed from the A-37 light attack plane which was used extensively in the Vietnam War as a counter-insurgency aircraft, with the surviving planes either being sold to the Republic of Vietnam Air Force or returned to the United States. The OA-37s were received from Air National Guard units in Maryland and New York.

With most of the pilots and maintenance crews having prior jet aircraft experience with the F-102s, the unit was able to transition the OA-37 to C-1 status, (full combat ready), in less than six months. Awards during the OA-37 era included an overall rating of "Excellent" in the unit's Operational Readiness Inspection, the Distinguished Flying Award and its first Air Force Outstanding Unit Award.

==== Close air support ====
On 1 October 1981, the group was redesignated the 128th Tactical Fighter Wing. Along with the mission change came a new aircraft, the Fairchild Republic A-10 Thunderbolt II, nicknamed the "Warthog". The OA-37s were sent to other Air National Guard units; its survivability made the A-10 an excellent weapons delivery system for ground targets. The A-10's most dominant feature is its seven-barrel GAU-8/A 30 mm cannon, capable of firing at up to 70 "tank busting" rounds per second.

During the A-10 era, the unit received two Outstanding Unit Awards, three Air Force Flight Safety Awards, and in 1991 an "Outstanding" in its Unit Effectiveness Inspection. Deployments with the A-10 included Operation Coronet Cove to Panama, and "Checkered Flag" missions to NATO bases in West Germany and England.

==== Current mission ====
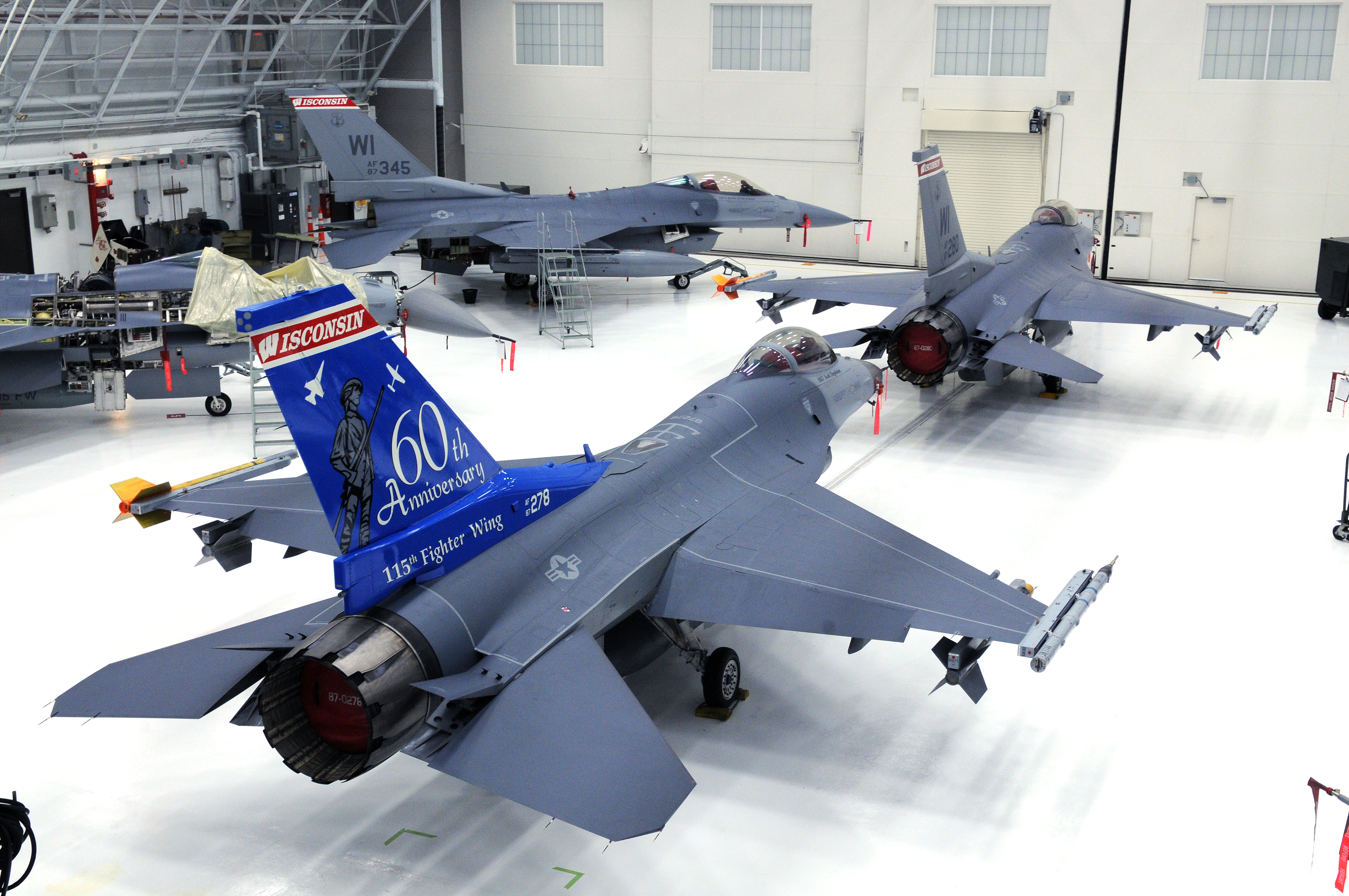
115th Fighter Wing F-16C Fighting Falcons in the hangar at Truax Field, Wisconsin. 2009

With the end of the Cold War, the early 1990s marked several changes. On 16 March 1992, the wing became the '128th Fighter Wing and shortly thereafter changed its mobilization command change from Tactical Air Command to the newly created Air Combat Command.

In 1993, the wing began transitioning from the A-10A to the F-16C/D block 30 Fighting Falcon airframes with the enlarged inlet, the A-10s were transferred to other Air National Guard units. The first F-16s arrived at Truax Air National Guard Base on 1 April 1993. The current role of the 176th FS is air-interdiction and close air support (CAS). This was the same task as when they flew the A-10, although the transition to the F-16 meant a huge change in the overall execution of this mission when comparing the A-10 with the F-16.

On 11 October 1995, the 128th Fighter Wing was renamed the 115th Fighter Wing and converted to the Objective Wing organization with its operational squadron assigned to the 115th Operations Group. The 128th designation duplicated that of the 128th Air Refueling Wing at General Mitchell Air National Guard Base, another Wisconsin Air National Guard unit, which upgraded from group status.

Operations participated in by the 115th Fighter Wing include: Operation Coronet Chariot, Karup AS, Denmark 1994, Operation Northern Watch, Incirlik Air Bace, Turkey 1997, Operation Southern Watch, Al Jaber AB, Kuwait 1997–98, Operation Southern Watch, Prince Sultan Air Base, Saudi Arabia 1999, Operation Coronet Nighthawk, Curacao, Netherlands Antilles 2001, Operation Enduring Freedom, Al Udeid Air Bace, Qatar 2004–05, Balad Air Base, Iraq, 2006, 08, & 09, Africa, 2013 and Operation Noble Eagle, from 11 September 2001 to the present.

In its 2005 Base Realignment and Closure Recommendations, the Department of Defense recommended to close Cannon Air Force Base, New Mexico. As a result, three of the 27th Fighter Wing's F-16s were to be distributed to the 115th Fighter Wing amongst other aircraft moves.

The 176th Fighter Squadron celebrated its 60th anniversary in October 2008.

Today the wing is capable of air-to-air, close air support and precision guided bombing missions. The wing operates the latest generation of munitions such as the JDAM series bombs and the AIM-9X air-to-air missile.

In December 2017, the Air Force announced that the 115th was one of two Air National Guard wings selected for equipping with the Lockheed Martin F-35 Lightning II. The conversion to the fifth-generation jet fighter is scheduled for 2023. In April 2023, Four F-35 fighter jets were delivered to the 115th fighter wing. Eventually, a total of 20 of those aircraft are scheduled to arrive at the air field in the next year.

== Lineage ==
- Established as the 128th Fighter Wing on 25 October 1950 and allotted to the Air National Guard

Activated on 1 November 1950 and given federal recognition
Federalized and called to active duty on 1 February 1951
Redesignated 128th Fighter-Interceptor Wing on 10 February 1951
Inactivated on 6 February 1952
Released from active duty, returned to Wisconsin state control and activated on 1 November 1952
Redesignated 128th Air Defense Wing on 15 April 1956
Inactivated on 10 March 1958
Activated on 1 August 1961

- Redesignated 128th Fighter-Interceptor Wing on 1 June 1972
- Redesignated 128th Tactical Air Support Wing on 9 November 1974
- Redesignated 128th Tactical Fighter Wing on 15 November 1981
- Redesignated 128th Fighter Wing on 15 March 1992
- Redesignated 115th Fighter Wing on 11 October 1995

=== Assignments ===
- Wisconsin Air National Guard, 1 November 1950
- Tenth Air Force, 1 February 1951
- Eastern Air Defense Force, 10 February 1951
- Central Air Defense Force, 20 May 1951 – 6 February 1952
- Wisconsin Air National Guard, 1 November 1952 – 10 March 1958
- Wisconsin Air National Guard, 1 April 1961 – present

Gaining commands

Air Defense Command, 1 November 1952 – 19 March 1958
Air Defense Command, 1 April 1961
Tactical Air Command, 9 November 1974
Air Combat Command, 1 June 1992 - present

=== Components ===
Groups

- 103d Tactical Fighter Group, 16 March 1992 – 11 October 1995
- 105th Tactical Air Support Group, 1 July 1979 – 1 May 1984
- 110th Tactical Air Support Group (later 110th Fighter Group), c. 1 June 1975 - 1983, c. 16 October 1991 – 11 October 1995
- 111th Tactical Air Support Group (later 111th Fighter Group), c. 1 June 1975 - 1983, 31 March 1992 – 11 October 1995
- 115th Fighter-Interceptor Group (later 115th Tactical Air Support Group, 115th Operations Group), 15 April 1956 – 10 May 1958, 1 June 1972 – 1 January 1979, 1 October 1994 - present
- 119th Fighter Group, 1 April 1961 - c. 1 June 1965
- 125th Fighter-Interceptor Group, c. 1 June 1972 - c. 1 October 1974
- 128th Fighter Group (later 128th Fighter-Interceptor Group, 128th Fighter Group), 1 November 1950 – 6 February 1952, 1 November 1952 – 10 March 1958
- 148th Fighter Group, 1 April 1961 - c. 1 January 1969
- 163d Tactical Air Support Group, 8 March 1975 - c. 1 October 1982
- 169th Fighter-Interceptor Group, 1 June 1972 – 5 April 1975
- 182d Tactical Air Support Group (later 182d Fighter Group), 1975 - 1 April 1995

Operational Squadron

- 176th Tactical Air Support Squadron (later 176th Tactical Fighter Squadron, 176th Fighter Squadron), 1 January 1979 – 1 October 1994

=== Stations ===
- Billy Mitchell Field, 1 November 1950
- Truax Field, Wisconsin, 16 February 1951 – 6 February 1952
- Billy Mitchell Field, 1 November 1952 – 10 March 1958
- Billy Mitchell Field, 1 April 1961
- Truax Field (later Truax Field Air National Guard Base, 1 June 1972 – present

=== Aircraft ===
- F-89C Scorpion, 1956–1957
- F-89D Scorpion, 1957–1959
- F-89H Scorpion, 1959–1960
- F-89J Scorpion, 1960–1966
- F-102A Delta Dagger, 1966–1974
- O-2 Skymaster, 1974–1979
- OA-37B Dragonfly, 1979–1981
- A-10 Thunderbolt II, 1981–1993
- F-16 Fighting Falcon, 1993–2022
- F-35 Lightning II, 2023–present
