= Operation Coronet Nighthawk =

Operation Coronet Nighthawk (1990–2001) was one of many operations that took place in the early 1990s to stop the drugs coming into the United States from Central and South America. The idea of the operation was to have a rotational deployment operation to intercept possible drug trafficking aircraft and to control territories where drug traffickers would not be able to smuggle more. The operation was based out of Howard Air Force Base in Panama and was moved all over the Caribbean and Central America. The Commander-in-Chief and US Atlantic Command oversaw this operation and, under the guidance of Joint Interagency Task Force East (JITF-E) division, stood alert 24/7 in case the need to identify an unknown aircraft came up. Operation Coronet Nighthawk is credited with over 33,000 metric tons of cocaine being disrupted or seized since 1994. This operation is no longer in use anymore since 2001, but the title was used again in a different operation that took place in Europe soon after it fell apart and incorporated the new stealth jets known as the Nighthawks thus why the name Nighthawk was used again.

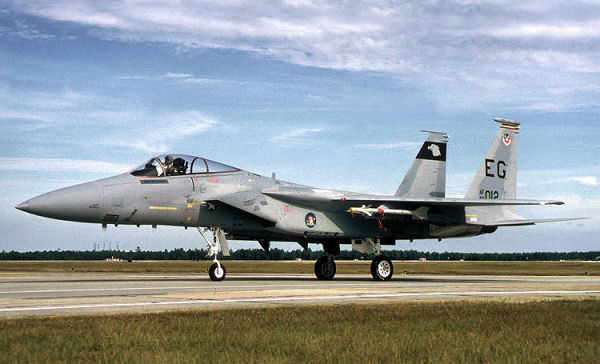
F-15 plane used during the operation

== Background ==
In the early 1990s and 1980s, the United States experienced a significant increase in drug trafficking and smuggling. Drugs were being smuggled by boat, car, over the border and even by plane. The US government decide to respond to this with operation Coronet Nighthawk. The title Coronet has been used in the military for many operations dating back to World War II with Operation Coronet, which was part of the Japanese downfall where they would land in Japan and await their surrender. A coronet is a small, simple crown and just like many of the coronet operations, they were mostly small operations that did not involve much fighting but surveillance and waiting. Nighthawk is an essential word in this operation since it relates to the drug planes that generally flew to the north of South American so they could reach they dropped points when it got dark. This made it difficult for the military to find them and then fly back home in the cover of the night which made it extremely hard for the military to find them.

== Panama base ==
Before Operation Coronet Nighthawk even began, the Air Defense Squad went to an airbase in Panama. Upon arrival, they would work for two to three months on their night operation skills before deployment. Once they completed their training, the pilots were ordered to look for any suspicious planes or ships, and to follow and observe them to see if they were making a delivery. If the pilots noticed something suspicious or observed any illegal activity, they were to follow the boat or plane back to where they originated from. The Air National Guard would then notify the local authorities of the ship or aircraft so that they could then go through and arrest the suspects and obtain more information. The military selected pilots whose were best able to intercept and shadow boats and planes without being spotted and to avoid flying into another country's airspace. This operation featured two different aircraft: the F-15 and F-16. Both planes are known for their ability to track and destroy planes as well as their maneuverability while in the air. The early and late hours of having to be on the clock twenty-four seven and since most of the time they would fly below clouds, they did not have any visual cues while flying. The F-16s were also known for their combat ability, but it was never used since they were not supposed to engage and to support an F-16 is very expensive. All the F-16s in this operation were never armed with any missiles or ammo because of this. Around two F-16s and 53 pilots and groundsmen from different units joined in this operation to help prevent unauthorized and unidentified aircraft from crossing the United States airspace illegally. Some after though, the operation would grow to 150 guardsmen and control 6 F-16s. In 1999, Operation Coronet Nighthawk ended at Howard AFB because of the Panama Canal Treaty. The Panama Canal Treaty was signed between the US and Panamanian government's and required the Panama Canal be turned over to Panama on 31 December 1999. The treaty also required the land and facilities of all military bases be turned over to Panama.

== Finding a new site ==
After the country of Panama kicked out the US had to find a new base of operation for Coronet Nighthawk. The operation was moved to Curaçao and Aruba near the Netherlands Antilles. Another choice was in Ecuador at the Manta Air Base. The base they moved to was also the international airport so most of the time they were sharing the space. During this time, they had completed 41 sorties, but two were scrubbed because of bad weather. They lived on the new base from January to February, taking on these missions. On the return home to the United States, some of the pilots were given an Air Force Outstanding Unit award. The award is only given to those who finish in the top ten percent of the Air Force in different performance ratings, and some men of operation coronet Nighthawk was lucky enough to receive it. After the operation was disbanded, the name was used in another operation using the new nighthawks planes being tested in Europe.

== Units featured ==
- Ohio Air Guard's 121st Air Refueling Wing (Rickenbacker ANGB) (2000)
- Texas Air Guard's 111th Fighter Squadron (1991, 6 weeks in the summer)
- New Jersey Air National Guard 177th Fighter Wing (November 1997)
- Vermont Air National Guard's 158th Fighter Wing (December 1997 – February 1998)
- Air National Guard's 119th Fighter Wing, “Happy Hooligans” (April 1999)
- New York Air National Guard's 107th Fighter Interceptor Group (1990-1991)
