= 78th Fighter Group =

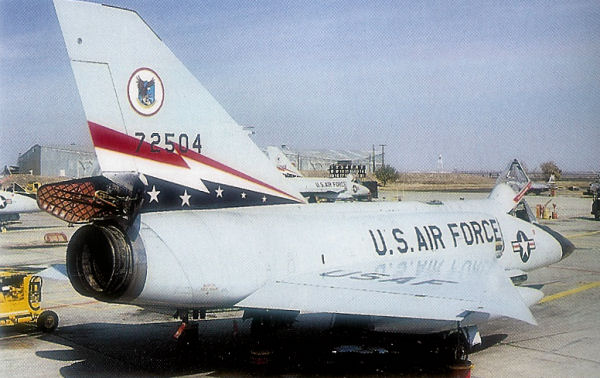
- F-106 Delta Dart of the group's 84th Fighter-Interceptor Squadron (Note: Aircraft is Convair F-106A-90-CO Dart Serial 57-2504.)
- Active: 1942–1945, 1946–1952, 1955–1961
- Country: United States
- Branch: United States Air Force
- Type: Air Defense
- Role: Fighter Interceptor
- Part of: Air Defense Command
- Motto: Above the Foe

Insignia
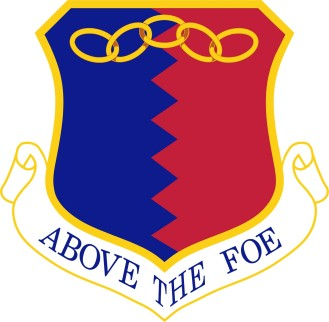
- Current form of the group emblem

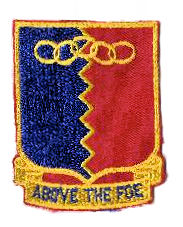
- Original form of the group emblem as approved 26 September 1942

The 78th Fighter Group (78 FG) is an inactive United States Air Force unit. It was last assigned to the 78th Fighter Wing, at Hamilton Air Force Base, California. It was inactivated on 1 February 1961.

During World War II the group was an Eighth Air Force fighter unit stationed in England assigned primarily to RAF Duxford. It claimed 338 air-to-air and 358 air-to-ground aircraft destroyed. It flew its last mission on 13 April 1945.

== History ==
=== World War II ===
The 78th Fighter Group was activated at Baer Field, IN as the 78th Pursuit Group in January 1942, receiving its cadre from the 14th Fighter Group. and re-designated as a fighter group four months later. It initially trained for combat with P-38s and served as part of the west coast air defense organization. It moved to England in November 1942 and was assigned to Eighth Air Force. The group lost its P-38s, and most of its pilots, in February 1943 when they were assigned to the Twelfth Air Force for service in the North African campaign.

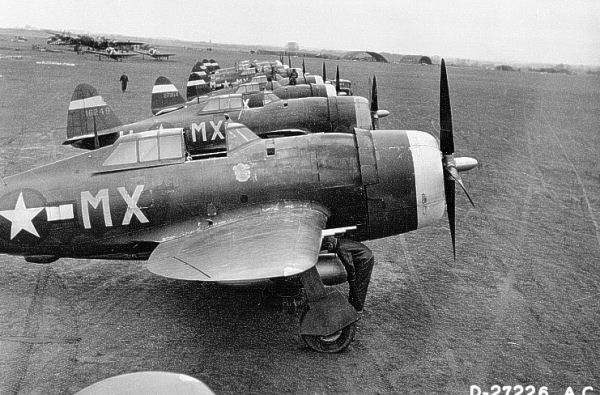
Republic P-47C-2-RE Thunderbolts of the 82d Fighter Squadron

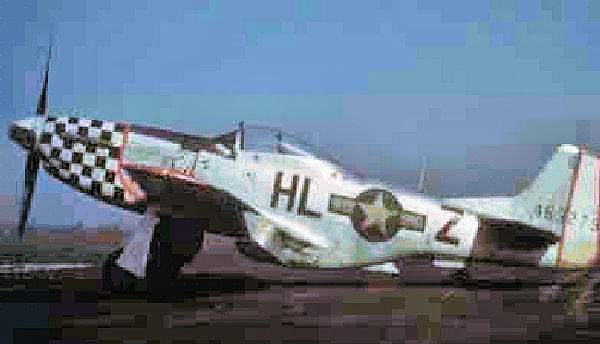
North American P-51D-20-NA Mustang of the 83rd Fighter Squadron

The group was reassigned to Duxford airfield in April 1943 and reequipped with Republic P-47 Thunderbolts. Aircraft of the group were identified by a black/white chequerboard pattern.

The group consisted of the following squadrons:

- 82d Fighter Squadron (MX)
- 83d Fighter Squadron (HL)
- 84th Fighter Squadron (WZ)

From Duxford, the 78th flew many missions to escort Boeing B-17 Flying Fortress and Consolidated B-24 Liberator bombers that attacked industries, submarine yards and docks, V-weapon sites, and other targets on the Continent. In 1943, the group had the first American ace in Eighth Air Force. The group also claimed a victory over a German Messerschmitt Me 262 jet fighter. The unit also engaged in counter-air activities and on numerous occasions strafed and dive-bombed airfields, trains, vehicles, barges, tugs, canal locks, barracks, and troops.

In addition to other operations, the 78th participated in the intensive campaign against the German Air Force and aircraft industry during Big Week, 20–25 February 1944 and helped to prepare the way for the invasion of France. The group supported the landings in Normandy in June 1944 and contributed to the breakthrough at Saint-Lô in July.

The group converted to North American P-51 Mustangs in December 1944 and participated in the Battle of the Bulge, from December 1944 to January 1945. It also supported the airborne assault across the Rhine in March.

The 78th Fighter Group received a Distinguished Unit Citation (DUC) for activities connected with the Operation Market-Garden combined ground and airborne attack through on the Netherlands in September 1944 when the group covered troop carrier and bombardment operations and carried out strafing and dive-bombing missions. It suffered its heaviest casualties of the war in this operation. The group received a second DUC for destroying numerous aircraft on five airfields near Prague and Pilsen on 16 April 1945.

The 78th Fighter Group returned to Camp Kilmer New Jersey in October 1945 and was inactivated on 18 October.

==== Commanders ====
- Col Arman Peterson, May 1942
- Lt Col Melvin F McNickle, Jul 1943
- Col James Stone Jr, 31 Jul 1943
- Col Frederic C Gray Jr, 22 May 1944
- Lt Col Olin E Gilbert, 29 Jan 1945
- Col John D Landers, c. 22 Feb 1945

=== Cold War ===
Occupation of Germany

The 78th FG was reactivated in Germany on 20 August 1946, replacing the 368th Fighter Group (which was inactivated, redesignated the 136th Fighter Group, and allotted to the National Guard) at AAF Station Straubing, Germany and flew the former 368th's P-47 Thunderbolts from the airfield. The group was reactivated due to the Air Force's policy of retaining only low-numbered groups on active duty after the war.

In Germany the group was assigned to the United States Air Forces in Europe's XII Tactical Air Command for duty with the occupation force. The group was assigned to AAF Station Straubing, The group was transferred, without personnel and equipment, to Mitchel Field, New York in June 1947.

Air Defense of the United States

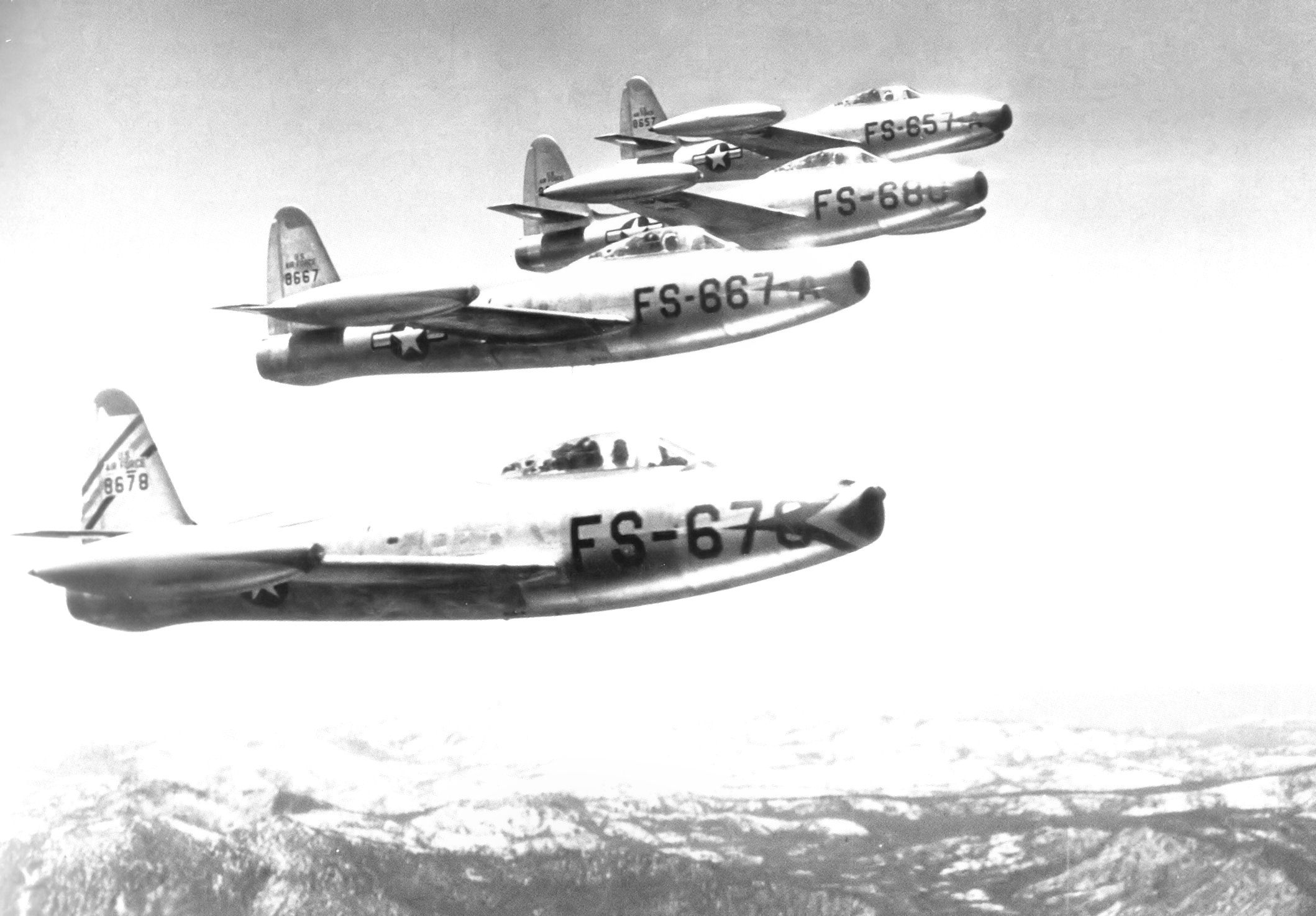
78th Fighter-Interceptor Group Republic F-84B Thunderjets, 1949 (Note: Aircraft are (bottom to top) Republic F-84D-10-RE Thunderjets 48-678, 48-667, 48-680, 48-657)

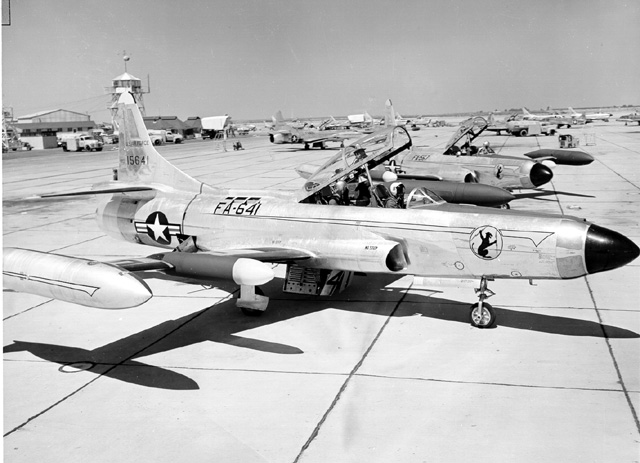
Lockheed F-94C of the 84th Fighter Interceptor Squadron (Note: Aircraft is Lockheed F-94C-1-LO Serial 59-641.)

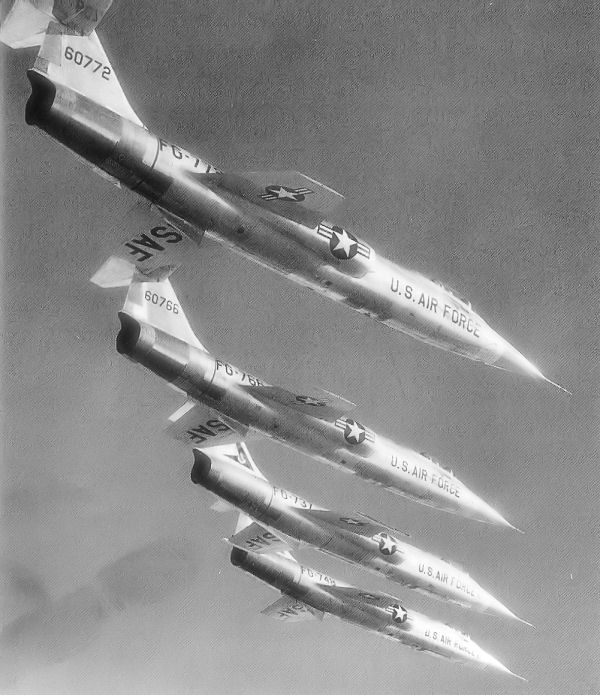
The 83d FIS show off their new Starfighters in 1958 (Note: Lockheed F-104A-15-LO Serials 56-772 and 56-776 are identifiable)

At Mitchel, the group remained active and was assigned to Air Defense Command (ADC). The group was manned with a small cadre of personnel, being equipped with a few P-51D Mustangs. On 16 November 1948, the 78th was reassigned to Hamilton AFB, California where it was assigned to ADC's Fourth Air Force. At that time the 78th Fighter Wing was established under Hobson Plan, and the 78th Fighter Group became the operational component of the wing, controlling its flying resources.

On 1 March 1949, the 78th Fighter Group received the first of the new production F-84 Thunderjets, with these aircraft going to the 82d, 83d and 84th Fighter Squadrons. The F-84s became problematic with cracks appearing in wing spars or skin beginning in September. The group lost four jets in accidents by the end of the year.

On 1 July 1949, Air Defense Command was inactivated as a major command, and Continental Air Command (ConAC) assumed the air defense mission. In January 1950 the wing and group were redesignated as the 78th Fighter-Interceptor Wing and 78th Fighter-Interceptor Group and the squadrons became Fighter-Interceptor Squadrons (FIS).

With the outbreak of the Korean War in June 1950, the 78th Fighter Group was the only remaining ConAC F-84 unit with an air defense commitment. The group lost many personnel which were reassigned to Far East Air Force units engaging in combat with deployed units. The personnel losses were replaced with less-experienced federalized Air Force Reserve or Air National Guard personnel. At the same time, ConAC placed the 78th Fighter Group on 24/7 air defense alert status, with the three squadrons rotating among themselves for one day on and two days off alert periods.

Throughout this period, the F-84s remained problematic with wing integrity, the group having only 50 of its authorized 70 aircraft operational, as a third of its aircraft had been sent to Republic Aircraft or Air Materiel Command depots for repairs. This led to excess hours being put on the remaining aircraft, reducing their designed operational life. By the first quarter of 1951, the number of operational aircraft on station was reduced to 44, with only 34 actually being combat ready. The manpower shortage was worse, with only seven of the forty combat-rated pilots being available, the remainder being assigned Europe or combat duty in Korea.

In June 1951, the 78th Fighter-Interceptor Group received the first four F-89B Scorpions, as a replacement for the F-84 Thunderjets. The Scorpions were assigned to the 83d and 84th FIS, while the 82d FIS retained the best of the groups remaining F-84s, while the remainder were either shipped as replacement aircraft to South Korea or sent to Republic for refurbishing.

By the end of 1951, the 82d FIS stood alert during daylight hours while the other two squadrons rotated night and foul weather duties. The F-89s, however, were rushed into service too rapidly. There were not enough trained pilots and radar operators, and there were not enough maintenance personnel who knew the intricacies of the complex and troublesome Hughes E-1 fire control system. The in-service rate of the F-89B was appallingly low, and crashes were all too frequently.

The 78th Fighter-Interceptor Group was inactivated along with the wing on 6 February 1952 along with its parent wing as part of a major ADC (Note: On 1 December 1950, ADC was reactivated and assumed the air defense mission from ConAC) reorganization, which replaced fighter wings organized under the Hobson Plan with regional defense wings. Its operational units were transferred to the 4702d Defense Wing and Hamilton was placed under the 566th Air Base Group. Two of the inactivated 78th's squadrons moved as ADC dispersed its fighter force. The 82d FIS moved to Larson AFB, Washington and was reassigned to the 4703d Defense Wing; the 83d FIS to Paine AFB, Washington and transferred to the 4704th Defense Wing. Only the 84th remained at Hamilton AFB.

The unit was reactivated in 1955 by replacing the 566th Air Defense Group at Hamilton AFB as part of ADC's Project Arrow, which reactivated fighter units that had achieved distinction in the two world wars. The 84th FIS, already at Hamilton was assigned to it and the 83d FIS returned without personnel or equipment to Hamilton, and was reassigned to the group, taking over the personnel and equipment of the 325th FIS which moved without personnel or equipment to Truax Field, Wisconsin. (Note: Project Arrow also reunited groups with their traditional squadrons. Buss, et al.) The group also became the host for Hamilton AFB and was assigned a number of support organizations to fulfil this mission. On 18 October 1956, the 78th Fighter Wing was once again activated and the group transferred its maintenance and support functions to the wing. The group flew numerous interceptors for West Coast air defense until its inactivation on 1 February 1961 when group components were assigned directly to the 78th Fighter Wing as the 78th converted to the dual deputy organization.

=== Lineage ===
- Constituted as the 78th Pursuit Group (Interceptor) on 13 January 1942

Activated on 9 February 1942
Redesignated 78th Fighter Group (Twin Engine) on 15 May 1942
Redesignated 78th Fighter Group, ca. 1 March 1943
Redesignated 78th Fighter Group, Single Engine, ca. 21 August 1944
Inactivated on 18 October 1945.

- Activated on 20 August 1946

Redesignated 78th Fighter Group, Jet ca. 16 November 1948
Redesignated 78 Fighter-Interceptor Group on 20 January 1950
Inactivated on 6 February 1952
Redesignated 78th Fighter Group (Air Defense), and activated 18 August 1955
Inactivated on 1 February 1961

=== Assignments ===
- IV Fighter Command, 9 February 1942
- VIII Fighter Command, 29 November 1942.
- 4th Air Defense Wing, 30 June 1943
- 65th Fighter Wing, 7 August 1943.
- 66th Fighter Wing, 18 August 1943.

Attached to: 3d Bombardment (later Air) Division, 5 September 1944 – 10 October 1945

- XII Tactical Air Command, 20 August 1946 – 15 June 1947
- Fourth Air Force, 30 June 1947
- 78th Fighter Wing (later 78th Fighter-Interceptor Wing), 16 November 1948 – 6 February 1952
- 28th Air Division, 18 August 1955 – 18 October 1956
- 78th Fighter Wing (Air Defense), 18 October 1956 – 1 February 1961

=== Components ===
Operational Squadrons

- 82d Pursuit (later Fighter, Fighter-Interceptor) Squadron: 9 February 1942 – 18 October 1945; 20 August 1946 – 6 February 1952; attached 18 October 1956 – 1 July 1960
- 83d Pursuit (later Fighter, Fighter-Interceptor) Squadron: 9 February 1942 – 18 October 1945; 20 August 1946 – 6 February 1952; 18 August 1955 – 1 February 1961
- 84th Pursuit (later Fighter, Fighter-Interceptor) Squadron: 9 February 1942 – 18 October 1945; 20 August 1946 – 6 February 1952; 18 August 1955 – 1 February 1961

Support Units

- 78th USAF Hospital, 18 August 1955 – 18 October 1956
- 78th Air Base Squadron 18 August 1955 – 18 October 1956
- 78th Air Police Squadron, 18 August 1955 – 18 October 1956
- 78th Food Service Squadron, 18 August 1955 – 18 October 1956
- 78th Field Maintenance Squadron, 18 August 1955 – 19 October 1956
- 78th Installations Squadron, 18 August 1955 – 18 October 1956
- 78th Motor Vehicle Squadron, 18 August 1955
- 78th Operations Squadron, 18 August 1955 – 18 October 1956
- 78th Supply Squadron, 18 August 1955 – 18 October 1956

=== Stations ===
- Baer Field, Indiana 9 February 1942
- Muroc Army Air Field, California 30 April 1942
- Hamilton Field, California May–November 1942
- RAF Goxhill (USAAF Station 345), England December 1942
- RAF Duxford (USAAF Station 357), England April 1943 – October 1945
- Camp Kilmer, New Jersey, 16–18 October 1945
- AAF Station Straubing, Germany, 20 August 1946 – June 1947
- Mitchel Field, New York June 1947
- Hamilton Air Force Base, California November 1948 – 6 February 1952; 18 August 1955 – 1 February 1961

=== Awards and campaigns ===
Award streamer	Award	Dates	Notes
	Distinguished Unit Citation	17 September 1944–24 September 1944	78th Fighter Group, the Netherlands
	Distinguished Unit Citation	16 April 1945	78th Fighter Group, Czechoslovakia

Campaign Streamer	Campaign	Dates	Notes
	Air Offensive, Europe	December 1942-5 June 1944	78th Fighter Group
	Normandy	6 June 1944 – 24 July 1944	78th Fighter Group
	Northern France	25 July 1944 – 14 September 1944	78th Fighter Group
	Rhineland	15 September 1944 – 21 March 1945	78th Fighter Group
	Ardennes-Alsace	16 December 1944 – 25 January 1945	78th Fighter Group
	Central Europe	22 March 1944 – 21 May 1945	78th Fighter Group
	Air Combat, EAME Theater	December 1942-11 May 1945	78th Fighter Group
	World War II Army of Occupation (Germany)	20 August 1946 – June 1947	78th Fighter Group

=== Aircraft ===
- Lockheed P-38 Lightning (1942–43)
- Republic P-47 Thunderbolt (1943–44, 1946)
- North American P-51 Mustang (1944–45, 1946–1947, 1949–52)
- Republic F-84 Thunderjet (1949–52)
- Northrop F-89 Scorpion (1951–52, 1956–59)
- North American F-86 Sabre (1956–58)
- Convair F-102 Delta Dagger (1957–60)
- Lockheed F-104 Starfighter (1958–60)
- McDonnell F-101 Voodoo (1959–61)
- Convair F-106 Delta Dart (1959–60)

== See also ==
- Aerospace Defense Command Fighter Squadrons
