= 83d Fighter Weapons Squadron =

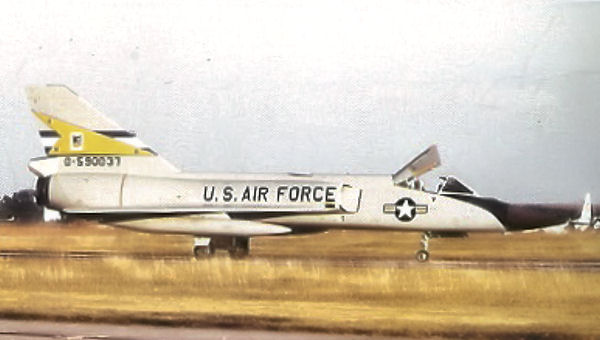
- Squadron F-106 at Loring Air Force Base in 1972
- Active: 1942–1945; 1946–1969; 1971–1972; 1972–1977; 1991–present
- Country: United States
- Branch: United States Air Force
- Role: Fighter weapons training
- Engagements: European Theater of Operations
- Decorations: Distinguished Unit Citation; Air Force Outstanding Unit Award

Insignia
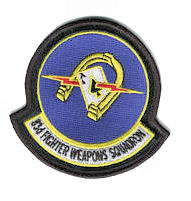
- Patch with 83d Fighter Weapons Squadron emblem (approved 9 May 1956) (Note: This emblem was used by the squadron during World War II; Watkins, p. 48; although not formally approved until the 1950s.)

The 83d Fighter Weapons Squadron is a United States Air Force unit, assigned to the 53rd Weapons Evaluation Group and stationed at Tyndall Air Force Base, Florida.

== Mission ==
The 83d Fighter Weapons Squadron is a non-flying unit that conducts the Air Force Air-to-Air Weapon System Evaluation Program (WSEP), known as COMBAT ARCHER. The squadron evaluates the total air-to-air weapons system including aircraft, weapon delivery system, weapon, aircrew, support equipment, technical data and maintenance actions. The squadron hosts 38 air-to-air WSEP deployments annually at Tyndall Air Force Base Florida.

The annual firing of 300 missiles evaluates all Air Force air-to-air missile capabilities for the AIM-120 Advanced Medium Range Air-to-Air Missile, AIM-7 Sparrow missile, AIM-9 Sidewinder missile and aircraft guns, and also provides live missile training for combat Air Force crews as a secondary objective. Squadron personnel verify weapon system performance, determine reliability, evaluate capability and limitations, identify deficiencies, recommend corrective action, and maintain Combat Air Force-wide data.

The squadron investigates missile envelopes and evaluates capabilities and limitations to determine future firing requirements. They provide liaison support for pre-deployment, employment, and redeployment of Air Combat Command, United States Air Forces Europe, Pacific Air Forces, Air National Guard, Air Force Reserve Command and Canadian forces participating in WSEP, William Tell and WIC missile firing programs.

== History ==
=== World War II ===
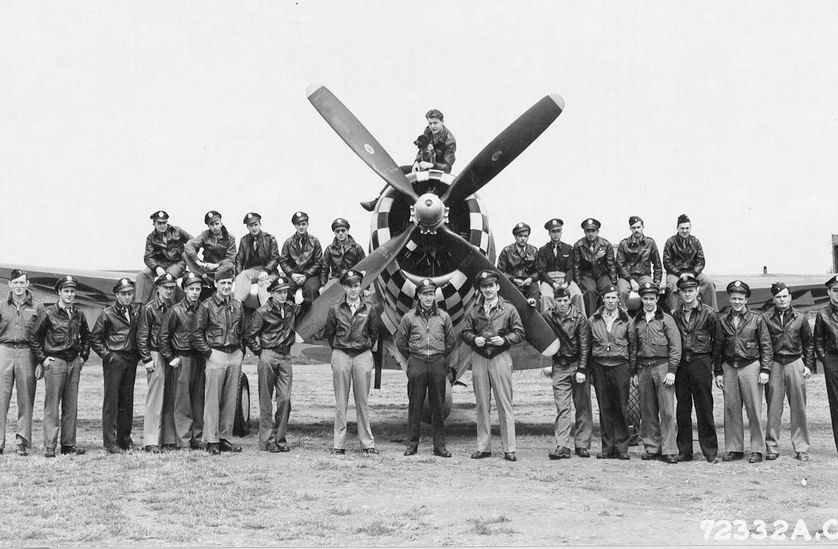
Pilots of the 83rd Fighter Squadron, 78th Fighter Group, 8th Air Force on 5 July 1944.

It was established in early 1942 as a IV Fighter Command squadron, and equipped with Lockheed P-38 Lightnings. After training in California it was deployed overseas to the European Theater of Operations in England. It was assigned to RAF Goxhill for European transition training with the Royal Air Force, and then assigned to its operational station at RAF Duxford. It was assigned to VIII Fighter Command for heavy bomber escort duties of Boeing B-17 Flying Fortress and Consolidated B-24 Liberators, engaged in long range strategic bombardment of military and industrial targets in Occupied Europe and Nazi Germany. It engaged in air-to-air combat with Luftwaffe interceptors over France and the Low Countries; the extended range of the P-38 could not extend over Germany. It replaced P-38s with Republic P-47 Thunderbolts in mid-1943; later with North American P-51D Mustangs in 1944 which enabled the squadron to fly escort missions deep into Germany and also engage in fighter sweeps over enemy airfields, bridges, railroads, road transport and other targets of opportunity. It continued combat operations until the German capitulation in May 1945.

The squadron demobilized in England during the summer of 1945, returned to the United States and was inactivated largely as a paper unit in October 1945. It was reactivated by the United States Air Forces in Europe in 1946 as an occupation unit at Army Air Force Station Straubing, Germany in 1946–1947.

=== Air Defense Command ===
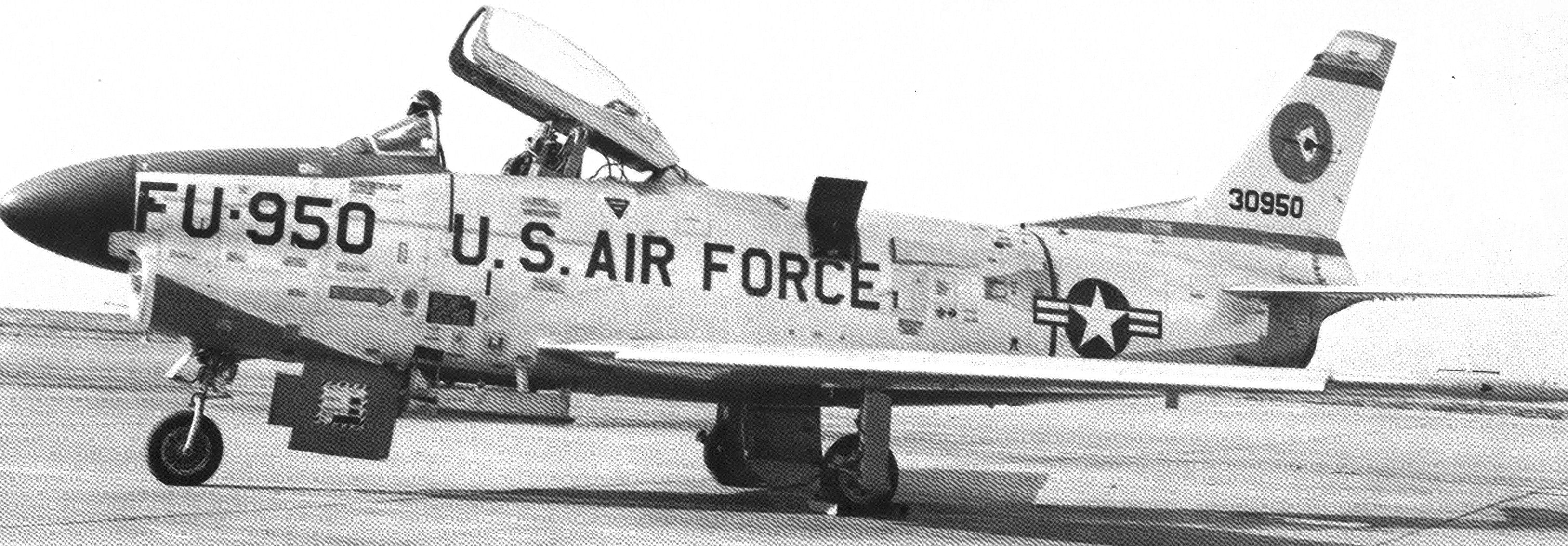
North American F-86L Sabre 53–0950, at Hamilton AFB in 1957

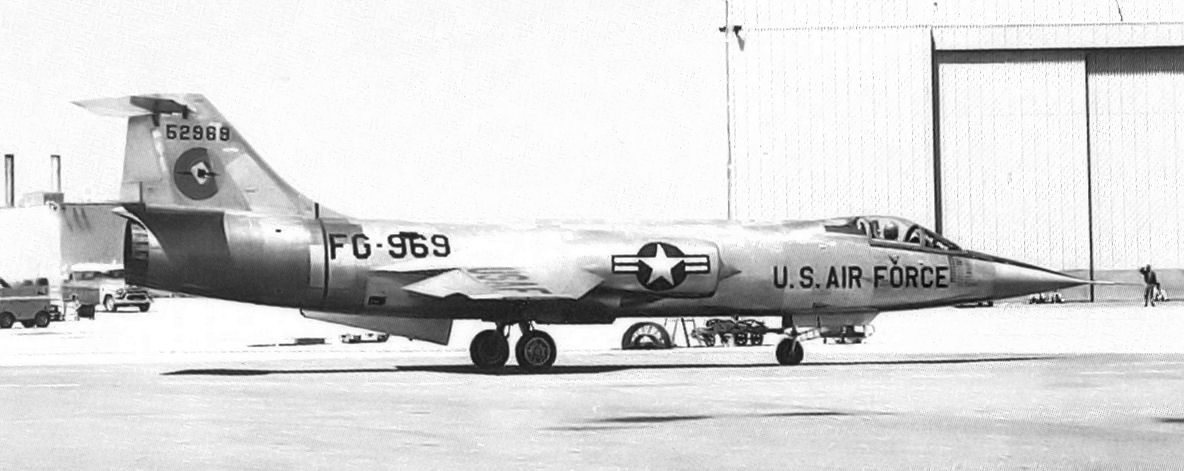
83d FIS YF-104A Starfighter 55-2969 deployment to operational service

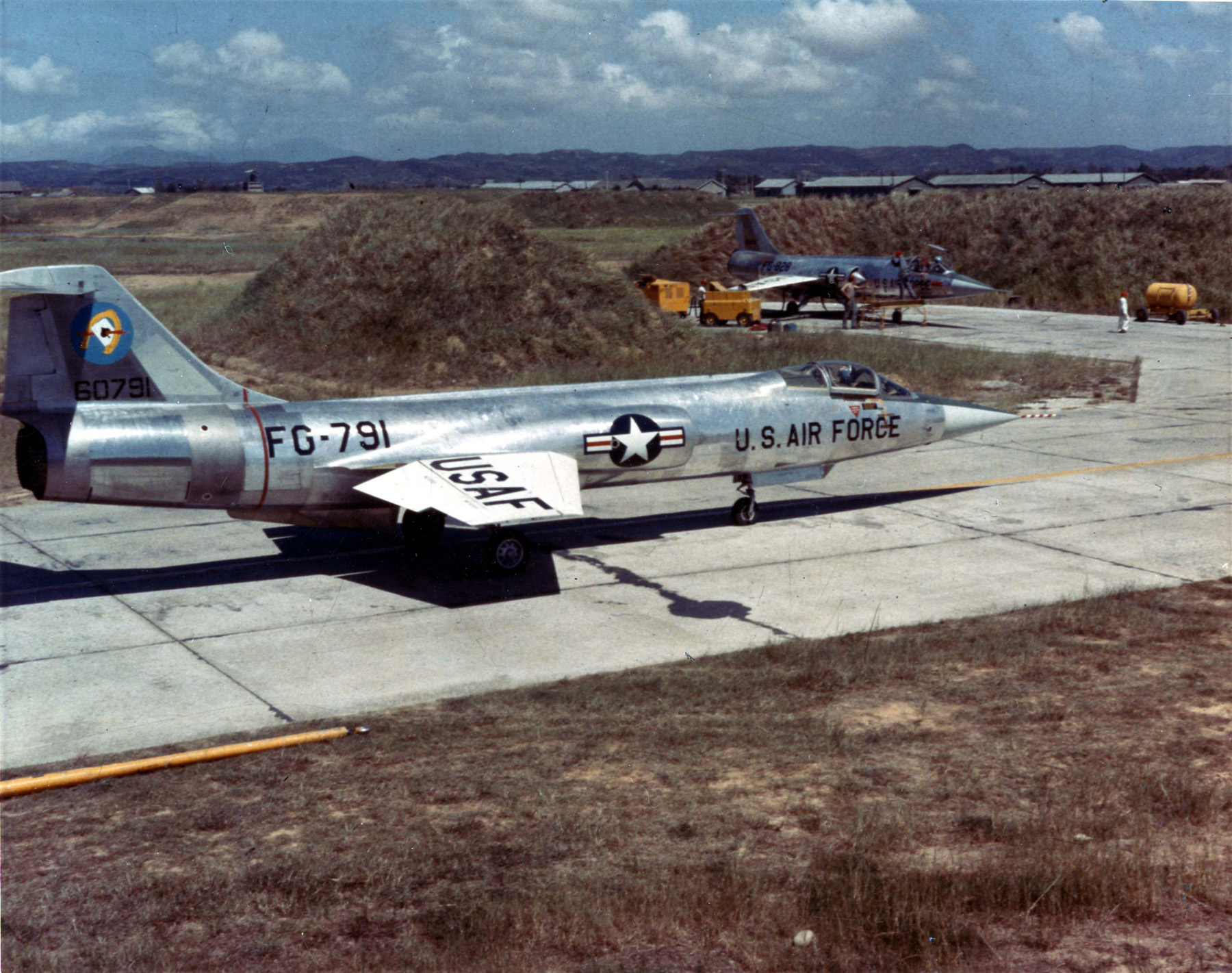
83d FIS F-104 56-0791 Deployed to Taiwan during 1958 Quemoy Crisis

The 83d was transferred from USAFE to Air Defense Command (ADC) in June 1947, and stationed at Mitchell Field, New York. Prior to being equipped it was transferred to Hamilton Air Force Base, California, where it received F-51D Mustangs and Republic F-84B Thunderjets. In the fall of 1950 it was upgraded to F-84Ds, and in August 1951 it transitioned into Northrop F-89B Scorpions. In July 1952 the squadron moved to Paine Field, Washington, and received North American F-86D Sabres. In August 1955 the 83d FIS designation was transferred back to Hamilton to another F-86D squadron, and the organization at Paine Field was reassigned.

In December 1957, the 83d received AIM-9 Sidewinder-armed Lockheed F-104 Starfighters and become the first operational F-104 squadron in ADC. In addition, the squadron received the two-seat, dual-control combat trainer F-104B. The performance of the F-104B was almost identical to that of the F-104A, but the lower internal fuel capacity reduced its effective range considerably.

It was found that the F-104A was not very well-suited for service as an interceptor. ADC released all its F-104s to the Air National Guard in 1960 because its fire control system was not sophisticated enough to operating in conjunction with the Semi-Automatic Ground Environment system to make it an all-weather interceptor.

Service with the F-104s was consequently quite brief, and the Starfighters were replaced by the more heavily armed all-weather McDonnell F-101B Voodoo in July 1960. The F-101B proved to be a quite successful interceptor. Assigned alongside the F-101B interceptor was the F-101F operational and conversion trainer. The two-seat trainer version was equipped with dual controls, but carried the same armament as the F-101B and were fully combat-capable.

On 22 October 1962, before President John F. Kennedy told Americans that missiles were in place in Cuba, the squadron dispersed one-third of its force, equipped with nuclear-tipped missiles, to Kingsley Field at the start of the Cuban Missile Crisis. These planes returned to Hamilton after the crisis.

Although the number of ADC interceptor squadrons remained almost constant in the early 1960s, the number of planes assigned to each squadron gradually dropped from 24 to typically 18 by 1964. This drop a result of aircraft attrition as well as the fact that production lines had closed in 1961. The 83d was inactivated to make up for attrition losses of F-101s in other units, but six aircraft remained at Hamilton as the 84th Fighter-Interceptor Squadron strength increased from 18 to 24 Voodoos.

The 83d was reactivated at Loring Air Force Base, Maine, in July 1971 when it absorbed the mission, personnel, and Convair F-106 Delta Darts of the 27th Fighter-Interceptor Squadron. The 83d was inactivated in June 1972 as part of the draw-down of Air Defense Command.

=== Training and weapons evaluation ===
It was reactivated in 1972 as a Northrop T-38 Talon Undergraduate Pilot Training squadron at Webb Air Force Base, Texas. It was inactivated with the closing of Webb in 1977. It was reactivated at Tyndall Air Force Base, Florida as a weapons evaluation squadron in 1983.

== Lineage ==
- Constituted as the 83d Pursuit Squadron (Interceptor) on 13 January 1942
- Activated on 9 February 1942

Redesignated 83d Fighter Squadron on 15 May 1942

- Inactivated on 18 October 1945
- Activated on 20 August 1946

Redesignated 83d Fighter-Interceptor Squadron on 20 January 1950
Redesignated 83d Fighter-Day Squadron on 18 November 1956
Redesignated 83d Fighter-Interceptor Squadron on 8 February 1957

- Inactivated on 1 July 1963
- Activated on 1 July 1971
- Inactivated on 30 June 1972

Redesignated 83d Flying Training Squadron on 28 July 1972

- Activated on 1 December 1972
- Inactivated on 30 September 1977

Redesignated 83d Fighter Weapons Squadron on 14 October 1983

- Activated on 15 October 1983

=== Assignments ===
- 78th Pursuit Group (later Fighter Group), 9 February 1942 – 18 October 1945
- 78th Fighter Group (later Fighter-Interceptor Group), 20 August 1946
- 4702d Defense Wing, 6 February 1952
- 4704th Defense Wing, 1 August 1952
- 529th Air Defense Group, 16 February 1953
- 78th Fighter Group, 18 August 1955 (attached to 13th Air Task Force, 15 September 1958 – 20 December 1958)
- 78th Fighter Wing, 1 February 1961 – 1 July 1963
- 21st Air Division, 1 July 1971 – 30 June 1972
- 78th Flying Training Wing, 1 December 1972 – 20 September 1977
- USAF Air Warfare Center, 23 January 1991
- 475th Weapons Evaluation Group (later 53rd Weapons Evaluation Group), 1 October 1991 (Note: The squadron was assigned to the 479th Group until 20 November 1998, then reassigned to the 53d Weapons Evaluation Group. However, the two groups were consolidated on 25 July 2000. Robertson, Factsheet 53 Weapons Evaluation Group.)

=== Stations ===
- Baer Field, Indiana, 9 February 1942
- Muroc Army Air Field, California, 30 April 1942
- Mills Field, California, 10 May 1942
- Hamilton Field, California, 23 June 1942 – 10 November 1942
- RAF Goxhill (Station 345), England, 1 December 1942
- RAF Duxford (Station 357), England, 1 April 1943 – 11 October 1945
- Camp Kilmer, New Jersey, 16 October 1945 – 18 October 1945
- AAF Station Straubing (R-68), Germany, 20 August 1946 – 25 June 1947
- Mitchel Field (later Mitchel Air Force Base), New York, 25 June 1947
- Hamilton Air Force Base, California, 24 November 1948
- Paine Air Force Base, Washington, 27 July 1952
- Hamilton Air Force Base, California, 19 August 1955 – 31 December 1969 (operated from Taoyuan Air Base, Taiwan, September – December 1958)
- Loring Air Force Base, Maine, 1 July 1971 – 30 June 1972
- Webb Air Force Base, Texas, 1 December 1972 – 30 September 1977
- Tyndall Air Force Base, Florida, 23 January 1991 – present

=== Aircraft ===
- Lockheed P-38 Lightning, 1942–1943
- Republic P-47 Thunderbolt, 1943–1944
- North American P-51 Mustang, 1944–1945; 1949–1951
- Republic F-84 Thunderjet, 1949–1951; 1953
- Northrop F-89B Scorpion, 1951–1952; 1955–1958
- North American F-86D Sabre, 1953–1957
- North American F-86L Sabre, 1957–1958
- Lockheed F-104 Starfighter, 1958–1960
- McDonnell F-101B Voodoo, 1960–1969
- Convair F-106 Delta Dart, 1970–1972
- Cessna T-37 Tweet, 1972–1977
- Northrop T-38 Talon, 1972–1977

== See also ==
- Aerospace Defense Command Fighter Squadrons
- Advanced Landing Ground
