= 84th Flying Training Squadron =

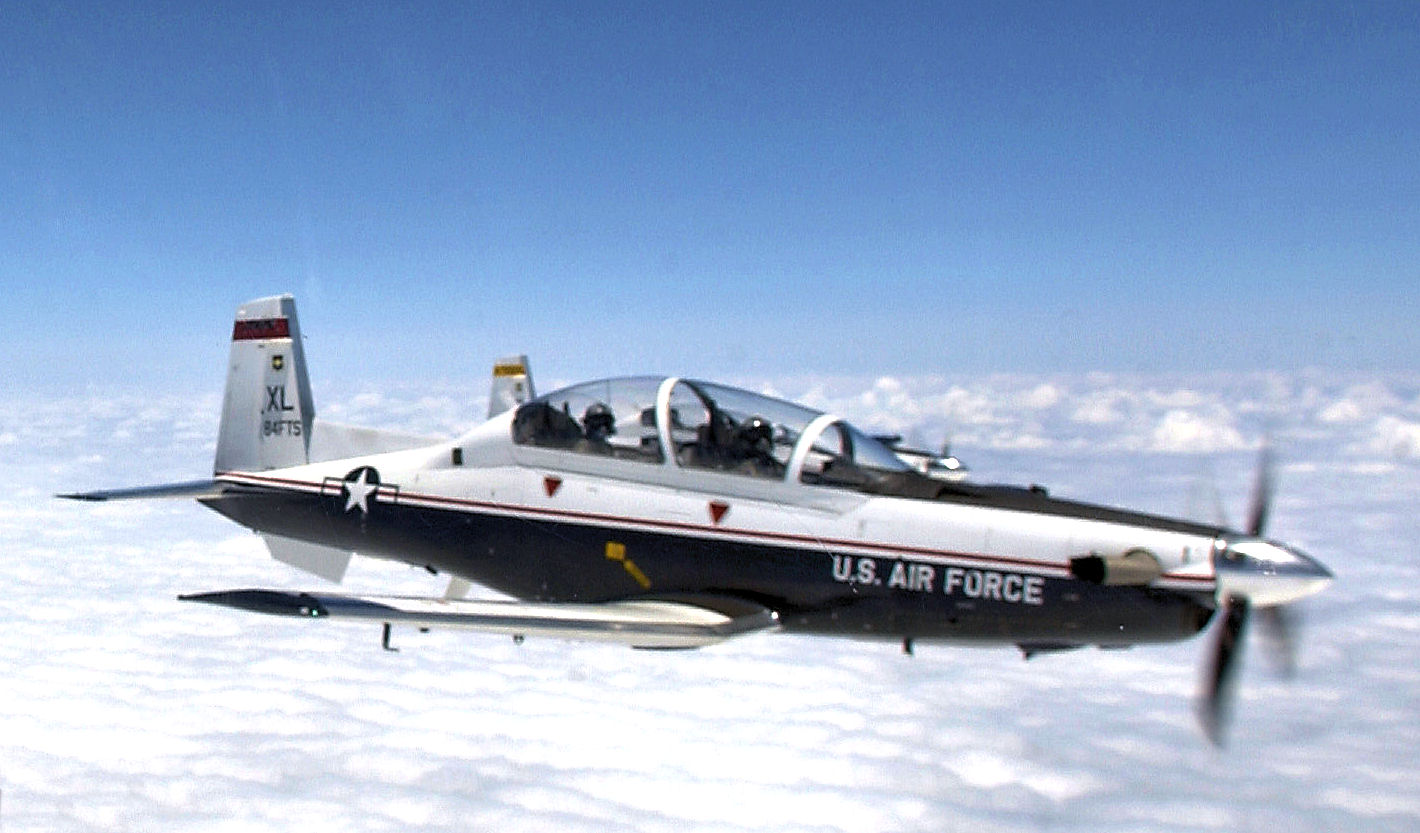
- 84th Flying Training Squadron T-6 Texan II
- Active: 1942–1945; 1946–1987; 1990–1992; 1998 – 2012
- Country: United States
- Branch: United States Air Force
- Role: Pilot Training
- Part of: Air Education and Training Command
- Garrison/HQ: Laughlin Air Force Base, Texas
- Engagements: Operation Overlord; Operation Market Garden; Battle of the Bulge; Operation Plunder
- Decorations: Distinguished Unit Citation; Air Force Outstanding Unit Award

Insignia
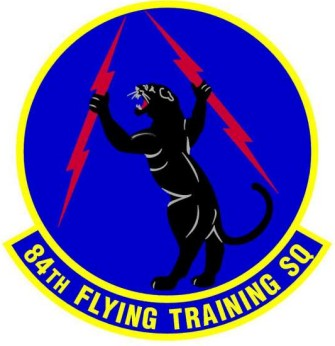
- 84th Flying Training Squadron emblem (modified 23 September 1998)

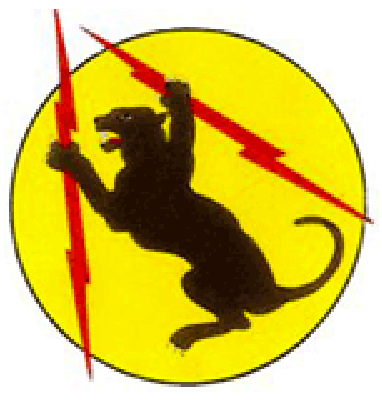
- 84th Fighter Squadron emblem (approved 26 August 1942)

The 84th Flying Training Squadron was part of the United States Air Force 47th Flying Training Wing based at Laughlin Air Force Base, Texas. It operated Beechcraft T-6 Texan II aircraft conducting flight training.

== History ==
=== World War II ===
The squadron was activated in 1942, as the 84th Pursuit Squadron (Interceptor). Soon after its activation the US Army transferred the squadron to England where it lost a majority of its pilots and planes to the American war effort in North Africa. During the war the 84th flew missions ranging from bomber escort, ground attack, counter-air, and close air support.

In April 1943, the unit was involved in its first combat mission in North Africa. In June 1944, the 84th supported the Allied landings at Normandy and directly contributed to the breakthrough at Saint-Lô in July 1944. In September 1944, the squadron contributed to the Allied victory in the Arnhem-Nijmegen airborne landings; notably, they suppressed numerous ground positions during the airborne assault and were credited with saving scores of American and British troop transports. For this action the 84th received the Distinguished Unit Citation.

In December 1944 the 84th began flying the North American P-51 Mustang. They used their new plane very successfully and on 10 April destroyed 58 aircraft on the ground earning the 84th its second Distinguished Unit Citation. In April 1945 the 84th flew its last combat mission escorting British bombers on their way to Hitler's "Eagles Nest". The squadron completed three years overseas and was credited with 260 Luftwaffe aircraft destroyed.

=== Air Defense Command ===
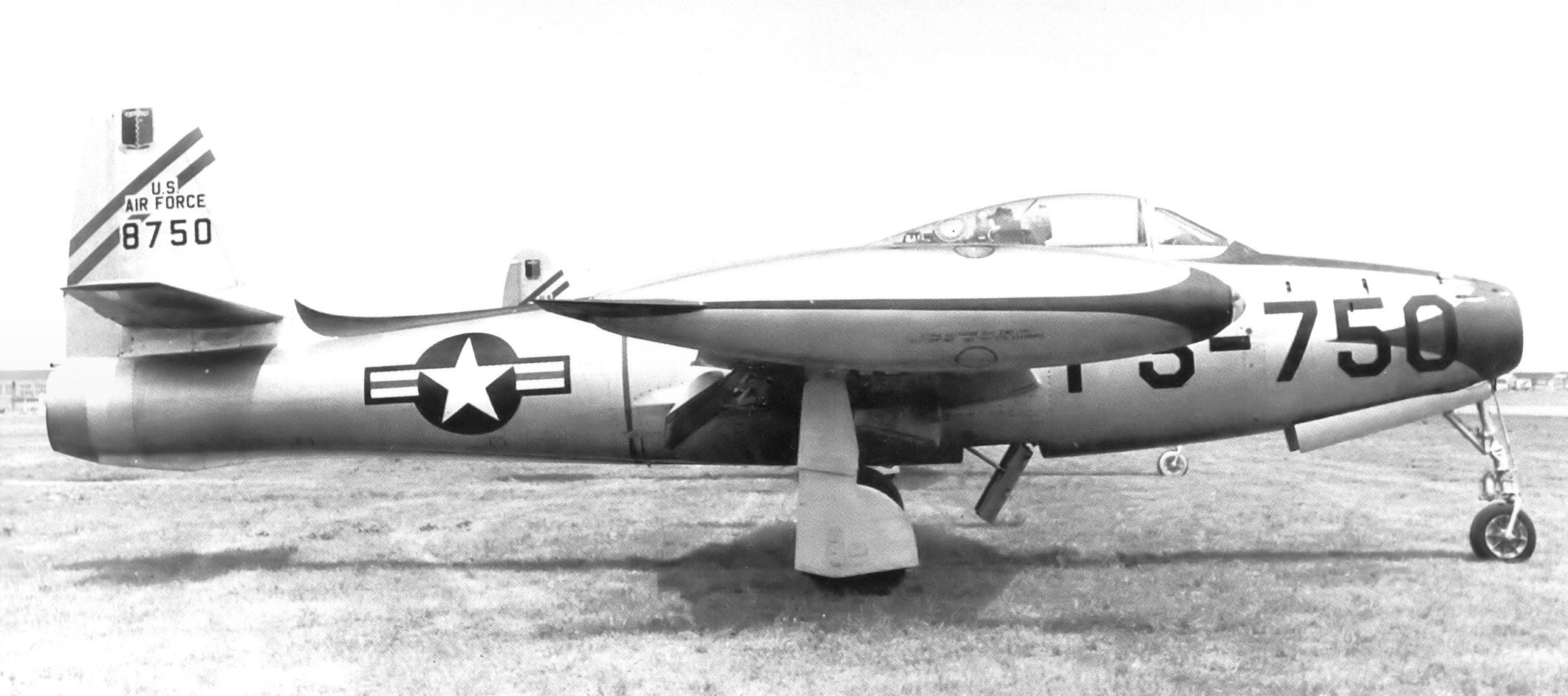
84th Fighter Interceptor Squadron F-84D 48–750, about 1950

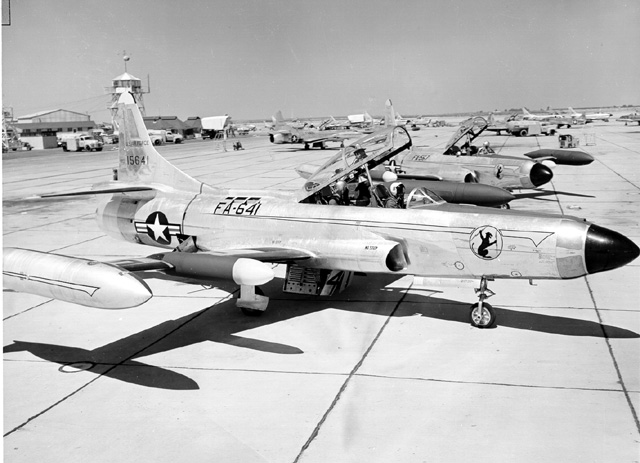
F-94 Starfire of the 84th Fighter Interceptor Squadron

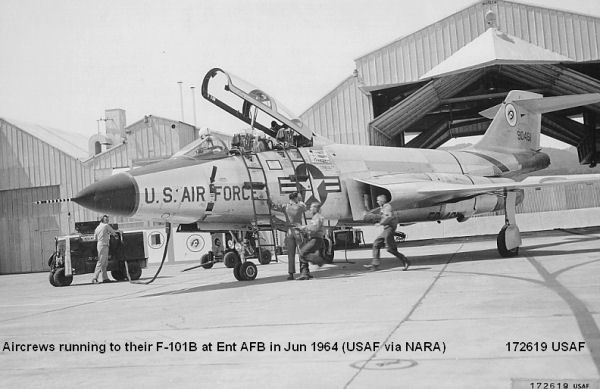
84th FIS McDonnell F-101B Voodoo 59–0461 at Ent AFB, Colorado in 1964

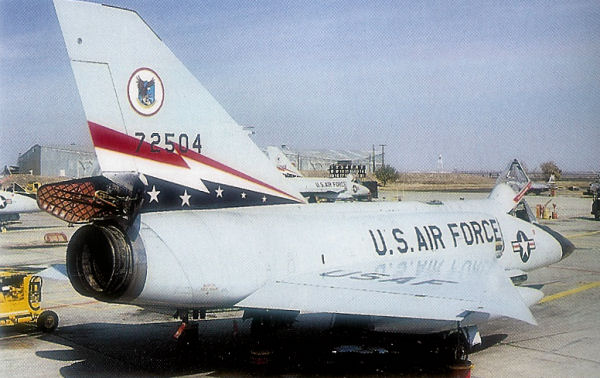
Convair F-106A Delta Dart 57-2504 of the 84th FIS

The 84th served as part of the occupation forces until it transferred to the United States in June 1947, where it eventually assumed an air defense mission. Assigned to Air Defense Command and again equipped with Mustangs at Hamilton Air Force Base, California with a mission for the air defense of San Francisco and the Bay Area. It was upgraded to Republic F-84D Thunderjet jet aircraft in 1949, and equipped with first-generation Northrop F-89B Scorpions in 1951. During the 1950s the 84th FIS operated both the Lockheed F-94B and F-94C Starfire aircraft as well as 4 versions of the Northrop F-89 Scorpion (B, D, H, J variants). In 1960 it received the new McDonnell F-101B Voodoo supersonic interceptor, and the F-101F operational and conversion trainer. The two-seat trainer version was equipped with dual controls, but carried the same armament as the F-101B and were fully combat-capable.

On 22 October 1962, before President John F. Kennedy told Americans that missiles were in place in Cuba, the squadron dispersed one third of its force, equipped with nuclear tipped missiles to Kingsley Field at the start of the Cuban Missile Crisis. These planes returned to Hamilton after the crisis. Although the number of ADC interceptor squadrons remained almost constant in the early 1960s, attrition (and the fact that production lines closed in 1961) caused a gradual drop in the number of planes assigned to a squadron, from 24 to typically 18 by 1964. To make up for attrition of F-101s, ADC inactivated the 83d Fighter-Interceptor Squadron at Hamilton. Six of these aircraft were retained at Hamilton and the 84th's strength went from 18 to 24 aircraft

In 1966, F-101s were featured in the film The Russians Are Coming, the Russians Are Coming. The F-101Bs were transferred to the Air National Guard and 1968 and replaced by Convair F-106 Delta Darts.

It moved to Castle Air Force Base, California in 1973 as part of the shutdown of Hamilton. It was inactivated in 1981 as the interceptor mission was being transferred to the Air National Guard.

=== Tactical Air Command ===
In July 1981 the squadron was redesignated the 84th Fighter Interceptor Training Squadron and received a fleet of Lockheed T-33 T-Birds to train in, specializing in electronic counter-countermeasures training. It participated in live flying exercises as targets for various air divisions and for the McDonnell Douglas F-15 Eagles of the 49th Tactical Fighter Wing. The squadron also flew target missions for the weapons controller training program until early 1987 when it was inactivated.

=== Modern era ===
In April 1990 the squadron was resurrected to meet the increased demand for pilots. The 84th was designated a Flying Training Squadron and joined the 85th Flying Training Squadron in training pilots in the Cessna T-37 Tweet at Laughlin Air Force Base. Again yielding to changes in pilot production the squadron was inactivated in October 1992. In 1998 pilot production increased again and the 84th was reactivated on 1 October 1998.

After 14 more years of service, the 84th FTS was inactivated and replaced by the 434th Flying Training Squadron in 2012.

== Lineage ==
- Constituted as the 84th Pursuit Squadron (Interceptor) on 13 January 1942
- Activated on 9 February 1942

Redesignated 84th Pursuit Squadron (Interceptor) (Twin Engine) on 22 April 1942
Redesignated 84th Fighter Squadron (Twin Engine) on 15 May 1942
Redesignated 84th Fighter Squadron on 1 March 1943
Redesignated 84th Fighter Squadron, Single Engine on 21 August 1944

- Inactivated on 18 October 1945
- Activated on 20 August 1946

Redesignated 84th Fighter Squadron, Jet on 24 September 1948
Redesignated 84th Fighter-Interceptor Squadron on 20 January 1950
Redesignated 84th Fighter Interceptor Training Squadron on 1 July 1981

- Inactivated on 27 February 1987

Redesignated 84th Flying Training Squadron on 9 February 1990

- Activated on 2 April 1990
- Inactivated on 1 October 1992
- Activated on 1 October 1998
- Inactivated 24 August 2012

=== Assignments ===
- 78th Pursuit Group (later 78th Fighter Group), 9 February 1942 – 18 October 1945
- 78th Fighter Group (later 78th Fighter-Interceptor Group), 20 August 1946
- 4702d Defense Wing, 6 February 1952
- 28th Air Division, 7 November 1952
- 566th Air Defense Group, 16 February 1953
- 78th Fighter Group, 18 August 1955
- 78th Fighter Wing, 1 February 1961
- 1st Fighter Wing, 31 December 1969
- 26th Air Division, 1 October 1970 – 27 February 1987
- 47th Flying Training Wing, 2 April 1990
- 47th Operations Group, 15 December 1991 – 1 October 1992
- 47th Operations Group, 1 October 1998 – 24 August 2012

=== Stations ===
- Baer Field, Indiana, 9 February 1942
- Muroc Army Air Field, California, 30 April 1942
- Oakland Airport, California, 11 May 1942
- Hamilton Field, California, 4 November 1942 – 10 November 1942
- RAF Goxhill (AAF-345), England, 1 December 1942
- RAF Duxford (AAF-357), England, 1 April 1943 – 11 October 1945
- Camp Kilmer, New Jersey, 16 October 1945 – 18 October 1945
- AAF Station Straubing, Germany, 20 August 1946 – 25 June 1947
- Mitchel Field, New York, 25 June 1947
- Hamilton Air Force Base, California, 24 November 1948
- Castle Air Force Base, California, 1 September 1973 – 27 February 1987
- Laughlin Air Force Base, Texas, 2 April 1990 – 1 October 1992
- Laughlin Air Force Base, Texas, 1 October 1998 – 24 August 2012

=== Aircraft ===
- Lockheed P-38 Lightning (1942–1943)
- Republic P-47 Thunderbolt (1943–1944)
- North American P-51 Mustang (1944–1945, 1949–1951)
- Republic F-84D Thunderjet (1949–1951)
- North American F-89B Scorpion (1951–1953)
- Lockheed F-94B Starfire, (1953)
- Lockheed F-94C Starfire, (1953–1956)
- Northrop F-89D Scorpion, (1956–1957)
- Northrop F-89J Scorpion, (1957–1959)
- McDonnell F-101B Voodoo (1959–1968)
- Convair F-106 Delta Dart (1968–1981)
- Lockheed T-33 T-Bird (1981–1987)
- Cessna T-37 Tweet (1990–1992, 1998–2003)
- Beechcraft T-6 Texan II (2002–2012)
