= 82nd Aerial Targets Squadron =

82nd Aerial Targets Squadron

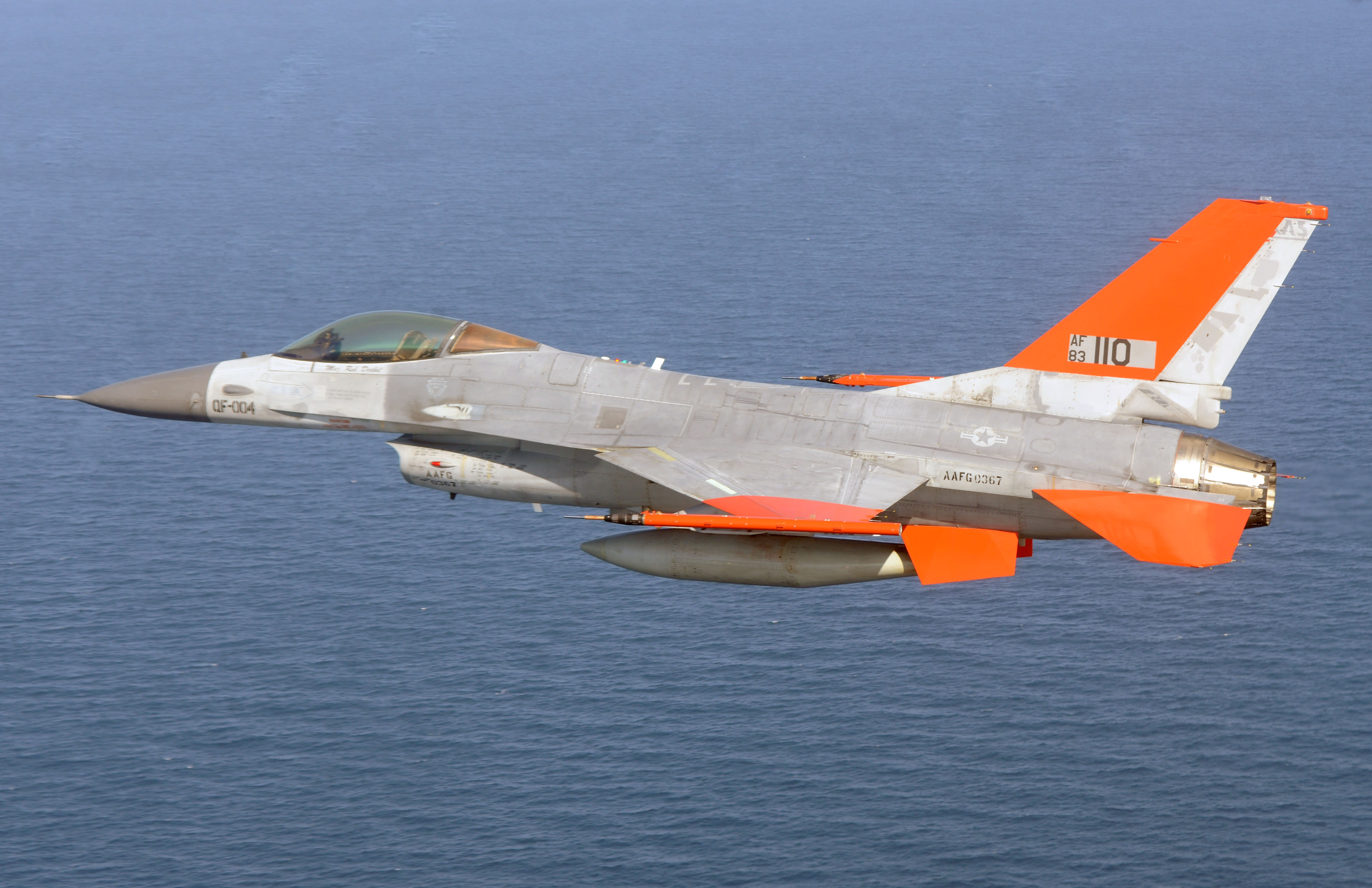
- One of the squadron's QF-16s over the Gulf of Mexico, 2013
- Active: 1942–1945; 1946–1971; 1981–present
- Country: United States
- Branch: United States Air Force
- Role: Aerial target operation
- Part of: Air Combat Command: United States Air Force Warfare Center; 53rd Wing; 53rd Weapons Evaluation Group
- Garrison/HQ: Tyndall Air Force Base, Florida
- Aircraft: QF-16 Fighting Falcon; E-9A Widget
- Engagements: European Theater of Operations

- Decorations: Distinguished Unit Citation (2x) Air Force Outstanding Unit Award (7x) Air Force Organizational Excellence Award

Insignia
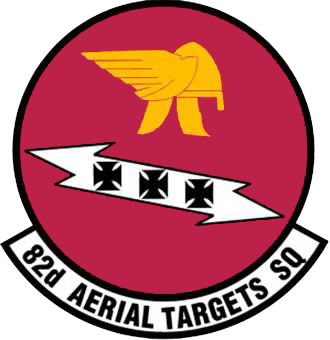
- 82nd Aerial Targets Squadron emblem (modified c. 1995)

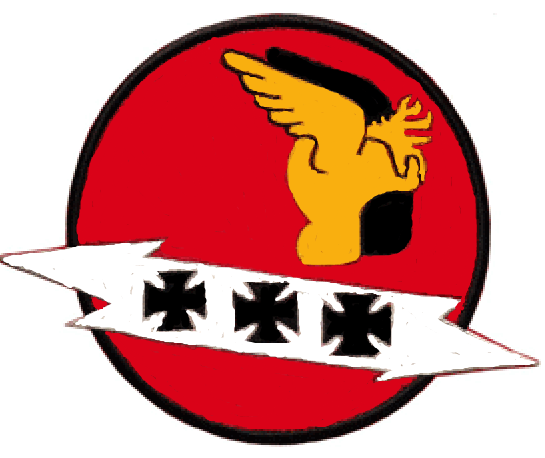
- 82nd Fighter-Interceptor Squadron emblem (approved 15 March 1951)

The 82nd Aerial Targets Squadron is a United States Air Force unit. It is assigned to the 53rd Weapons Evaluation Group and stationed at Tyndall Air Force Base, Florida.

The squadron was first activated as the 82nd Pursuit Squadron in 1942. Flying Lockheed P-38 Lightnings, the squadron saw combat as the 82nd Fighter Squadron during World War II in the European Theater of Operations, earning a pair of Distinguished Unit Citations for its actions in combat.

Inactivated after the war, the squadron was activated for the air defense, first in the United States, then on Okinawa. It was inactivated in 1972, but activated again the following year as the 82nd Flying Training Squadron and trained pilots for the Air Force for the next four years. It was activated in its most recent role in 1981.

== Overview ==
The 82nd Aerial Targets Squadron was the last USAF unit which flew the McDonnell F-4 Phantom II, flying the QF-4E,-G, and QRF-4C versions in the role of an aerial target. The 82 ATRS also had a Detachment at Holloman Air Force Base to fly QF-4s in support of DoD testing in the White Sands Missile Range (WSMR) Complex.

A secondary mission was the use of man-rated QF-4s in support of the USAF Heritage Flight program at military air shows and other specific commemorative events as authorized by Air Combat Command.

The squadron also maintains three 120-foot drone recovery vessels and two smaller vessels to recover aerial targets and support range safety, patrol, and salvage operations. Squadron members also operate the Air Force's only two E-9A Widgets, a military version of the de Havilland Canada DHC-8.

In 2013, the squadron commenced acquisition of the first batch of QF-16 aircraft. The QF-16 has replaced the QF-4 in the Full Scale Aerial Target (FSAT) role.

== History ==
=== World War II ===
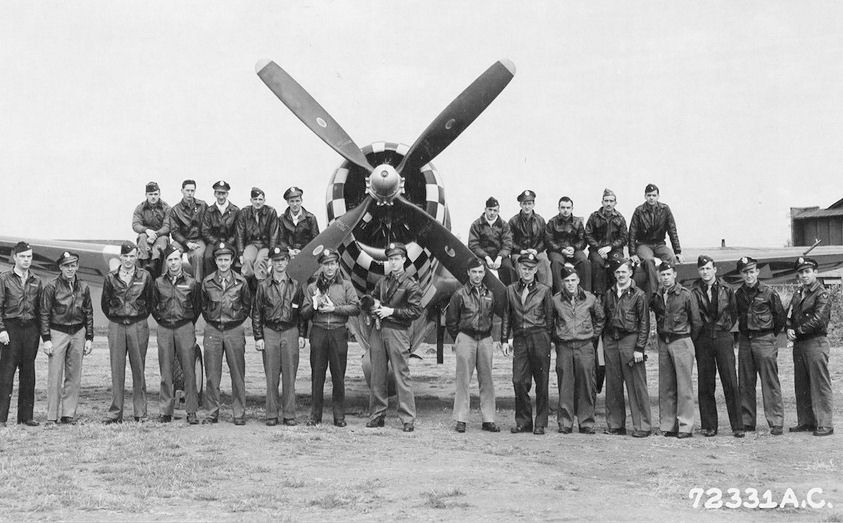
Pilots of the 82nd Fighter Squadron, 78th Fighter Group, Eighth Air Force, 1945

The 82nd Fighter Squadron saw combat in the European Theater of Operations (ETO) from 13 April 1943 to 25 April 1945, and training, maneuvers, and air defense, from April to September 1945. It was part of the occupation forces in Germany from August 1946 to June 1947. It served in air defense in United States from January 1949 to March 1953 and from October 1954 to February 1966.

=== Air Defense Command/Aerospace Defense Command fighter interceptor unit ===
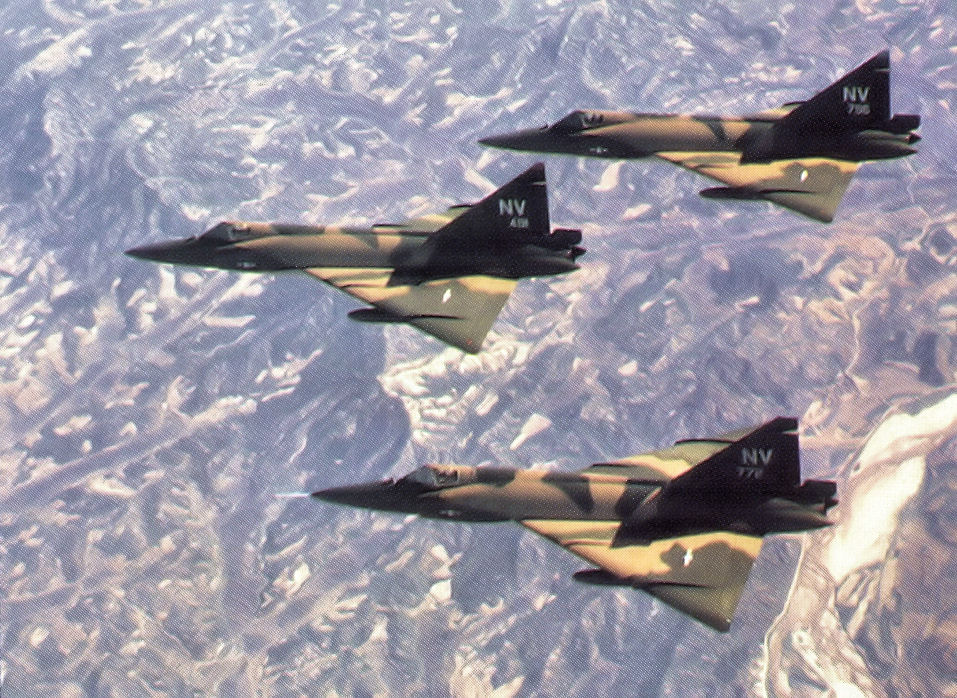
82nd Fighter-Interceptor Squadron F-102s over South Korea 1970 on rotation from Naha AB, Okinawa

During the Cold War, the 82nd Fighter-Interceptor Squadron was an Air Defense Command tenant unit based at Travis Air Force Base, California.

On 22 October 1962, before President John F. Kennedy told Americans that Soviet ballistic missiles were in place in Cuba, the squadron dispersed one third of its force, equipped with nuclear tipped missiles to Siskiyou County Airport at the start of the Cuban Missile Crisis. However, before the crisis was over, on 26 October, the planes returned to Travis AFB because of overcrowding at Siskiyou.

In 1966, the 82 FIS was deployed to Naha Air Base, Okinawa.

The prime aircraft of the squadron was the Convair F-102 Delta Dagger, or "Deuce", which was the more common nickname. In order to deploy to Naha, each plane was configured with refueling probes and required extensive pilot training. This was one of the few times such a modification was done to a relatively short-ranged jet fighter-interceptor. In January 1968, the 82nd was scrambled to South Korea in response to the Pueblo Incident, where North Korea had seized the intelligence ship USS Pueblo. The 82nd Fighter Interceptor Squadron maintained a presence in South Korea with a detachment of temporarily assigned aircraft (12) and personnel (TDY) to Suwon Air Base, ROK. The squadron continued this service until 31 May 1971 when the 51st Fighter Inteceptor Wing (51 FIW), along with all the other operational and support squadrons (including the 82nd Fighter Interceptor Squadron) were inactivated.

=== Air Training Command ===
From 1972 to 1976, the 82nd was redesignated as the 82nd Flying Training Squadron, part of the 78th Flying Training Wing of Air Training Command (ATC), conducting Undergraduate Pilot Training for USAF and NATO/Allied students at Webb Air Force Base, Texas in the T-41, Cessna T-37 Tweet and Northrop T-38 Talon. With the end of the Vietnam War and a reduced need for USAF pilots, the 82nd was inactivated in 1976 and the 78th Wing inactivated and Webb closed in 1977 as part of post-Vietnam defense spending reductions.

=== Aerial Target Unit ===
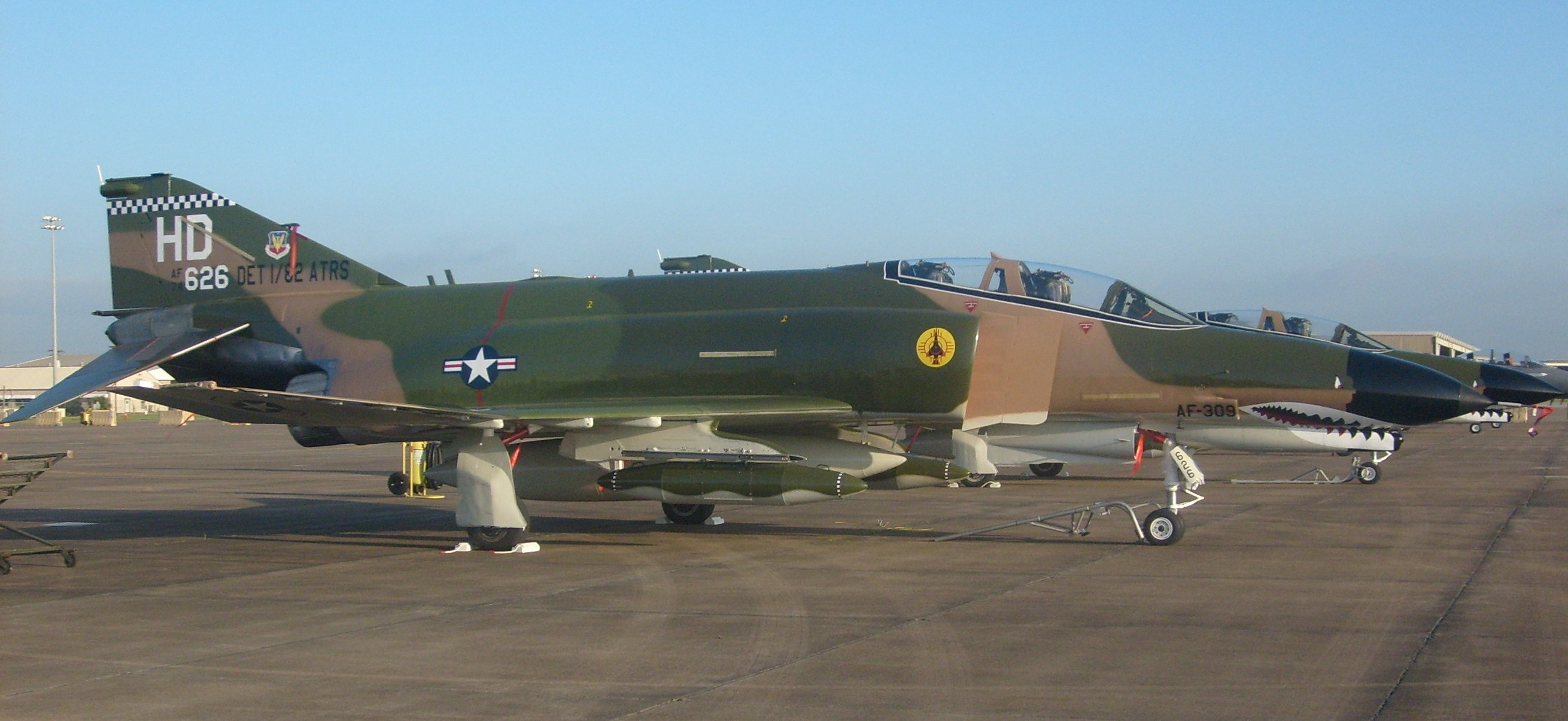
Det. 1 82nd ATRS McDonnell QF-4E Phantom II at the Wings Over Houston Airshow October 2007

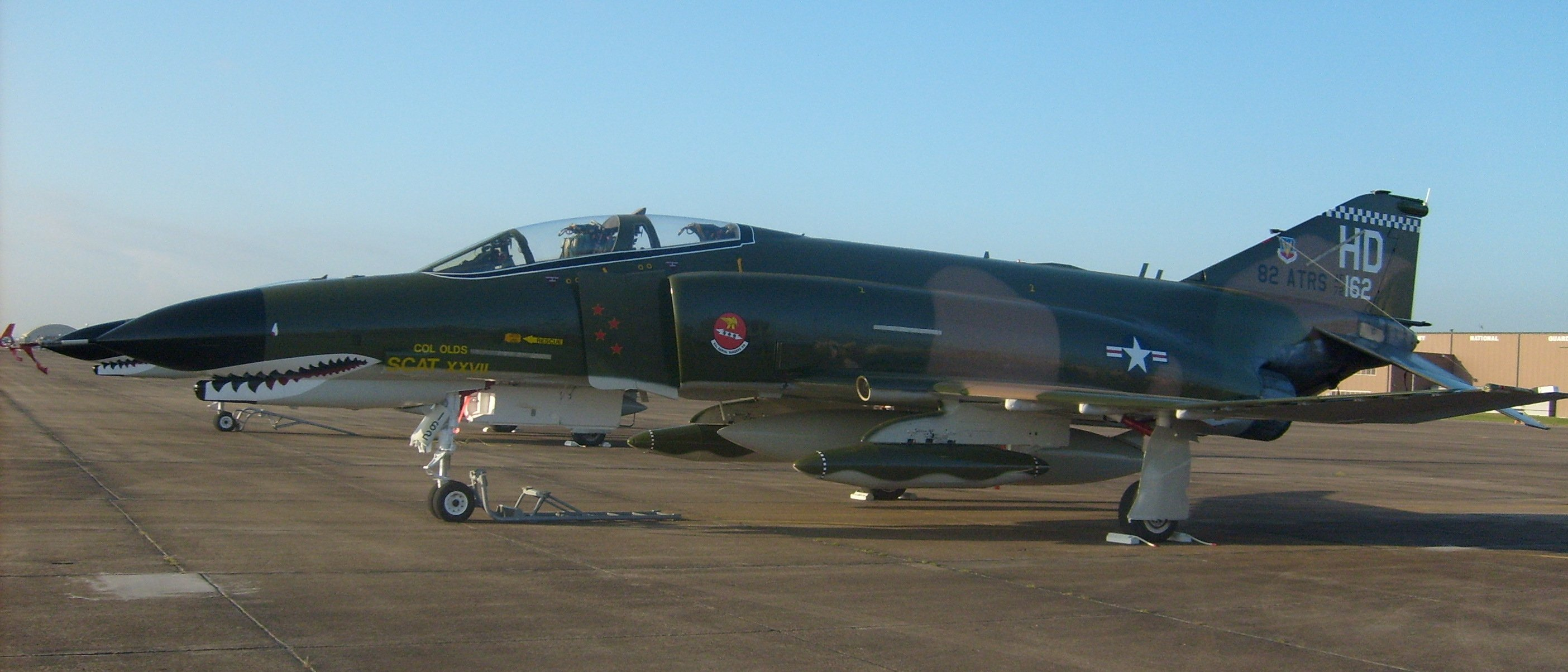
Det. 1 82 ATRS McDonnell QF-4E Phantom II "SCAT XXVII" at the Wings Over Houston Airshow October 2007

On 1 July 1981 the 82nd Tactical Aerial Targets Squadron was assigned to the 325th Fighter Weapons Wing at Tyndall Air Force Base, Florida. On 15 October 1983, the 82nd Tactical Aerial Targets Squadron was transferred to the 475th Weapons Evaluation Group. It is now part of the 53rd Weapons Evaluation Group.

The 82nd Aerial Targets Squadron is very unusual by the type of aircraft it operates. This squadron is the only unit left in the USAF to fly the venerable F-4 Phantom II reduced to the role of aerial targets. Located at Tyndall Air Force Base, Florida, the 82nd is a subordinate of the 53rd Weapons Evaluation Group, assigned to Air Combat Command's 53rd Wing at Eglin Air Force Base, Florida. The 53rd Group is responsible for conducting the USAF Air-to-Air Weapons System Evaluation Program known as "Combat Archer" from Tyndall and the Air-to-Ground version known as "Combat Hammer" from Eglin. Both bases are located at short distances from each other in the Florida panhandle. During these exercises, the 82 ATRS provides drone targets such as the QF-4 in the Full Scale Aerial Target role next to the MQM-107 Streaker and BQM-34 Firebee as Sub-Scale Aerial Targets. To perform surveillance and gather telemetry data during shooting over the Gulf of Mexico, the units uses the only two E-9A in the USAF inventory. The E-9A is a special version of the civilian DHC-8 ("DASH-8") specially equipped with a large phased-array antenna on the right side of the fuselage. The E-9A can record all data onboard and can retransmit it in real time to the ground control station. The 82 ATRS also has a Detachment at Holloman AFB which is responsible for FSAT operations at the White Sands Missile Range near Holloman Air Force Base, New Mexico.

Modifications to the airframe and installation of major systems to transform the McDonnell F-4 Phantom II took about four months. This included installation of the primary and back-up Automatic Flight Control System, Command/Telemetry System, VDOPS Scoring System, Flight Termination System, Visual Enhancement System and Ancillary Subsystems.

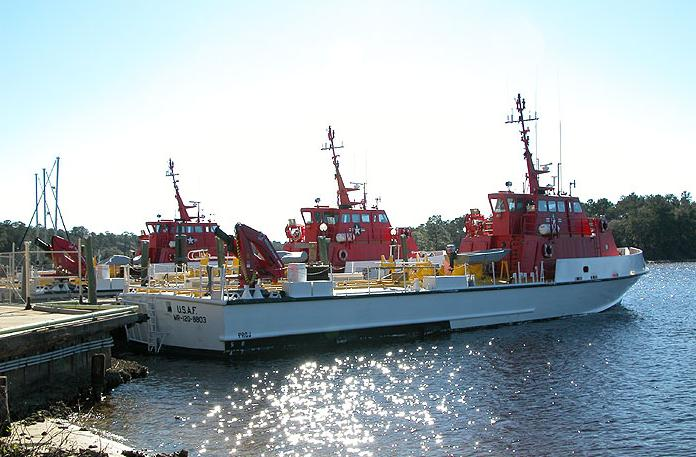
U.S. Air Force ships of the "Tyndall Navy"

There are two kinds of QF-4s. The first is NULLO Full-Scale Aerial Target which keep the above basic drone conversions. For the 82nd, NULLO means Not Under Live Local Operation. A NULLO flight always required at least three drones, the one to be shot down, a spare and a manned QF-4 flying as chase plane. The second kind were manned full-scale drones fitted with advanced countermeasure systems installed by the USAF. While some of the twin-stick QF-4s retained their dual control system as trainers and both ejection seats in working order, the other manned QF-4s have the rear cockpit ejection seat removed. All NULLO aircraft have both ejection seats removed. Noticeable differences between the two are the six antennas from the VDOPS scoring system, the hump on top of the fuselage, a crude box on the left intake and a fairing in the left forward Sparrow III missile well.

=== Watercraft ===
Known as the "Tyndall Navy" is the Watercraft Branch of the 82 ATRS. It comprises three 120 ft drone recovery vessels designated MR-120 and two smaller vessels. These vessels are used for providing direct sea support to recover aerial targets like the MQM-107 and BQM-34, range safety patrols and salvage operations.

== Lineage ==
- Constituted as the 82nd Pursuit Squadron (Interceptor) on 13 January 1942

Activated on 9 February 1942
Redesignated: 82nd Pursuit Squadron (Interceptor) (Twin Engine)' on 22 April 1942
Redesignated: 82nd Fighter Squadron (Twin Engine) on 15 May 1942
Redesignated: 82nd Fighter Squadron on 1 March 1943
Inactivated on 18 October 1945

- Redesignated 82nd Fighter Squadron, Single Engine c. July 1946

Activated on 20 August 1946
Redesignated: 82nd Fighter Squadron, Jet c. November 1948
Redesignated: 82nd Fighter-Interceptor Squadron on 20 January 1950
Inactivated on 31 May 1971

- Redesignated 82nd Flying Training Squadron on 14 April 1972

Activated on 1 December 1972
Inactivated on 15 June 1976

- Redesignated 82nd Tactical Aerial Target Squadron on 17 June 1981

Activated on 1 July 1981
Redesignated: 82nd Tactical Aerial Targets Squadron on 30 September 1982
Redesignated: 82nd Aerial Targets Squadron on 1 November 1991

=== Assignments ===
- 78th Pursuit Group (later 78th Fighter Group), 9 February 1942 – 18 October 1945
- 78th Fighter Group (later 78th Fighter-Interceptor Group), 20 August 1946
- 4703rd Defense Wing, 6 February 1952
- 4704th Defense Wing, 13 March 1952
- 4702nd Defense Wing, 16 February 1953
- 65th Air Division, 1 April 1953
- Iceland Air Defense Force, 8 March 1954
- 528th Air Defense Group, 25 October 1954
- 28th Air Division, 18 August 1955

Attached to 78th Fighter Group, 18 October 1956 – 1 July 1960

- San Francisco Air Defense Sector, 1 July 1960
- Portland Air Defense Sector, 1 August 1963 (attached to 51st Fighter-Interceptor Wing after 17 February 1966)
- 26th Air Division, 1 April 1966 (remained attached to 51st Fighter-Interceptor Wing to 25 June 1966)
- 51st Fighter-Interceptor Wing, 25 June 1966 – 31 May 1971 (attached to 314th Air Division, 30 January-20 February 1968)
- 78th Flying Training Wing, 1 December 1972 – 15 June 1976
- 325th Fighter Weapons Wing 1 July 1981
- 475th Weapons Evaluation Group (later 53rd Weapons Evaluation Group), 15 October 1983 – present

=== Stations ===
- Baer Field, Indiana, 9 February 1942
- Muroc Army Air Field, California, 30 April 1942
- San Diego Airport, California, 8 May 1942
- March Field, California, 3–10 November 1942
- RAF Goxhill, England, 1 December 1942
- RAF Duxford, England, 1 April 1943 – 11 October 1945
- Camp Kilmer, New Jersey, 16–18 October 1945
- AAF Station Straubing, Germany, 20 August 1946 – 25 June 1947
- Mitchel Field, New York, 25 June 1947
- Hamilton Air Force Base, California, 24 November 1948
- Larson Air Force Base, Washington, 6 February 1952 – 7 March 1953
- Keflavik Airport, Iceland, 1 April 1953-October 1954
- Presque Isle Air Force Base, Maine, 22 October 1954
- Travis Air Force Base, California, 18 August 1955 – 25 June 1966

Deployed at Naha Air Base, Okinawa, Japan 17 February-24 June 1966

- Naha Air Base, Okinawa, Japan, 25 June 1966 – 31 May 1971 (deployed to Suwon Air Base, South Korea, 30 January-20 February 1968) Operation Combat Fox
- Webb Air Force Base, Texas, 1 December 1972 – 15 June 1976
- Tyndall Air Force Base, Florida, 1 July 1981 – present

=== Aircraft ===
- Lockheed P-38 Lightning, 1942–1943
- Republic P-47 Thunderbolt, 1943–1944
- North American P-51 Mustang (later F-51), 1944–1945, 1949–1951
- Republic F-84D Thunderjet, 1949–1952
- Lockheed F-94 Starfire, 1952–1954
- Northrop F-89D Scorpion, 1954–1955
- North American F-86D Sabre, 1955–1958
- Convair F-102 Delta Dagger, 1957–1971 (Note: The 82nd was the last active-duty PACAF squadron to operate the F-102.)
- Cessna T-37 Tweet, 1972–1976
- McDonnell F-101 Voodoo, 1973–1982
- Convair PQM-102 Delta Dagger, 1981–1984
- Convair QF-102 Delta Dagger, 1981–1984
- North American QF-100 Super Sabre, 1983–1993
- De Havilland Canada E-9A Widget, 1988–present
- Convair QF-106 Delta Dart, 1991–1998
- McDonnell QF-4 Phantom II, 1996–2016
- General Dynamics QF-16 Fighting Falcon, 2013–present
