= De Havilland Canada E-9 Widget =

American military surveillance plane

E-9A Widget
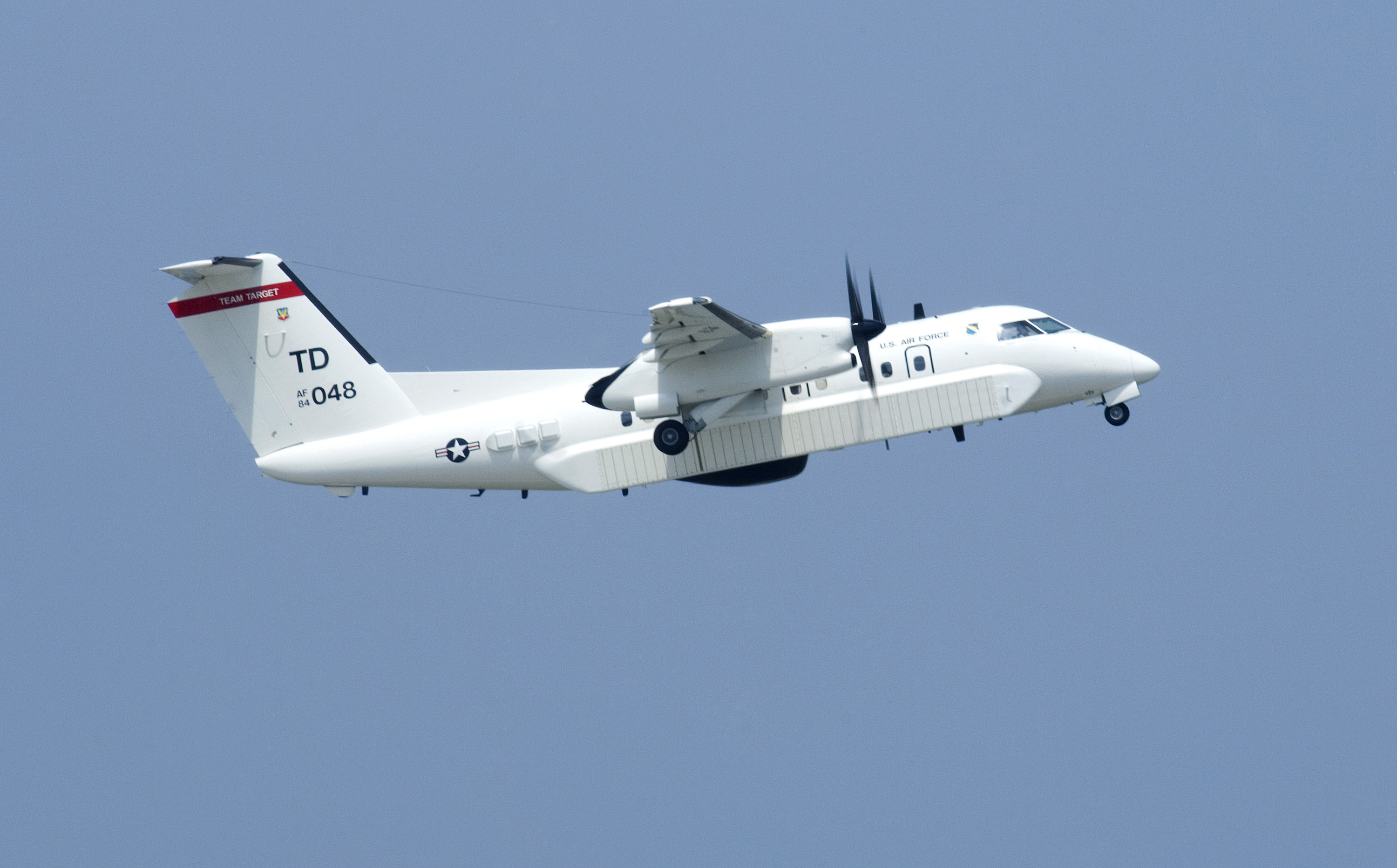

General information
- Role: Military test and evaluation surveillance aircraft
- Manufacturer: Bombardier
- Primary user: United States Air Force
- Number built: 2

History
- Introduction date: June 1988
- First flight: 1987
- Developed from: de Havilland Canada DHC-8-101

The de Havilland Canada E-9 Widget is an American telemetry support and surveillance plane in service with the United States Air Force. It is used as an airborne platform and telemetry relay aircraft providing ocean surface surveillance for range safety and target telemetry of missiles fired for over the horizon profiles on the Gulf of Mexico Ranges.

== History ==
In the early 1980s, the United States Air Force began seeking a specialized surveillance plane for the 53rd Weapons Evaluation Group (53rd WEG) which, for the sake of range safety, needs to ensure territorial waters are clear when aerial targets, drones, missiles and prototypes are in test flights. The unit was using the large and expensive EC-135N ARIA.

A request for proposal was officially issued, proposals included Alenia-Aérospatiale ATR-42-200, BAe 748 and Fokker F27-600. However these could not effectively accommodate the large conformal antenna of the AN/APS-128D and thus the newer Canadian Dash 8 won the bid.

The aircraft's first flight was done in secrecy in 1987 before entering service the next year in June with the 82nd Aerial Targets Squadron (82nd ATS) out of Tyndall Air Force Base in Florida.

The planes were immediately put to work on existing development or upgrade programs related to the F-15C/D Eagle, F-16C/D block 52, AIM-9X Sidewinder, AIM-132 ASRAAM, BGM-109 Tomahawk and later F-22, F-35 and more.

The two E-9As are also used to track aerial target drones used by the 82nd ATS (BQM-34 Firebee II, MQM-107D Streaker, QF-4 Phantom and QF-16 Fighting Falcon).

Since the end of the 2000s, the aircraft have been modernized, the AN/APS-148D radar was replaced by the AN/APS-143(V)-1 which can detect even smaller targets in the Gulf of Mexico such as small boats and small unmanned surface vehicles. Tests were even conducted with the US Navy to test the E-9's ability to detect submarine periscopes though results were officially not satisfactory. A major concern for the test and evaluation of weapons and aircraft is the presence of foreign spying / intelligence gathering assets.

== Use ==
During live missile launches and other dangerous military operations, the E-9A serves as a surveillance platform to make sure that no civilian boats or planes are present in the Gulf of Mexico seas. At Tyndall Air Force Base in Florida, the E-9A supports the development, evaluation, and operational testing of air-to-air weapons systems by providing essential radar data about the locations and movement of civilian boats.

A person in a life raft may be detected up to 25 miles away in the sea by the aircraft, which is equipped with AN/APS-143(V)-1 Airborne Sea Surveillance Radar, which is modified to identify things in the Gulf of Mexico. The range safety officer, who chooses the shot location for live-fire operations, receives this telemetry data via downlink.

Test and drone vehicles flying over the Gulf of Mexico provide data to the aircraft's fixed antenna array, which records and receives it. It can transmit two UHF frequencies from the air to ground locations across the horizon. It is also able to locate drones that have been shot down during a weapon testing exercise.

The 53rd Weapons Evaluation Group began using the plane in 1988, and since that day it has been providing telemetry and sea surveillance radar services to the adjacent Eglin Air Force Base, as part of the Weapon System Evaluation Programme.

== Design ==
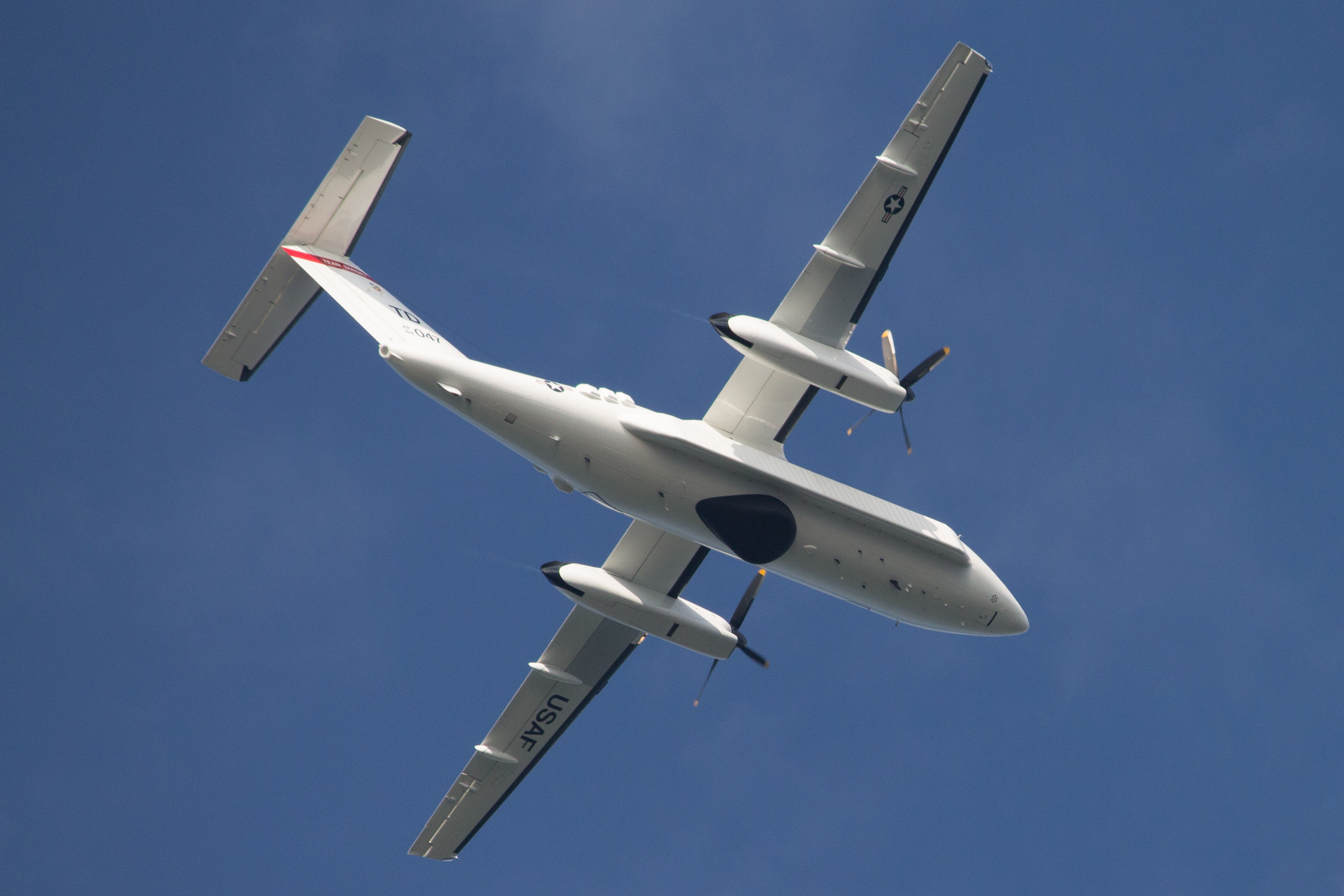
An E-9 with distinctive antenna arrays

Externally the E-9 Widget heavily resembles other Dash 8 planes. Apart from United States Air Force markings, the main distinguishing feature is the 9.1-metre-long (30 ft) antenna of the AN/APS-128D multimode X-band surveillance radar conformally mounted on the lower right side of the fuselage. This was later replaced by the AN/APS-143(V)-1 Airborne Sea Surveillance Radar. The aircraft has a fixed antenna array that receives and records telemetry from test and drone vehicles flying over the Gulf of Mexico. It can relay two UHF frequencies over the horizon to ground sites.

The crew consists of two pilots in the cockpit which is similar to commercial models and two mission operators in the aft fuselage.

== Operators ==
- United States
  - United States Air Force
    - 53rd Weapons Evaluation Group
      - 82nd Aerial Targets Squadron

== Specifications ==
Data from United States Air Force Fact Sheet

- Power plant: 2 × Pratt & Whitney Canada PW120A turboprop engines
- Thrust: 1800 shp (1300 kW) each
- Wingspan: 85 ft (26 m)
- Length: 73 ft (22 m)
- Height: 24.5 ft (7.5 m)
- Mass: 34500 lb (15600 kg)
- Fuel capacity: 5600 lb (2500 kg)
- Payload: 697 lb (316 kg)
- Speed: 280 mph (450 km/h; 240 kn), 0.367 Mach
- Range: 1000 mi (1600 km)
- Ceiling: 30000 ft (9100 m)
- Cost (modified): US$16.5 million
- Crew: 4 (two pilots, two mission operators)

== See also ==
- Synthetic-aperture radar
- de Havilland Canada
- Dash 8
