= 4703d Defense Wing =

4703d Defense Wing
- Active: 1952
- Country: United States
- Branch: United States Air Force
- Type: Fighter Interceptor
- Role: Air Defense
- Part of: Air Defense Command

The 4703d Defense Wing is a discontinued United States Air Force organization. Its last assignment was with Air Defense Command (ADC)'s Western Air Defense Force at Larson Air Force Base (AFB), Washington. It was established in 1952 in a general reorganization of Air Defense Command (ADC), which replaced wings responsible for a base with wings responsible for a geographical area. It then assumed control of several Fighter Interceptor squadrons that had been assigned to the 101st Fighter-Interceptor Wing, which was an Air National Guard unit mobilized for the Korean War. The wing's 569th Air Base Group briefly assumed the host responsibility for Larson, but the wing and group were inactivated only 45 days later when Larson became a Tactical Air Command base. The wing's units were transferred to the nearby 4702d Defense Wing.

== History ==
The wing was organized at Larson AFB, Washington on 1 February 1952 in a major reorganization of ADC responding to ADC's difficulty under the existing wing base organizational structure in deploying fighter squadrons to best advantage. It absorbed the personnel and equipment of the operational elements of the 101st Fighter-Interceptor Wing (FIW) (Maine ANG) which inactivated at Larson AFB five days later and was returned to the ANG. The 82nd Fighter Interceptor Squadron (FIS) of the inactivating 78th Fighter-Interceptor Wing moved from Hamilton AFB to Larson AFB on 6 February 1952 to replace the 319th FIS, which deployed from Larson AFB to Suwon Air Base, Korea the day after the 4703rd Defense Wing was organized, although it remained assigned to the wing on paper. Both Squadrons were equipped with F-94 Starfire interceptor aircraft. The wing's 569th Air Base Group (ABG) absorbed the support elements of the 101st FIW's 101st ABG. However, the wing was short-lived because Larson AFB was transferred from ADC to Tactical Air Command (TAC) in April 1952. The 82nd FIS was reassigned to the 4704th Defense Wing in March, while the 569th ABG was transferred Western Air Defense Force days later, The 569th ABG was replaced by the 62nd ABG at the beginning of April, while TAC's 62nd Troop Carrier Wing moved to Larson AFB from McChord AFB the same month. The 4703rd Air Defense Wing was discontinued and remaining the ADC squadron at Larson AFB was eventually reassigned to the 4702nd Defense Wing, which moved to nearby Geiger Field later in 1952.

=== Lineage ===
- Designated as the 4703d Defense Wing and organized on 1 February 1952

Discontinued on 7 April 1952

=== Assignments ===
- Western Air Defense Force, 1 February 1952 - 7 April 1952

=== Components ===
- 569th Air Base Group, 1 February 1952 – 17 March 1952
- 82nd Fighter Interceptor Squadron, 6 February - 13 March 1952
- 319th Fighter-Interceptor Squadron, 6 February - 7 April 1952 (attached to Fifth Air Force after 1 March 1952)

=== Stations ===
- Larson AFB, Washington, 1 February 1952 – 7 April 1952

=== Aircraft ===
- F-94B, 1952

=== Commander ===
- Col. Thomas W. Steed, 1 February 1952 - 7 April 1952

== See also ==
- List of MAJCOM wings of the United States Air Force
- Aerospace Defense Command Fighter Squadrons
