= 566th Air Defense Group =

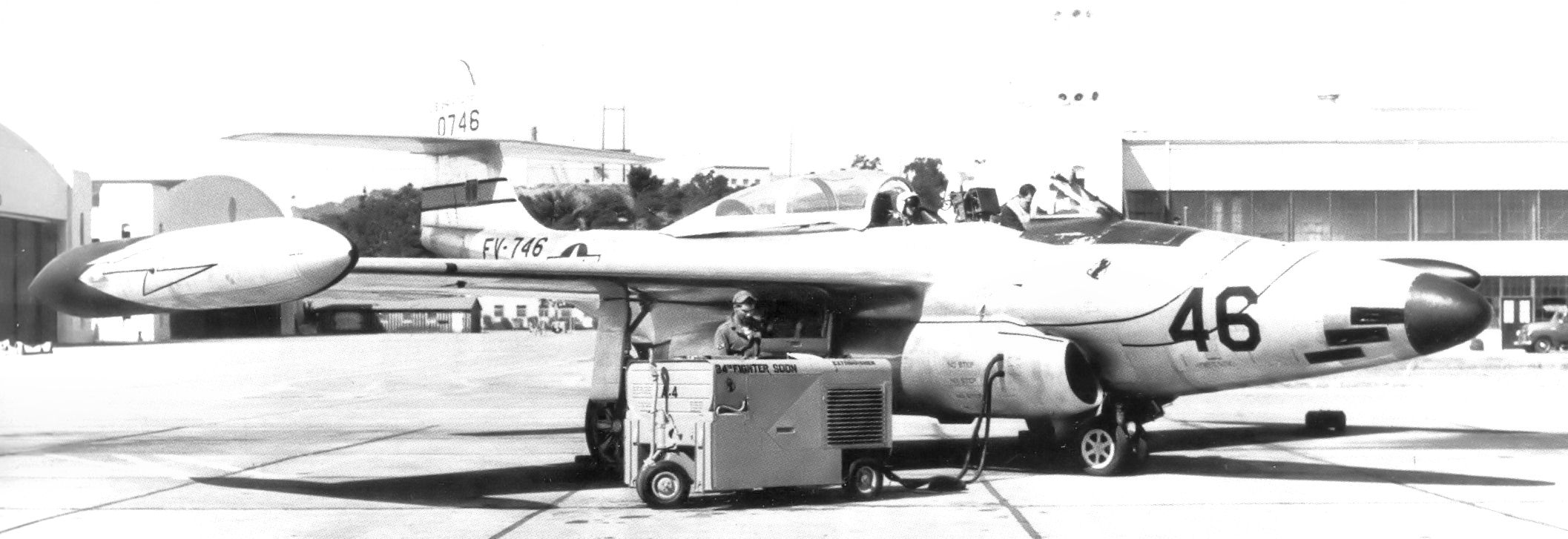
- F-89 Scorpion of the 84th Fighter-Interceptor Squadron at Hamilton AFB (Note: Aircraft is Northrop F-89C-5-NO Scorpion, serial 50-746.)
- Active: 1944–1945; 1952–1955
- Country: United States
- Branch: United States Air Force
- Type: Fighter interceptor
- Role: Air defense

The 566th Air Defense Group is a disbanded unit of the United States Air Force. Its last assignment was with the 28th Air Division at Hamilton Air Force Base, California, where it was inactivated on 18 August 1955. The group was originally activated as the 566th Air Service Group, a support unit for a combat group at the end of World War II but never deployed before it was inactivated in 1945.

The group was activated once again in 1952 at Hamilton Air Force Base, California as the 566th Air Base Group to replace the support elements of the inactivating 78th Fighter-Interceptor Wing. A year later Air Defense Command (ADC) established it as an operational headquarters for fighter-interceptor squadrons as well. It was replaced in 1955 when ADC transferred its mission, equipment, and personnel to the 78th Fighter Group in a project that replaced air defense groups commanding fighter squadrons with fighter groups with distinguished records during World War II.

== History ==
=== World War II ===
The group was activated at Robins Field, Georgia toward the end of World War II as the 566th Air Service Group in 1944 and trained to support a single combat group. Its 984th Air Engineering Squadron would provide maintenance that was beyond the capability of the combat group, its 1004th Air Materiel Squadron would handle all supply matters, and its Headquarters & Base Services Squadron would provide other support. The group was inactivated before it could be deployed overseas. It was disbanded in 1948.

=== Cold War ===
During the Cold War the group was reconstituted, redesignated as the 566th Air Base Group, and activated at Hamilton Air Force Base, California in 1952 in a major reorganization of Air Defense Command (ADC) responding to ADC's difficulty under the existing wing base organizational structure to deploy fighter squadrons to best advantage. It replaced the 78th Air Base Group as host unit for Hamilton. The 566th was assigned eight squadrons and one flight to perform its support responsibilities. The group also assumed responsibility to maintain aircraft stationed at Hamilton from the inactivating 78th Maintenance & Supply Group, while the operational elements of the 78th Fighter-Interceptor Wing were assigned to the 28th Air Division.

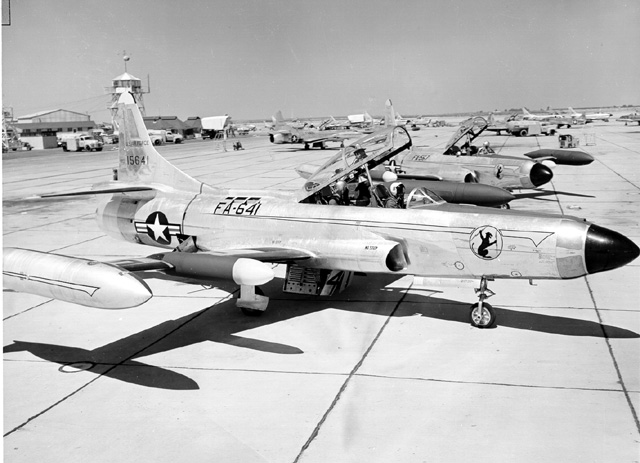
Lockheed F-94Cs of the 84th FIS (Note: In foreground is Lockheed F-94C-1-LO Starfighter, serial 51-5641. This aircraft was transferred to the Military Aircraft Storage and Disposal Center on 26 October 1957 and salvaged on 1 August 1958. Baugher, Joe (7 April 2023). "1951 USAF Serial Numbers". Joe Baugher.)

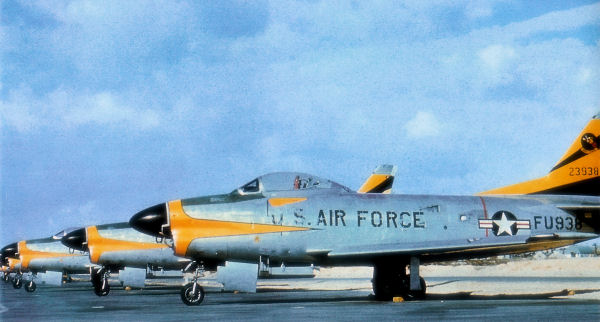
F-86Ds of the 496th FIS (Note: Aircraft in foreground is North American F-86D-45-NA Sabre, serial 52-3938. Photo taken after squadron moved to Europe. Transferred to the Royal Danish Air Force in 1962 for use as a ground trainer. Baugher, Joe (7 April 2023). "1952 USAF Serial Numbers". Joe Baugher.)

The 566th was redesignated the 566th Air Defense Group and assumed responsibility for air defense of the Northern California. It was assigned the 84th Fighter-Interceptor Squadron (FIS), flying 20mm cannon armed and airborne intercept radar equipped Northrop F-89 Scorpion aircraft from the 28th Air Division as its operational element. The 84th FIS was already stationed at Hamilton. In March, a second operational squadron, the 496th Fighter-Interceptor Squadron, was activated at Hamilton and assigned to the group.

The 496th FIS was initially equipped with outmoded World War II era North American F-51 Mustang Aircraft. In April, the 83rd FIS traded its Scorpions for Lockheed F-94 Starfire aircraft. and to later model Starfire, armed with Mighty Mouse rockets, before the end of the year. The 496th FIS, in turn, converted to North American F-86 Sabres (also with radar and Mighty Mouse rockets) during 1953. In February 1954, the 325th Fighter-Interceptor Squadron at Travis Air Force Base, California, also flying Sabres, was assigned to the group. Ten days after its assignment, the 325th FIS moved from Travis to Hamilton. A few months later, in July, the group once again had only two operational squadrons when the 496th FIS moved to Europe and was assigned elsewhere.

The 566th was inactivated and replaced by the 78th Fighter Group (Air Defense) on 18 August 1955 as result of ADC's Project Arrow, which was designed to bring back on the active list the fighter units which had compiled memorable records in the two world wars. The group was disbanded once again in 1984.

== Lineage ==
- Constituted as 566th Air Service Group in 1944

Activated on 7 December 1944
Inactivated c. 14 August 1945
Disbanded on 8 October 1948

- Reconstituted and redesignated 566th Air Base Group on 1 January 1952

Activated on 1 February 1952
Redesignated 566th Air Defense Group on 16 February 1953
Inactivated on 18 August 1955
Disbanded on 27 September 1984

=== Assignments ===
- Warner Robins Air Technical Service Command, 7 December 1944 – c. 14 August 1945
- 4702d Defense Wing, 1 February 1952
- 28th Air Division 7 November 1952 – 18 August 1955

=== Stations ===
- Robins Field, Georgia, 7 December 1944 – c. 14 August 1945
- Hamilton Air Force Base, California, 1 February 1952 – 18 August 1955

=== Components ===
==== Operational Squadrons and Flight ====
- 84th Fighter-Interceptor Squadron, 16 February 1953 – 18 August 1955
- 325th Fighter-Interceptor Squadron, 1 February 1954 – 18 August 1955
- 496th Fighter-Interceptor Squadron, 20 March 1953 – 1 July 1954
- 13th Crash Rescue Boat Flight, 7 November 1952 – 18 August 1955

==== Support Squadrons ====
- 19th WAF (Women's Air Force) Squadron, c. 26 June 1952 – 8 August 1954
- 566th Air Police Squadron, 1 February 1952 – 18 August 1955
- 566th Food Service Squadron, 1 February 1952 – 18 August 1955
- 566th Field Maintenance Squadron, 1 February 1952 – 18 August 1955
- 566th Installations Squadron, 1 February 1952 – 18 August 1955
- 566th Medical Squadron (later 566th USAF Hospital), 1 February 1952 – 18 August 1955
- 566th Motor Vehicle Squadron, 1 February 1952 – 18 August 1955
- 566th Operations Squadron, 1 February 1952 – 18 August 1955
- 566th Supply Squadron, 1 February 1952 – 18 August 1955
- 984th Air Engineering Squadron, 7 December 1944 – c. 14 August 1945
- 1004th Air Materiel Squadron, 7 December 1944 – c. 14 August 1945

=== Aircraft ===
- North American F-51D Mustang, 1953
- North American F-86D Sabre, 1953–1954
- North American F-86E Sabre, 1954–1955
- Northrop F-89B Scorpion, 1953
- Lockheed F-94B Starfighter, 1953
- Lockheed F-94C Starfighter, 1953–1955

=== Commanders ===
- Lt Col. Charles E. Stiven, 7 December 1944 – c. April 1945
- Lt Col. Charles W. Coleman, c. April 1945 – c. 14 August 1945
- Unknown 1952 – 1955

== See also ==
- Aerospace Defense Command Fighter Squadrons
- List of F-86 Sabre units
- F-89 Scorpion units of the United States Air Force
- F-94 Starfire units of the United States Air Force
