= 78th Air Base Wing =

78th Air Base Wing

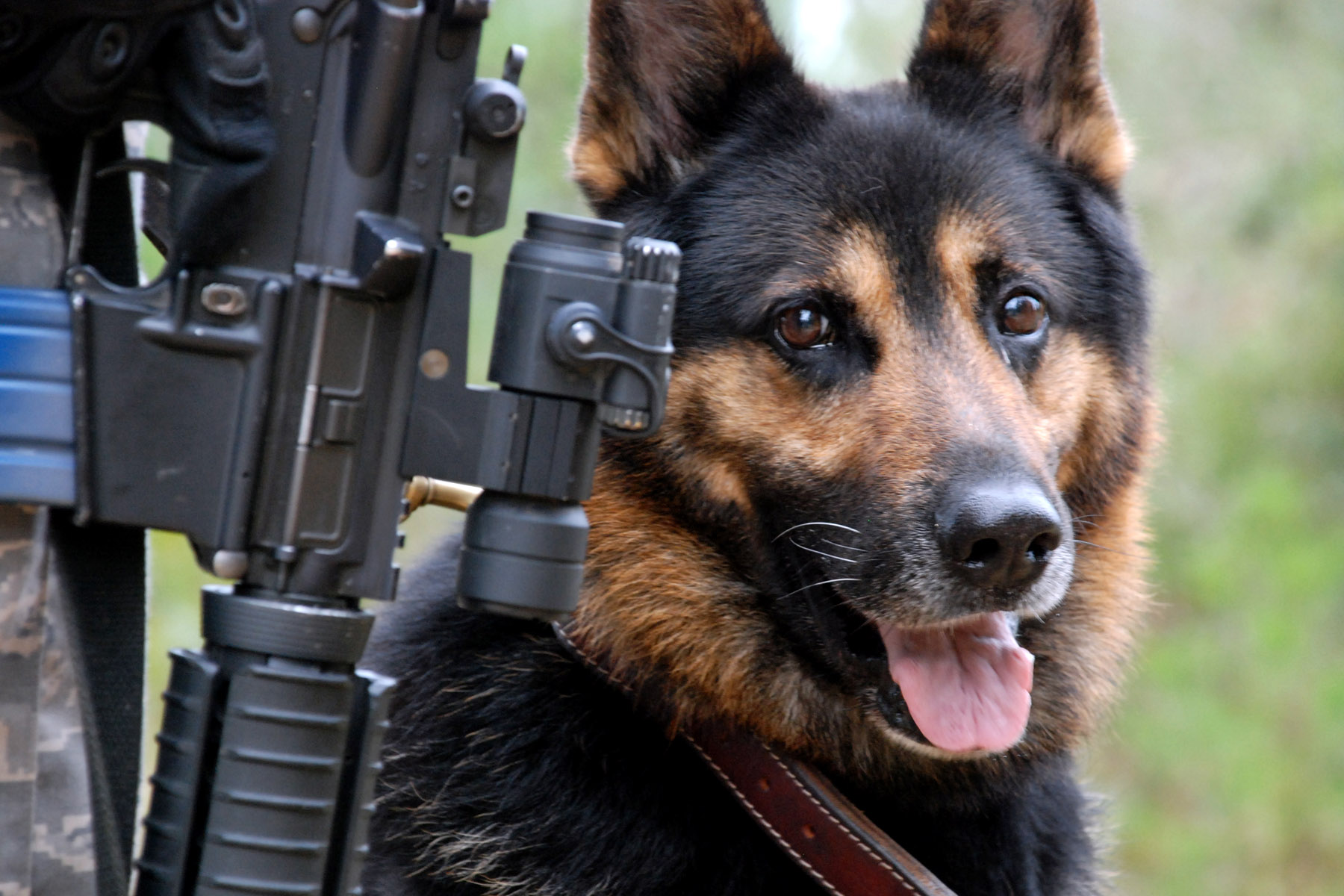
- A military working dog from the 78th Security Forces Squadron while participating in a training scenario.
- Active: 1948–1952, 1956–1969, 1972–1977, 1994–present
- Country: United States
- Branch: United States Air Force
- Role: Base support
- Part of: Air Force Materiel Command
- Garrison/HQ: Robins Air Force Base
- Motto: Above the Foe
- Decorations: Air Force Outstanding Unit Award

Commanders
- Current commander: Colonel Johari J. Hemphill

Insignia
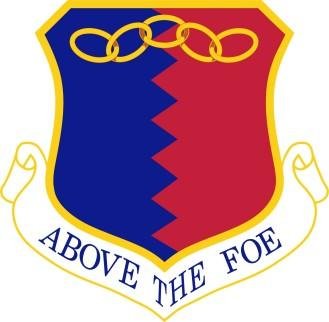
- 78th Air Base Wing emblem (Note: Approved 26 December 1995) (Note: This emblem is a slight variation on that approved for the wing on 19 March 1958 and for the 78th Fighter Group on 26 September 1942. Ravenstein, p. 115.)

The 78th Air Base Wing is a wing of the United States Air Force stationed at Robins Air Force Base, Georgia. The 78th acts as the host unit at Robins.

The wing was first activated as the 78th Fighter Wing in September 1948 as part of the wing base reorganization. It performed air defense duties on the Pacific Coast until 1952, when it was inactivated in a general reorganization of Air Defense Command. The wing was again activated in 1956 and continued the air defense mission until 1969.

In 1972, Air Training Command replaced its MAJCON 3560th Pilot Training Wing at Webb Air Force Base with the unit, then designated the 78th Flying Training Wing. The wing continued to train pilots at Webb until 1977, when Webb was closed.

== Units ==
- 78th Civil Engineer Group
- 78th Mission Support Group

78th Logistics Readiness Squadron
78th Force Support Squadron
78th Security Forces Squadron

- 78th Medical Group
- 78th Operations Support Squadron
- 78th Contracting and Comptroller Squadron
- 78th Communications Directorate

== History ==
The 78th Fighter Group flew missions from the United Kingdom during the Second World War, then moving to the Continent and finally returning home in October 1945.

=== Air Defense Command ===
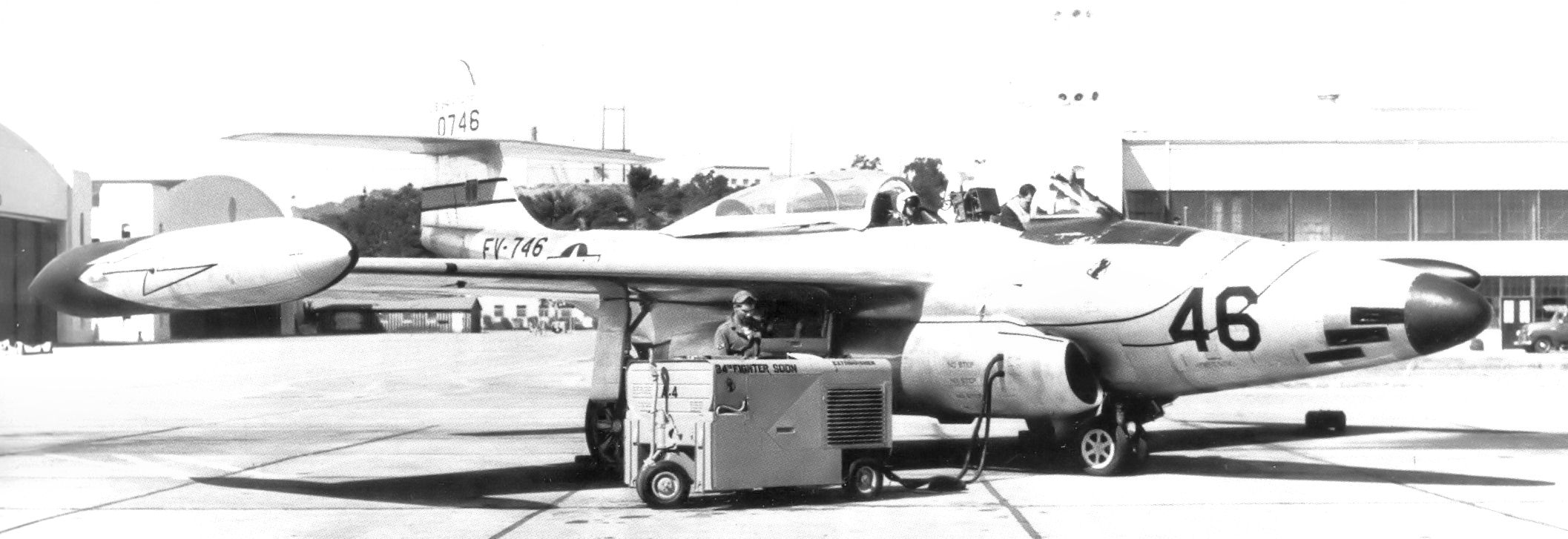
84th Fighter-Interceptor Squadron F-89 (Note: Aircraft is Northrop F-89C-5-NO Scorpion 50-746 preparing for takeoff on a training mission. Stationed at Hamilton AFB, 1952.)

On 24 September 1948 the 78th Fighter Wing was established at Hamilton Air Force Base, California by the Hobson Plan, with the 78th Fighter Group becoming a component of the wing, controlling its flying resources.

It was redesignated the 78th Fighter-Interceptor Wing in January 1950 as part of Air Defense Command. The group's squadrons (82d, 83d, 84th FIS) flew numerous interceptors for West Coast air defense. Inactivated on 6 February 1952 as part of a reorganization of ADC, its operational element was replaced by the 4702d Defense Wing. Its support elements were replaced at Hamilton by the 566th Air Base Group the same day. This group was redesignated the 566th Air Defense Group and assumed operational responsibilities at Hamilton on 16 February 1953. On 18 August 1955, the 566th Air Defense Group was replaced by a former element of the wing, the 78th Fighter Group (Air Defense).

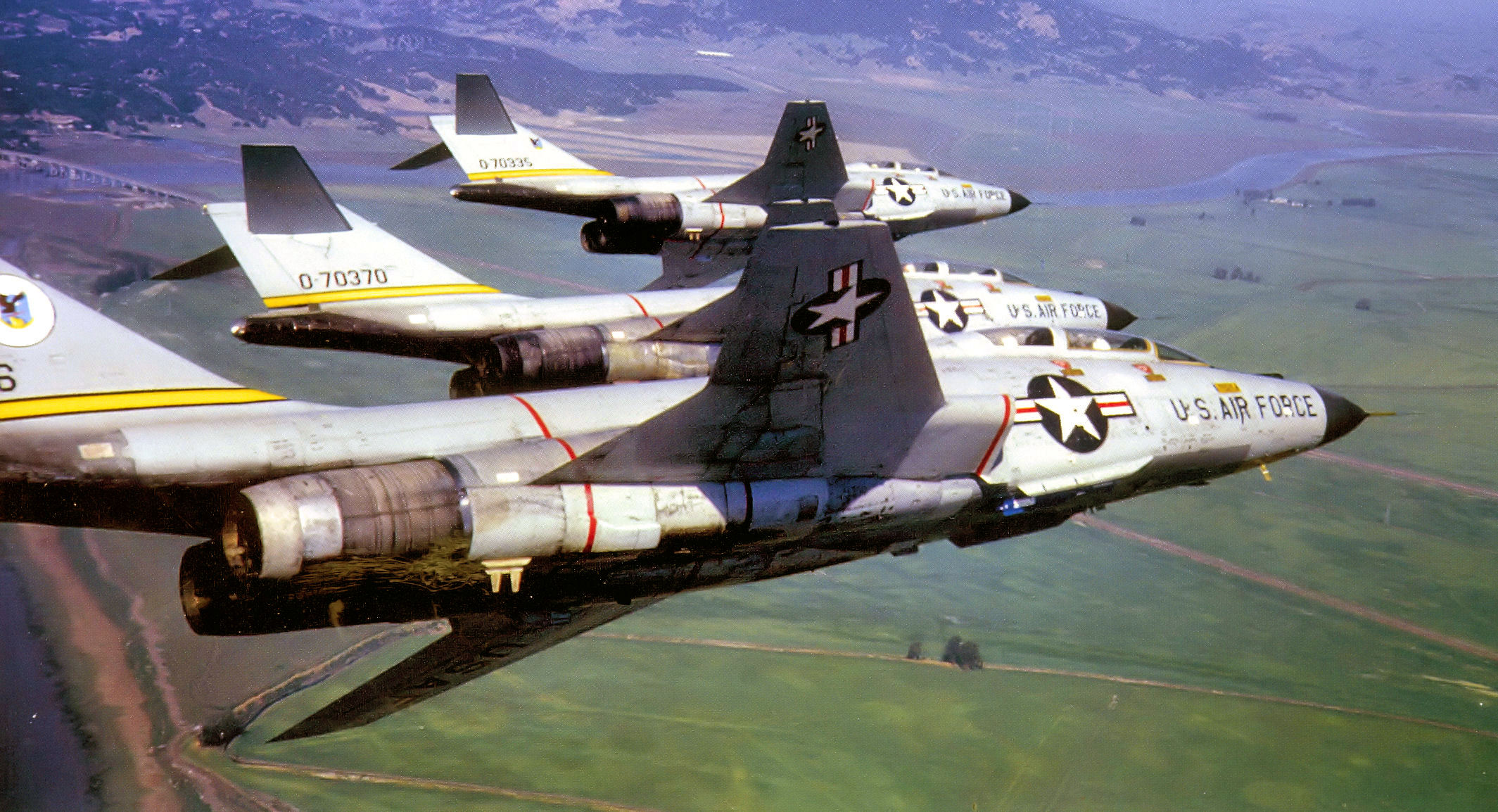
84th Fighter-Interceptor Squadron F-101s (Note: Aircraft is McDonnell F-101B-95-MC Voodoo serial 57-0370 is identifiable. Taken at Hamilton AFB in May 1968.)

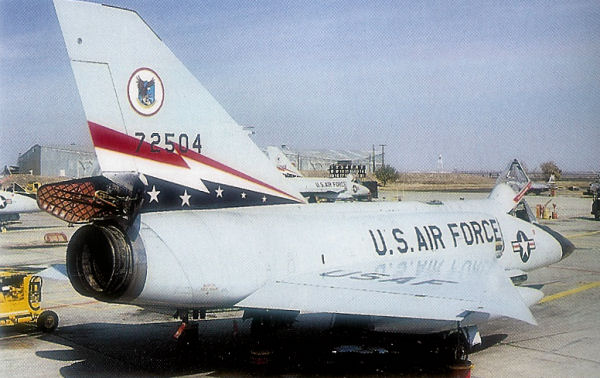
84th Fighter-Interceptor Squadron F-106 (Note: Aircraft is Convair F-106A-90-CO Delta Dart serial 57-2504. This aircraft served in ADC and ADTAC for many years until being retired in 1988, then being expended as a QF-106 drone on 2 August 1993.)

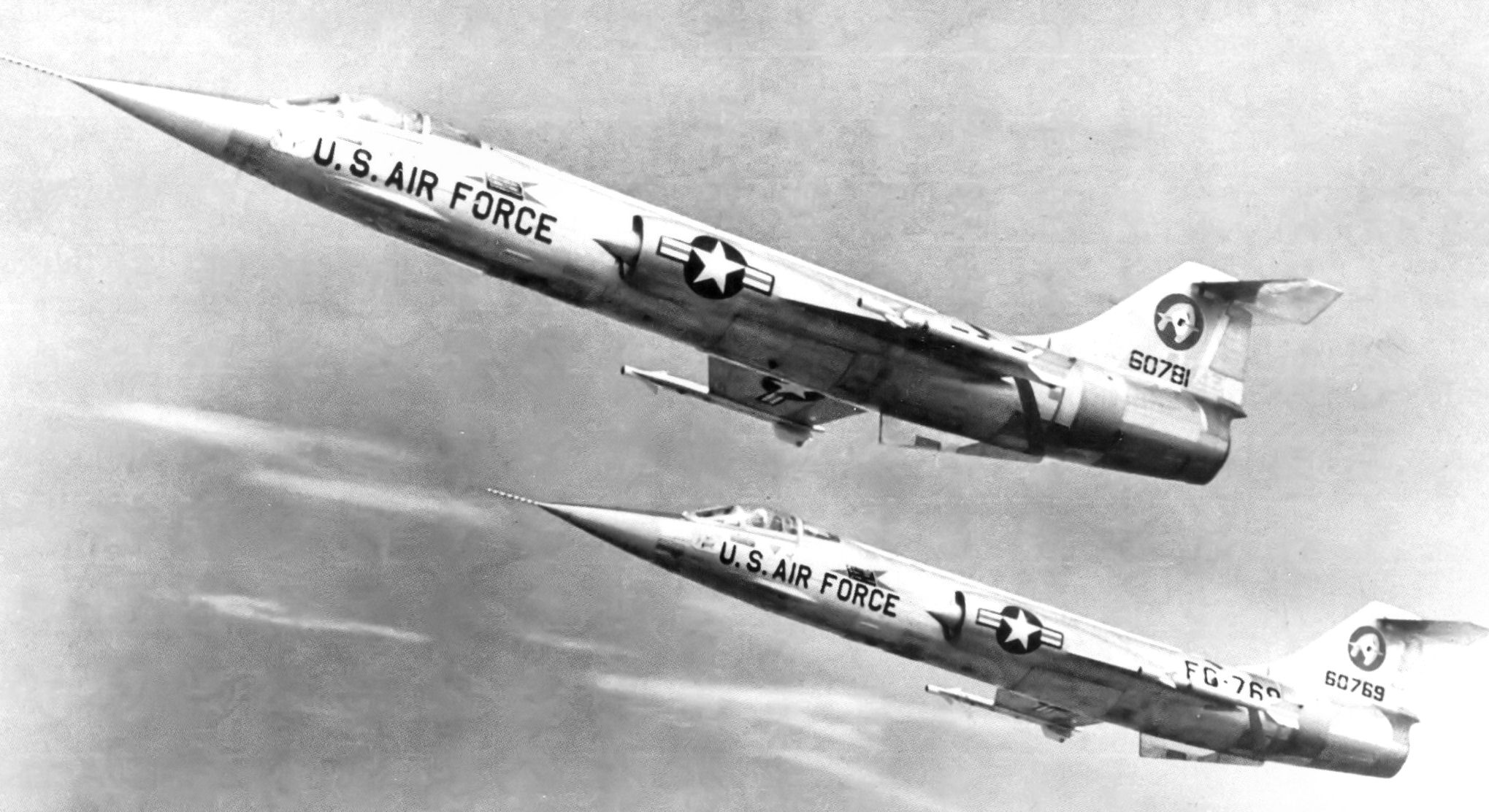
83d Fighter-Interceptor Squadron F-1042 (Note: Visible Lockheed F-104A Starfighters are serials 56-0781 and 58-0769. Taken at Hamilton AFB in 1958.)

In 1956, it was decided to elevate the operational units at Hamilton back to a Wing level, and the wing was reactivated, with its operational squadrons still controlled by the 78th Fighter Group. The group component of the wing was considered to be a redundant level of organization by the late 1950s, and the 78th FIG was inactivated on 1 February 1961, with its flying units being directly assigned to the Wing.

The 78th Fighter Wing was the host unit at Hamilton until it was inactivated at the end of December 1969 and its mission, equipment were transferred to the 1st Fighter Wing, which transferred to Hamilton on paper from Selfridge Air Force Base, Michigan.

=== Air Training Command ===
The 78th Flying Training Wing replaced and absorbed resources of the 3560th Pilot Training Wing at Webb Air Force Base, Texas, on 1 December 1972. Squadrons were 82d, 83d, 3389th Flying Training Sqdns. The wing performed pilot training for both USAF and allied officers.

In 1977 the end of the Vietnam War meant a decrease in the need for Air Force pilots and Webb was closed. The 78th FTW was inactivated.

In 1989 the Dutch government allowed USAF to upgrade its headquarters unit at Soesterberg AB from squadron to group status. The story goes that the USAF wanted to change the 32d into the 78th TFG but that the Dutch government didn't allow another number as not to stir up the people who were against the American presence in the Netherlands.

=== Robins AFB ===
Since its reactivation in 1994, the 78th Air Base Wing has provided host services and support for the Warner-Robins Air Logistics Center and its tenant organizations.

== Lineage ==
- Constituted as the 78th Fighter Wing on 24 September 1948

Activated on 16 November 1948
Redesignated 78th Fighter-Interceptor Wing on 20 January 1950
Inactivated on 6 February 1952

- Redesignated as 78th Fighter Wing (Air Defense) on 14 September 1956

Activated on 18 October 1956
Inactivated on 31 December 1969

- Redesignated 78th Flying Training Wing on 14 April 1972

Activated on 1 December 1972
Inactivated on 30 September 1977

- Redesignated 78th Air Base Wing on 16 September 1994

Activated on 1 October 1994

=== Assignments ===
- Fourth Air Force, 16 November 1948

Attached to Western Air Defense Force, 10 November 1949 – 31 July 1950

- Western Air Defense Force, 1 August 1950 – 6 February 1952
- 28th Air Division, 18 October 1956
- San Francisco Air Defense Sector, 1 July 1960
- 28th Air Division, 1 August 1963
- 26th Air Division, 1 April 1966
- 27th Air Division, 15 September 1969
- Tenth Air Force, 19 November-31 December 1969
- Air Training Command, 1 December 1972 – 30 September 1977
- Warner Robins Air Logistics Center (later Warner Robins Air Logistics Complex), 1 October 1994 1 October 2012 (attached to Air Force Sustainment Center after 17 July 2012)
- Air Force Sustainment Center, 1 October 2012 – Present

=== Components ===
==== Groups ====
- 78th Fighter (later, 78th Fighter-Interceptor, 78th Fighter) Group: 16 November 1948 – 6 February 1952; 18 October 1956 – 1 February 1961
- 78th Air Base Group (later 78th Combat Support Group, 78th Air Base Group, 78th Support Group, 78th Mission Support Group): 16 November 1948 – 6 February 1952; 18 October 1956 – 31 December 1969; 1 September 1972 – 30 September 1977; 1 October 1994 – present
- 78th Maintenance & Supply Group (later 78th Logistics Group): 16 November 1948 – 6 February 1952; 8 July 1957 – 1 February 1961; 1 August 1998 – 19 September 2002
- 78th Station Medical Group (later 78th Medical Group, 78th USAF Hospital, 78th Medical Group): 16 November 1948 – 6 February 1952; 18 October 1956 – 31 December 1969; 1 October 1994 – present

==== Squadrons ====
- 82d Fighter-Interceptor (later, Flying Training): 1 December 1972 – 15 June 1976 (attached 9 January 1957 – 1 July 1960)
- 83d Fighter-Interceptor (later, Flying Training): 1 February 1961 – 1 July 1963; 1 December 1972 – 30 September 1977
- 84th Fighter-Interceptor Squadron: 1 February 1961 – 31 December 1969
- 3389th Flying Training Squadron: 1 January 1974 – 30 September 1977.

=== Stations ===
- Hamilton Air Force Base, California, 16 November 1948 – 6 November 1952
- Hamilton Air Force Base, California, 18 October 1956 – 31 December 1969.
- Webb Air Force Base, Texas, 1 December 1972 – 30 September 1977
- Robins Air Force Base, Georgia, 1 October 1994–present

=== Aircraft ===
- North American P-51 Mustang (1949–52)
- Republic F-84 Thunderjet (1949–52)
- Northrop F-89 Scorpion (1951–52, 1956–59)
- North American F-86 Sabre (1956–58)
- Convair F-102 Delta Dagger (1957–60)
- Lockheed F-104 Starfighter (1958–60)
- McDonnell F-101 Voodoo (1959–68)
- Convair F-106 Delta Dart (1959–60, 1968–69)
- Cessna T-37 Tweet (1972–77)
- Northrop T-38 Talon (1972–77)
- Cessna T-41 Mescalero (1972–73)

== See also ==
- Aerospace Defense Command Fighter Squadrons
