= Straubing Wallmühle Airport =

Flugplatz Straubing-Wallmühle
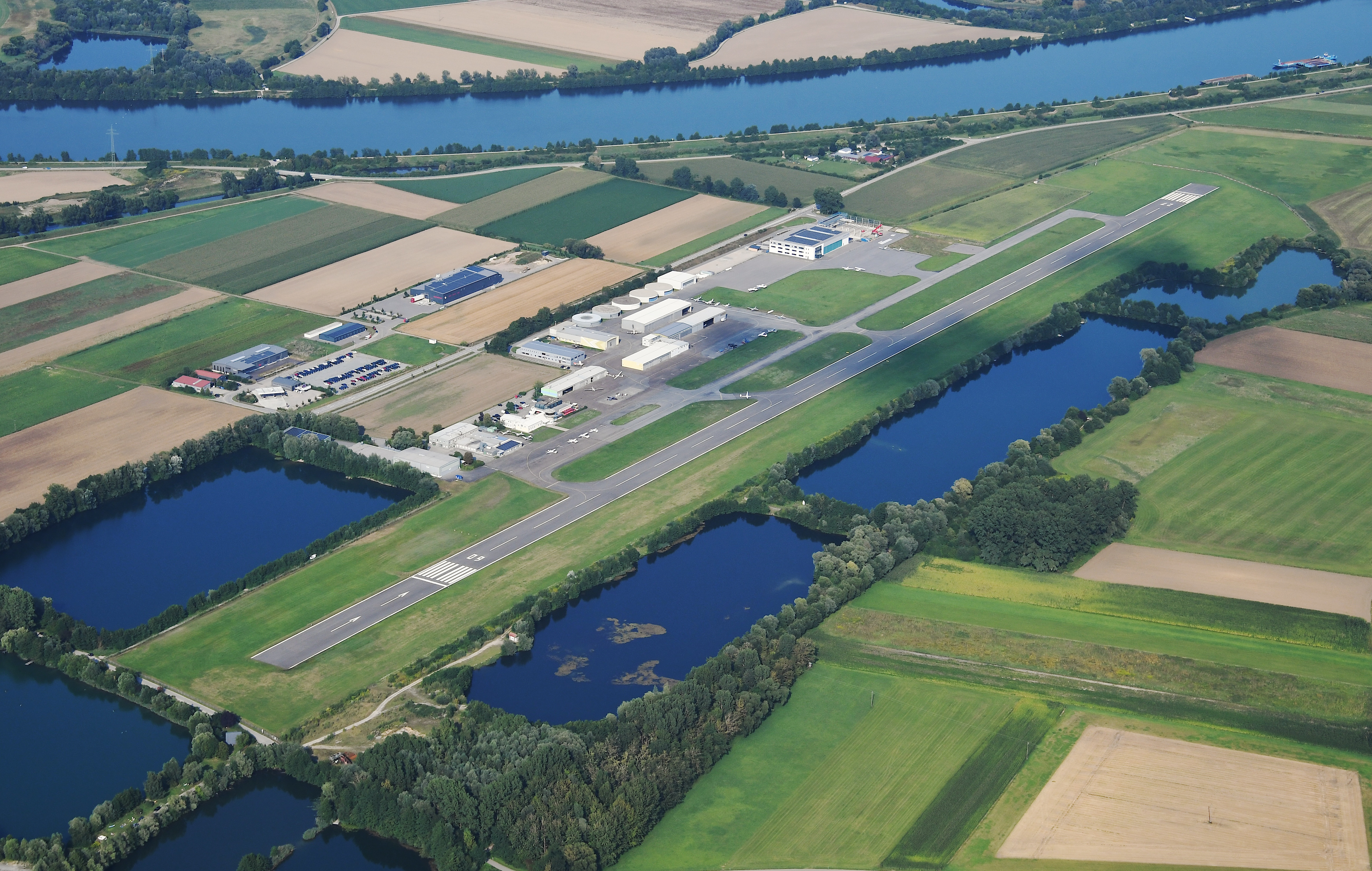
- IATA: RBM; ICAO: EDMS

Summary
- Airport type: Public
- Location: Straubing, Germany
- Elevation AMSL: 1,054 ft / 321 m
- Coordinates: 48°54′05″N 012°31′03″E
- Website: airport-straubing.com

Map

Runways
| Direction | Length | | Surface |
| Direction | ft | m | Surface |
|---|---|---|---|
| 10/28 | 4,429 | 1,350 | Asphalt |
- AIP at German air traffic control.

Straubing Wallmühle Airport (IATA: RBM, ICAO: EDMS) is a minor German regional airport, located about 3 miles north-northwest of Straubing in Bavaria. It is used for general aviation.

== History ==
Today's Straubing Airfield was founded at the beginning of the 1960s by several flight enthusiasts from Straubing. At first, only gliding operations with winch towing took place. In 1972, Straubing-Wallmühle Airfield was founded as a limited liability company by the two shareholders, the city of Straubing and the district of Straubing-Bogen. Since that time, the airport has been a public transport company (Verkehrslandeplatz) with a daily duty to operate at binding opening times.

== Airlines and destinations ==
As of April 2016, there are no scheduled services to or from Straubing. Briefly, during early 2016, Danish charter airline Flexflight offered services between Straubing and Salzburg Airport. Flights were later moved from Straubing to Augsburg Airport.
