= Vermont Air National Guard =

Unit of the US Air National Guard for the State of Vermont

- F-35A Lightning II of the 134th Fighter Squadron flying over Burlington ANGB. The 134th is the oldest unit in the Vermont Air National Guard, having over 70 years of service to the state and nation.
- Active: 14 August 1946 – present
- Country: United States
- Allegiance: Vermont
- Branch: Air National Guard
- Type: State militia, military reserve force
- Role: "To meet state and federal mission responsibilities."
- Part of: Vermont Military Department; United States National Guard Bureau; National Guard
- Garrison/HQ: Vermont Air National Guard, Burlington Air National Guard Base, 105 NCO Drive, South Burlington, VT 05403
- Nickname: "Green Mountain Boys"
- Website: https://www.158fw.ang.af.mil/

Commanders
- Civilian leadership: President Donald Trump (Commander-in-Chief); Troy Meink (Secretary of the Air Force); Governor Phil Scott (Governor of the State of Vermont)
- State military leadership: Major General Henry U. Harder

Insignia
- Emblem of the Vermont Air National Guard (158th Fighter Wing)

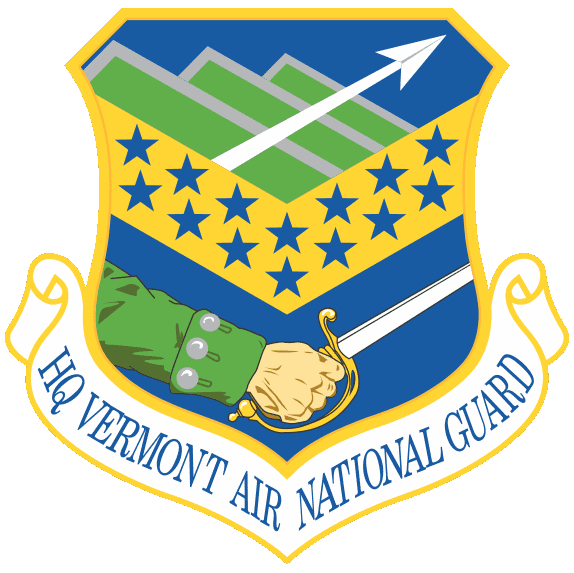
- Headquarters Vermont Air National Guard emblem

Aircraft flown
- Fighter: F-94A/B Starfire, F-89D Scorpion, F/TF-102A Delta Dagger, EB-57B/E Canberra, F-4D Phantom II, F-16A/B/C/D Fighting Falcon, Lockheed Martin F-35 Lightning II

The Vermont Air National Guard (VT ANG) is the aerial militia of the State of Vermont, United States of America. It is a reserve of the United States Air Force and along with the Vermont Army National Guard an element of the Vermont National Guard of the larger United States National Guard Bureau. The 158th Fighter Wing is its sole unit. It is under the jurisdiction of the governor of Vermont through the office of the Vermont Adjutant General unless they are federalized by order of the president of the United States. The Vermont Air National Guard is headquartered at Burlington Air National Guard Base. As of 2019, the Vermont Air National Guard is the first Air National Guard unit to be assigned the Lockheed Martin F-35A Lightning II.

== Overview ==
Under the "Total Force" concept, Vermont Air National Guard units are considered to be Air Reserve Components (ARC) of the United States Air Force (USAF). Vermont ANG units are trained and equipped by the Air Force and are operationally gained by a major command of the USAF if federalized. In addition, the Vermont Air National Guard forces are assigned to Air Expeditionary Forces and are subject to deployment tasking orders along with their active duty and Air Force Reserve counterparts in their assigned cycle deployment window.

Along with their federal reserve obligations, as state militia units the elements of the Vermont ANG are subject to being activated by order of the governor to provide protection of life and property, and preserve peace, order and public safety. State missions include disaster relief in times of earthquakes, hurricanes, floods and forest fires, search and rescue, protection of vital public services, and support to civil defense.

== History ==
On 24 May 1946, the United States Army Air Forces, in response to dramatic postwar military budget cuts imposed by President Harry S. Truman, allocated inactive unit designations to the National Guard Bureau for the formation of an Air Force National Guard. These unit designations were allotted and transferred to various State National Guard bureaus to provide them unit designations to re-establish them as Air National Guard units.

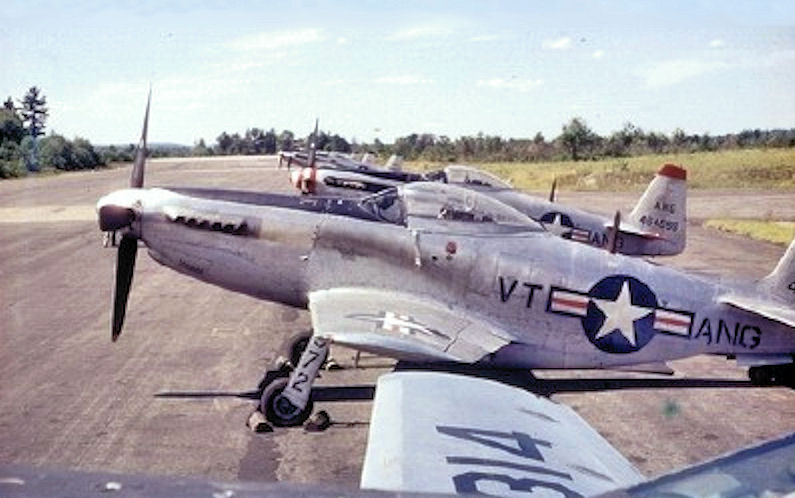
F-51H Mustangs of the 134th Fighter Squadron at Burlington Airport, 1952

The Vermont Air National Guard origins date to the formation of the 134th Fighter Squadron at Burlington International Airport, receiving federal recognition on 14 August 1946. It was equipped with F-47D Thunderbolts and its mission was the air defense of the state. It was assigned initially directly to the Vermont Air National Guard until the Massachusetts ANG 67th Fighter Wing, was federally recognized on 15 October 1946. The 67th Fighter Wing was the first ANG command and control organization in New England. On 4 April 1947, it was transferred to the Maine ANG 101st Fighter Group.

During the Korean War, the 134th was federalized on 10 February 1951 and assigned to the federalized Maine ANG 101st Fighter-Interceptor Wing, although it initially remained stationed at Burlington Airport. Its mission was expanded to include the air defense of New England. The squadron was then attached to the Air Defense Command 23d Fighter-Interceptor Wing at Presque Isle AFB, Maine on 1 April 1951 with no change of mission. It was reassigned to the 4711th Defense Wing on 6 February 1952 at Presque Isle AFB. It was released from active duty and returned to control of State of Vermont on 1 November 1952. On 1 May 1956 the 134th was authorized to expand to a group level, and the 158th Fighter Group (Air Defense) was established by the National Guard Bureau; the 134th FIS becoming the group's flying squadron.

In line with an Air Force-wide redesignation, the wing became simply the 158th Fighter Wing in 1992. Today the Vermont Air National Guard provides air defense as part of the United States Northern Command (USNORTHCOM)/North American Aerospace Defense Command (NORAD) in time of war or national emergency for the defense of the North American continent. From 1989 to 1997 the wing had aircraft on 5-minute alert, seven days a week, 24 hours a day.

After the September 11 attacks, elements of every Air National Guard unit in Vermont has been activated in support of the global war on terrorism. Flight crews, aircraft maintenance personnel, communications technicians, air controllers and air security personnel were engaged in Operation Noble Eagle air defense overflights of major United States cities. Also, Vermont ANG units have been deployed overseas as part of Operation Enduring Freedom in Afghanistan and Operation Iraqi Freedom in Iraq as well as other locations as directed.

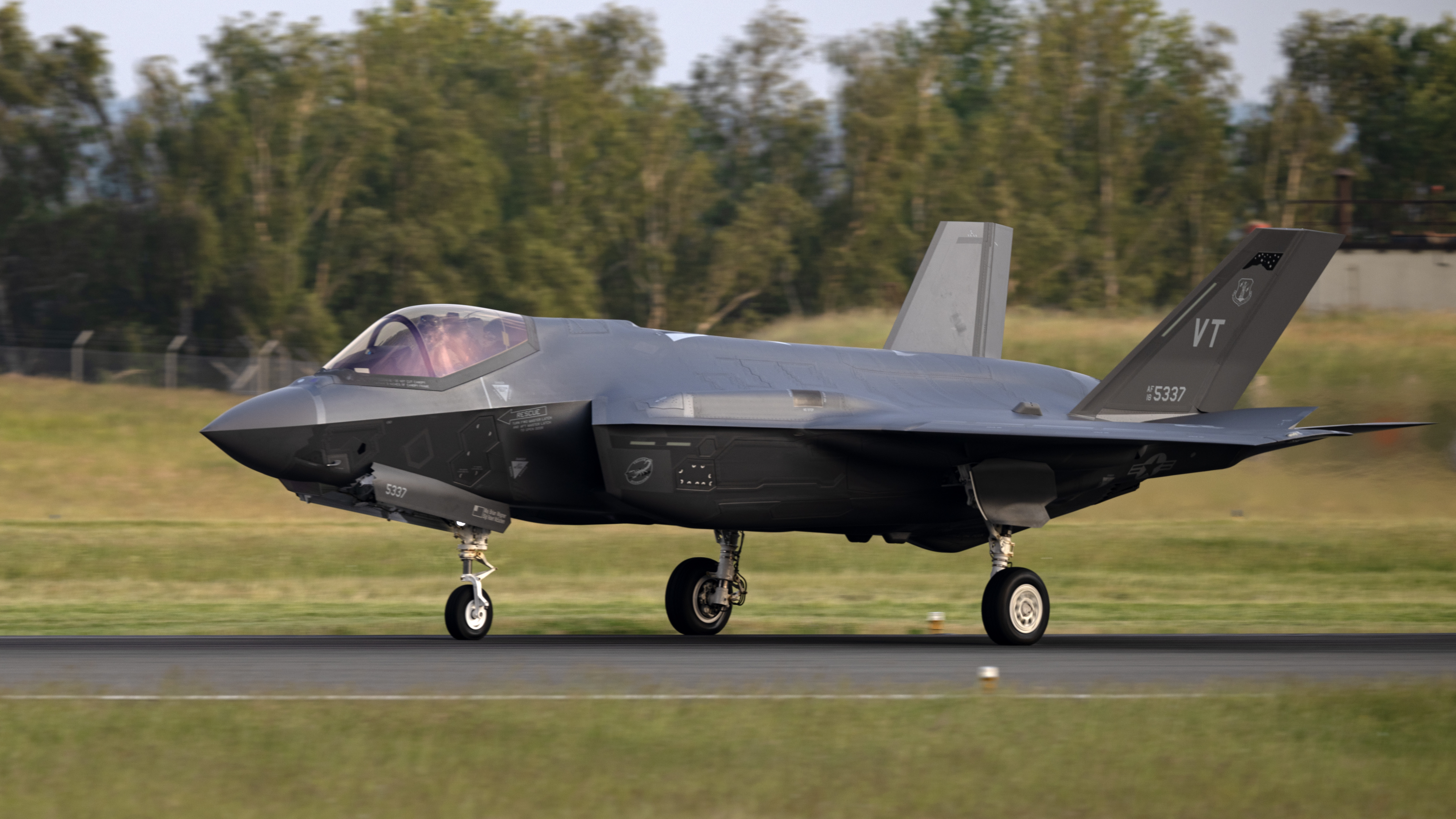
134th Fighter Squadron F-35A Lightning II at Spangdahlem Air Base, Germany

In December 2013 the USAF announced the first US Air Force Air National Guard unit to fly the new F-35 Lightning II will be the 158th Fighter Wing of the Vermont Air National Guard based at the Burlington Air Guard Station.

The last of the Vermont Air National Guard F-16s left in April 2019 to make way for the arrival of the F-35 later that year.

On September 19, 2019, the first two F-35s arrived at Burlington International Airport with another eighteen being delivered at later dates.

== See also ==
- Vermont State Guard
- Vermont Wing Civil Air Patrol
