= 134th Fighter Squadron =

Vermont Air National Guard unit

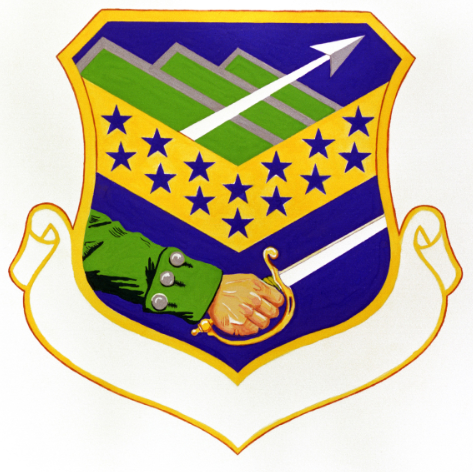
134th Fighter Squadron

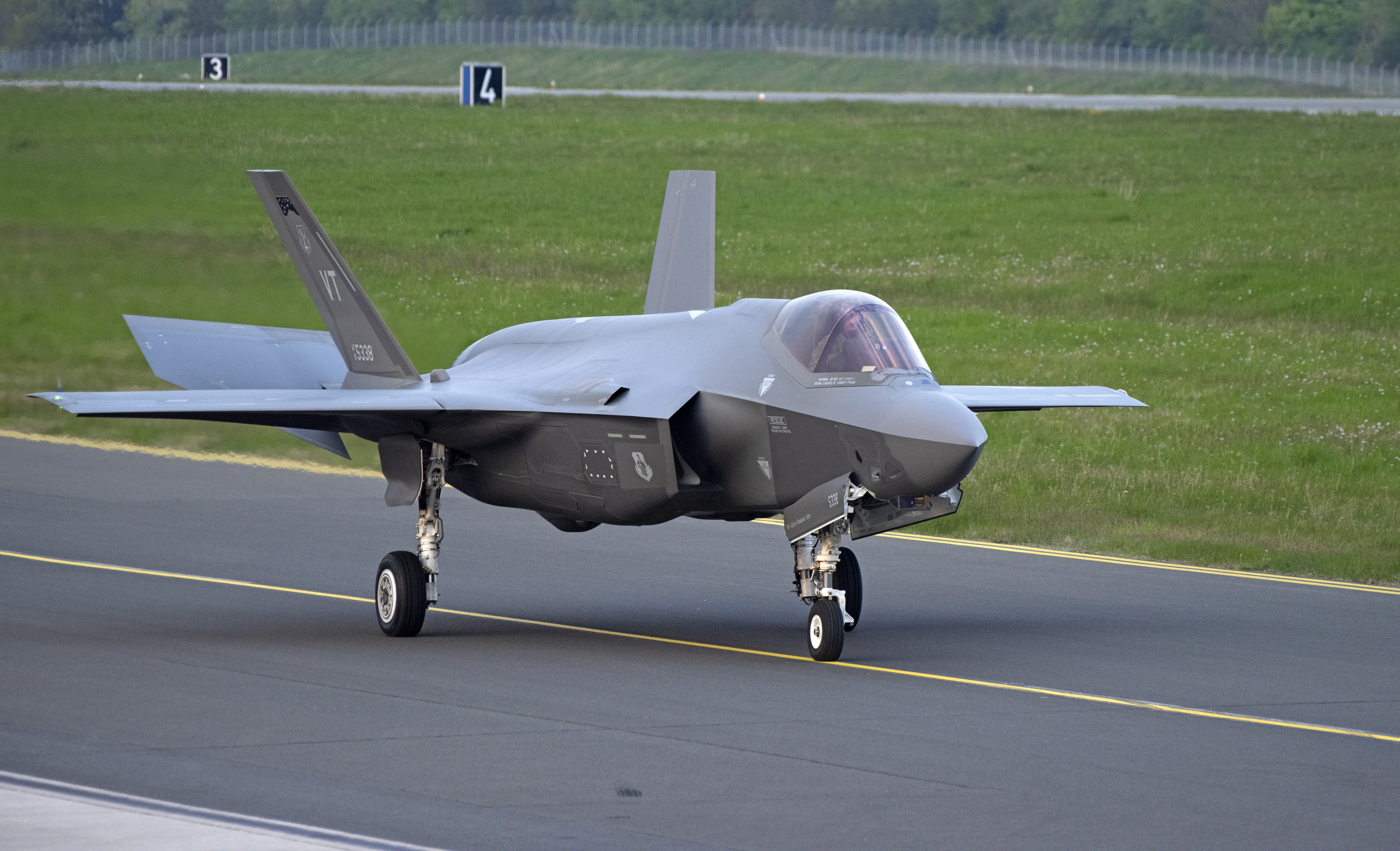
- 134th F-35A Lightning II taxiing at Spangdahlem AB, 2022
- Active: 1942–1946; 1946–1952; 1952–present
- Country: United States of America
- Branch: Air National Guard
- Type: Squadron
- Role: Fighter, Wild Weasel
- Part of: Vermont Air National Guard
- Garrison/HQ: Burlington Air National Guard Base, Vermont
- Nickname: Yellow Scorpions (1943-1946) The Green Mountain Boys (since 1946)
- Engagements: China-Burma-India Theater
- Decorations: Air Force Meritorious Unit Award; Air Force Outstanding Unit Award

Insignia
- 134th Fighter Squadron emblem

- 530th Fighter Squadron emblem

- 384th Bombardment Squadron emblem (Note: Approved 16 April 1943)
- Tail code: VT (Note: Previously a green tailband with yellow text 'Vermont' included. A standing man fills the entire tail with the serial underneath. On the tailbase the words "The Green Mountain Boys" are painted.)

Aircraft flown
- Fighter: Lockheed Martin F-35 Lightning II

The 134th Fighter Squadron, nicknamed the Green Mountain Boys, is a unit of the Vermont Air National Guard 158th Fighter Wing located at Burlington Air National Guard Base, Vermont. Since 2019, the 134th has flown the Lockheed Martin F-35 Lightning II.

The unit traces its history to the 384th Bombardment Squadron (Light), activated in March 1942. After training in the United States, it deployed to India in 1943. As the 530th Fighter Squadron, it engaged in combat in Southeast Asia, and later, China until V-J Day. The squadron remained in China until February 1946, when it was inactivated.

The squadron was allotted to the National Guard in May 1946 as the 134th Fighter Squadron (Note: This unit is not related to the 134th Squadron (Observation) which was constituted in the National Guard in 1921 and assigned to III Corps. It was placed on the deferred list on 2 July 1923 and transferred to the Organized Reserve as a Deferred National Guard unit. Concurrently redesignated as the 553rd Observation Squadron and assigned to the 328th Observation Group. It was withdrawn from allotment to the National Guard and the Third Corps Area on 17 September 1927 and disbanded. There is no indication it was manned or equipped. Clay, p. 1454.) and was organized three months later. With the exception of the years 1974 to 1982, when it was the 134th Defense Systems Evaluation Squadron it has flown fighters since then. The squadron was called to active duty during the Korean War, serving in the air defense of the Northeast as the 134th Fighter-Interceptor Squadron. The squadron has deployed personnel and aircraft for operations in Southwest Asia and for the defense of the homeland.

== Mission ==
The squadron mission is to carry out counter air operations, global force integration and to maintain tactical combat readiness. It is also tasked with carrying out the Suppression of Enemy Air Defenses mission.

== History ==
=== World War II ===
==== Training in the United States ====
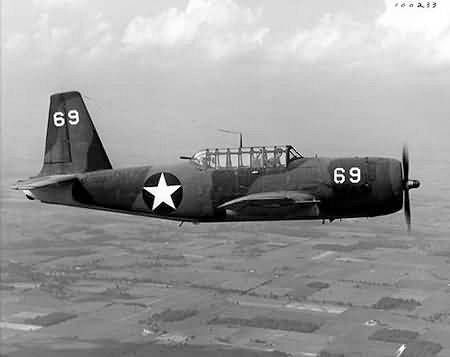
Vultee Vengeance of a training unit in the United States. (Note: Note the American national insigne, but Royal Air Force camouflage.)

The squadron was first activated as the 384th Bombardment Squadron at Will Rogers Field, Oklahoma in March 1942 as one of the four original squadrons of the 311th Bombardment Group. The squadron moved to Georgia in July, where it trained at Hunter Field and Waycross Army Air Field for the following year. It primarily trained with Vultee V-72 Vengeance dive bombers, which had been ordered for the Royal Air Force, but which were impressed by the Army Air Forces after the United States entered World War II. Toward the end of its training, it also flew some North American A-36A Apaches. In July 1943, the squadron left the United States for the China-Burma-India Theater via Australia.

==== Combat in the China-Burma-India Theater ====
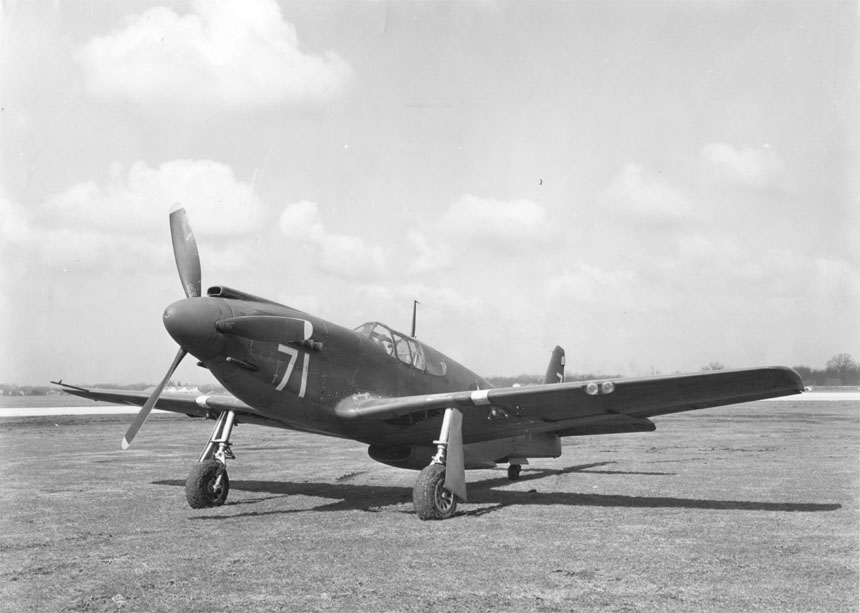
A-36 Apache as flown by the squadron

The squadron arrived at Nawadih Airfield, India in mid-September 1943 and began to equip with A-36 Apaches, converting to the fighter version, the North American P-51 Mustang by 1944. Shortly after its arrival, the AAF redesignated its single engine bomber units and the squadron became the 530th Fighter-Bomber Squadron. The squadron flew its first combat mission on 16 October. The group provided air support to Allied ground forces in Northern Burma. It provided escorts for Consolidated B-24 Liberator and North American B-25 Mitchell bombers attacking Rangoon, Insein and other targets in Burma. It bombed Japanese airfields in Myitkyina and Bhamo. It conducted patrol and reconnaissance missions to protect transport planes flying cargo over The Hump between India and China. The squadron continued to support ground forces, including Merrill's Marauders. It also flew fighter sweeps over enemy airfields in central and southern Burma.

In late August 1944 the 311th Group was assigned to Fourteenth Air Force and the squadron moved to Kwanghan Airfield, China in October. The squadron escorted bombers, flew interception missions against attacking Japanese aircraft, struck the enemy's lines of communications, and supported ground operations. It provided fighter cover for Boeing B-29 Superfortresses returning from raids on Japan from advanced bases in China. The squadron continued combat operations until V-J day. It was credited with the destruction of 75 enemy aircraft, with Captain James England, credited with 10 victories, its highest scoring ace. The squadron remained in China, moving to Shanghai in October. It ferried P-51s from India to equip the Chinese Air Force in November. The squadron departed China in December 1945. Upon its arrival at Fort Lawton, Washington, the Port of Embarkation, in January 1946, it was inactivated.

=== Vermont Air National Guard ===
The 530th was redesignated the 134th Fighter Squadron and allotted to the National Guard on 24 May 1946. It was organized at the Burlington International Airport, Vermont, and was extended federal recognition on 14 August 1946. The 134th was the fifth Air National Guard unit to be formed and federally recognized. Its primary mission was air defense, with a secondary mission of ground attack. It also had an emergency rescue responsibility, using a Douglas C-47 Skytrain equipped with rubber ife rafts and maintained a crash rescue boat on Lake Champlain.

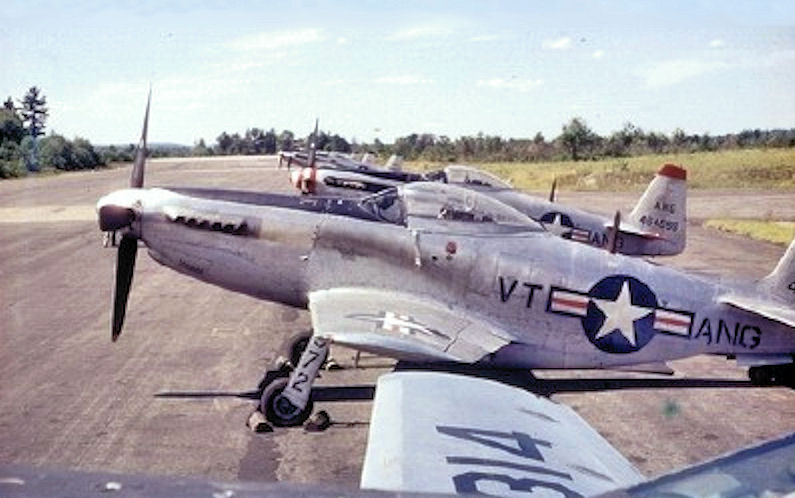
134th Fighter Squadron F-51H Mustangs at Grenier Field, 1950

The 134th flew trainers until 1947, when it was equipped with Republic P-47D Thunderbolts. It was assigned initially directly to the Vermont Air National Guard until the Massachusetts National Guard's 67th Fighter Wing was federally recognized on 15 October 1946. The 67th Fighter Wing was the first National Guard command organization in New England. On 4 April 1947, the squadron was transferred to the 101st Fighter Group. During President Harry S Truman's inauguration in January 1949, all 24 of the squadron's F-47s joined in a flypast marking the event. In 1950, the Thunderbolts were replaced by F-51H Mustangs.

=== Korean War Mobilization ===
On 1 February 1951, the squadron was called to active duty for the Korean War. A few days later, it was redesignated the 134th Fighter-Interceptor Squadron on 10 February 1951. Upon mobilization, the 134th was assigned to the 101st Fighter-Interceptor Wing and remained at Burlington Airport. The squadron was attached to the 23d Fighter-Interceptor Wing at Presque Isle Air Force Base, Maine on 1 April 1951 with no change of mission. It participated in Operation Snowfall, a test of cold weather operations at the end of 1951.

Air Defense Command had difficulty under the existing wing base organizational structure in deploying its fighter squadrons to the best advantage. As it reorganized, The 23rd Wing was inactivated on 6 February 1952 and the squadron was transferred to the recently activated 4711th Defense Wing, a regional organization which replaced the 23rd Wing. On 1 November 1952, the 133rd was released from active duty and returned to the control of the State of New Hampshire. It transferred its mission, personnel, and aircraft to the active-duty 37th Fighter-Interceptor Squadron, which was activated on the same day.

=== Return to the Air National Guard air defense mission ===
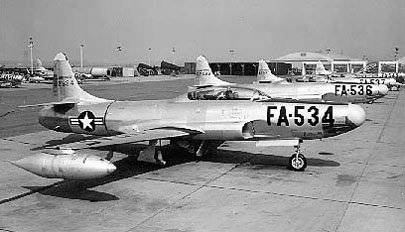
F94 Starfire as flown by the squadron

On its return to Vermont control, the squadron was assigned to the 101st Fighter-Interceptor Group. In 1953, the squadron began preparing to transition to jet fighters, and received its first Lockheed T-33 T-Bird. The squadron received its first Lockheed F-94 Starfire on 16 June 1953. In April 1954, the squadron's parent group, the 101st Fighter-Interceptor Group, of the Maine Air National Guard was inactivated. It was reactivated in June in the Vermont Air National Guard, an arrangement that continued until April 1956, when the squadron was assigned directly to the 101st Air Defense Wing.

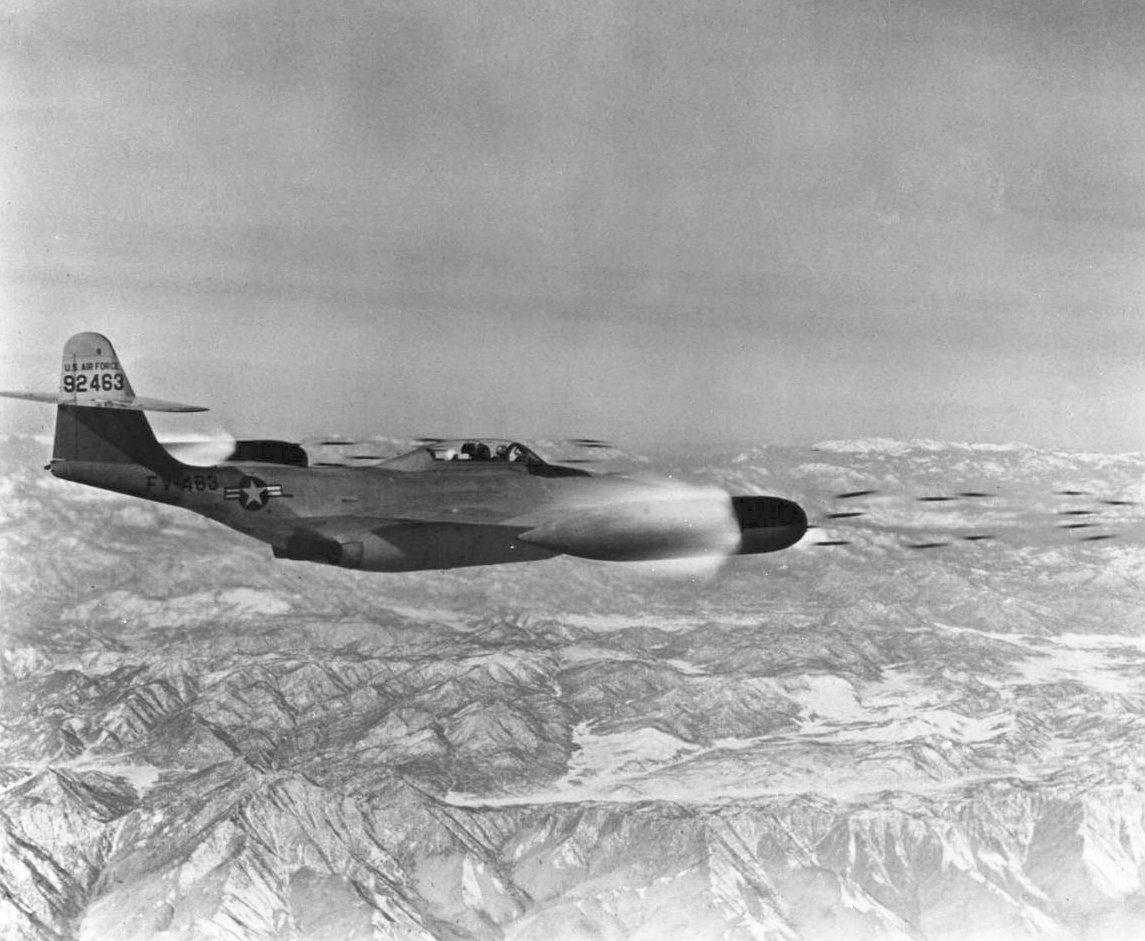
F-89D Scorpion firing missiles

The aging F-94s were replaced by twin-engine Northrop F-89D Scorpion fighters, armed with FFAR rockets, in 1958. Two years later F-89Js replaced the D models. The F-89J was designed to carry two MB-1 Genie nuclear-armed air-to-air rockets under its wings. The squadron now maintained ground alert 24 hours a day.

Since 1950, the Air National Guard had been organized into wings, self-sustaining organizations, made up of functional groups. Because it was not practical to put an entire wing on a single installation for day-to-day operations, squadrons like the 134th were located on bases as “augmented squadrons” containing support elements needed to sustain operations. By the law at the time Guardsmen could only be activated as members of a mobilized unit. This meant that, even when only operational and maintenance elements were needed for mobilization, the entire “augmented squadron” had to be called to active duty, including unneeded administrative personnel. The response was to replace the “augmented squadron” with a group including functional squadrons that could be mobilized as a group, or individually. On 1 July 1960, the 158th Fighter Group was organized. The 134th became the group's flying squadron. New organizations of the group were the 158th Material Squadron (maintenance and supply), 158th Air Base Squadron, and the 158th USAF Dispensary.

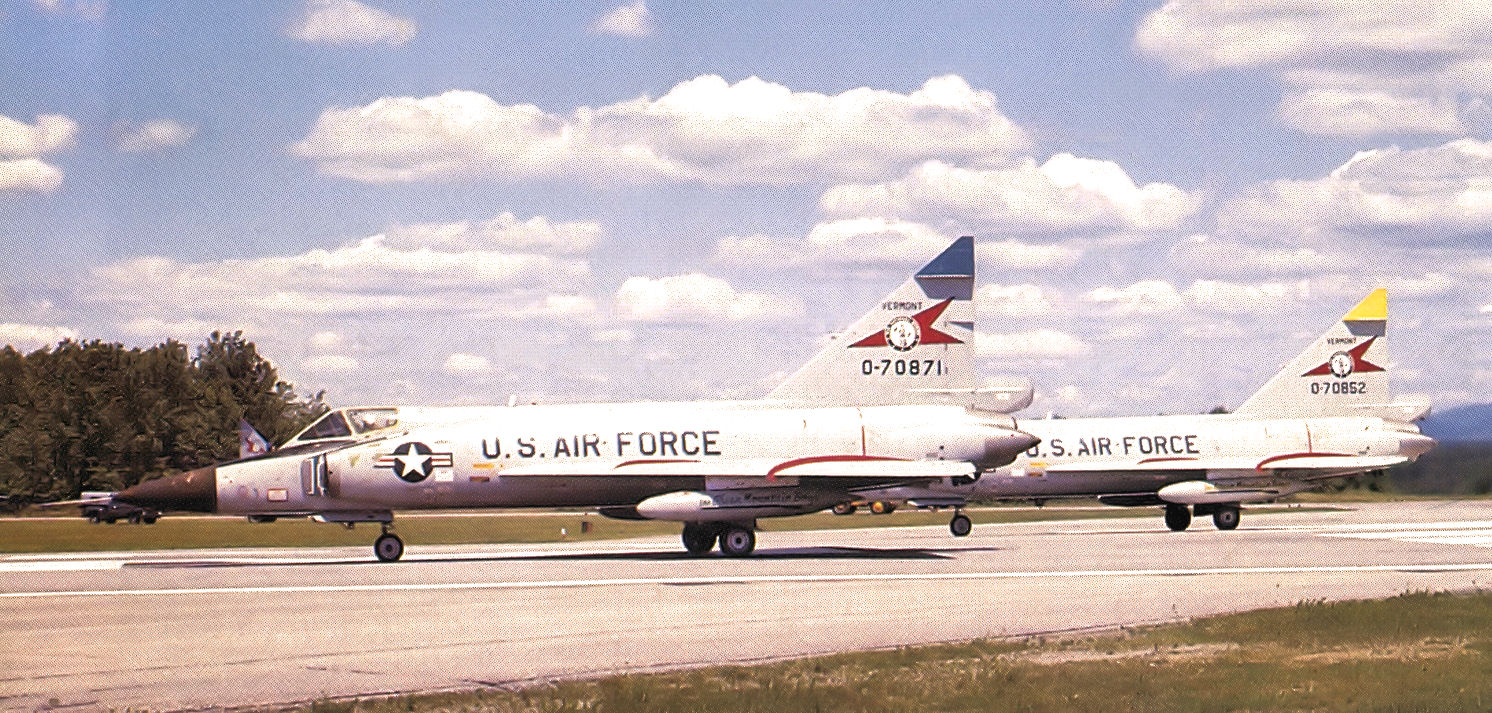
Squadron F-102s on alert in 1970 (Note: Aircraft are identified as Convair F-102A-95-CO Delta Dagger, serial 57-0871 and F-102A-90-CO, serial 57-0852. Note different color fin caps.)

In August 1965, the 134th began to receive supersonic Convair F-102A Delta Dagger interceptors equipped with data link and armed with AIM-4 Falcons. In 1972, the squadron placed third in the William Tell Weapons Meet.

In 1971 the Vermont ANG began to actively recruit women into all open career fields. Maryanne T. Lorenz was the first woman officer and SSgt Karen Wingard left active duty with the Air Force to become the first enlisted woman to join the Green Mountain Boy unit.

=== Radar evaluation mission ===
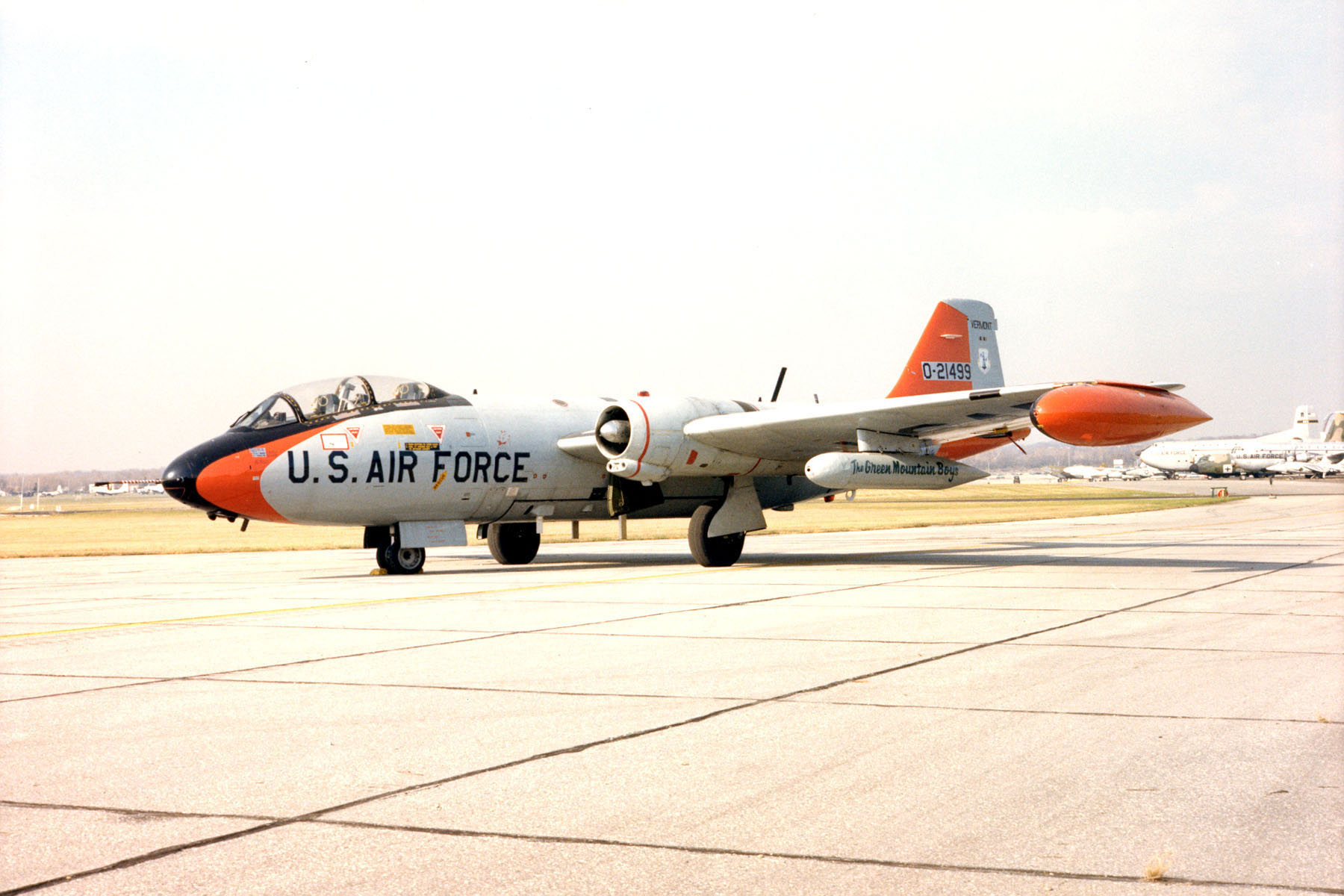
134th Defense Systems Evaluation Squadron EB-57B (Note: Aircraft is Martin EB-57B Canberra, serial 52-1499. This plane is now at the Museum of the Air Force.)

The 134th became the 134th Defense Systems Evaluation Squadron in June 1974, with the unit receiving twenty Martin EB-57 Canberras. These two-seat, twin-engine aircraft were modified former medium bombers equipped with electronic countermeasure equipment and chaff dispensers. The squadron evaluated both air and ground radar systems, not only for NORAD systems, but it provided operational training to air defense units in Iceland, South Korea and Japan. During this mission the squadron earned a flying safety award, Aerospace Defense Command's "A" Award, and an Air Force Outstanding Unit Award. The squadron also had a wartime mission to provide electronic warfare support for combat forces. When Aerospace Defense Command was disestablished in 1979, the squadron's mobilization gaining command became Tactical Air Command (TAC), which assumed the air defense mission of ADC.

=== F-4 Phantom operations ===
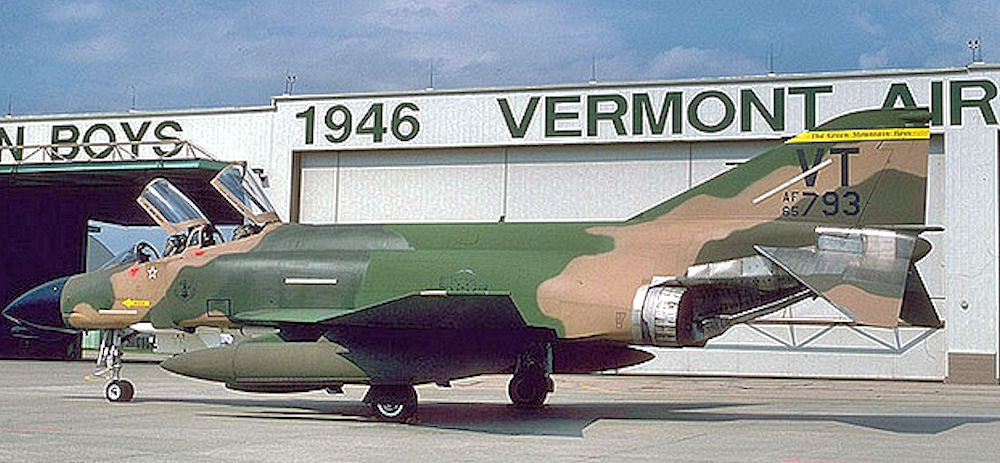
134th Fighter-Interceptor Squadron F-4D Phantom in 1973 (Note: Aircraft is McDonnell F-4D-29-MC Phantom II, serial 65-0793.)

In 1980, the squadron began a transition to the McDonnell F-4D Phantom II, a two-seat, twin-engine fighter, leaving the air defense community for a primary mission of ground attack and close air support and redesignation as the 134th Tactical Fighter Squadron. In June 1981, it conducted a final fly-by with a mass formation of its departing EB-57s. In 1983, it placed fourth in Gunsmoke, a biennial gunnery competition. in May 1983.

=== F-16 Fighting Falcon operations ===
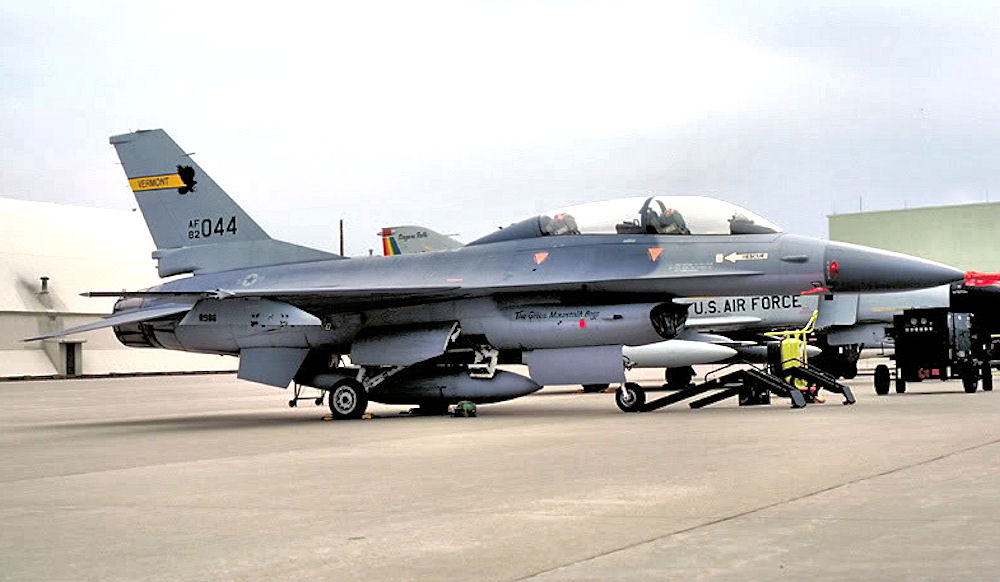
134th Squadron F-16B Air Defense Block 15 Fighting Falcon 82-1044

In the mid eighties the USAF decided to re-equip the Air National Guard units with more modern equipment as part of the Total Force concept. The squadron's F-4D Phantom's were retired and the squadron received its first General Dynamics F-16 Fighting Falcon in April 1986. The first aircraft were the block 15 version, although also some earlier 1970s block 1 and 10 models were flown for a brief time. These aircraft came from regular USAF which transitioned to newer F-16C and F-16D models. The squadron's last F-4 left in April 1986.

While retaining it F-16s, in July 1987 the squadron returned to the air defense mission and once again became the 134th Fighter-Interceptor Squadron. The 134th kept aircraft on 5-minute alert, seven days a week, 24 hours a day. Alert aircraft were under the operational control of the 24th Air Division, and later the Northeast Air Defense Sector Locations of squadron alert aircraft included Burlington; Bangor Air National Guard Base, Maine; Langley Air Force Base, Virginia; and Charleston Air Force Base South Carolina. In 1990 their aircraft were upgraded to the block 15 ADF (Air Defense Fighter) version. With this model the squadron had the second-highest rate of interceptions of Russian bombers after Alaskan Air Command units.

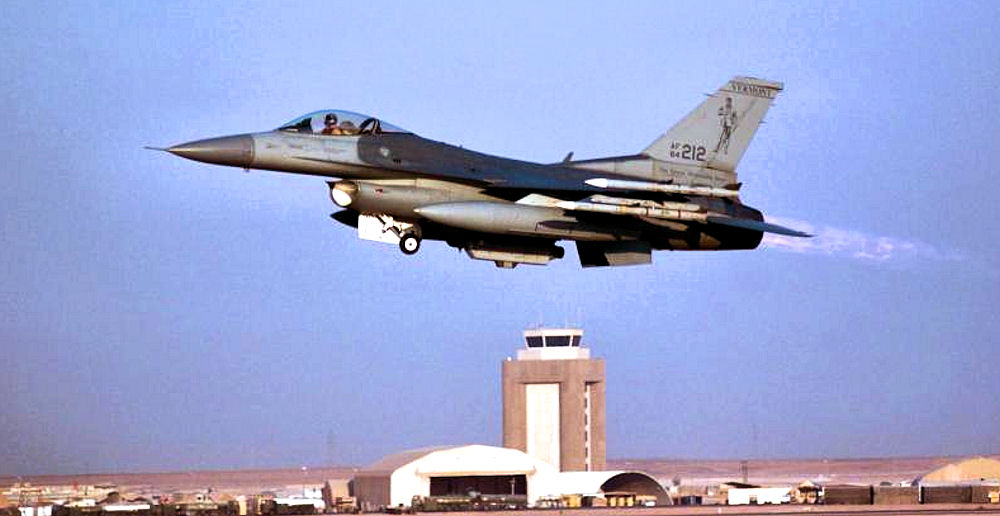
134th Expeditionary Fighter Squadron F-16C taking off from Prince Sultan AB during Operation Southern Watch (Note: Aircraft is Block 25 General Dynamics F-16C Fighting Falcon, serial 84-1212 in 2000.)

In March 1992, with the end of the Cold War, the squadron was redesignated the 134th Fighter Squadron. In June, TAC was inactivated and the squadron was gained by Air Combat Command (ACC).

In 1994, the squadron began to receive the block 25 version of the F-16. It was one of the first ANG units to receive the F-16C and F-16D Fighting Falcon with improved avionics. With the introduction of these aircraft a multi-role mission profile became possible and the squadron was tasked to undertake deployments to the Middle East. Along with the air defense mission, squadron was also tasked seven times to deploy to different locations in Central America to help patrol the skies and intercept aircraft suspected of illegally smuggling drugs. These missions were usually flown far offshore in the middle of the night and required a high degree of proficiency.

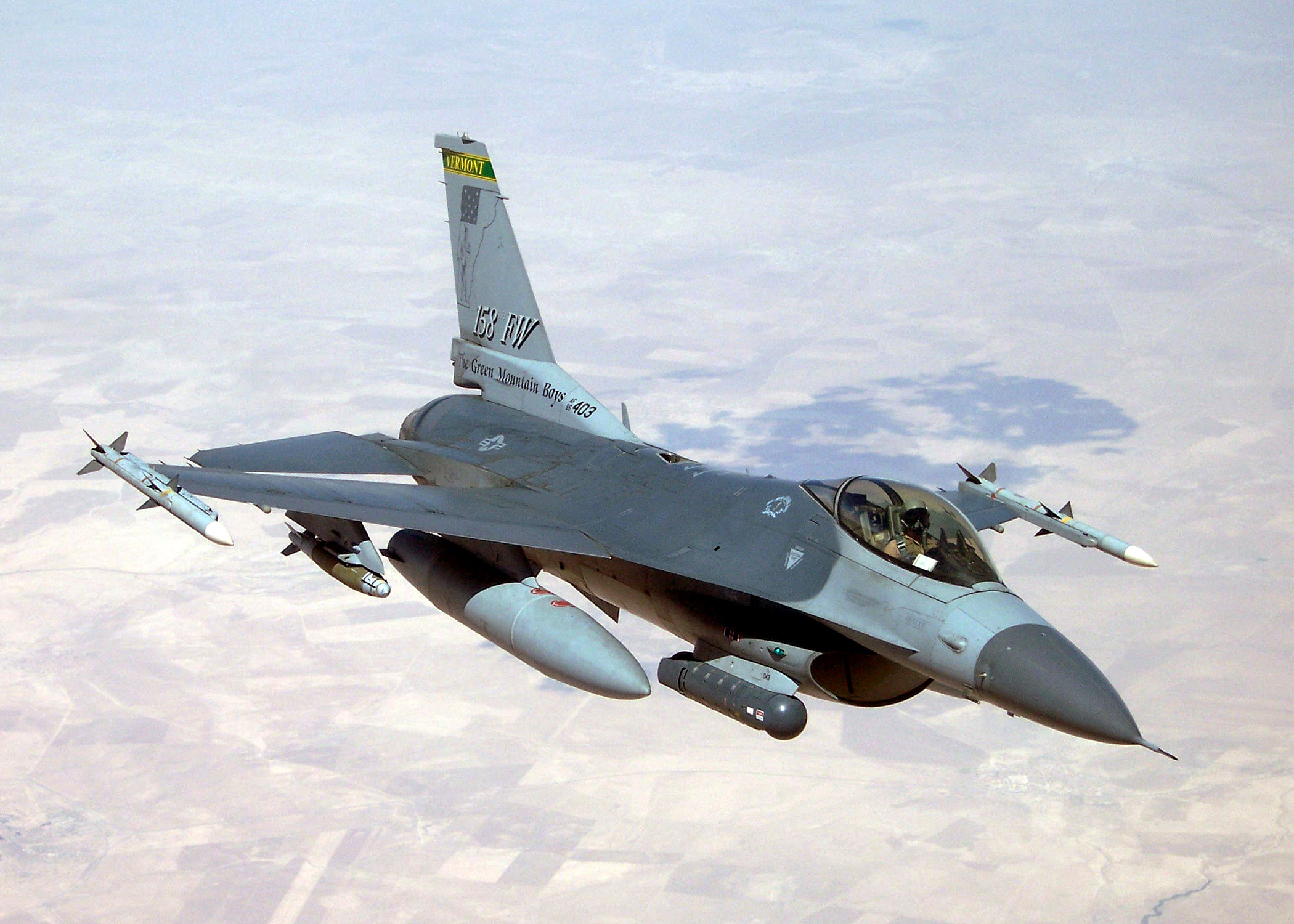
134th Expeditionary Fighter Squadron F-16C flying a close air support mission over Iraq (Note: Aircraft is General Dynamics F-16C Block 25F Fighting Falcon, serial 85-1403, 25 August 2007.)

In October 1995, the 158th Group adopted the Air Force Objective Organization plan and became the 158th Fighter Wing, and the squadron was assigned to the new 158th Operations Group. The squadron returned to the air to ground role in 1998. It was one of five ANG squadrons to be equipped with the Theater Airborne Reconnaissance System. Only five ANG units possess a tactical reconnaissance capacity and were regularly asked to perform this mission.

In October 2000, the elements of the squadron deployed to Prince Sultan Air Base, Saudi Arabia as part of an expeditionary unit including elements of the 111th and 119th Fighter Squadrons as part of Operation Southern Watch. Southern Watch was an operation to enforce the United Nations mandated no-fly zone below the 32nd parallel north in Iraq as part of Air Expeditionary Force 9. This mission was initiated mainly to cover for attacks of Iraqi forces on the Iraqi Shi’ite Muslims.

After the terrorist attacks on 11 September 2001, the 134th began flying Operation Noble Eagle air defense missions. That day, members of the squadron returned from a training mission and received orders while weapons technicians loaded live ordnance on their aircraft. The squadron began daily combat air patrol flights over New York City and other locations in the eastern United States. During the following months, the pilots flew missions for 122 consecutive days before a break. The squadron's response to this emergency earned it an Air Force Outstanding Unit Award. In mid-March 2002, the squadron ended 24/7 operations and took up a more traditional work week assignment. Pilots still flew some patrols, but gradually the operational tempo reached the same levels as before the attacks of September 11th.

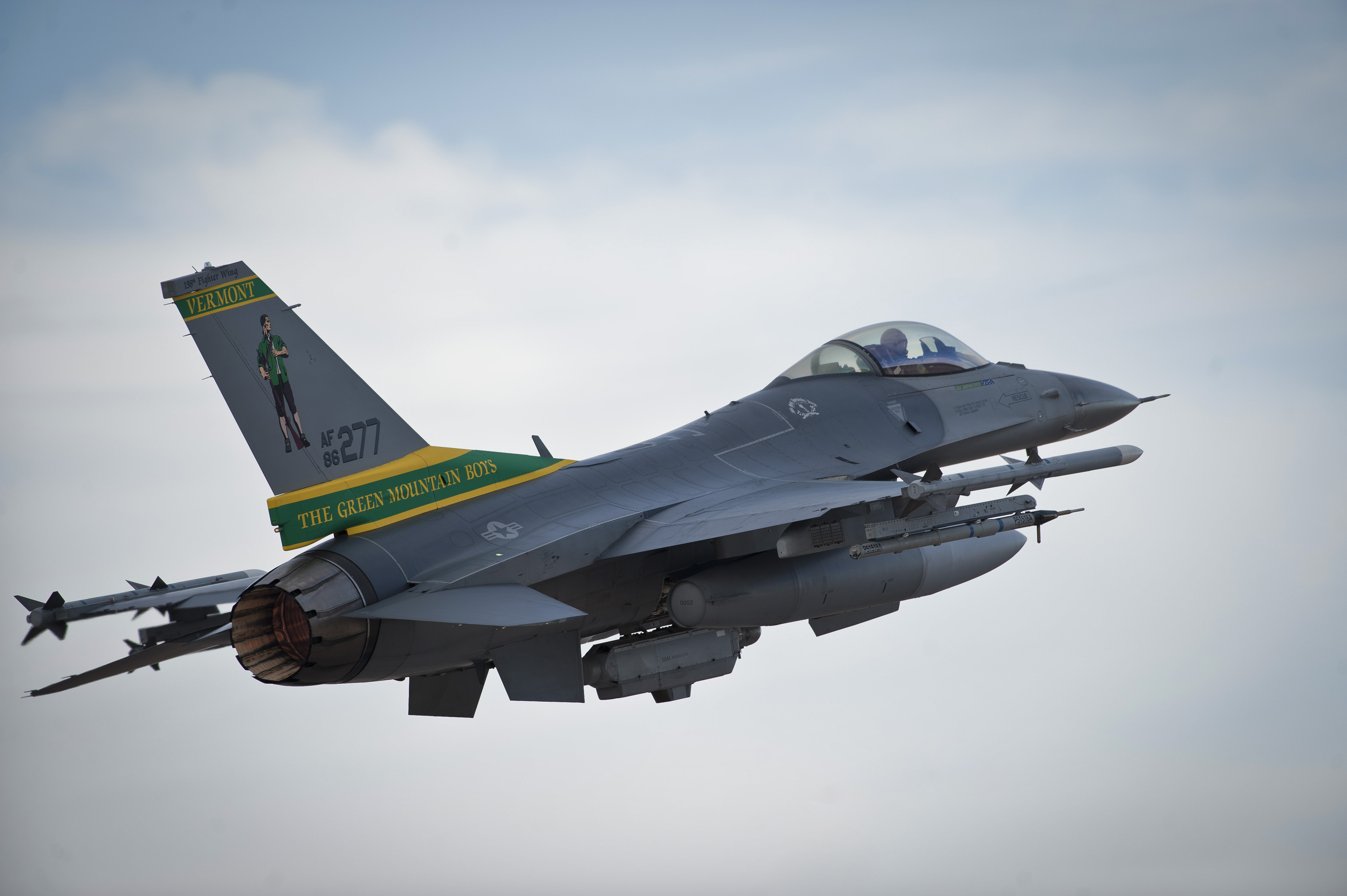
134th F-16C Fighting Falcon during a Red Flag exercise, 2015.

Beginning in May 2005, the 134th began a series of deployments to Balad Air Base, Iraq, being attached to the 332d Expeditionary Fighter Squadron. This was a rotation in the Air Expeditionary Force 9/10 cycle as part of another Rainbow deployment to support Operation Iraqi Freedom along with the 119th and 163d Expeditionary Fighter Squadrons. Another expeditionary deployment was made in February 2006 and a third to Balad was made in September 2007.

As a result of BRAC 2005, on 5 March 2008, the 134th received its first F-16 Block 30 from the Montana ANG 186th Fighter Squadron. This conversion is not only an engine change from the Pratt & Whitney to the General Electric but also to "big inlet" airframes. Its block 25 F-16s were sent to the Minnesota ANG 179th Fighter Squadron; the 412th Test Wing at Edwards Air Force Base, and some went to the aerospace Maintenance and Regeneration Center for retirement in the 'boneyard.' The 134th achieved initial operational capability on the Block 30 in 2009.

In December 2013, the Air Force announced that the Vermont Air National Guard will be the first Air National Guard unit to operate the fifth-generation Lockheed Martin F-35 Lightning II. 20 aircraft were delivered to the unit starting in September 2019. The last four F-16s departed Burlington on 6 April 2019.

=== F-35A Lightning II operations ===
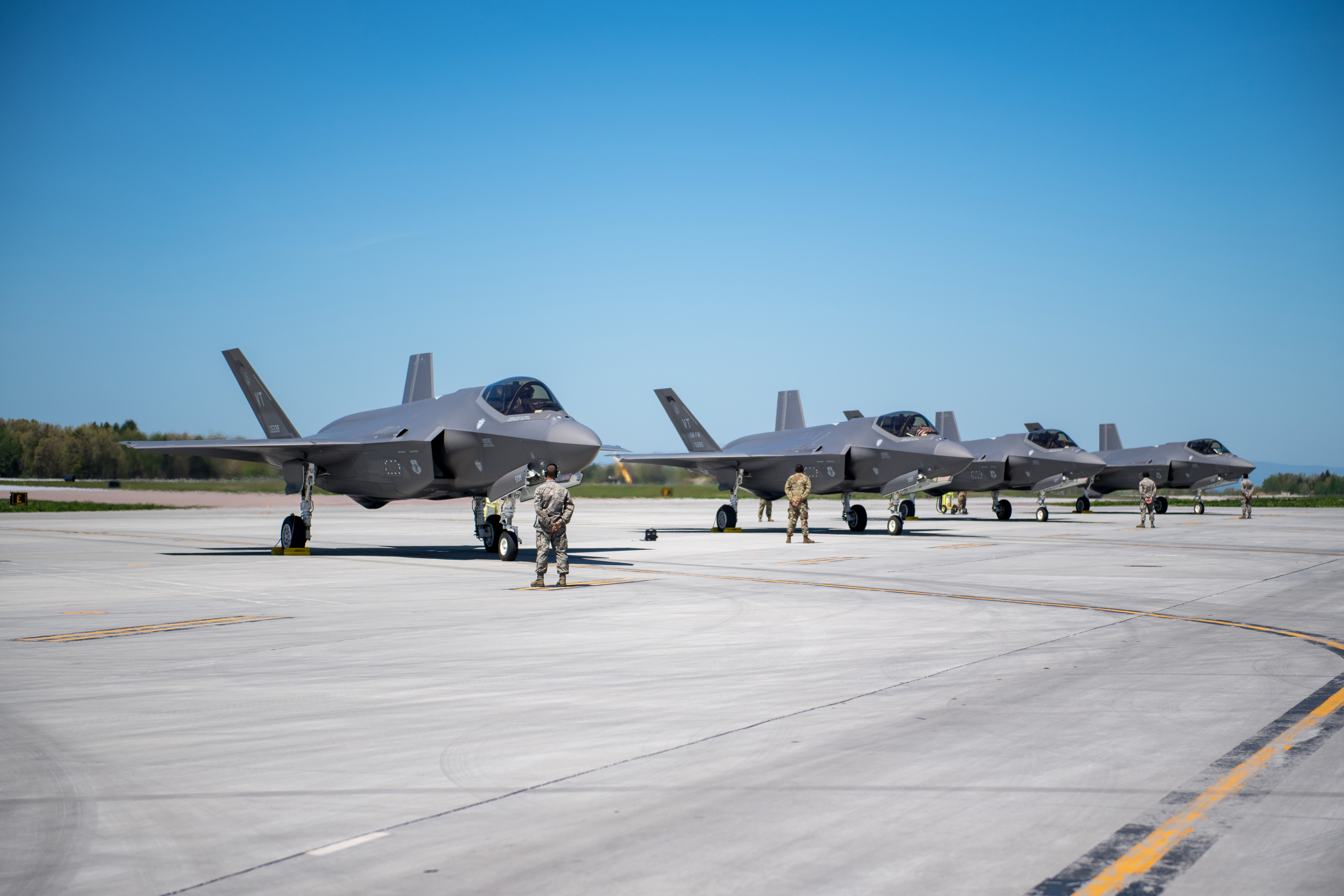
134th F-35A Lightning IIs at Burlington ANGB, 2020.

The last F-16s departed Burlington on 6 April 2019. The first two F-35As were delivered to the 134th on 19 September 2019. Three more F-35As arrived at on 5 December 2019. The last of 20 F-35As to be delivered to the Green Mountain Boys arrived at Burlington in October 2020.

On 2 May 2022, eight 134th F-35As deployed to Spangdahlem Air Base, Germany, to support NATO's Enhanced Air Policing mission prompted by to the 2022 Russian invasion of Ukraine. The Green Mountain Boys returned to Vermont on 3 August 2022 after being replaced by Lockheed Martin F-22 Raptors from the 90th Fighter Squadron.

On 10 December 2025, it was announced that F-35's from the 134th FS would be deployed to the Caribbean to take part in Operation Southern Spear. The fighters are to be staged at the Roosevelt Roads Naval Station located in Puerto Rico. In early January 2026, the 134th took part in Operation Southern Spear and the capture of Nicolas Maduro. Upon completion of their deployment to NAS Roosevelt Roads, the 134th FS was redeployed to Muwaffaq Salti Air Base in Jordan via Lajes Field. In late February 2026, F-35s of the 134th FS began combat sorties against Iran via Operation Epic Fury.

== Lineage ==
- Constituted as the 384th Bombardment Squadron (Light) on 28 January 1942

Activated on 2 March 1942
Redesignated 384th Bombardment Squadron (Dive) on 27 July 1942
Redesignated 530th Fighter-Bomber Squadron on 30 September 1943
Redesignated 530th Fighter Squadron on 30 May 1944
Inactivated on 16 February 1946
Redesignated 134th Fighter Squadron and allotted to the National Guard on 24 May 1946
Extended federal recognition on 14 August 1946
Federalized and ordered to active service on 1 February 1951
Redesignated 134th Fighter-Interceptor Squadron on 11 February 1951
Inactivated, released from active duty and returned to Vermont state control on 1 November 1952
Redesignated 134th Defense Systems Evaluation Squadron on 9 June 1974
Redesignated 134th Tactical Fighter Squadron on 1 January 1982
Redesignated 134th Fighter-Interceptor Squadron on 1 July 1987
Redesignated 134th Fighter Squadron on 15 March 1992

=== Assignments ===
- 311th Bombardment Group (later 311th Fighter-Bomber Group, 311th Fighter Group), 2 March 1942 – 6 January 1946
- Vermont Air National Guard, 14 August 1946
- 67th Fighter Wing, 15 October 1946
- 101st Fighter Group, 4 April 1947
- 101st Fighter-Interceptor Wing, 1 February 1951 (attached to 23d Fighter-Interceptor Wing after 1 April 1951)
- 23d Fighter-Interceptor Wing
- 4711th Defense Wing, 6 February 1952
- 101st Fighter-Interceptor Group, 1 November 1952
- 101st Fighter-Interceptor Wing, 30 April 1954
- 101st Fighter-Interceptor Group, 1 June 1954 (Note: The source describes the group as the "Tactical Fighter Group.")
- 101st Air Defense Wing, 15 April 1956
- 158th Fighter Group (Air Defense) (later 158th Fighter-Interceptor Group, 158th Defense Systems Evaluation Group, 158th Tactical Fighter Group, 158th Fighter-Interceptor Group, 158th Fighter Group), 1 July 1960
- 158th Operations Group, 1 October 1995 – present

=== Stations ===
- Will Rogers Field, Oklahoma, 2 March 1942
- Hunter Field, Georgia, 4 July 1942
- Waycross Army Air Field, Georgia, 22 October 1942 – 18 July 1943
- Nawadih Airfield, India, 14 September 1943
- Dinjan Airfield, India, 18 October 1943 (detachments at Kurmitola Airfield, India, 21 October – November 1943, 28 May – 11 June 1944)
- Kwanghan Airfield, China, 21 October 1944 (detachment at Hsian Airfield, China, 30 October 1944 – 21 February 1945)
- Pungchacheng Airfield, China, 5 May 1945
- Hsian Airfield, China, Aug 1945
- Shanghai, China, 17 October 1945 – 16 February 1946
- Burlington International Airport, Vermont, 14 August 1946 – 1 November 1952
- Burlington International Airport (later Ethan Allen Air Force Base, Burlington Air National Guard Base), Vermont, 1 November 1952 – present

Detachment 1 operated from Bangor International Airport, Maine, 1987 – 1992

==== Vermont Air National Guard deployments ====
- Operation Southern Watch

Operated from: Prince Sultan Air Base, Saudi Arabia, October – 15 November 2000

- Operation Iraqi Freedom

Operated from Balad Air Base, Iraq, May – August 2005
Operated from Balad Air Base, Iraq, February – 20 May 2006
Operated from Balad Air Base, Iraq, September – December 2007

=== Aircraft ===
- Vultee A-31 Vengeance (1942)
- North American A-36A Apache (1942–1944)
- North American P-51C Mustang (1944–1945)
- Douglas C-47 Skytrain (1946–unknown)
- Stinson L-5 Sentinel (1946–unknown)
- North American T-6 Texan (1946–unknown)
- Republic P-47D (later F-47D) Thunderbolt (1947–1950)
- North American F-51D Mustang (1950–1952) (Note: Cornett and Johnson give the F-51D for both the squadron and the 37th Fighter-Interceptor Squadron that replaced it. However, the photograph showing fighters of the squadron clearly show P-51H aircraft.)
- Lockheed T-33 T-Bird (1953–unknown)
- Lockheed F-94 Starfire (1953–1958)
- Northrop F-89D Scorpion (1958–1960)
- Northrop F-89J Scorpion (1960–1965)
- Convair F-102A Delta Dagger (1965–1974)
- Convair TF-102A Delta Dagger (1965–1974)
- Martin EB-57B Canberra (1974–1982)
- McDonnell Douglas F-4D Phantom II (1980–1986)
- General Dynamics F-16A/B Block 15 Fighting Falcon (1986–1990)
- General Dynamics F-16A/B Block 15 ADF Fighting Falcon (1990–1994)
- General Dynamics F-16C/D Block 25 Fighting Falcon (1994–2008)
- General Dynamics F-16C/D Block 30 Fighting Falcon (March 2008–2019)
- Lockheed Martin F-35A Lightning II (2019–present)

=== Awards and campaigns ===
Award streamer	Award	Dates	Notes
	Air Force Meritorious Unit Award	6 March 2013–36 May 2013	134th Expeditionary Fighter Squadron (Note: Expeditionary units are deemed separate units by the Air Force. When a regular or reserve force unit is the major force provider for an expeditionary unit, the expeditionary unit takes its name from the major force provider, which is entitled to any honors earned by the expeditionary unit. AF Instruction 38-101, Manpower and Organization, 29 August 2019, para. 31.4.)
	Air Force Meritorious Unit Award	13 December 2016–13 February 2017	134th Expeditionary Fighter Squadron
	Air Force Outstanding Unit Award	1 April 1999–31 March 2001	134th Fighter Squadron
	Air Force Outstanding Unit Award	11 September 2001	134th Fighter Squadron
	Air Force Outstanding Unit Award	1 July 1983–30 June 1985	134th Fighter Squadron

Campaign Streamer	Campaign	Dates	Notes
	India-Burma	14 September 1943–24 August 1944	383rd Bombardment Squadron (later 530th Fighter-Bomber Squadron, 530th Fighter Squadron)
	China Defensive	24 August 1944–4 May 1945	530th Fighter Squadron)
	China Offensive	5 May 1945–2 September 1945	530th Fighter Squadron)

== See also ==
- General Dynamics F-16 Fighting Falcon operators
- List of F-4 Phantom II operators
- F-89 Scorpion units of the United States Air Force
- F-94 Starfire units of the United States Air Force
- List of United States Air Force defense systems evaluation squadrons
