= 158th Fighter Wing =

Vermont Air National Guard unit

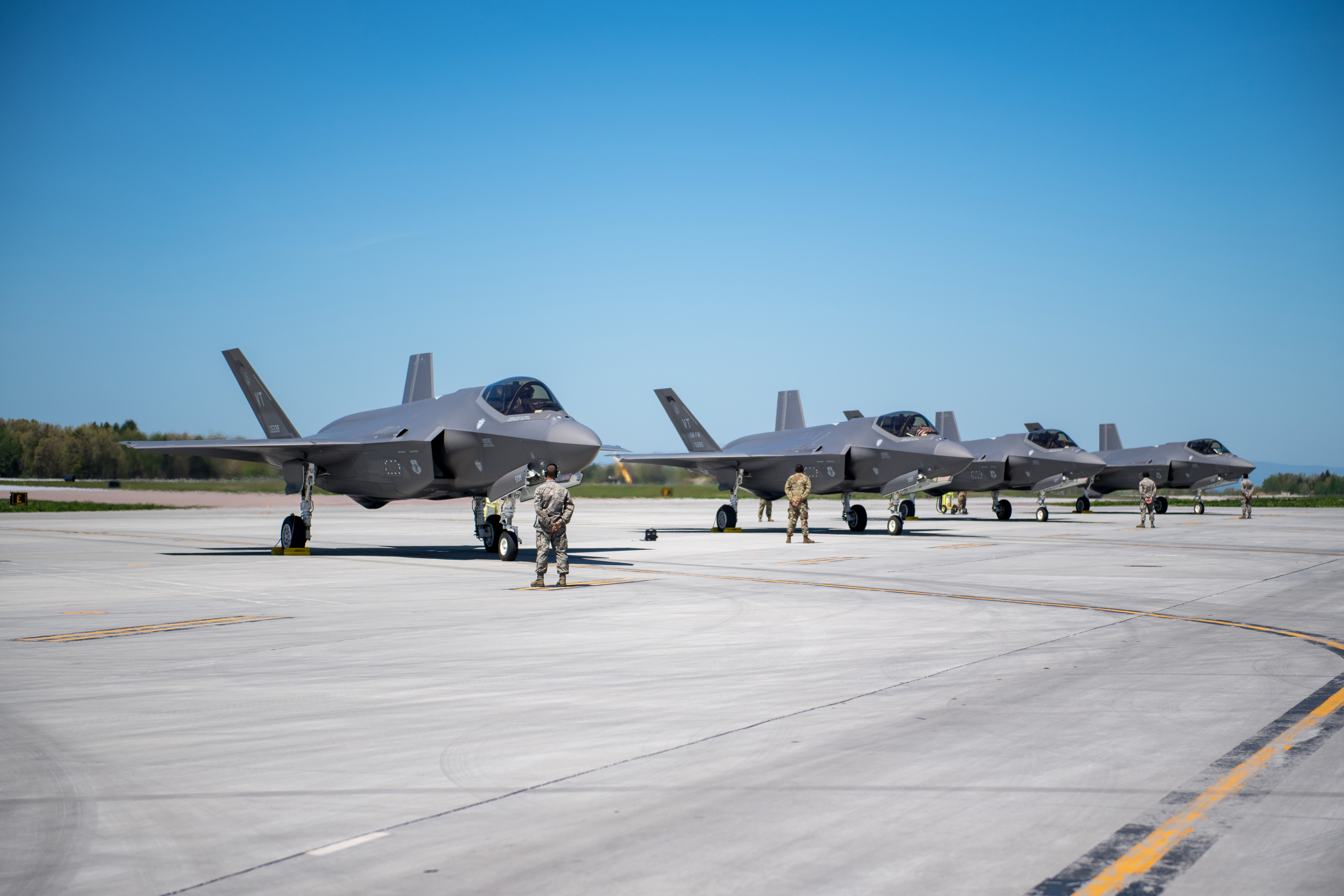
- 158th Fighter Wing F-35A Lightning IIs
- Active: 1956–present
- Country: United States
- Allegiance: Vermont
- Branch: Air National Guard
- Type: Wing
- Role: Fighter/Air Defense
- Part of: Vermont Air National Guard
- Garrison/HQ: Burlington Air National Guard Base, Burlington, Vermont
- Nickname: The Green Mountain Boys
- Tail Code: VT

Commanders
- Current commander: Colonel Michael J. Blair

Insignia
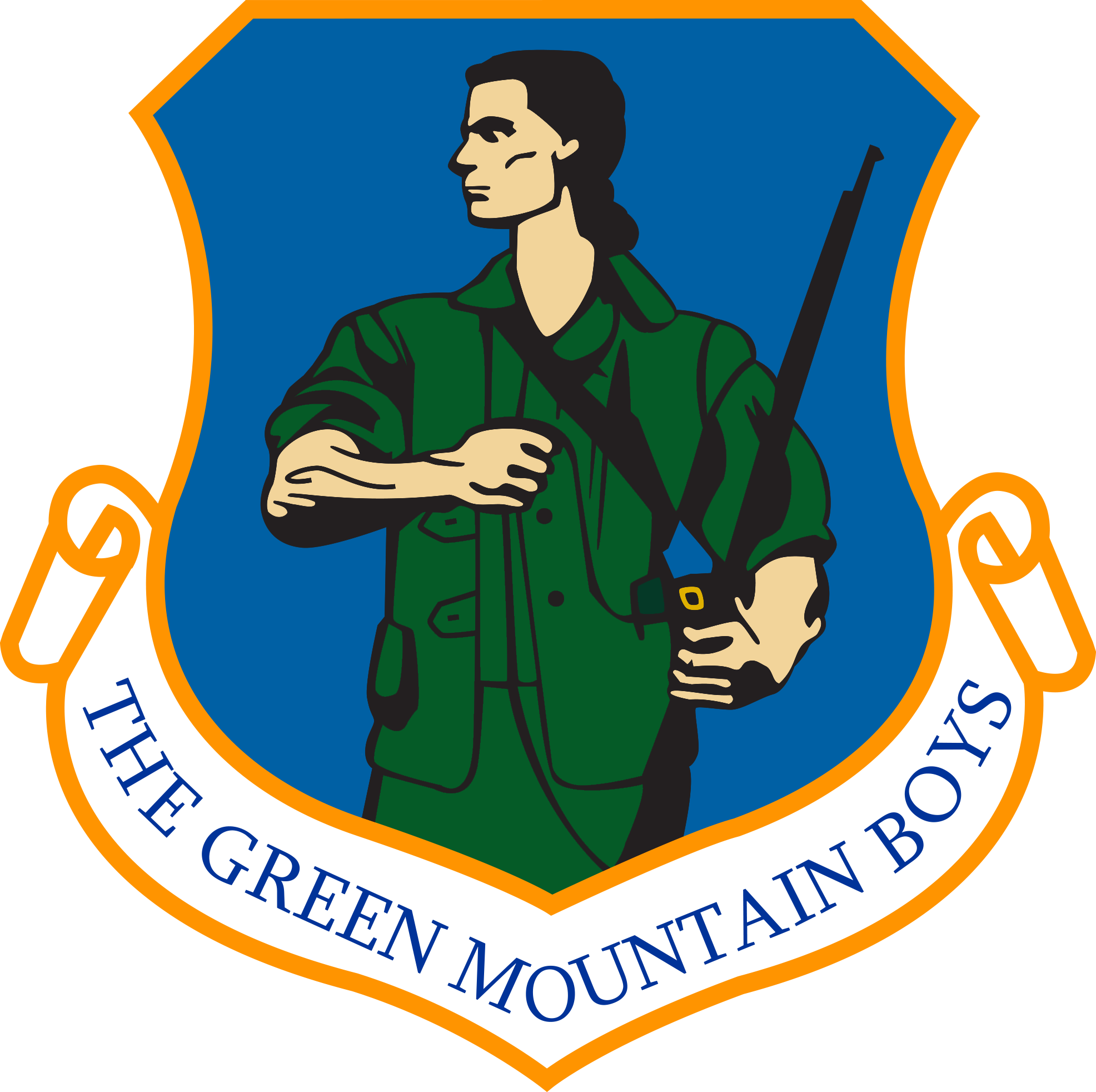
- 158th Fighter Wing emblem

The 158th Fighter Wing (158 FW) is a fighter wing of the Vermont Air National Guard, stationed at Burlington Air National Guard Base, Burlington, Vermont. If activated to federal service, the Wing is under the command of the United States Air Force Air Combat Command. The mission of the 158th Fighter Wing is to act as a Ready Force, equipped with the F-35 to support global and domestic operations.

- Federal government: To provide the United States Air Force with combat ready personnel and equipment for utilization during times of war or national emergency.
- State government: To provide assistance to the State of Vermont for use during local and statewide disasters or emergencies, to protect life, property, and preserve peace, and public safety.

== Units ==
The 158th Fighter Wing consists of the following major units:

- 158th Operations Group
  134th Fighter Squadron
  158th Operations Support Squadron
- 158th Maintenance Group
  158th Maintenance Squadron
  158th Aircraft Maintenance Squadron
- 158th Mission Support Group
  158th Civil Engineer Squadron
  158th Security Forces Squadron
  158th Contracting Squadron
  158th Logistics Readiness Squadron (LRS)
  158th Force Support Squadron
- 158th Medical Group
  158th Medical Support Squadron
  158th Medical Operations Squadron
  158th Aerospace Medicine Squadron
  158th Inpatient Operations Squadron
- 229th Cyberspace Operations Squadron
- 315th Fighter Squadron

== History ==
In 1956 the Maine Air National Guard 101st Fighter-Interceptor Wing was expanded to an Air Defense Wing and reorganized by Air Defense Command. As a result, the Vermont Air National Guard 134th Fighter-Interceptor Squadron was authorized to expand to a group level, and the 158th Fighter Group (Air Defense) was established by the National Guard Bureau; the 134th FIS becoming the group's flying squadron. Other squadrons assigned into the group were the 158th Headquarters, 158th Material Squadron (Maintenance), 158th Combat Support Squadron, and the 158th USAF Dispensary.

=== Air Defense Mission ===
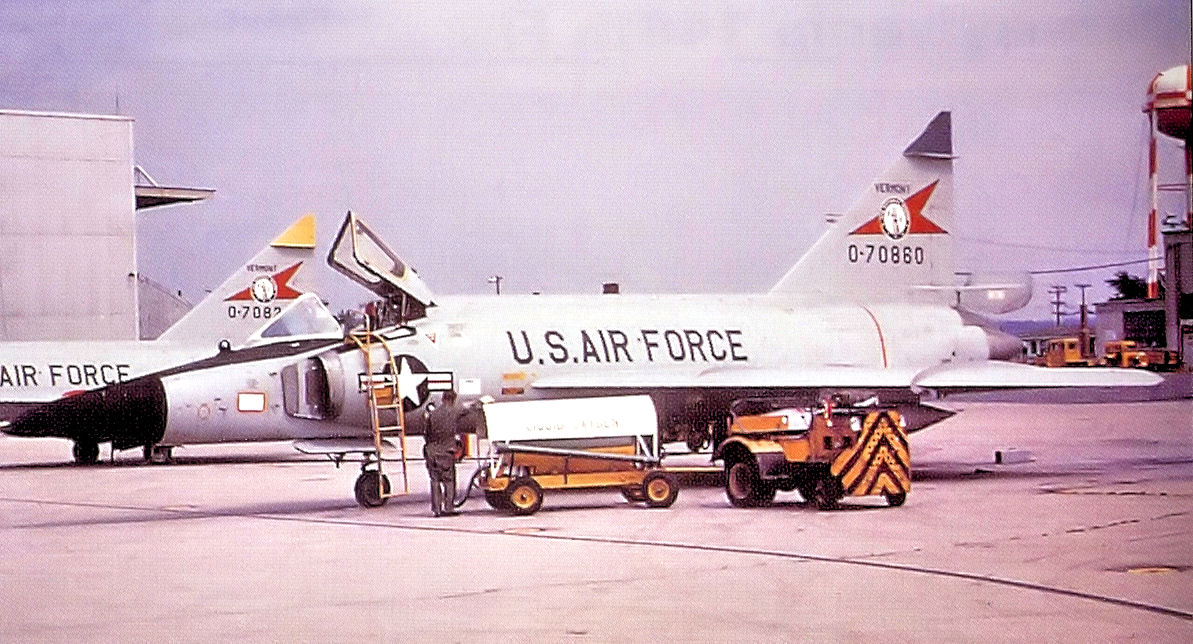
134th Fighter-Interceptor Squadron – Convair F-102A Delta Dagger 57-0880

The mission of the 158th Fighter Group (AD) was the air defense of Vermont. Its 134th FIS was initially equipped with the F-94 Starfire interceptor.

On 25 June 1960, Air Defense Command inactivated the active-duty 14th Fighter Group at Ethan Allen AFB, and the base reverted to full Air National Guard jurisdiction. The 158th Fighter Group (AD) now manned alert hangars 24 hours a day. In the summer of 1960, summer field training was conducted at Otis Air Force Base at Cape Cod, MA, from 18 June to 2 July. When the unit returned to Burlington, the Maintenance and Operations Squadrons immediately moved into the facilities that had been vacated by the Regular Air Force with the closure of Ethan Allen AFB. The aging F-94s were replaced by twin-engine F-89D Scorpion fighters in 1958. Two years later F-89Js replaced the D models. The J model was designed to carry two AIR-2 Genie nuclear-tipped air-to-air missiles under the wings to defend against enemy bomber attack.

The 134th was reorganized as the 158th Fighter Interceptor Group and was placed under the United States Air Defense Command. Lt Col Robert P. Goyette assumed command of the group and Maj. Rolfe L. Chickering took command of the 134th Fighter Interceptor Squadron. The Air Guard now manned alert hangars 24 hours a day, a mission which had previously belonged to the active Air Force.

During the 1950s and early 1960s, better training and equipment, and closer relations with the Air Force greatly improved the readiness of Group. The Vermont Air National Guard received the ADC Operational Readiness award in October 1962, for having the greatest degree of readiness of any F-89 unit in the country. In 1965, the 134th received supersonic F-102A Delta Dagger interceptors, the Air Guard was always one generation of aircraft behind the Air Force during this time.

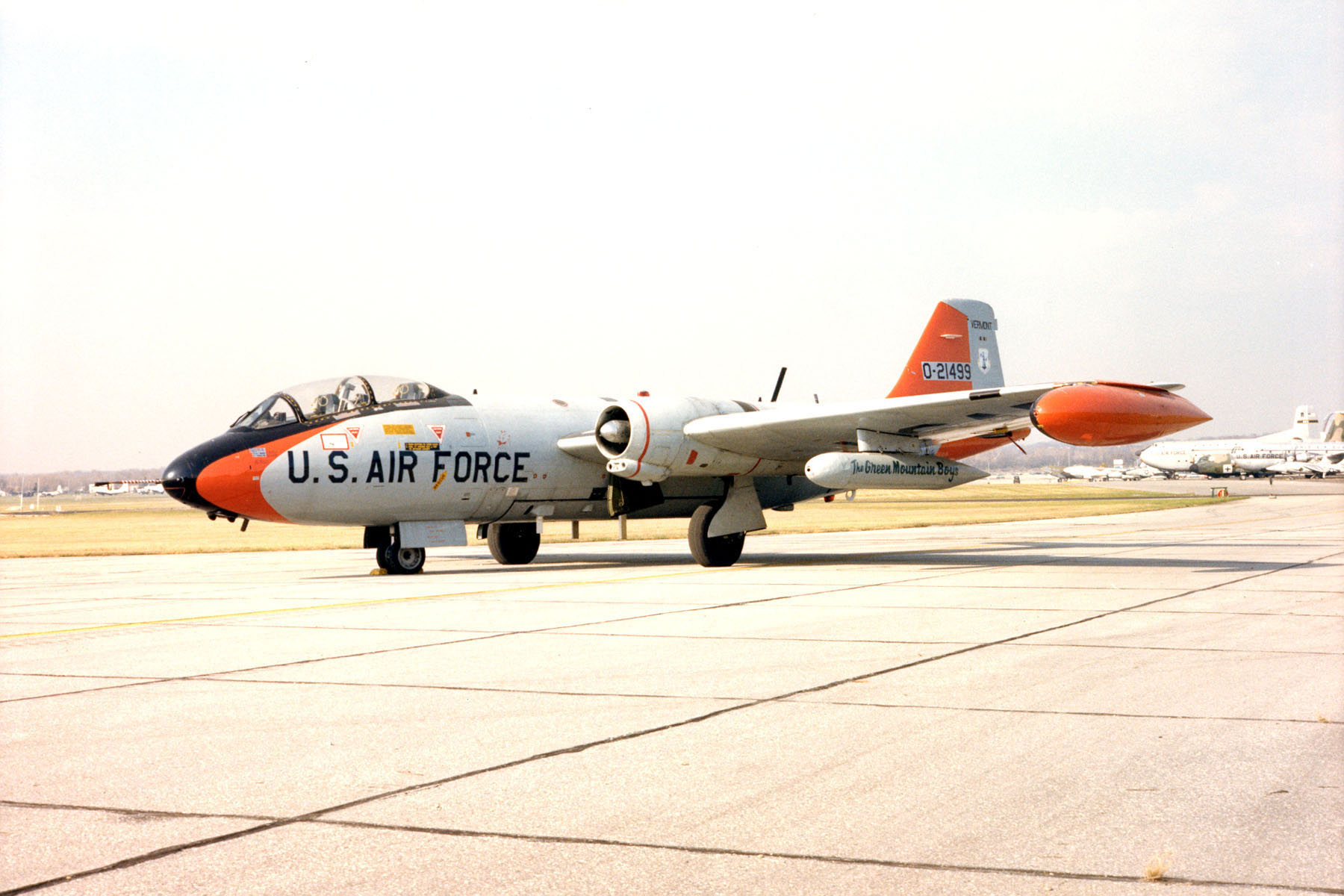
158th Defense Systems Evaluation Group EB-57B 52-1499. Now at the USAF Museum

In 1971 the 158th embarked on an intensive recruiting program that made Vermont one of the top units in the country in total strength. During this period the Vermont ANG began to actively recruit women into all open career fields. Maryanne T. Lorenz was the first woman officer and SSgt Karen Wingard left active duty with the Air Force to become the first enlisted woman to join the Green Mountain Boys unit. She later became First Sergeant of the 158th Mission Support Squadron, received her commission, and was later appointed commander of that squadron.

The 158th Fighter Interceptor Group became the 158th Defense Systems Evaluation Group (158 DSEG) in June 1974, with the unit receiving twenty EB-57 Canberras. These two-seat, twin-engine aircraft were former medium bombers that were re-equipped with electronic counter-measures and chaff emitting equipment. The new mission was to act as the "friendly enemy" to evaluate both air and ground radar systems. This mission took pilots, electronic warfare officers, and maintenance personnel all over the United States, Canada, and as far as Iceland, South Korea, and Japan. The unit provided direct operational training of now-Aerospace Defense Command, U.S. Air Forces in Europe (USAFE) and Pacific Air Forces (PACAF) aircrews in the accomplishment of their mission when their systems were severely degraded as might be expected during an attack by enemy offensive aircraft.

==== Tactical Air Command ====
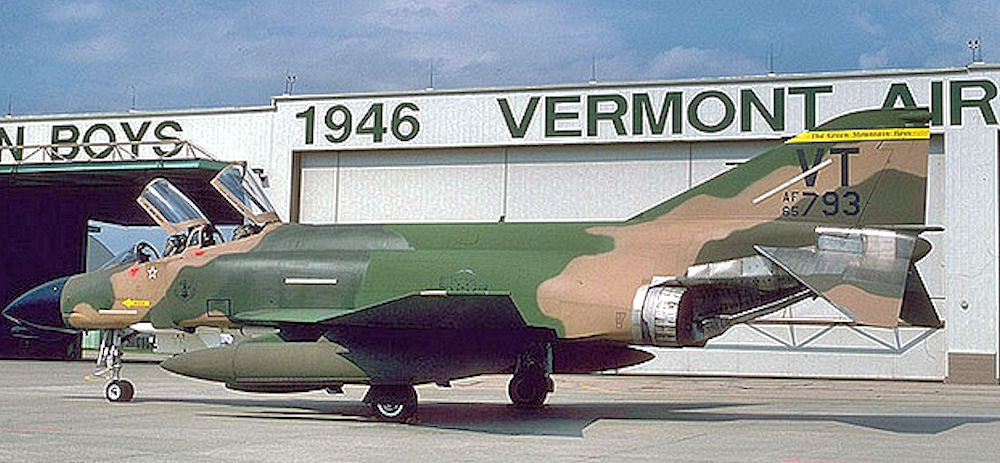
34th Fighter-Interceptor Squadron – McDonnell F-4D-29-MC Phantom 65-0793, 1983

With the disestablishment of Aerospace Defense Command in 1979, the 158th was subsequently transferred to Tactical Air Command (TAC) as a gaining command under Air Defense, Tactical Air Command (ADTAC), which assumed the mission of the former ADC.

In 1980, the 158th began a transition to the F-4D Phantom II, two seat, twin-engine fighter, with the Vermont Air National Guard, leaving the Air Defense community to become part of main line Tactical Air Command with a primary mission of ground attack and close air support.

The 158th Tactical Fighter Group deployed to the Gulfport Combat Readiness Training Center, Mississippi, in January 1983 to prepare for the upcoming Operational Readiness Inspection. This was the unit's first large-scale deployment in 23 years. The last deployment had been for summer camp at Otis AFB, Massachusetts, in 1960.

The 158th Civil Engineering Squadron dedicated its new building on 14 December. Fifty-two members of the CE Squadron deployed to Panama on a humanitarian mission in January 1994. They constructed a six-room masonry block school building and a single story wood frame building to be used as a hospice by the local hospital.

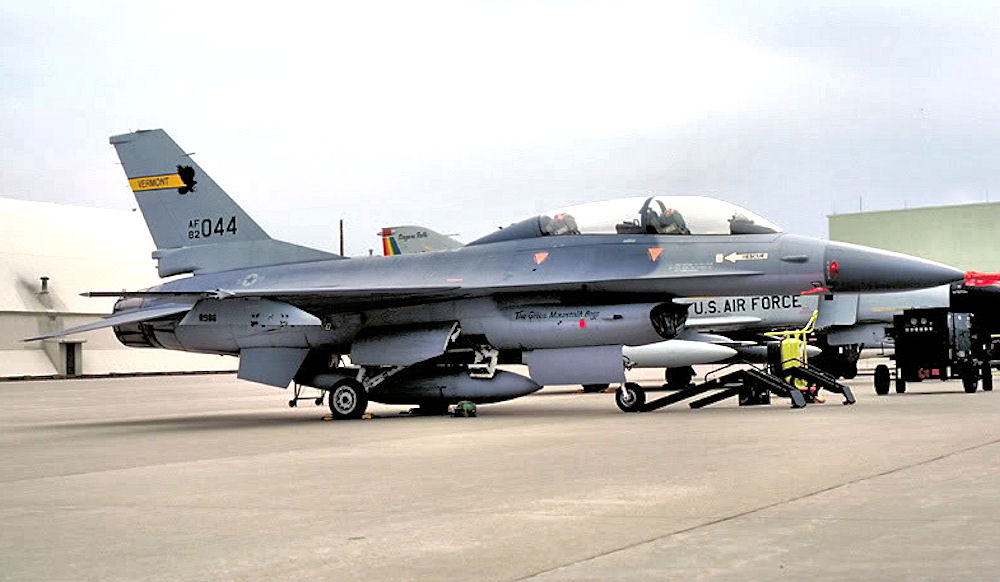
134th FIS F-16B Air Defense Block 15 Fighting Falcon 82-1044

In the mid eighties the USAF decided to re-equip the Air National Guard units with more modern equipment as part of the "Total Force" concept. In the earlier decades the ANG always had to be thankful to receive older USAF jets. With the introduction of the F-16 this changed. The F-4D Phantoms were retired in 1986 and the first F-16 Fighting Falcon models of the 134th FS were of the block 15 version – although also some earlier 1970s block 1 and 10 models were flown for a brief time. These aircraft came from regular USAF squadrons who transitioned to newer F-16C/D models, but still these aircraft, largely 1982 models, were no older than 5 years.

From 1989–1997, the 134th Fighter Squadron's mission was air defense, having aircraft on 5-minute alert, seven days a week, 24 hours a day. Locations of these alert aircraft included Burlington, Maine, Virginia and South Carolina. The location of the Vermont ANG was much more specific in their relation to NORAD that they were tasked with this defense as a primary role. Therefore, the block 15 lacked the Beyond Visual Range capability. However, this changed in the course of 1990 with the upgrade of their aircraft to the block 15 ADF (Air Defense Fighter) version. This meant a serious leap in performance and capability of this squadron in their defensive role. As a result, the Vermont ANG has one of the highest rates of interceptions of Russian bombers that were coming in over the North Pole, except for some Alaskan USAF units.

Many times Vermont F-16's were called upon to fly to a point just short of Iceland and escort Soviet bombers as they flew off the coastline of the United States. The 158th FW has also assisted with aircraft experiencing in-flight malfunctions and hijackings.

==== Air Combat Command ====
In March 1992, with the end of the Cold War, the 158th adopted the Air Force Objective Organization plan, and the unit was re-designated as the 158th Fighter Group. In June, Tactical Air Command was inactivated as part of the Air Force reorganization after the end of the Cold War. It was replaced by Air Combat Command (ACC).

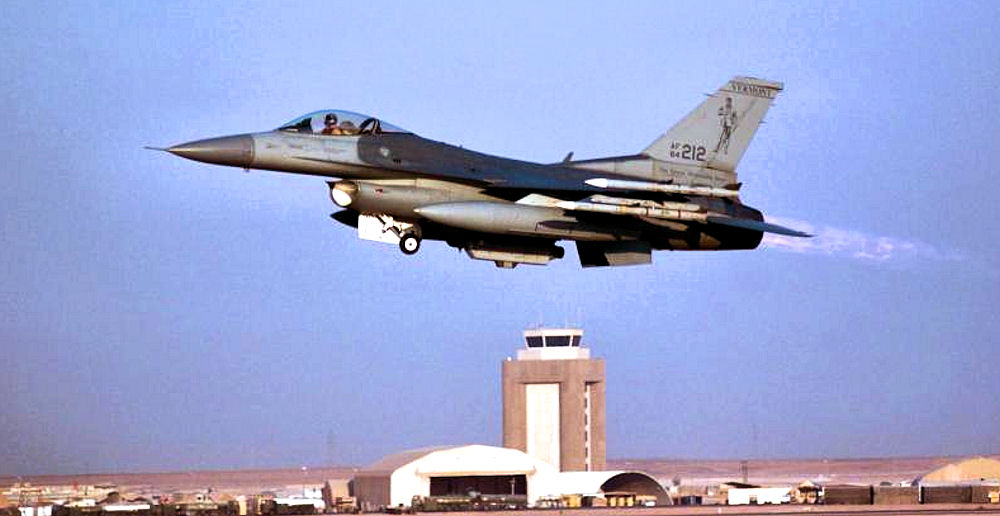
134th Expeditionary Fighter Squadron Block 25 F-16C 84-1212 taking off from Prince Sultan AB, Saudi Arabia, during Operation Southern Watch, 2000

In 1994 the scope of the squadron was again enlarged with the introduction of the block 25 version of the F-16. The 134th FS was one of the first ANG units to receive the F-16C/D Fighting Falcon. At first the mission of the squadron remained relatively the same. But with the introduction of these aircraft a more multi-role mission profile became possible with the squadron being tasked to undertake deployments to the Middle East.

Along with the Air Defense mission, the men and women of "The Green Mountain Boys" have also been tasked seven times to deploy to different locations in Central America to help patrol the skies and intercept aircraft suspected of illegally smuggling drugs. These missions were usually flown far offshore in the middle of the night and required a high degree of proficiency.

In 1995, in accordance with the Air Force "One Base-One Wing" directive, the 158th was changed in status to a Wing, and the 134th Fighter Squadron was assigned to the new 158th Operations Group. In mid-1996, the Air Force, in response to budget cuts, and changing world situations, began experimenting with Air Expeditionary organizations. The Air Expeditionary Force (AEF) concept was developed that would mix Active-Duty, Reserve and Air National Guard elements into a combined force. Instead of entire permanent units deploying as "Provisional" as in the 1991 Gulf War, Expeditionary units are composed of "aviation packages" from several wings, including active-duty Air Force, the Air Force Reserve Command and the Air National Guard, would be married together to carry out the assigned deployment rotation.

In the fall of 1997, the 158th Fighter Wing was evaluated by the Air Combat Command and was tasked to fight a simulated war from 2 locations, a very challenging undertaking. The 158th Wing deployed 225 personnel and 10 F-16s to Canada while the rest of the Wing remained in Burlington for the comprehensive 5-day evaluation. The men and women of "The Green Mountain Boys" received the first rating of "Outstanding" (the highest possible score) ever earned by an Air Defense Unit.

In 1998 the squadron was one of five ANG squadrons to be equipped with the Theater Airborne Reconnaissance System (TARS). This way the squadrons mission became somewhat specific in the USAF, since only these five ANG units possess a tactical reconnaissance capacity. They are therefore regularly asked to perform this mission for the entire organization.

In October 2000, the 134th Expeditionary Fighter Squadron was formed and deployed to Prince Sultan Air Base, Saudi Arabia as part of a "Rainbow" package composed of the 111th and 177th Fighter Squadron. Operation Southern Watch was an operation which was responsible for enforcing the no-fly zone below the 32nd parallel north in Iraq as part of Air Expeditionary Force 9. This mission was initiated mainly to cover for attacks of Iraqi forces on the Iraqi Shi’ite Muslims.

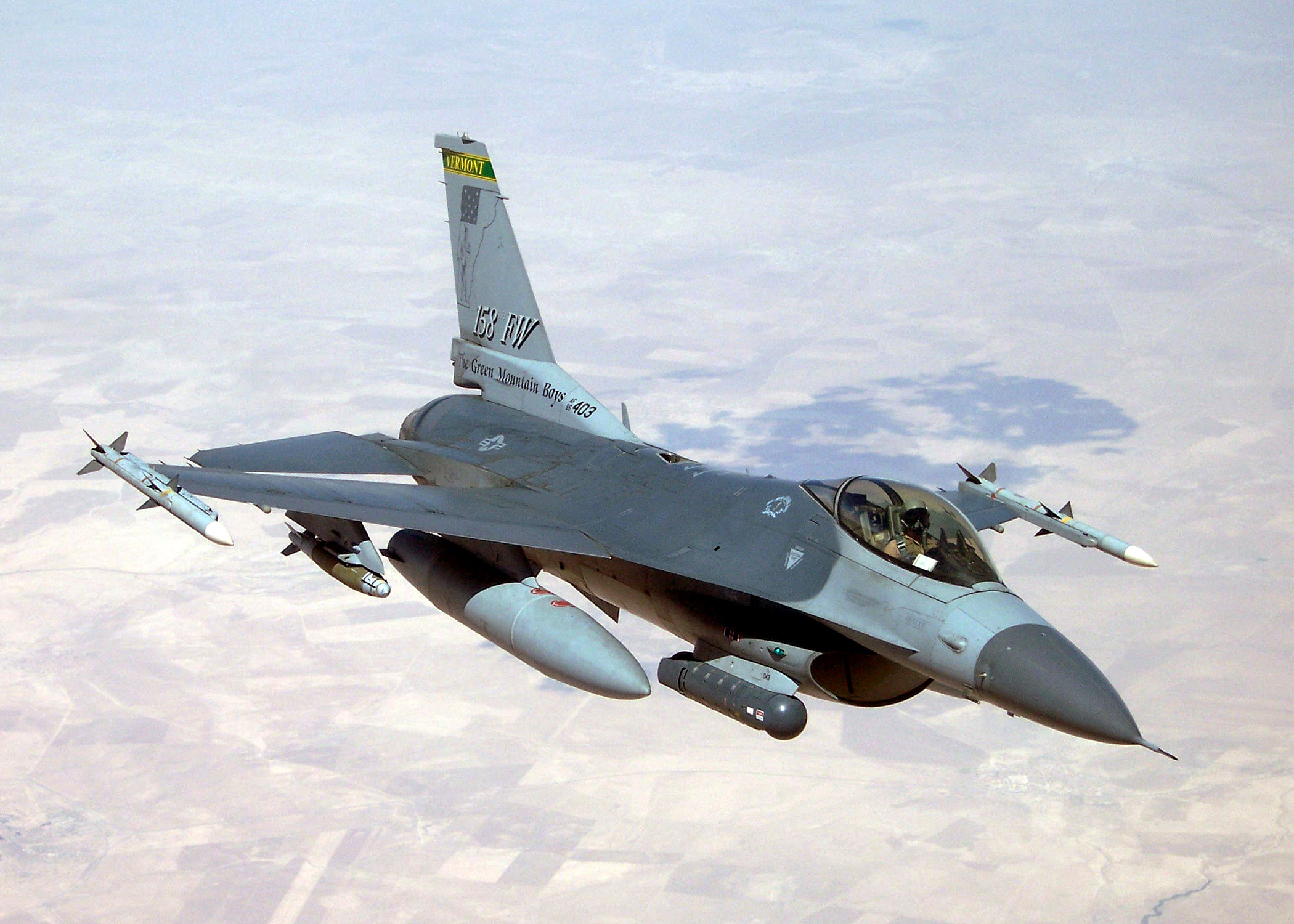
134th Expeditionary Fighter Squadron F-16C Block 25F Fighting Falcon 85-1403 flying a Close Air Support mission over Iraq, 25 August 2007

After the terrorist attacks on 11 September 2001, the 134th began flying Operation Noble Eagle air defense missions over major cities in the northeast.

Beginning in May 2005, the 134th began a series of deployments to Balad Air Base, Iraq, being attached to the 332d Expeditionary Fighter Squadron. This was a rotation in the Air Expeditionary Force 9/10 cycle as part of another Rainbow deployment to support Operation Iraqi Freedom (OIF) along with the 119th and 163d Expeditionary Fighter Squadrons. Another OIF Expeditionary deployment was made in February 2006 and a third to Balad AB was made in September 2007.

As a result of BRAC 2005, on 5 March 2008 – still in 186th FS markings – the 134th FS received its first F-16 block 30 (#87-0332) as the Montana ANG 186th Fighter Squadron converted to the F-15 Eagle. This conversion is not only an engine change from the Pratt & Whitney to the General Electric but also to the big inlet viper. Before the end of 2008 the 134th FS had completed its conversion to the block 30. The block 25s were sent to the Minnesota ANG 179th Fighter Squadron; the 412th Test Wing at Edwards AFB, and some went to AMARC for retirement in the 'boneyard.' The 134th achieved initial operational capability (IOC) on the block 30 in 2009 with the squadron being ready for combat.

In 2019, the 158th Fighter Wing converted to the F-35A Lightning II, becoming the first Air National Guard fighter wing to base the F-35A aircraft.

On 10 December 2025, it was announced that F-35's from the 158th Fighter Wing would be deployed to the Caribbean to take part in Operation Southern Spear. The fighters are to be staged at the Roosevelt Roads Naval Station located in Puerto Rico. The wing was still mobilized in March 2026 after supporting Operation Absolute Resolve when they were sent to the Middle East in support of Operation Epic Fury.

=== Lineage ===
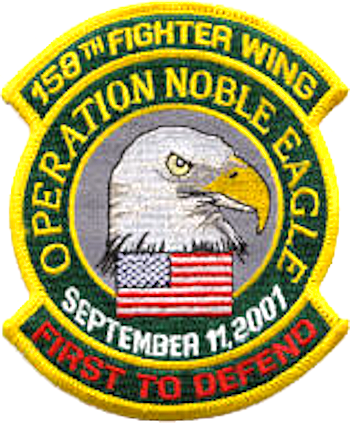
2001 Operation Noble Eagle patch

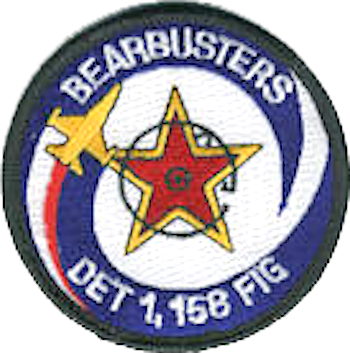
158th Fighter Group (Det. 1) emblem

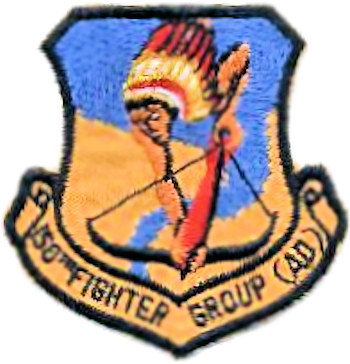
158th Fighter Group (Air Defense) emblem, 1956

- Established as 158th Fighter Group (Air Defense), and allotted to Vermont ANG in 1956

Received federal recognition and activated on 15 April 1956
Re-designated: 158th Fighter-Interceptor Group, 1 July 1960
Re-designated: 158th Defense Systems Evaluation Group, 9 June 1974
Re-designated: 158th Tactical Fighter Group, 1 January 1982
Re-designated: 158th Fighter-Interceptor Group, 1 July 1987
Re-designated: 158th Fighter Group, 15 March 1992
Status changed from Group to Wing, 11 October 1995
Re-designated: 158th Fighter Wing, 11 October 1995–present

=== Assignments ===
- 101st Air Defense Wing, 15 April 1956
- Vermont Air National Guard, 1 July 1960

Gained by: Bangor Air Defense Sector, Air Defense Command
Gained by: 35th Air Division, Air Defense Command, 1 April 1966
Gained by: 35th Air Division, Aerospace Defense Command, 15 January 1968
Gained by: 21st Air Division, Aerospace Defense Command, 19 November 1969
Gained by: Air Defense, Tactical Air Command, 1 December 1979
Gained by: Tactical Air Command, 1 January 1982
Gained by: Air Combat Command, 1 June 1992–present

=== Components ===
- 158th Operations Group, 11 October 1995 – present
- 134th Fighter-Interceptor (later Defense Systems Evaluation, Tactical Fighter, Fighter) Squadron, 15 April 1956 – present

=== Stations ===
- Ethan Allen Air Force Base, Burlington, Vermont, 15 April 1956
- Burlington International Airport, Burlington, Vermont, 1 July 1960

Detachment 1 operated from: Bangor International Airport, Maine, 1987–1992
Designated: Burlington Air National Guard Base, 1991 – present

=== Aircraft ===
- F-94A/B Starfire, 1952–1958
- F-89D Scorpion, 1958–1965
- F/TF-102A Delta Dagger, 1965–1974
- EB-57B/E Canberra, 1974–1982
- F-4D Phantom II, 1982–1986
- Block 15 F-16A/B Fighting Falcon, 1986–1990
- Block 15 ADF F-16A/B Fighting Falcon, 1990–1994
- Block 25 F-16C/D Fighting Falcon, 1994–2008
- Block 30 F-16C/D Fighting Falcon, 2008–2019
- F-35A Lightning II, 2019–present

=== Decorations ===
- Air Force Outstanding Unit Award
