= Vermont Wing Civil Air Patrol =

Vermont wing of the USAF civilian auxiliary

- Vermont Wing of Civil Air Patrol

Associated branches
- United States Air Force

Command staff
- Commander: Col. Brian Benedict
- Deputy Commander: Maj. Joe Bosley
- Chief of Staff: Maj. Alan Colvin

Current statistics
- Website: vtwg.cap.gov
- Statistics as of July 31, 2025

The Vermont Wing of the Civil Air Patrol (CAP) is the highest echelon of Civil Air Patrol in the state of Vermont. Vermont Wing headquarters are located at 355 Vally Road South Burlington, Vermont. The Vermont Wing consists of over 150 cadet and adult members at five locations across the state of Vermont.

== Mission ==
The Vermont Wing executes the three missions of the Civil Air Patrol: providing emergency services; offering cadet programs for youth; and providing aerospace education for Civil Air Patrol members and the public.

=== Emergency services ===
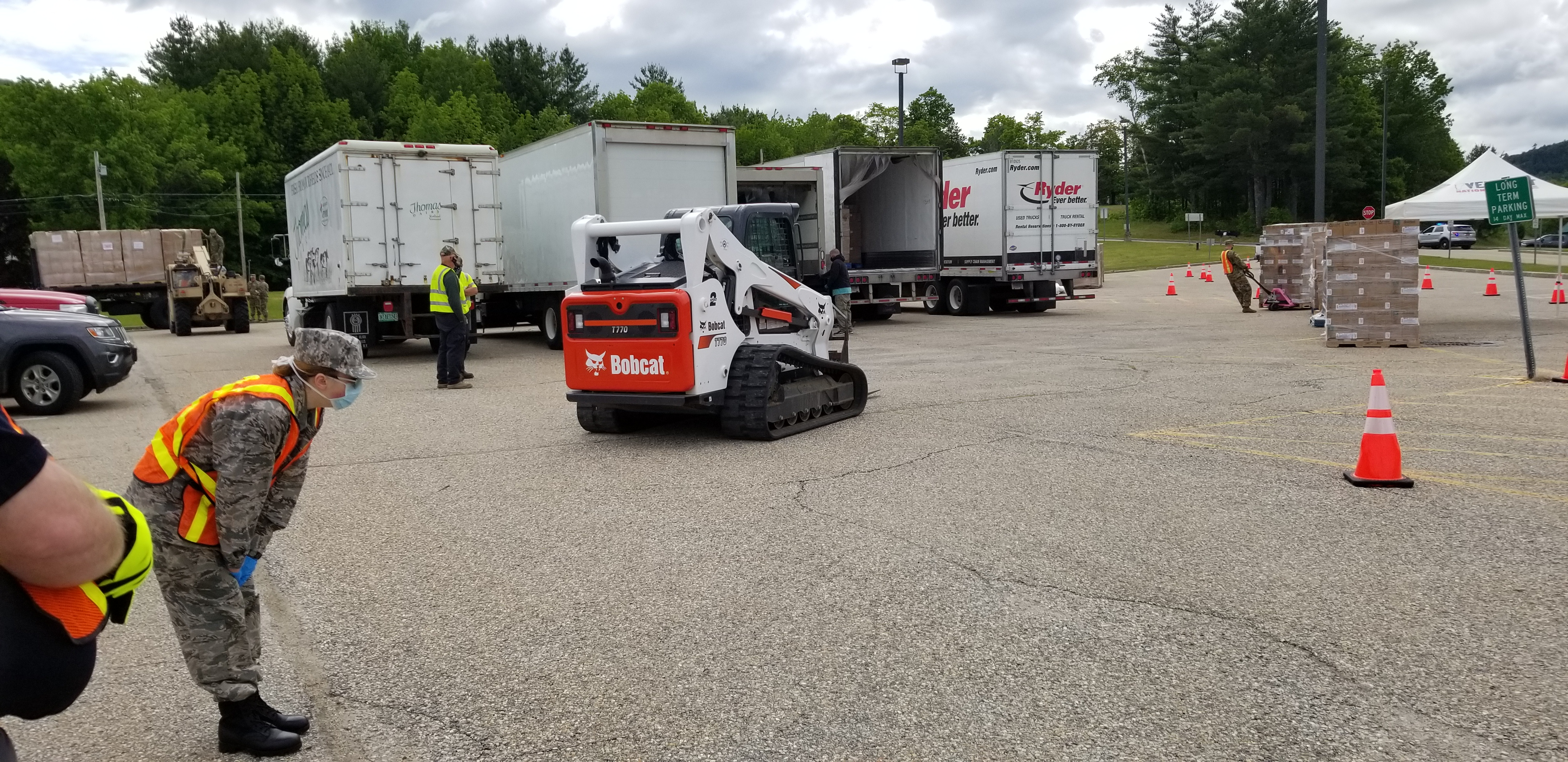
Civil Air Patrol airman (foreground) assists other agencies at a COVID-19 food point of distribution

The Civil Air Patrol provides emergency services, which includes performing search and rescue and disaster relief missions; assisting in humanitarian aid assignments; and providing Air Force support through conducting light transport, communications support, and low-altitude route surveys. The Civil Air Patrol offers support to counter-drug missions.

=== Cadet programs ===
The Civil Air Patrol runs cadet programs for youth aged 12 to 21, which cover materials such as aerospace education, leadership training, physical fitness and moral leadership.

=== Aerospace education ===
The Civil Air Patrol offers aerospace education for Civil Air Patrol members and the general public. The education is provided through the training offered to the cadets of CAP, and also through teaching workshops for youth throughout the nation through schools and public aviation events.

== Organization ==
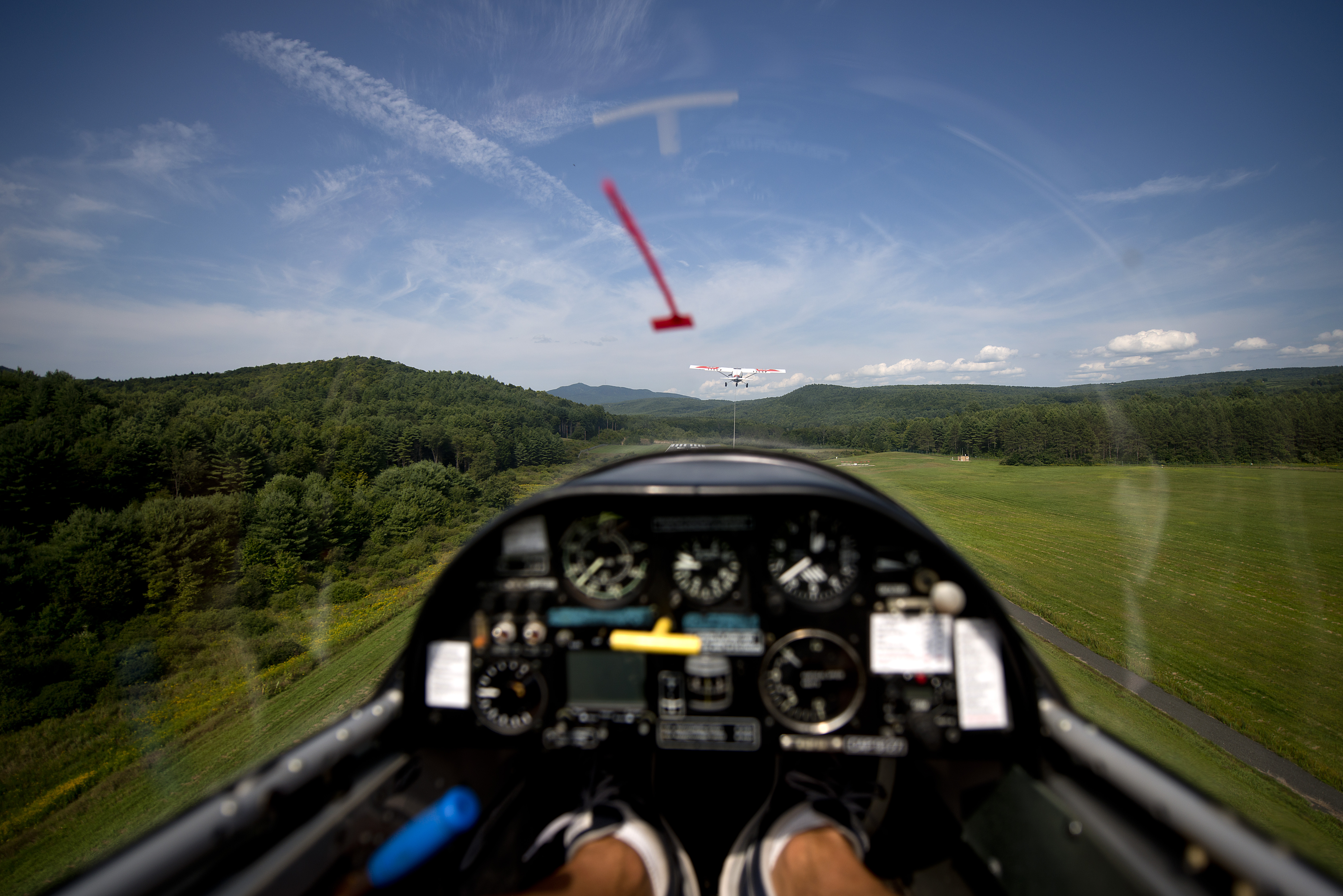
A Civil Air Patrol Maule MT-7 tows an L-23 Super Blanik glider to an area above Springfield, Vermont.

Squadrons of the Vermont Wing
Designation	Squadron Name	Location
VT007	Catamount Composite Squadron	Springfield
VT009	Rutland Composite Squadron	Clarendon
VT014	Champlain Composite Squadron	South Burlington
VT033	Capital Composite Squadron	Barre
VT076	Bennington Composite Squadron	Bennington

== See also ==
- Vermont Air National Guard
- Vermont State Guard
