= Vermont State Guard =

- Vermont State Guard patch
- Active: 1982 – present
- Country: United States
- Allegiance: Vermont
- Type: State Guard
- Role: Military reserve force
- Size: approx. 50
- Part of: Vermont Military Department, Vermont National Guard
- Garrison/HQ: Camp Johnson – Colchester, Vermont
- Nicknames: VSG, State Guard
- Motto: "Ready to Serve"
- Colors: Green and Gold
- Website: https://recruitervsg.wixsite.com/vermontstateguard

Commanders
- Civilian Leadership: Governor Phil Scott
- State military leadership: Major General Gregory C. Knight; Vermont Adjutant General; Major General (VSG) Kenneth Stratton; Commander VSG (since August 2018)

The Vermont State Guard (VSG) is the all-volunteer Military State Support Force of the state of Vermont. The Vermont State Guard serves parallel to the Vermont National Guard, acting as a reserve force for the State of Vermont Military Department. The Vermont State Guard accepts all people even those who were medically disqualified to join the national guard and are composed of individuals living as civilians when not activated, but the force can be activated in the event of a natural disaster to serve as a force multiplier for the National Guard plus Force Protection, and is assigned to fulfill the state mission of the National Guard when the National Guard is deployed.

Unlike the National Guard, the State Guard cannot be federalized or deployed outside the country. Rather, the VSG can only be called up by the governor, and cannot be deployed outside the state without the governor's permission. The Vermont State Guard is authorized under Title 32, Section 109 of the United States Code and Title 20, Part 3, Chapter 61, of the Vermont State Statutes and was activated via Executive Order Number 67.

== History ==
The Vermont State Guard traces its roots in the American colonial times with local Vermont militias such as the Green Mountain Boys. During the American Revolution, the Green Mountain Boys took part in the campaign against British forces under General John Burgoyne, and assisted in the capture of Fort Ticonderoga.

During the American Civil War, the Vermont Militia was expanded to handle home guard duties while units of the United States Volunteers were organized and deployed out of state to take part in the conflict's battles. Notable members included Carroll S. Page and John Calvin Coolidge Sr., father of Calvin Coolidge.

During World War I, the Vermont State Guard again assumed home guard duties while units of the National Guard were performing federal service outside Vermont. Herbert Thomas Johnson, a veteran of the National Guard and member of the Vermont State Guard, became Vermont's adjutant general in 1917 and continued to serve until 1941.

During World War II, Vermont's first modern state defense force, set aside as a state organization not eligible for federal service, was established. During World War II, the Vermont State Guard raised a force of 1,278 men and 131 officers to stand in for the National Guard, and, as summarized by Vermont Governor William H. Wills, guarded vital structures such as bridges, electric plants and dams, under the worst of conditions, sub zero weather and inadequate clothing and equipment. In addition, they were on call during their World War II service for local emergencies such as forest fires, searching for lost persons, and searching for airplane crashes.

The modern incarnation of the Vermont State Guard was signed into law by Governor Richard A. Snelling on April 26, 1982.

== Membership ==
Membership in the Vermont State Guard is open to all citizens of Vermont, both with and without military experience. Prospective members must pass a background check conducted by the Vermont National Guard. The Vermont State Guard (VSG) is continually recruiting new members, as the VSG role has increased and become more critical as natural disasters continue to unfold and intensify. The Vermont State Guard is open to membership for everyone from ages 17 to 80 years old. People who are disqualified from federal service due to age or medical reasons are encouraged to apply, along with veterans if they have an honorable discharge.

There are 3 requirements for joining the Vermont State Guard.

1. You must be at least 17 years of age
2. You must have no major arrests/ felonies on your record
3. You must be a legal resident of the State of Vermont to be eligible for membership.

== Training and duties ==
The Vermont State Guard can be called up by the Governor for any peacetime mission of the National Guard, such as acting as responders to natural disasters, assisting in military funerals as well as assisting with ceremonial duties. The Vermont State Guard identifies the chief areas of focus of training and service as:

- Safe traffic and pedestrian control on non-public property.
- On base security.
- Emergency radio communications.
- Legal support (attorneys and paralegals).
- Support of the military community including their families. communications
- Chaplain services
- Operational support to Vermont Army and Air National Guard
- Assists with flooding or any other natural disaster within the State of Vermont.
- Provides emergency medical training to members

. Members of the Vermont State Guard (VSG) Meet once a month and have an annual training day once a year. Members of The Vermont State Guard are called upon to assist the National Guard with various events throughout the year.

The Vermont State Guard has also helped staff National Guard armories that would otherwise be closed while the National Guard has been deployed.

== Units ==
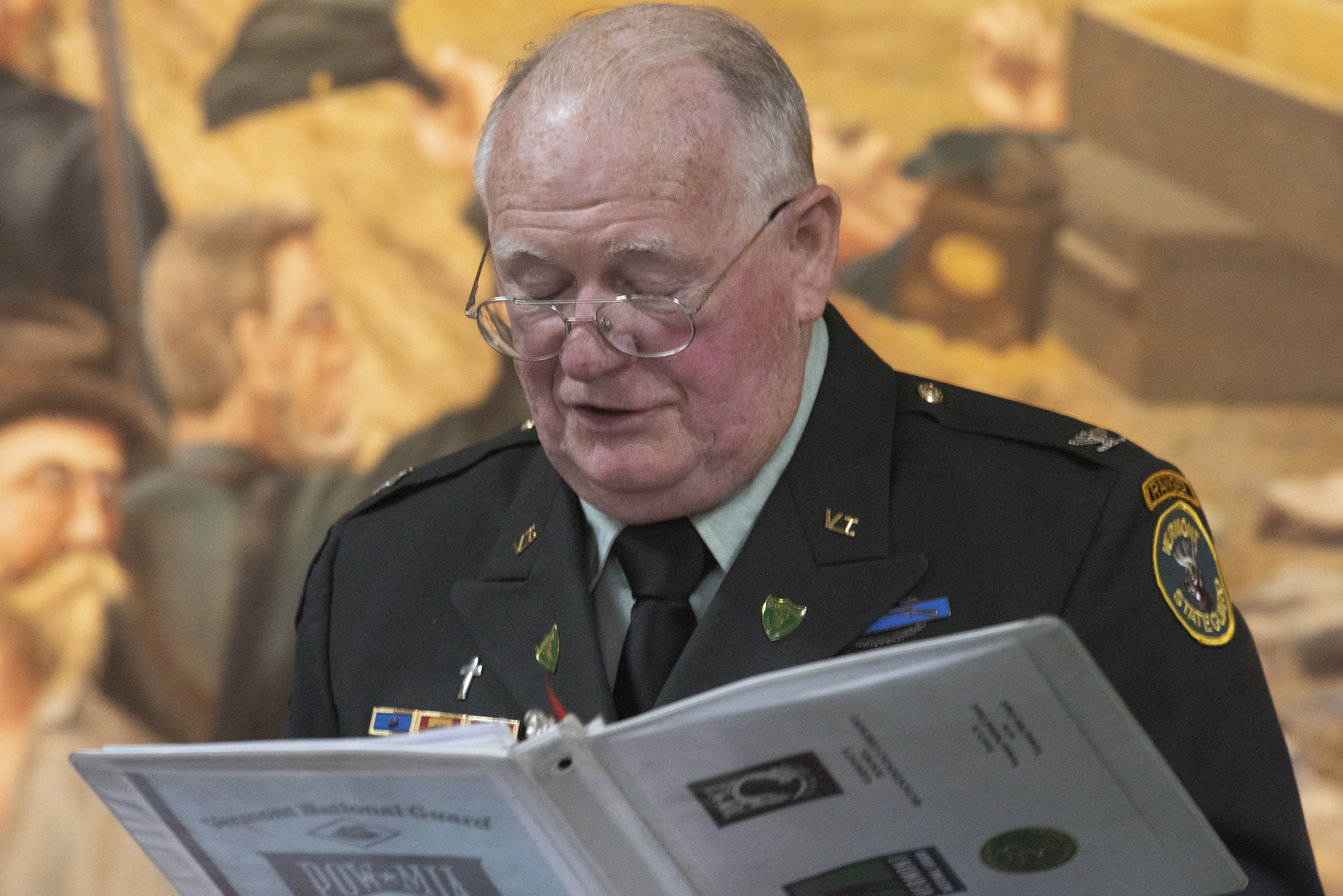
A Vermont State Guard chaplain delivers an invocation during a POW/MIA remembrance ceremony.

As of March 2025, these are the current active units of the Vermont State Guard:

| Designation | Location |
|---|---|
| Headquarters | Colchester |
| 1st Battalion | St. Albans |
| 2nd Battalion | Rutland |

== See also ==
- Naval Militia
- United States Coast Guard Auxiliary
- Vermont Wing Civil Air Patrol
