= 101st Air Refueling Wing =

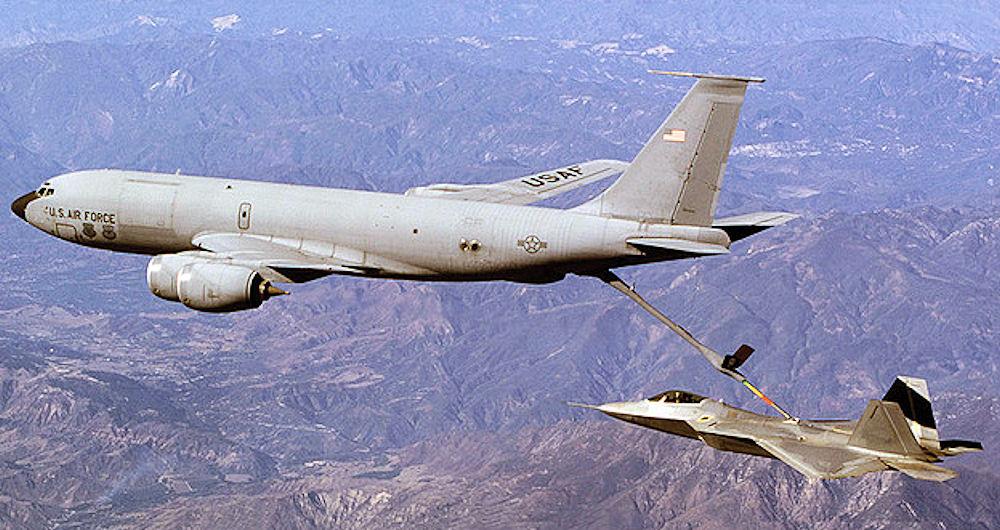
- 132d Air Refueling Squadron – Boeing KC-135R Stratotanker refueling an F-22A Raptor
- Active: 2 March 1942 – present
- Country: United States
- Allegiance: Maine
- Branch: Air National Guard
- Type: Wing
- Role: Aerial refueling
- Part of: Maine Air National Guard
- Garrison/HQ: Bangor Air National Guard Base, Bangor, Maine
- Nickname(s): "MAINEiacs"
- Motto(s): He Strikes As Lightning
- Tail Code: A white tailband with black text 'Maine' included.
- Engagements: Burma Campaign 1944–1945

The 101st Air Refueling Wing (101 ARW) is a unit of the Maine Air National Guard, stationed at Bangor Air National Guard Base, Bangor, Maine. If activated to federal service with the United States Air Force, the 101 ARW is operationally-gained by the Air Mobility Command (AMC).

== Units ==
In the late 2010s the wing consists of the following major units:

- 101st Operations Group

132d Air Refueling Squadron (KC-135R)

- 101st Maintenance Group
- 101st Mission Support Group
- 101st Medical Group

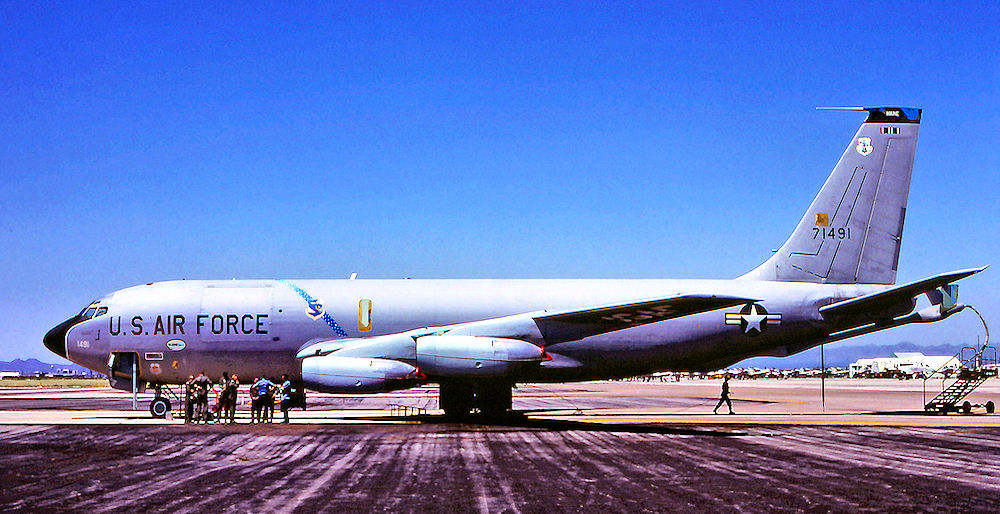
132d AREFS KC-135A 57-1491 about 1980 in SAC markings

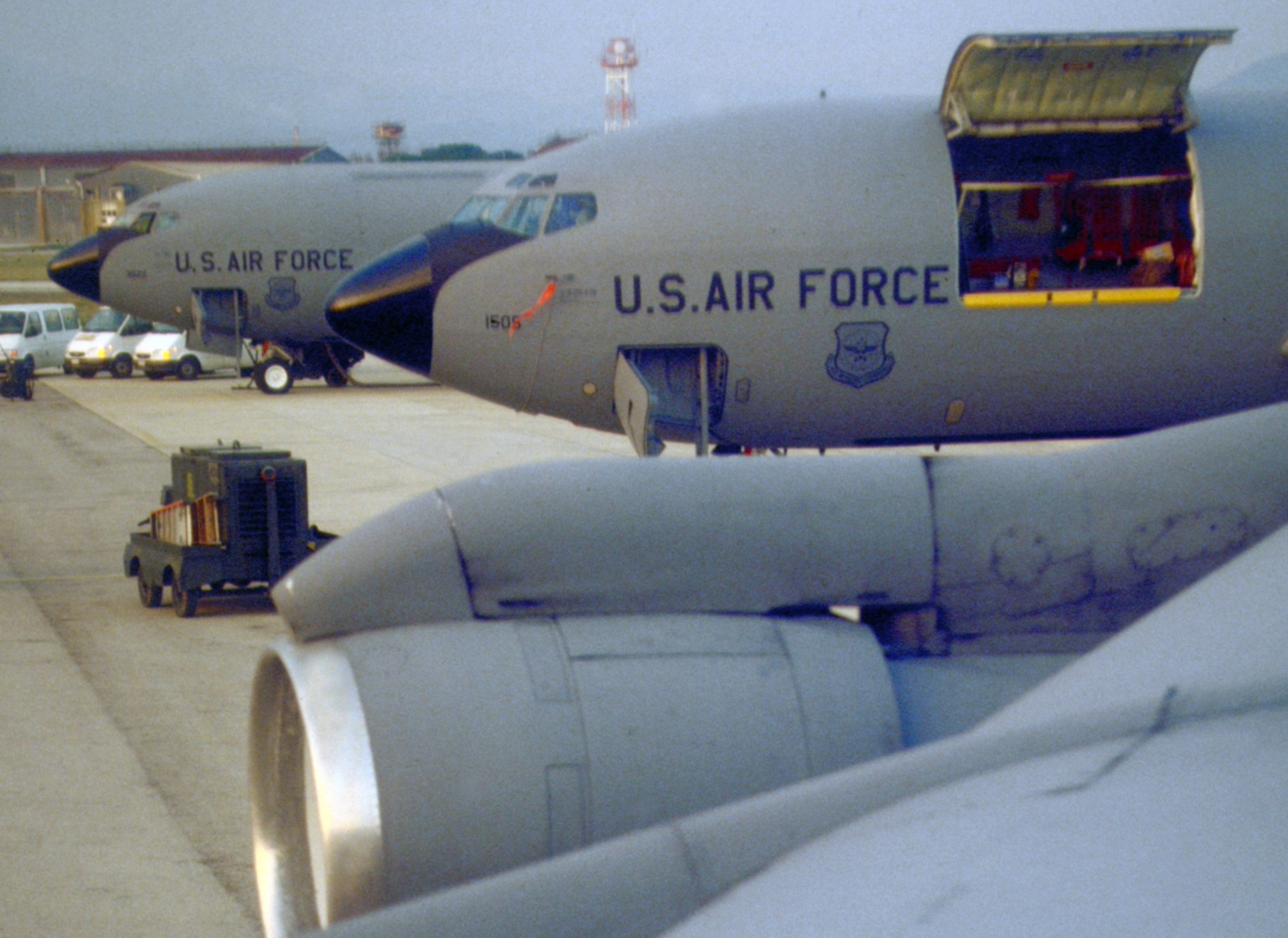
101st ARW KC-135Es at Pisa Airport, Italy, 1996

== History ==
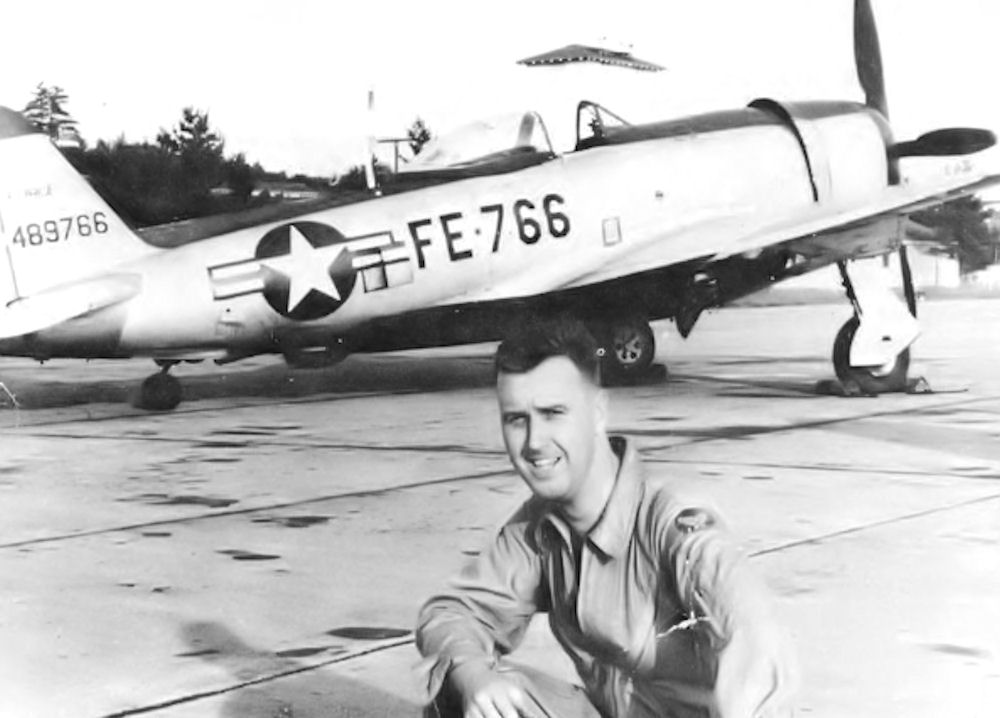
133d Fighter Squadron – Republic F-47D Thunderbolt, AF Ser. No. 44-89766, the first aircraft assigned to the New Hampshire Air National Guard

The mission of the 101st FIW was the air defense of New England. Its assigned squadrons were dispersed and equipped as follows:

- 132d Fighter-Interceptor Squadrons, Dow AFB (F-80C)
- 133d Fighter-Interceptor Squadrons, Grenier AFB (F-47D)
- 134th Fighter-Interceptor Squadrons, Burlington Municipal Airport (F-51H)

== Lineage ==
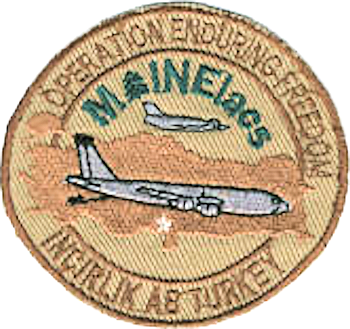
Operation Enduring Freedom Deployment Patch, 2005

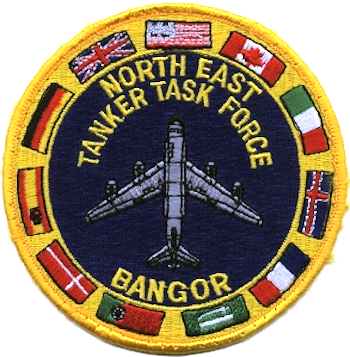
North East Tanker Task Force Patch, 1994

- Established as the 101st Fighter Wing in October 1950

Activated on 25 October 1950
Federalized and ordered to active service on 1 February 1951

- Redesignated 101st Fighter-Interceptor Wing on 10 February 1951

Inactivated on 6 February 1952

- Released from active duty and returned to Maine state control on 1 November 1952

Activated and received federal recognition on 1 November 1952

- Redesignated 101st Air Defense Wing on 14 April 1956
- Redesignated 101st Fighter-Interceptor Wing on 10 June 1972
- Redesignated 101st Air Refueling Wing on 1 July 1976

== Assignments ==
- Maine Air National Guard, 25 October 1950
- Eastern Air Defense Force, 10 February 1951
- Western Air Defense Force 2 August 1951 – 6 February 1952
- Maine Air National Guard, 1 November 1952 – present

Gaining commands
Air Defense Command (later Aerospace Defense Command), 1 November 1952
Strategic Air Command, 1 July 1976
Air Combat Command, 1 June 1992
Air Mobility Command, 1 June 1993 – present

== Components ==
- 101st Fighter-Interceptor Group (later 101st Fighter Group), 10 February 1951 – 6 February 1952; 1 November 1952 – 30 April 1954, 1 June 1954 – 31 March 1956, 15 April 1956 – 1 September 1960
- 101st Fighter Group (later 101st Fighter-Interceptor Group, 101st Air Refueling Group, 101st Operations Group), 1 September 1960 – 31 March 1976, 16 March 1992 – present
- 158th Fighter Group (Air Defense), 15 April 1956 – 1 July 1960

132d Fighter Squadron (later 132d Fighter-Interceptor Squadron, 132d Air Refueling Squadron), 31 March 1976 - (present?)

== Stations ==
- Dow Air Force Base, Maine, 25 October 1950
- Grenier Air Force Base, New Hampshire, 23 April 1951
- Larson Air Force Base, Washington, 2 August 1951 – 6 February 1952
- Dow Air Force Base (later Bangor International Airport, Bangor Air National Guard Base), 1 November 1952 – present

== Aircraft ==
- F-80C Shooting Star, 1950–1952
- F-86F Sabre 1952–1955
- F-94A Starfire, 1955–1957
- F-89D Scorpion, 1957–1959
- F-89J Scorpion, 1959–1969
- F-102A Delta Dagger 1959
- F-101B Voodoo 1969–1976
- KC-135A Stratotanker, 1976–1984
- KC-135E Stratotanker, 1984–2007
- KC-135R Stratotanker, 2007 – present
