= 23rd Air Division =

23rd Air Division
- Active: 1969–1987
- Country: United States
- Branch: United States Air Force
- Role: Command of air defense forces
- Part of: Aerospace Defense Command

Insignia
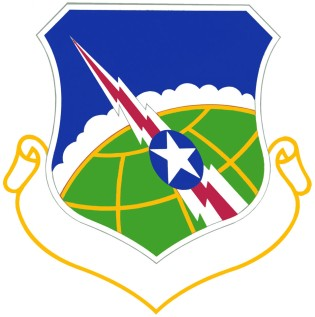
- 23d Air Division emblem (approved 28 July 1970)

The 23rd Air Division is an inactive United States Air Force intermediate echelon command and control organization. It was last assigned to First Air Force, Tactical Air Command (ADTAC). It was inactivated on 1 July 1987 at Tyndall Air Force Base, Florida.

== History ==
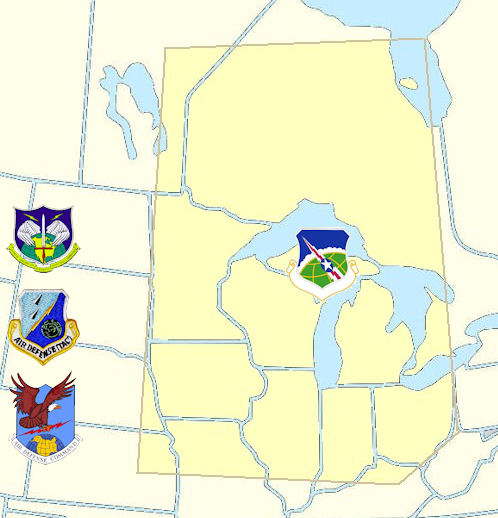
23rd Air Division ADC/TAC/NORAD Region AOR 1969-1979

The Division was activated at Duluth International Airport in November 1969, replacing the 29th Air Division in an Aerospace Defense Command (ADCOM) realignment and re-organization of assets. Assigned additional designations of 23rd CONAD Region and 23rd NORAD Region upon activation with reporting to the NORAD Combat Operations Center at the Cheyenne Mountain Complex, Colorado.

The 23rd AD was responsible for the air defense of a large area of the upper Midwest south of the 97th meridian west, bordered by the southern boundary of the Canada–United States border to the Ohio/Pennsylvania border; south and west along the western ridge of the Appalachian Mountains to the 38th parallel north. This encompassed most of Minnesota, Iowa, Northern Missouri, Wisconsin, Illinois, Indiana, Ohio and all of Michigan. It was also the command organization for the Semi Automatic Ground Environment (SAGE) Data Center (DC-10) at Duluth Air Force Station.

The division and its subordinate interceptor, missile and radar units participated in numerous exercises such as Amalgam Fairplay, Feathered Indian, and Feathered Brave. In addition, its subordinate units exercised with surface to air missiles. The scope of responsibility for the 23rd AD was expanded in 1973 with further ADCOM unit inactivations and consolidations to include the area south along the 88th meridian west to the 33rd parallel north, west to the 97th meridian west. This added all of Missouri and Arkansas, as well as western Tennessee and northern Mississippi to the Division's Area of Responsibly. It assumed additional designation 23rd ADCOM Region, 8 December 1978

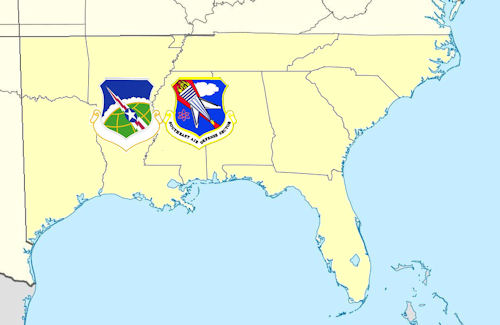
23rd Air Division/Southeast Air Defense Sector AOR, 1979-1987

In 1979 it was incorporated into Tactical Air Command with the inactivation of ADCOM as a major command. Under Air Defense, Tactical Air Command (ADTAC) it continued its mission until 15 April 1982 when it moved to Tyndall Air Force Base, Florida and assumed responsibility for most of the region previously commanded by the inactivated 20th Air Division.

In 1985 most active-duty units were inactivated or reassigned to other missions, and the air defense mission came under Air Force Reserve and Air National Guard units under First Air Force. The Division stood down on 1 July 1987, its command, mission, components, and assets were transferred to the ADTAC Southeast Air Defense Sector.

== Lineage ==
- Established as the 23rd Air Division on 18 November 1969

Activated on 19 November 1969
Inactivated on 1 July 1987

=== Assignments ===
- Aerospace Defense Command, 19 November 1969
- Tactical Air Command, 1 October 1979
- First Air Force, 6 December 1985 – 1 July 1987

=== Components ===
==== Interceptor units ====
- 1st Fighter Wing (Air Defense), 1 – 31 December 1969

Selfridge Air Force Base, Michigan

- 343rd Fighter Group (Air Defense), 19 November 1969 - 28 August 1970

Duluth Airport, Minnesota

- 2nd Fighter-Interceptor Squadron, 1 July 1971 - 31 March 1973

Wurtsmith Air Force Base, Michigan

- 94th Fighter-Interceptor Squadron, 1 December 1969 - 1 July 1971

Wurtsmith Air Force Base, Michigan

- 48th Fighter-Interceptor Squadron, 1 March 1983 - 1 July 1987

Langley Air Force Base, Virginia

- 62nd Fighter Interceptor Squadron, 19 November 1969 - 30 April 1971

K. I. Sawyer Air Force Base, Michigan

- 87th Fighter-Interceptor Squadron, 28 August 1970 - 1 August 1981

K. I. Sawyer Air Force Base, Michigan

==== Missile units ====
- 37th Air Defense Missile Squadron, 19 November 1969 - 31 July 1972

Kincheloe Air Force Base, Michigan

- 74th Air Defense Missile Squadron, 19 November 1969 - 30 April 1972

Duluth Air Force Station, Minnesota

==== Radar units ====
- 665th Air Defense Group, 1 March 1970 – 1 January 1974

Calumet Air Force Station, Michigan

- 692d Air Defense Group, 1 March 1970 – 1 January 1974

Baudette Air Force Station, Minnesota

- 661st Radar Squadron, 19 November 1969 – 1 July 1974

Selfridge Air Force Base, Michigan

- 665th Radar Squadron, 19 May 1969 – 1 March 1970

Calumet Air Force Station, Michigan

- 674th Radar Squadron, 19 November 1969 – 31 March 1975

Osceola Air Force Station, Wisconsin

- 676th Radar Squadron, 19 November 1969 – 30 June 1977

Antigo Air Force Station, Wisconsin

- 692nd Radar Squadron, 19 November 1969 – 1 March 1970

Baudette Air Force Station, Minnesota

- 739th Radar Squadron, 19 November 1969 – 30 September 1970

Wadena Air Force Station, Minnesota

- 752nd Radar Squadron, 19 November 1969 – 1 April 1978

Empire Air Force Station, Michigan

- 753rd Radar Squadron, 19 November 1969 – 30 October 1979

Sault Sainte Marie Air Force Station, Michigan

- 754th Radar Squadron, 19 November 1969 – 30 September 1988

Port Austin Air Force Station, Michigan

- 756th Radar Squadron, 19 November 1969 – 5 August 1980

Finland Air Force Station, Minnesota

- 701st Radar Squadron, 15 April 1982 – 30 June 1988

Fort Fisher Air Force Station North Carolina

=== Stations ===
- Duluth International Airport, Minnesota, 19 November 1969
- Tyndall Air Force Base, Florida, 15 April 1982 – 1 July 1987

== See also ==
- List of United States Air Force air divisions
- List of USAF Aerospace Defense Command General Surveillance Radar Stations
- Aerospace Defense Command Fighter Squadrons
