= 4706th Air Defense Wing =

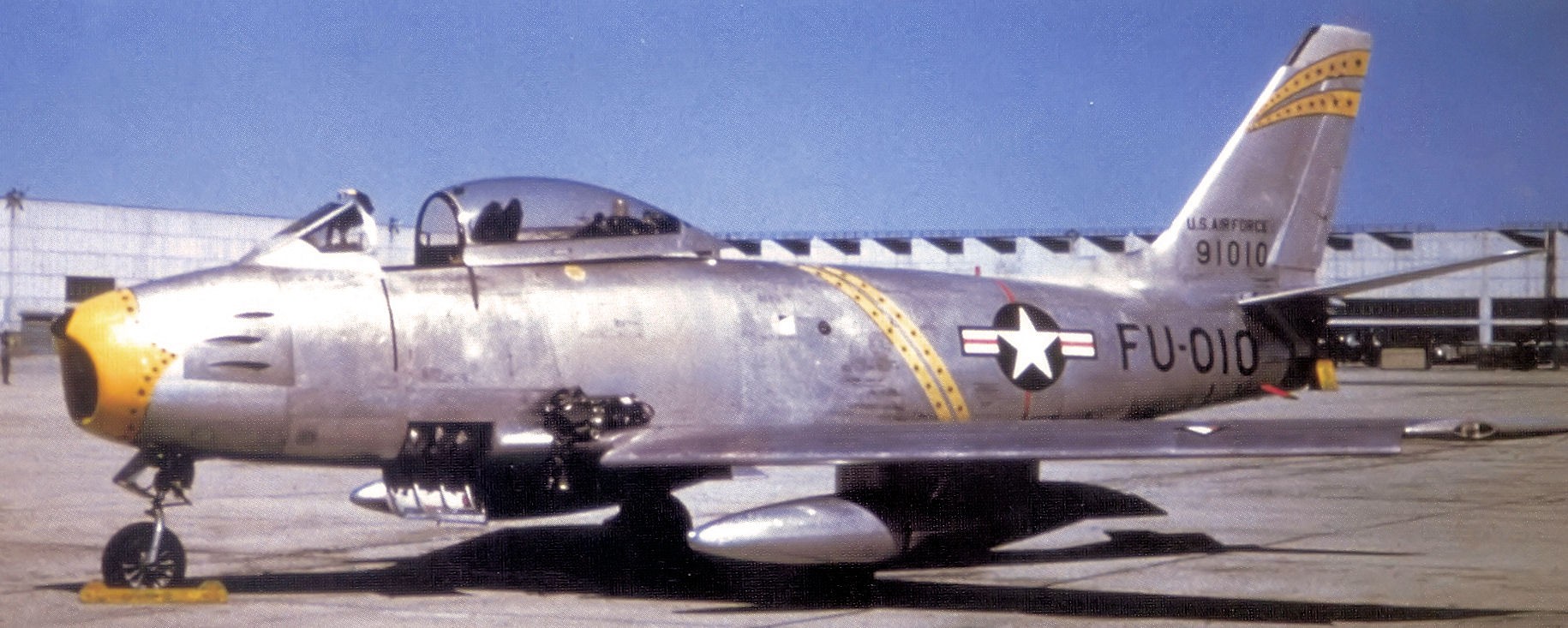
- 62d Fighter-Interceptor Squadron F-86A Sabre (Note: Aircraft is North American F-86A-5-NA Sabre, serial 49-1010.)
- Active: 1952–1956
- Country: United States
- Branch: United States Air Force
- Type: Fighter interceptor and Radar
- Role: Air defense

The 4706th Air Defense Wing is a discontinued United States Air Force organization. Its last assignment was with the 37th Air Division of Air Defense Command (ADC) at O'Hare International Airport, Illinois where it was discontinued in 1956. It was established in 1952 at O'Hare as the 4706th Defense Wing in a general reorganization of ADC, which replaced wings responsible for a base with wings responsible for a geographical area. It assumed control of several fighter interceptor squadrons that had been assigned to the 142d Fighter-Interceptor Wing, an Air National Guard wing mobilized for the Korean War and the 56th Fighter-Interceptor Group. In early 1953 it also was assigned six radar squadrons in the Midwest and its dispersed fighter squadrons combined with colocated air base squadrons into air defense groups. The wing was redesignated as an air defense wing in 1954. It was discontinued in 1956 and most of its units transferred to the 58th Air Division.

== History ==
The 4706th Defense Wing was organized at the beginning of 1952 at O'Hare IAP in a major reorganization of Air Defense Command (ADC) responding to ADC's difficulty under the existing wing base organizational structure in deploying fighter squadrons to best advantage. The wing assumed the operational squadrons and air defense mission of the inactivating 142d Fighter-Interceptor Wing, an Oregon Air National Guard wing, which had been federalized and moved to O'Hare in 1951 in the expansion of the USAF for the Korean War. The wing also received the regular USAF 62d Fighter-Interceptor Squadron. flying North American F-86 Sabre aircraft, at O'Hare from the inactivating 56th Fighter-Interceptor Group at Selfridge Air Force Base, Michigan and the 97th Fighter-Interceptor Squadron at Wright-Patterson Air Force Base, Ohio, which had been attached to the 142nd Wing. The wing also assumed command of units stationed elsewhere in this reorganization, the 113th Fighter-Interceptor Squadron, flying F-51H Mustangs, at Scott Air Force Base, Illinois, and the 166th Fighter-Interceptor Squadron, at Lockbourne Air Force Base, Ohio, flying Republic F-84 Thunderjet aircraft. Thus, the wing's fighter squadrons defended Illinois, Indiana, southern Wisconsin, western Michigan and western Ohio. Air base squadrons were also activated and assigned to the wing to provide support for USAF units stationed at bases where ADC was the host command.

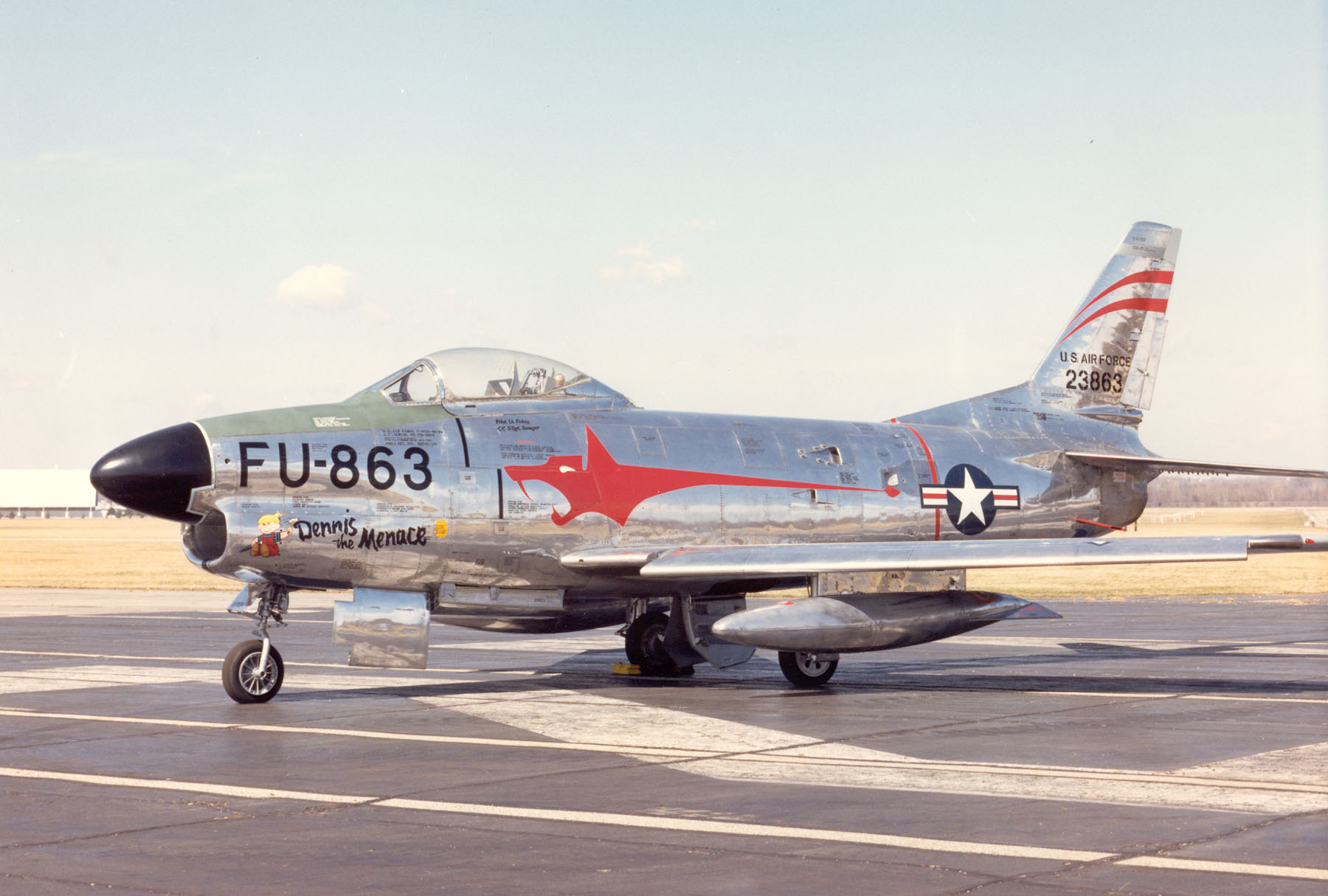
F-86D Sabre in 97th Fighter-Interceptor Squadron markings (Note: This airplane is on display at the National Museum of the United States Air Force, although it is marked as North American F-86D-40-NA Sabre 52-3863 of the 97th Squadron, it is in fact a different airplane. Dirkx, Marco (23 September 2025). "1952 USAF Serial Numbers". Joe Baugher’s Serial Number List.)

As ADC realigned during the year. the 113th Squadron was reassigned directly to Central Air Defense Force. Then in July, the 63d Fighter-Interceptor Squadron, another F-86 squadron at Oscoda Air Force Base, Michigan transferred into the wing, and in August, the 166th Squadron moved to Youngstown Municipal Airport, Ohio and was reassigned to the 4708th Defense Wing.

In February 1953 another ADC reorganization activated air defense groups at ADC bases with dispersed fighter squadrons. These groups assumed direct command of the fighter squadrons at their stations, in addition to support squadrons to assist in their role as USAF host organizations at the bases. The 501st Air Defense Group, activated at O'Hare, the 520th Air Defense Group, at Truax Field and the 534th Air Defense Group at Kinross Air Force Base (later Kincheloe Air Force Base), Michigan. Although the 527th Air Defense Group activated at Oscoda, it was assigned to another wing. Another result of the February 1953 reorganization was that the wing assumed the aircraft detection, control and warning mission, with six squadrons in four states being assigned to the wing.

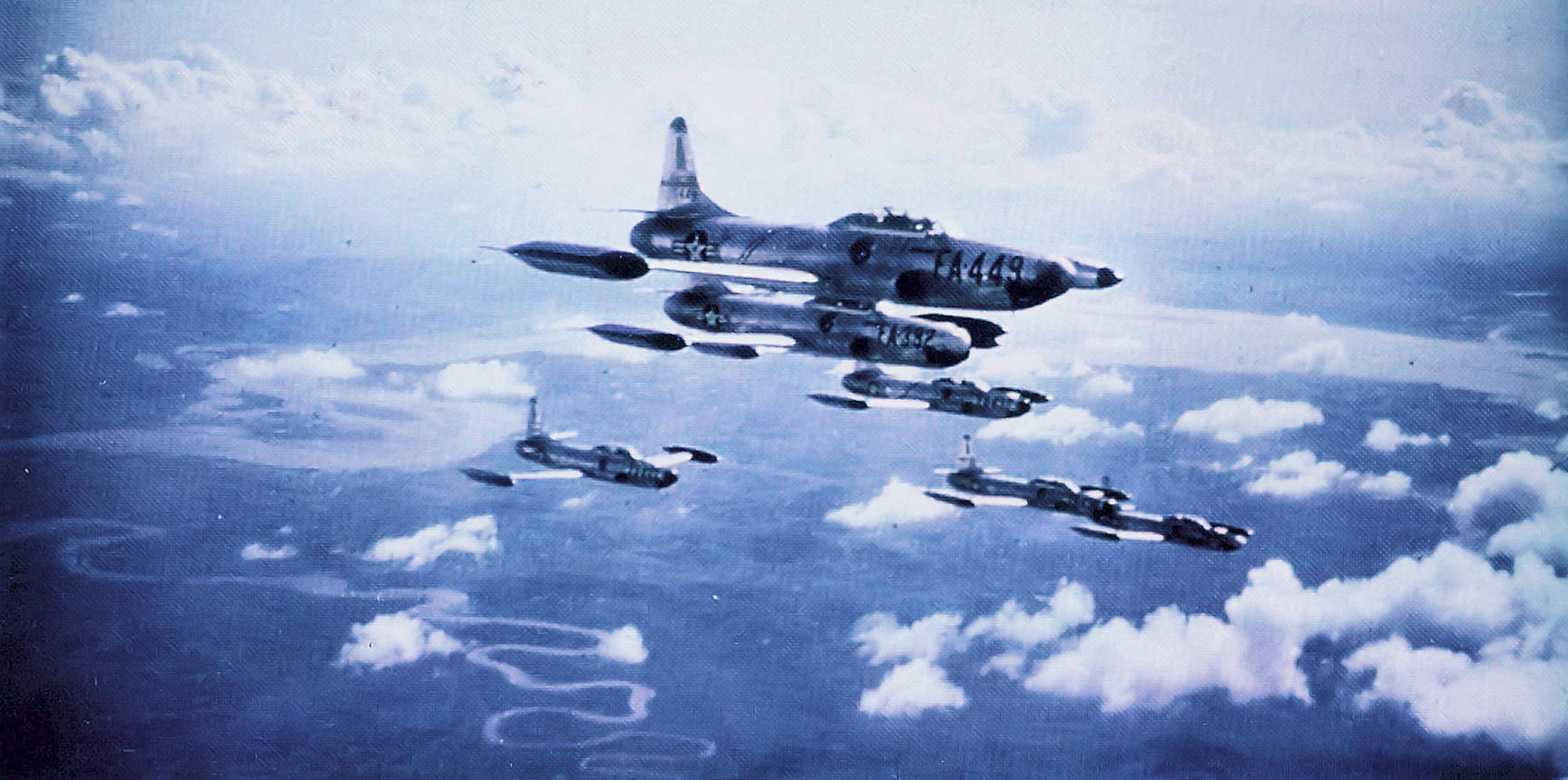
319th Fighter-Interceptor Squadron F-94Bs (Note: Lead aircraft is Lockheed F-94B-5-LO Starfire, serial 51-5449. While in Korea, this plane was credited with destroying a North Korean aircraft during a night mission. Dirkx, Marco (28 July 2025). "1951 USAF Serial Numbers". Joe Baugher’s Serial Number List.)

In 1955, ADC implemented Project Arrow, which was designed to bring back on the active list the fighter units that had compiled memorable records in the two world wars. As a result of Project Arrow, the 501st Group was replaced by the 56th Fighter Group (Air Defense), the 520th Group was replaced by the 327th Fighter Group (Air Defense), and the 534th Group was replaced by the 507th Fighter Group (Air Defense). Because Project Arrow called for fighter squadrons to be assigned to their traditional group headquarters, the 97th Squadron moved to Delaware and its personnel and equipment reassigned to the 56th Fighter-Interceptor Squadron. In early October, the 319th Fighter-Interceptor Squadron, flying Lockheed F-94 Starfire aircraft was assigned to the wing in anticipation of its return to the United States as the Korean war was ending.

The 56th and 319th Squadrons and three of the radar squadrons transferred from the wing to the 58th Air Division in March 1956 The wing was discontinued a few months later and its units assigned to other ADC organizations.

== Lineage ==
- Designated as the 4706th Defense Wing and organized on 1 February 1952

Redesignated as 4706th Air Defense Wing on 1 September 1954
Discontinued on 8 July 1956

=== Assignments ===
- Western Air Defense Force, 1 February 1952
- 30th Air Division, 16 February 1953
- 37th Air Division, 1 March 1956 – 8 July 1956

=== Stations ===
- O'Hare International Airport, Illinois, 1 February 1952 – 8 July 1956

=== Components ===
==== Groups ====
Air Defense Groups

- 501st Air Defense Group, 16 February 1953 – 18 August 1955 (Note: Component locations are with wing headquarters unless otherwise noted.)
- 520th Air Defense Group, 16 February 1953 – 18 August 1955

Truax Field, Wisconsin

- 534th Air Defense Group, 16 February 1953 – 18 August 1955

Kinross Air Force Base, Michigan

Fighter Groups

- 56th Fighter Group (Air Defense), 18 August 1955 – 8 July 1956
- 327th Fighter Group (Air Defense), 18 August 1955 – 8 July 1956

Truax Field, Wisconsin

- 507th Fighter Group (Air Defense), 18 August 1955 – 8 July 1956

Kinchloe Air Force Base, Michigan

==== Squadrons ====
Fighter Squadrons

- 56th Fighter-Interceptor Squadron, Ohio, 18 August 1955 – 1 March 1956

Wright-Patterson Air Force Base

- 62 Fighter-Interceptor Squadron, 6 February 1952 – 16 February 1953
- 63rd Fighter-Interceptor Squadron, 1 July 1952 – 16 February 1953

Oscoda Air Force Base, Michigan

- 97th Fighter-Interceptor Squadron, 6 February 1952 – 18 August 1955
- 113th Fighter-Interceptor Squadron, 6 February 1952 – 1 April 1952 (federalized Indiana Air National Guard)

Scott Air Force Base, Illinois

- 166th Fighter-Interceptor Squadron, 1 April 1952 – 30 March 1953 (Federalized Ohio Air National Guard)

Lockbourne Air Force Base, Ohio

- 319th Fighter-Interceptor Squadron, 1 April 1952 – 18 October 1955

Johnson Air Base, Japan until 18 October 1955, then Bunker Hill Air Force Base, Indiana

Radar Squadrons

- 664th Aircraft Control and Warning Squadron, 16 February 1953 – 1 March 1956

Bellefontaine Air Force Station, Ohio

- 665th Aircraft Control and Warning Squadron, 16 February 1953 – 8 July 1956

Keweenaw (later Calumet Air Force Station), Michigan, 16 February 1953 – 1 November 1953

- 781st Aircraft Control and Warning Squadron

Fort Custer, Michigan

- 782d Aircraft Control and Warning Squadron, 16 February 1953 – 1 March 1956

Rockville Air Force Station, Indiana

- 784th Aircraft Control and Warning Squadron, 16 February 1953 – 1 March 1956

Snow Mountain Air Force Station, Kentucky

Support Squadrons

- 83rd Air Base Squadron, 1 February 1952 – 16 February 1953
- 84th Air Base Squadron, 1 February 1952 – 16 February 1953

Oscoda Air Force Base, Michigan

- 91st Air Base Squadron, 14 November 1952 – 16 February 1953

Kinross Air Force Base, Michigan

=== Aircraft ===
- North American F-51D Mustang, 1952
- North American F-51H Mustang, 1952
- North American F-86A Sabre, 1952–1953
- North American F-86D Sabre, 1953–1956
- North American F-86E Sabre, 1952–1953
- North American F-86F Sabre, 1952, 1955–1956
- Republic F-84C Thunderjet, 1952
- Northrop F-89D Scorpion, 1953–1956
- Lockheed F-94B Starfire, 1953
- Lockheed F-94C Starfire, 1955–1956

=== Commanders ===
- Col. Fred T. Crimmins, Jr., 1 February 1952 – c. 8 July 1952
- Col. Benjamin S. Preston, Jr. 8 July 1952 – 27 July 1953
- Col. William D. Greenfield, 27 July 1953 – Unknown

== See also ==
- List of MAJCOM wings of the United States Air Force
- List of United States Air Force Aerospace Defense Command Interceptor Squadrons
- List of United States Air Force aircraft control and warning squadrons
