= 4708th Air Defense Wing =

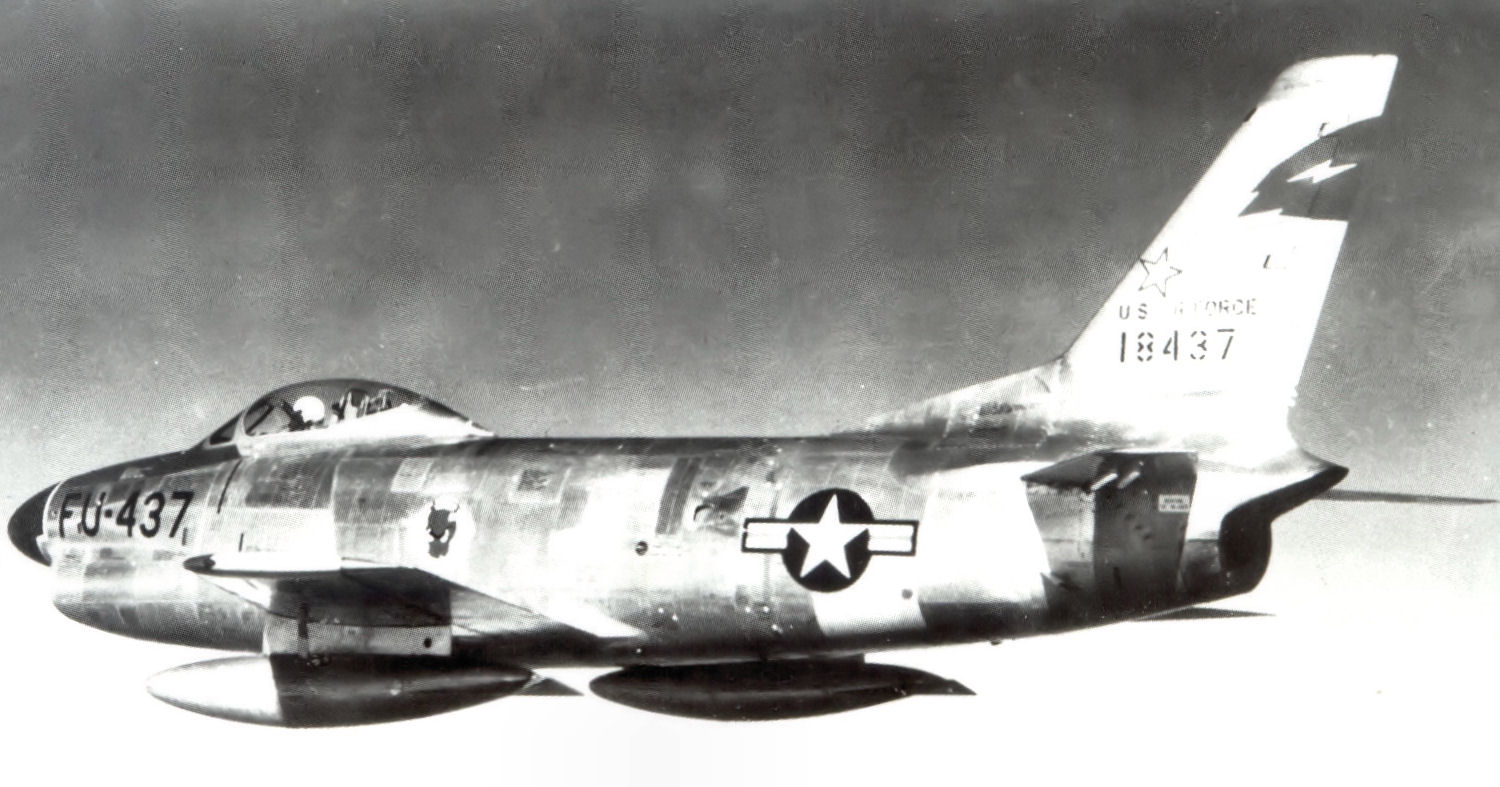
- F-86D of the wing's 13th Fighter-Interceptor Squadron
- Active: 1952–1956
- Country: United States
- Branch: United States Air Force
- Type: Fighter interceptor and radar
- Role: Air defense
- Size: Wing

The 4708th Air Defense Wing is a discontinued United States Air Force organization. Its last assignment was with the 30th Air Division of Air Defense Command (ADC) at Selfridge Air Force Base, Michigan, where it was discontinued in 1956. It was established in 1952 at Selfridge as the 4708th Defense Wing in a general reorganization of ADC, which replaced wings responsible for a base with wings responsible for a geographical area. It assumed control of several fighter Interceptor squadrons that had been assigned to the 56th Fighter-Interceptor Wing, some of which were Air National Guard squadrons mobilized for the Korean War.

In early 1953 it also was assigned nine radar squadrons in the Midwest. Several of these radar squadrons were located in Canada as part of the Mid-Canada Line. At the same time its dispersed fighter squadrons combined with colocated air base squadrons into air defense groups. The wing was redesignated as an air defense wing in 1954. It was discontinued in and its units transferred to the 30th Air Division in 1956.

== History ==
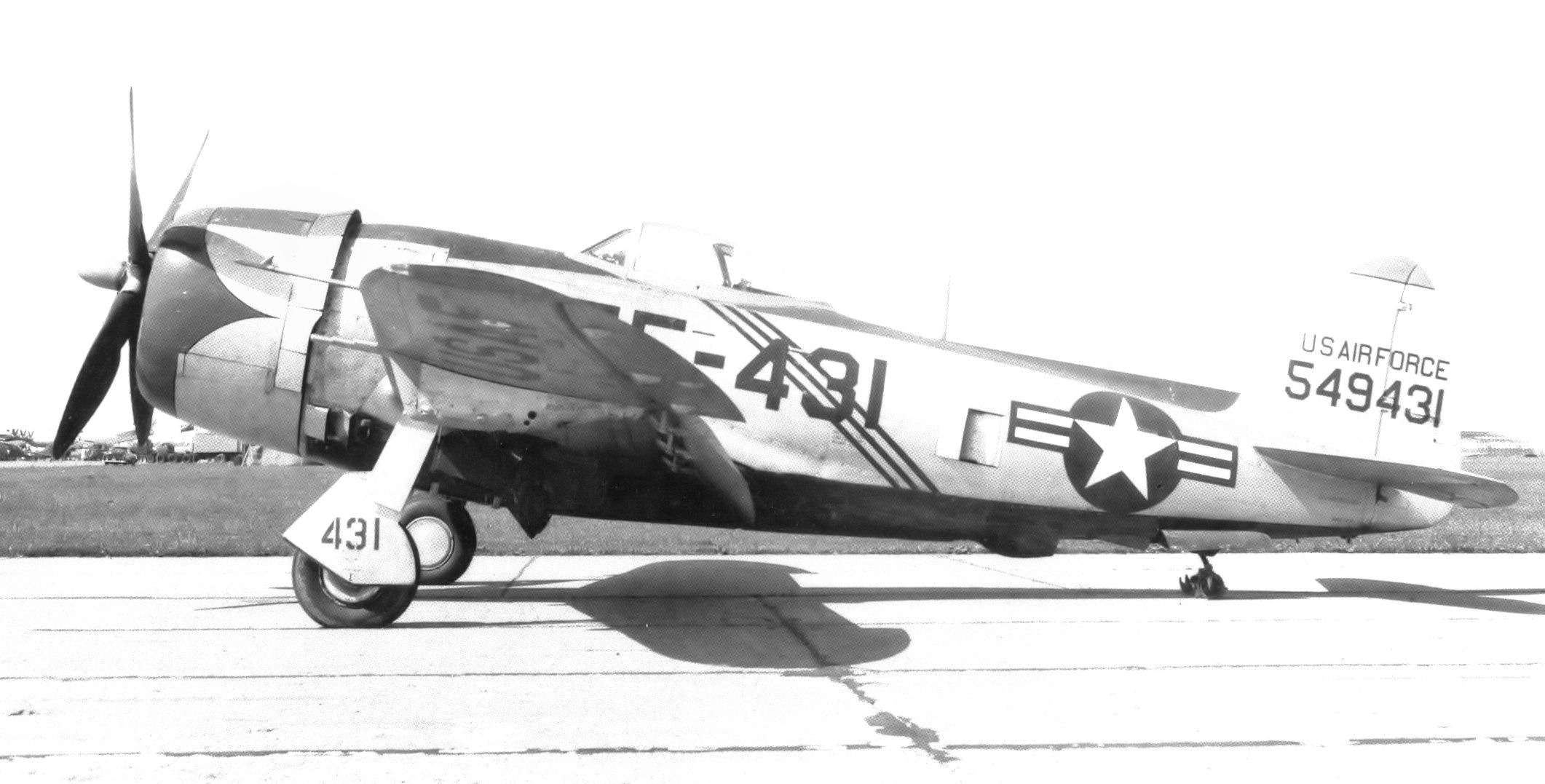
F-47D of the wing's 47th FIS

The wing was organized as the 4708th Defense Wing the beginning of February 1952 at Selfridge Air Force Base, Michigan as part of a major reorganization of Air Defense Command (ADC) responding to ADC's difficulty under the existing wing base organizational structure in deploying fighter squadrons to best advantage. It assumed operational control and the air defense mission of fighter squadrons formerly assigned to the inactivating 56th Fighter-Interceptor Wing. The 61st Fighter-Interceptor Squadron, flying Lockheed F-94 Starfire aircraft, and the 172d Fighter-Interceptor Squadron flying World War II era North American F-51 Mustang aircraft were located at Selfridge, while the 63d Fighter-Interceptor Squadron, flying North American F-86 Sabre aircraft, was located at Oscoda Air Force Base. The 136th Fighter-Interceptor Squadron at Niagara Falls Municipal Airport, flying World War II era Republic F-47 Thunderbolt aircraft was also transferred to the wing from the 101st Fighter-Interceptor Wing, and the 71st Fighter-Interceptor Squadron at Greater Pittsburgh Airport, another F-86 unit, was transferred from the 1st Fighter-Interceptor Wing. The support elements of the 56th Wing's 56th Air Base Group and 56th Maintenance & Supply Group were replaced at Selfridge by the wing's 575th Air Base Group, and air base squadrons were activated at each of the dispersed locations assigned to the wing to support the fighter squadrons at those stations. The wing's mission was to train and maintain tactical units in a state of readiness to intercept and destroy enemy aircraft attempting to penetrate the air defense system in the Great Lakes area.

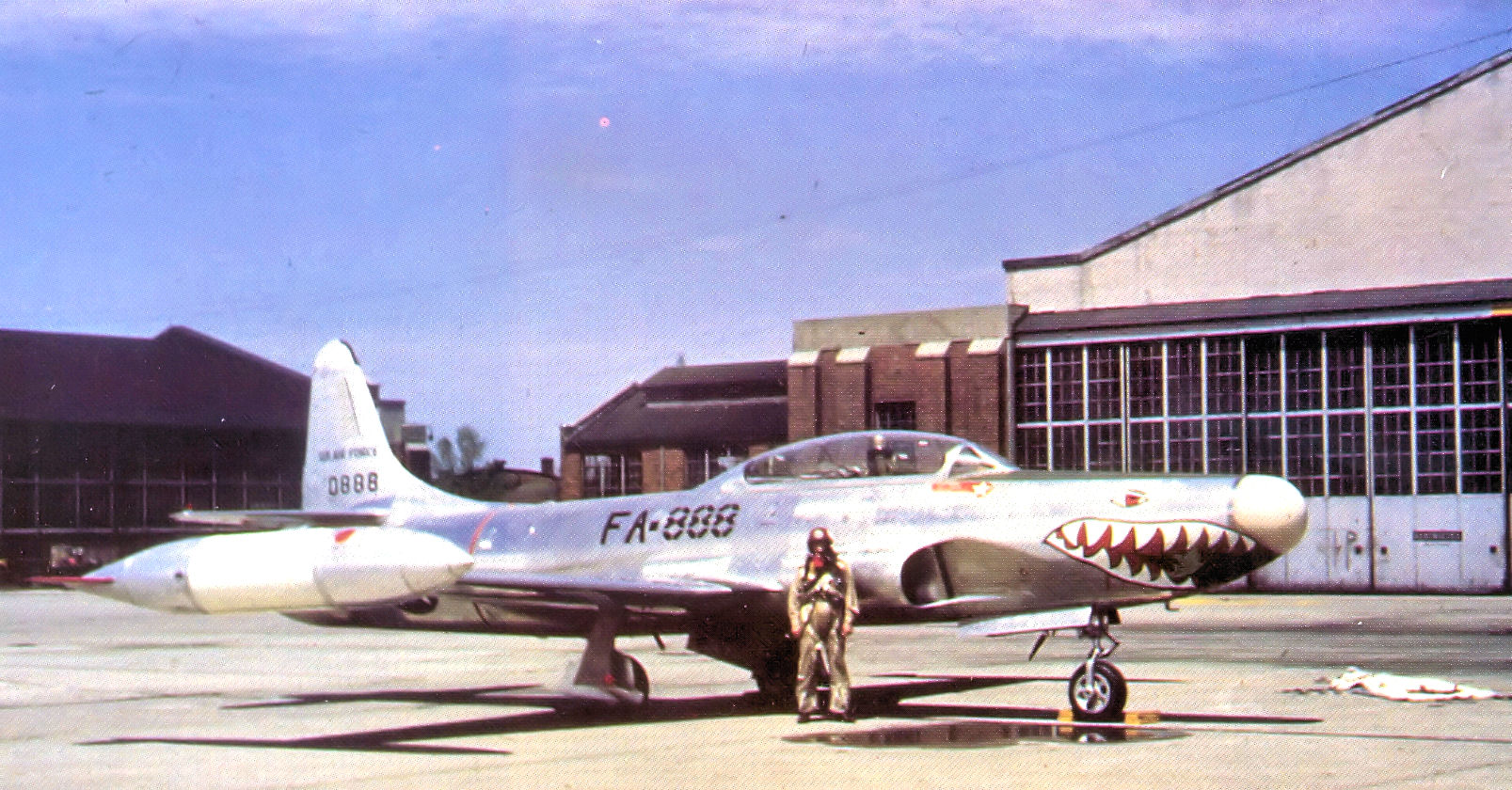
61st FIS F-94B Starfire

In July 1952, the units at Oscoda were transferred to the 4706th Defense Wing, while in the following month, the 166th Fighter-Interceptor Squadron, at Youngstown Municipal Airport, flying Republic F-84 Thunderjet aircraft, was transferred in from the 4706th. In November, the federalized Air National Guard squadrons were returned to state control. The 136th was returned to the New York Air National Guard and replaced by the 47th Fighter-Interceptor Squadron, the 166th was returned to the Ohio Air National Guard and replaced by the 86th Fighter-Interceptor Squadron, and the 172nd was returned to the Michigan Air National Guard, and replaced by the 431st Fighter-Interceptor Squadron. Another F-51 squadron, the 56th Fighter-Interceptor Squadron, was activated at Selfridge later that month. although it converted to F-86 aircraft by the start of 1953.

In February 1953, another major reorganization of ADC activated air defense groups at ADC bases with dispersed fighter squadrons. These groups were assigned to the wing and assumed direct control of the interceptor squadrons at those bases, as well as support squadrons to carry out their role as the USAF host organizations at the bases. As a result of this reorganization, the 575th Air Base Group was redesignated the 575th Air Defense Group and assumed control of the fighter squadrons at Selfridge, while the 500th Air Defense Group at Pittsburgh and the 502d Air Defense Group at Youngstown controlled the squadrons at these locations. Oscoda (now renamed Wurtsmith Air Force Base), where the 527th Air Defense Group was activated, returned to the control of the wing. Although the 518th Air Defense Group took over operations at Niagara Falls, it was assigned to another wing. The reorganization also resulted in the wing adding the radar detection, control and warning mission, and it was assigned eight aircraft xontrol & warning qquadrons in the United States and Canada to perform this mission. In November it added an additional radar squadron.

In 1955, ADC implemented Project Arrow, which was designed to bring back on the active list the fighter units which had compiled memorable records in the two world wars. As a result of this project, the 500th Group was replaced by the 54th Fighter Group (Air Defense), the 502nd Group was replaced by the 79th Fighter Group (Air Defense), the 527th Group was replaced by the 412th Fighter Group (Air Defense), and the 575th Group was replaced by the 1st Fighter Group (Air Defense).

In March 1956, the 4711th Air Defense Wing moved to Selfridge from Presque Isle Air Force Base, Maine and three of the 4708th's radar squadrons were assigned to it. Niagara Falls briefly was assigned to the wing in this realignment. The fighter groups and remaining radar detection and control squadrons of the wing were transferred to the 30th Air Division in July. With no remaining operational mission, the wing and the 4711th Wing were discontinued in July 1956 They would be replaced shortly by the 1st Fighter Wing (Air Defense), which was activated on 18 October 1956.

== Lineage ==
- Designated as the 4708th Defense Wing and organized on 1 February 1952

Redesignated as 4708th Air Defense Wing on 1 July 1954
Discontinued on 8 July 1956

=== Assignments ===
- Eastern Air Defense Force, 1 February 1952
- 30th Air Division, 16 February 1953 – 18 October 1956

=== Stations ===
- Selfridge Air Force Base, Michigan, 1 February 1952 – 18 October 1956

=== Components ===
==== Groups ====
Fighter Groups

- 1st Fighter Group (Air Defense), 18 August 1955 – 8 July 1956
- 15th Fighter Group (Air Defense), New York, 1 March 1956 – 8 July 1956

Niagara Falls Municipal Airport

- 54th Fighter Group (Air Defense), 18 August 1955 – 8 July 1956

Greater Pittsburgh Airport, Pennsylvania

- 79th Fighter Group (Air Defense), 18 August 1955 – 8 July 1956

Youngstown Municipal Airport, Ohio

- 412th Fighter Group (Air Defense), 18 August 1955 – 8 July 1956

Wurtsmith Air Force Base, Michigan

Air Defense Groups

- 500th Air Defense Group, 16 February 1953 – 18 August 1955

Greater Pittsburgh Airport, Pennsykvania

- 502d Air Defense Group, 16 February 1953 – 18 August 1955

Youngstown Municipal Airport, Ohio

- 527th Air Defense Group, 16 February 1953 – 18 August 1955

Wurtsmith Air Force Base, Michigan

- 575th Air Base Group (later 575th Air Defense Group), 1 February 1952 – 18 August 1955

==== Squadrons ====
Fighter Squadrons

- 47th Fighter-Interceptor Squadron, 1 December 1952 – 16 February 1953

Niagara Falls Municipal Airport

- 56th Fighter-Interceptor Squadron, 27 November 1952 – 16 February 1953
- 61st Fighter-Interceptor Squadron, 6 February 1952 – 16 February 1953
- 63d Fighter-Interceptor Squadron, 6 February 1952 – 1 July 1952

Oscoda AFB, Michigan

- 71st Fighter-Interceptor Squadron

Greater Pittsburgh Airport, Pennsylvania, 6 February 1952 – 16 February 1953

- 86th Fighter-Interceptor Squadron

Youngstown Municipal Airport, Ohio, 1 November 1952 – 16 February 1953

- 136th Fighter-Interceptor Squadron

Niagara Falls Municipal Airport, New York, 6 February 1952 – 1 November 1952

- 166th Fighter-Interceptor Squadron, c. 1 August 1952 – 1 November 1952

Youngstown Municipal Airport, Ohio

- 172nd Fighter-Interceptor Squadron, 6 February 1952 – 1 November 1952
- 431st Fighter-Interceptor Squadron, 1 November 1952 – 16 February 1953

Support Squadrons

- 76th Air Base Squadron

Niagara Falls Municipal Airport, New York, 1 February 1952 – 16 February 1953

- 81st Air Base Squadron

Greater Pittsburgh Airport, Pennsylvania, 1 February 1952 – 16 February 1953

- 84th Air Base Squadron

Oscoda Air Force Base, Michigan, 1 February 1952 – 1 July 1952

- 88th Air Base Squadron

Youngstown Municipal Airport, Ohio, 1 February 1952 – 16 February 1953

Radar Squadrons

- 661st Aircraft Control and Warning Squadron, 16 February 1953 – 8 July 1956
- 662d Aircraft Control and Warning Squadron, 16 February 1953 – 8 July 1956

Brookfield Air Force Station, Ohio

- 677th Aircraft Control and Warning Squadron, 5 May 1954 – 8 July 1956

Willow Run Air Force Station, Michigan until 5 May 1954, then Alpena, Michigan

- 752d Aircraft Control and Warning Squadron, 16 February 1953 – 1 March 1956

Empire Air Force Station, Michigan

- 754th Aircraft Control and Warning Squadron, 16 February 1953 – 8 July 1956

Port Austin Air Force Station, Michigan

- 781st Aircraft Control and Warning Squadron, 1 November 1953 – 8 July 1956

Fort Custer, Michigan

- 783d Aircraft Control and Warning Squadron, 16 February 1953 – 1 March 1956

Guthrie Air Force Station, West Virginia

- 809th Aircraft Control and Warning Squadron, 1 May 1954 – 1 March 1956

Willow Run Air Force Station, Michigan, until c. 1 December 1954, then Owingsville Air Force Station, Kentucky

- 912th Aircraft Control and Warning Squadron, 16 February 1953 – 8 July 1956

Ramore Air Station, Ontario

- 913th Aircraft Control and Warning Squadron, 16 February 1953 – 8 July 1956

Pagwa Air Station, Ontario

- 914th Aircraft Control and Warning Squadron, 16 February 1953 – 8 July 1956

Armstrong Air Station, Ontario

=== Aircraft ===
- F-47D, 1952
- F-51D, 1952–1953
- F-84C, 1952
- F-86A, 1952
- F-86D, 1953–1955
- F-86F, 1952–1954
- F-89D, 1955
- F-94B, 1952–1953

=== Commanders ===
- Col. George S. Brown, 1 February 1952 – ca. 31 March 1952
- Col. Francis R. Royal, ca. 1 April 1952 – 16 July 1953
- Col. George B. Greene, Jr., 16 July 1953 – unknown

== See also ==
- List of MAJCOM wings of the United States Air Force
- List of United States Air Force Aerospace Defense Command Interceptor Squadrons
- List of United States Air Force aircraft control and warning squadrons
