= Rockville Air Force Station =

Closed air force station in Indiana, United States

Rockville Air Force Station
- Part of Air Defense Command (ADC)

Site information
- Type: Air Force Station
- Controlled by: United States Air Force

Location
- Location of Rockville AFS, Indiana
- Coordinates: 39°46′31″N 087°15′24″W

Site history
- Built: 1951
- In use: 1951-1966

Garrison information
- Garrison: 782d Aircraft Control and Warning (later Radar) Squadron

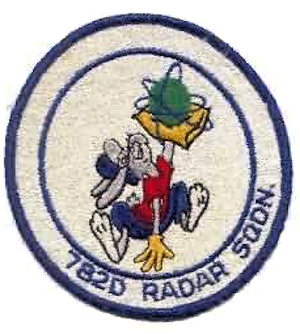
Emblem of the 782d Radar Squadron

Rockville Air Force Station (ADC ID: P-53, NORAD ID: Z-63) is a closed United States Air Force General Surveillance Radar station. It is located 1.7 miles (2.7 km) west-northwest of Rockville, Indiana. It was closed in 1966.

== History ==
Rockville Air Force Station was one of twenty-eight stations built as part of the second segment of the Air Defense Command permanent radar network. Prompted by the start of the Korean War, on 11 July 1950, the Secretary of the Air Force asked the Secretary of Defense for approval to expedite construction of the permanent network. Receiving the Defense Secretary's approval on 21 July, the Air Force directed the Corps of Engineers to proceed with construction.

Opened in 1951, the 782d Aircraft Control and Warning Squadron was activated on 16 April. It began operating a pair of AN/FPS-10 radars at Rockville in May 1952, and initially the station functioned as a Ground-Control Intercept (GCI) and warning station. As a GCI station, the squadron's role was to guide interceptor aircraft toward unidentified intruders picked up on the unit's radar scopes. In the mid / late 1950s, an AN/CPS-6B search radar was in use, according to one veteran.

During 1959 Rockville AFS joined the Semi Automatic Ground Environment (SAGE) system, feeding data to DC-07 at Truax Field, Wisconsin. After joining, the squadron was redesignated as the 782d Radar Squadron (SAGE) on 1 November 1959. The radar squadron provided information 24/7 the SAGE Direction Center where it was analyzed to determine range, direction altitude speed and whether or not aircraft were friendly or hostile. By 1960 the original radars had been phased out and replaced by two AN/FPS-6 height-finder radars and an AN/FPS-7B search radar. On 31 July 1963, the site was redesignated as NORAD ID Z-53.

In addition to the main facility, Rockville operated an AN/FPS-18 Gap Filler site:

- Neoga, IL (P-53A) 39°20′15″N 088°23′48″W

Rockville AFS was closed on 2 June 1966 due to budget reductions; sold to the state of Indiana and is now the Rockville Correctional Facility. Many former Air Force buildings are still in use.

== Air Force units and assignments ==
=== Units ===
- Constituted as the 782d Aircraft Control and Warning Squadron

Activated on 16 April 1951
Redesignated 782d Radar Squadron (SAGE) on 1 November 1959
Discontinued and inactivated on 25 June 1966

=== Assignments ===
- 541st Aircraft Control and Warning Group, 16 April 1951
- 30th Air Division, 6 February 1952
- 4706th Air Defense Wing (later 4706th Air Defense Wing), 16 February 1953
- 58th Air Division, 1 March 1956
- 37th Air Division, 1 September 1958
- 30th Air Division, 1 April 1959
- Chicago Air Defense Sector, 1 June 1959
- 20th Air Division, 1 April-25 June 1966

== See also ==
- List of USAF Aerospace Defense Command General Surveillance Radar Stations
- List of United States Air Force aircraft control and warning squadrons
