= 166th Air Refueling Squadron =

Ohio Air National Guard unit

166th Air Refueling Squadron

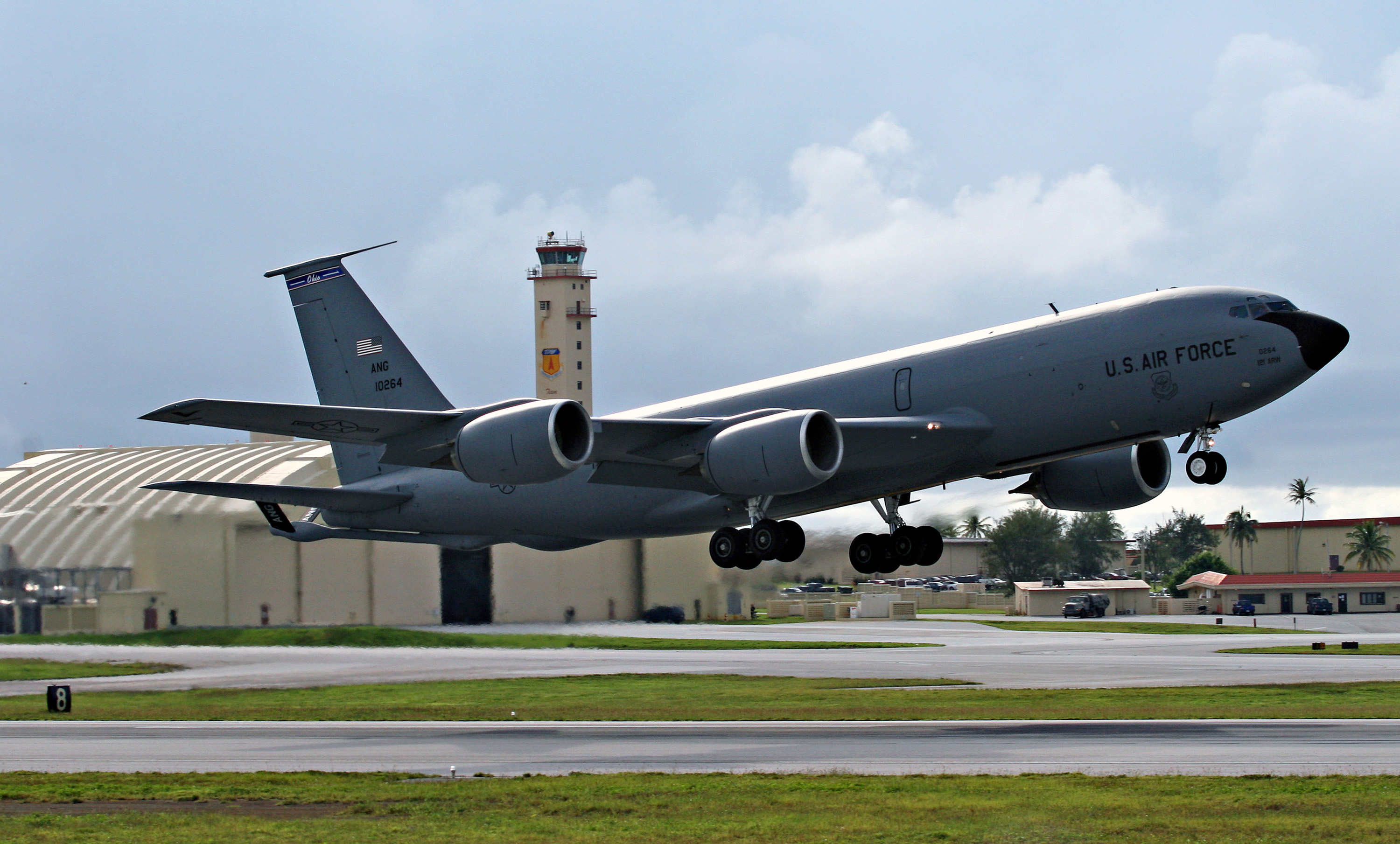
- 121st Air Refueling Wing KC-135R Stratotanker takes off for an aerial refueling mission from Andersen Air Force Base, Guam
- Active: 1942–1946}1947–1952; 1952–present
- Country: United States
- Allegiance: Ohio
- Branch: Air National Guard
- Type: Squadron
- Role: Aerial refueling
- Part of: Ohio Air National Guard
- Garrison/HQ: Rickenbacker Air National Guard Base, Ohio
- Decorations: Distinguished Unit Citation French Croix de Guerre with Palm

Insignia
- 166th Air Refueling Squadron emblem

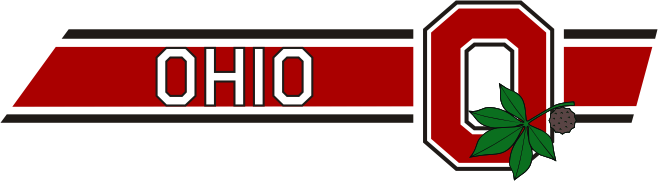
- Tail stripe

The 166th Air Refueling Squadron is a unit of the Ohio Air National Guard 121st Air Refueling Wing located at Rickenbacker Air National Guard Base, Columbus, Ohio. Since 1993 the 166th has been equipped with ten Boeing KC-135R Stratotankers.

Prior to 1993, the unit was known as 166th Tactical Fighter Squadron, operating a variety of fighter and ground-attack aircraft including Republic F-84 Thunderjet, North American F-100 Super Sabre and LTV A-7 Corsair II.

== History ==
=== World War II ===
The 364th Fighter Squadron was established at Hamilton Field, California in December 1942 and was part of the 357th Fighter Group.

It became part of the United States Air Forces in Europe army of occupation in Germany during 1945. It was inactivated in Germany during August 1946.

=== Ohio Air National Guard ===
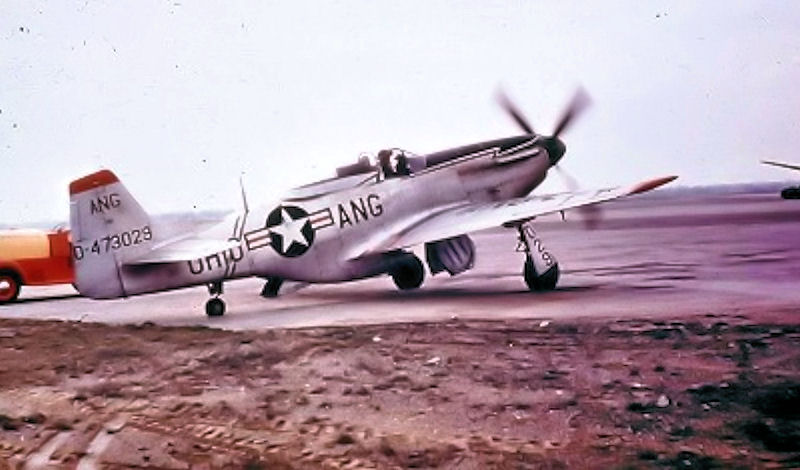
166th Fighter Squadron – North American F-51D-25-NA Mustang 44-73029

The 364th Squadron was redesignated the 166th Fighter Squadron, and was allotted to the National Guard, on 24 May 1946. It was organized at Lockbourne Army Air Field, Ohio, and was extended federal recognition on 10 November 1947 by the National Guard Bureau. The 166th Fighter Squadron was assigned initially to the Illinois ANG 66th Fighter Wing, operationally gained by Continental Air Command. On 7 December 1947 the Ohio ANG 55th Fighter Wing, was federally recognized and the squadron was transferred.

With the formation and federal recognition of the Ohio ANG 121st Fighter Group at Lockbourne, near Columbus, the squadron was reassigned. The mission of the 166th Fighter Squadron was the air defense of Ohio. Parts were no problem and many of the maintenance personnel were World War II veterans so readiness was quite high and the planes were often much better maintained than their USAF counterparts. In some ways, the postwar Air National Guard was almost like a flying country club and a pilot could often show up at the field, check out an aircraft and go flying. However, the unit also had regular military exercises that kept up proficiency and in gunnery and bombing contests they would often score at least as well or better than active-duty USAF units, given the fact that most ANG pilots were World War II combat veterans.

In October 1948 the squadron exchanged its North American F-51D Mustangs for F-51H Mustang very long range escort fighters that were suitable for long-range interception of unknown aircraft identified by Ground Control Interceptor radar stations, the 166th being one of the first ANG squadrons to receive the F-51H. In March 1950, the squadron entered the jet age with the receipt of Republic F-84C Thunderjets.

==== Korean War federalization ====
With the surprise invasion of South Korea on 25 June 1950, and the regular military's lack of readiness, most of the Air National Guard was called to active duty. The 166th Fighter Squadron was federalized on 10 February 1951 and assigned to the 122d Fighter-Interceptor Group of the Indiana Air National Guard of Air Defense Command (ADC) as the 166th Fighter-Interceptor Squadron. The squadron initially remained at Lockbourne and flew air defense training missions.

On 20 September, the 166th was reassigned to the Federalized Oregon ANG 142d Fighter-Interceptor Group which was headquartered at O'Hare International Airport with no change of mission. However, ADC was experiencing difficulty under the existing wing base organizational structure in deploying its fighter squadrons to best advantage. Therefore, in February 1952 the squadron was reassigned to the 4706th Defense Wing, which was organized on a geographic basis.

However, Strategic Air Command (SAC) had taken over Lockbourne AFB on 1 April 1951 and it was decided to move the 166th to Youngstown Municipal Airport, Ohio, which was accomplished in August 1952. The move resulted in a reassignment to the 4708th Air Defense Wing. The squadron was released from Federal Service and returned to Ohio state control on 1 November and its mission, personnel and F-84 aircraft at Youngstown were taken over by the 86th Fighter-Interceptor Squadron.

==== Air defense command ====
After the Korean War mobilization ended, the ADC 86th Fighter-Interceptor Squadron assumed the assets of the 166th Fighter-Interceptor Squadron F-84Cs and many of their personnel.

The 166th was re-equipped with F-51H Mustangs which the squadron flew until 1954 when the 166th received refurbished F-80A Shooting Stars that had been modified and upgraded to F-80C standards. With the F-80s, the squadron began standing daytime air defense alert at Youngstown, placing two aircraft at the end of the runway with pilots in the cockpit from one hour before sunrise until one hour after sunset. The squadron only operated the Shooting Star until January 1955 when the 166th received F-84E Thunderjets that had returned from wartime duty in Korea.

Upgraded with new F-84F Thunderstreaks in November 1957, the gaining command of the squadron became Tactical Air Command (TAC), however, it remained attached to Air Defense Command in a secondary role. In 1959, the need for active duty Air Defense Command bases and regular Air Force fighter-interceptor operations were diminishing and the intent to scale back operations at Youngstown AFB was announced on 28 October 1959. The Ohio Air National Guard moved the 121st FBG back to Lockbourne Air Force Base on 1 March 1960.

==== 1961 Berlin Crisis ====
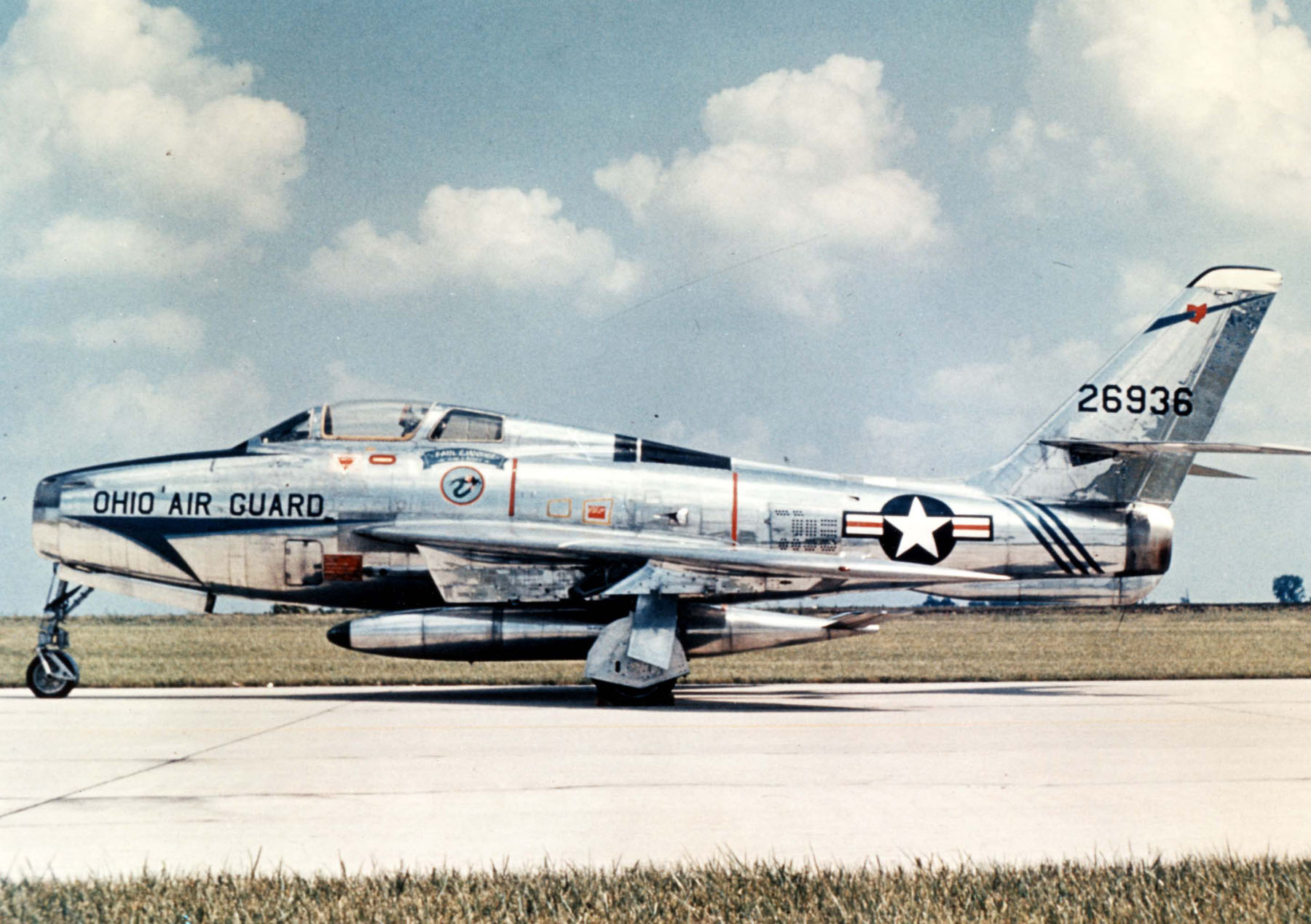
Former Ohio 166th F-84F Thunderstreak (Note: Aircraft is Republic F-84F-40-RE Thunderstreak, serial 52-6526. Today, this aircraft is on permanent exhibit at the Museum of the United States Air Force Wright-Patterson Air Force Base, Ohio.)

The 121st Tactical Fighter Wing were called to active duty for a period of twelve months on 1 October. When activated, the wing consisted of three operational units, the Ohio ANG 162d Tactical Fighter Squadron, based at Springfield Municipal Airport; the Ohio ANG 164th Tactical Fighter Squadron, based at Mansfield-Lahm Municipal Airport, and the 166th TFS.

The mission of the activated 121st TFW was to reinforce the United States Air Forces in Europe (USAFE), and deploy to Étain-Rouvres Air Base, France, a standby USAFE base. However, due to funding shortages, only 26 F-84F Thunderstreaks of 166th TFS was deployed to France, although several ground support units from the 162nd and 164th were also deployed.

On 4 November the first ANG T-33 aircraft arrived at Etain, with the F-84's arriving on 16 November. On 11 December, the deployed units of the 121st TFW were assigned to the 7121st Tactical Wing. Ground shipments of equipment and supplies arrived from Ohio during January 1962 along with additional supplies and equipment from the Chateauroux-Deols Air Depot.

The mission of the 7121st TW was tactical air support of US Army units in case of an armed conflict with the Warsaw Pact, and alert began almost immediately upon arrival. Four F-84F's were loaded with armament and maintained on alert 24/7 for continual launch preparedness. However, as the F-84 was a day fighter only, its night alert was of limited use if necessary.

Rotational deployments to the gunnery range at Wheelus Air Base were also made, where the excellent weather and ranges there provided the Air National Guard pilots an opportunity to re-qualify in air-to-air and air-to-ground weapons delivery. Weather permitting, daily missions at U S Army training ranges in West Germany were also flown to exercise with ground units there. Several ANG fighter pilots were detached as Forward Air Controllers and Air Liaison Officers to work with Seventh Army units, and additional pilots were deployed from Ohio to keep the squadron at full strength.

A NATO exchange program was conducted with the West German Air Force, with 4 F-84's being deployed to Hopsten Air Base, West Germany with an equal number of German personnel and aircraft being deployed to Etain to fly missions with the 166th. This was the first German Air Force deployment to France since the end of World War II.

In July 1962 the deployed Air National Guardsmen were no longer needed in Europe and the 7121st began to redeploy its personnel to Ohio. All the aircraft and support equipment, however, remained at Etain to equip a new wing being formed there, the 366th Tactical Fighter Wing'. The last of the ANG personnel departed on 9 August 1962.

==== Tactical air command ====
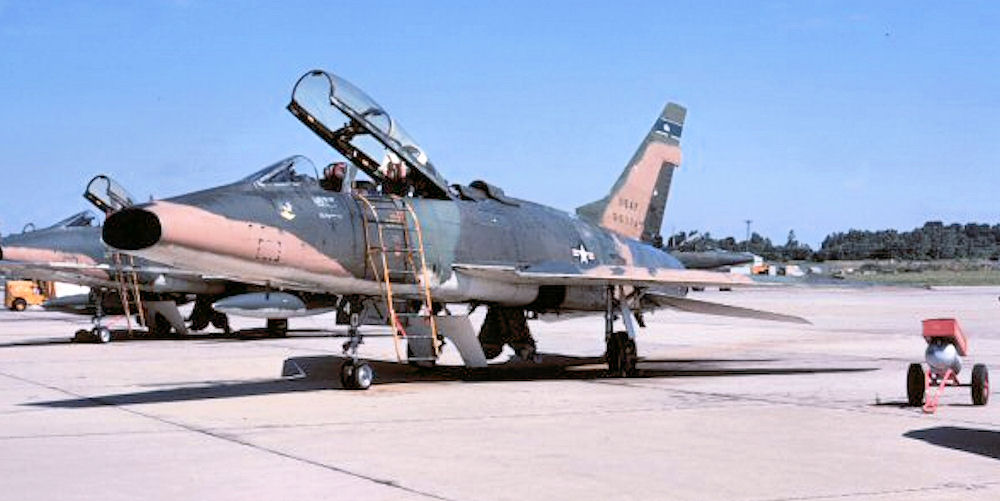
166th TFS F-100F-5-NA Super Sabre 56-3740

Having left their Thunderstreaks in France, the 166th was re-equipped with F-100C Super Sabre fighter-bombers, which greatly enhanced its mission capabilities. During the mid-1960s the squadron trained with the supersonic jet, however on 26 January 1968, in response to the USS Pueblo incident, President Johnson mobilized a major portion of the Selected Reserve Force, which included the 166th TFS.

Along with the Kansas ANG F-100C 127th Tactical Fighter Squadron, the 166th was federalized and deployed to Kunsan Air Base, South Korea. The federalized ANG squadrons were assigned as part of the 354th Tactical Fighter Wing. The squadrons flew deterrent air defense missions over South Korean airspace during the next year. During the deployment some pilots flew combat missions in South Vietnam while performing temporary assignments with other units. The performance of the ANG units at Kusan in 1968–69 suggested the prerequisites of effective air reserve programs and paved the way for adoption of the total force policy in 1970 which exists today.

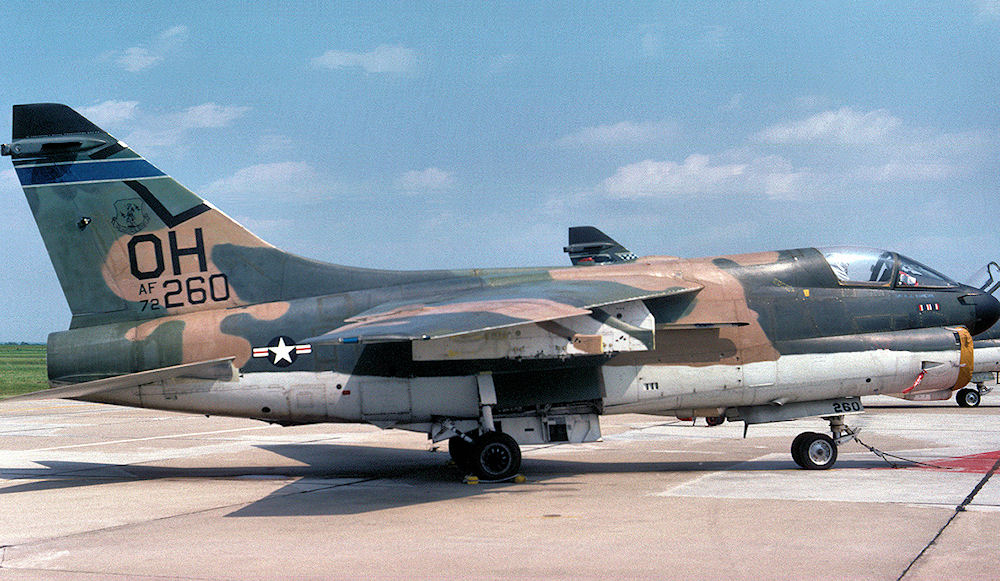
A-7D 72-260 about 1979

On 10 June 1968, the ANG squadrons returned to the United States after the men of the Pueblo were released. However, the experience of the F-100's in South Korea showed the Air Force that the F-100C was not a good air defense aircraft. The F-100s were aging and clearly unsuited to the most pressing operational responsibilities in the event of an attack by the North Koreans. In addition, the F-100's were slow in attaining altitude and lacked an effective all-weather, air-to-air combat capability, essential in Korea. In 1971 the F-100Cs were retired and replaced by F-100D/F Super Sabres, being received from combat units in South Vietnam that were returning to the United States.

In 1974 Lockbourne AFB was renamed Rickenbacker AFB in honor of Captain Eddie Rickenbacker, the World War I "Ace of Aces" and a Columbus, Ohio native. Also in 1974, under the "Total Force Policy", Guard and Reserve units began to receive newer aircraft and equipment in the 1970s. The 121st began conversion to the A-7D Corsair II in December which brought with it additional missions. Beginning in 1977, the 166th began a NATO commitment to the United States Air Forces in Europe (USAFE), and began deployments to West German and English bases exercising with NATO and USAFE units in a series of exercises. The first deployment, in May 1977 to Ingolstadt Manching Air Base, West Germany the 166th deployed 10 A-7Ds as part of "Coronet Whist". In Germany, the units A-7Ds exercised with A-7s from the PA ANG 146th TFS (Pittsburgh IAP) and West German aircraft. In July 1978, a deployment to RAF Wittering, England saw 3 A-7Ds as part of "Coronet Teal".

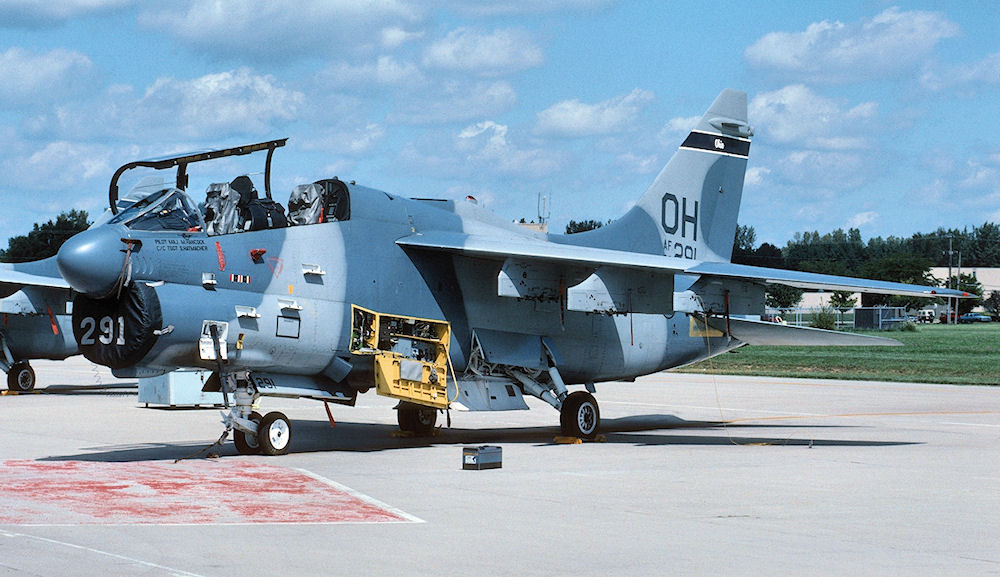
166th Tactical Fighter Squadron A-7K Corsair II Trainer 80-0291 just before its retirement about 1991.

When the active duty units departed in 1979, Rickenbacker became an Air National Guard Base with the 121st as its largest flying unit. The 1980s brought new and more demanding tasks when the 121st became part of President Jimmy Carter's Rapid Deployment Joint Task Force and was ultimately integrated into war plans as a part of United States Central Command Air Forces in the 1980s.

Training for this high priority mission was intense and included many deployments, exercises and evaluations. Additional deployments during the 1980s were Coronet Castle and Coronet Miami at RAF Sculthorpe, England, and "Creek Corsair". Cornet Fox, at Leck Air Base, West Germany in May 1986, saw the squadron stage though Lajes Air Base, Azores and RAF Mildenhall, England before arriving in West Germany A deployment in July and August 1988, to Spangdahlem Air Base, West Germany, being the last NATO deployment for the squadron with the Corsairs.

By the time of Operation Desert Shield/Desert Storm in 1990, the A-7D Corsairs were not considered front-line aircraft and the squadron was not activated. However the 121st TFW provided support for operations at home station while smaller elements and individuals served as active duty augmenters in several locations. The 121st Security Forces Squadron was activated and deployed to the Persian Gulf in November 1990. Stationed at Sheik Isa Air Base, Bahrain, it served under combat conditions, returning home in April 1991.

==== Air refueling ====
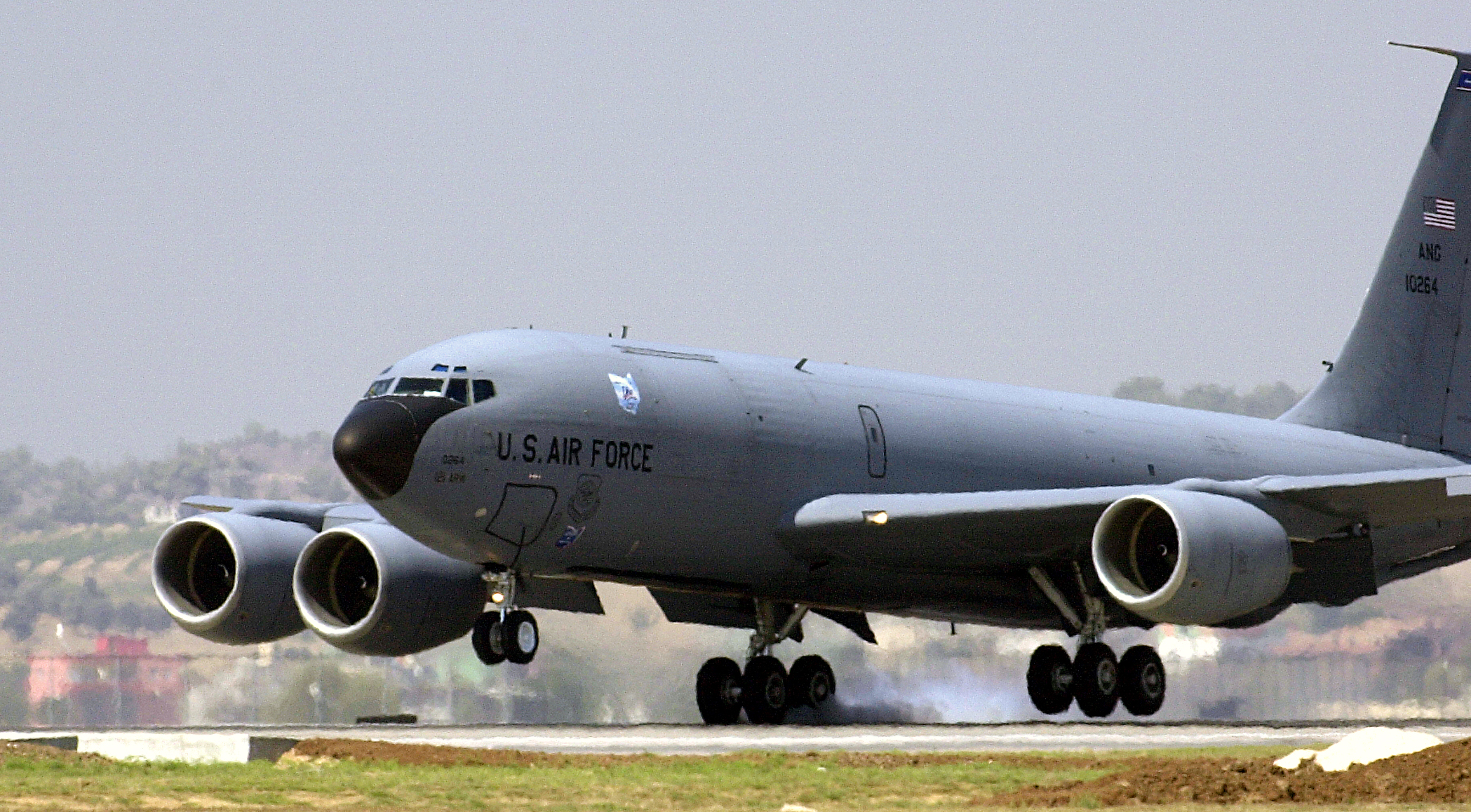
121st ARS KC-135, touches down on the flightline at Incirlik, Turkey during Operation Enduring Freedom

With the end of the Cold War, a major reorganization of the Air Force was soon underway which would bring about the most significant mission change in the history of the 121st. After 35 years of flying fighters it was to become an air refueling wing.

In 1992, the A-7D's were flown to storage at Davis-Monthan AFB, Arizona and the first KC-135R Stratotankers were received. The 121st also assumed base support responsibilities. In October 1993, the 121st Air Refueling Wing was consolidated with the 160th Air Refueling Group which was inactivated in the process. With this consolidation, the 121st became a "Super Wing" by gaining the 145th Air Refueling Squadron.

Under the 120th ARW, the squadron began flying from bases in southern France to support strike aircraft during Operation Deny Flight missions over the Balkans. The unit was a fixture at Incirlik Air Base, Turkey, as well as Prince Sultan Air Base, Saudi Arabia, supporting Operations Northern Watch and Operation Southern Watch, respectively, over Iraq.

After the terrorist attacks on 11 September 2001, the 121st Air Refueling Wing launched into immediate action supporting armed aircraft over the United States during Operation Noble Eagle. The 121st ARW had the distinction of flying more missions than any other unit during this time. The 121st ARW has also deployed and participated in Operation Enduring Freedom over Afghanistan, as well as Operation Iraqi Freedom over Iraq.

In addition to the combat deployments, the unit has also been very heavily tasked with airlift missions during national emergencies. Immediately following Hurricane Katrina in August 2005, the 121ARW was one of the first units to send aircraft into Louisiana filled with supplies and troops. Similar missions were flown in September 2005, after Hurricane Rita.

=== Lineage ===
- Constituted as the 364th Fighter Squadron and activated on 1 December 1942

Inactivated on 20 August 1946.
Redesignated 166th Fighter Squadron, Single Engine and allotted to Ohio ANG, on 21 August 1946
Extended federal recognition on 10 November 1947
Redesignated 166th Fighter Squadron, Jet on 1 March 1950
Federalized and ordered to active service on: 10 February 1951
Redesignated 166th Fighter-Interceptor Squadron on 10 February 1951
Released from active duty and returned to Ohio state control on 1 November 1952
Redesignated 166th Fighter-Bomber Squadron, 1 November 1957
Redesignated 166th Tactical Fighter Squadron on 1 September 1961
Federalized and ordered to active service on 1 October 1961
Released from active duty and returned to Ohio state control on 20 August 1962
Federalized and ordered to active service on 26 January 1968
Released from active duty and returned to Ohio state control on 18 June 1969
Redesignated 166th Air Refueling Squadron on 16 January 1993 (Note: When the squadron is the major force provider deploying as part of an Air and Space Expeditionary unit after June 1996, the deployed unit is named the 166th Expeditionary Air Refueing Squadron.)

=== Assignments ===
- 357th Fighter Group, 1 December 1942 – 20 August 1946
- 66th Fighter Wing, 10 November 1947
- 55th Fighter Wing, 7 December 1947
- 121st Fighter Group (later 122d Fighter-Interceptor Group), 26 June 1948
- 142d Fighter-Interceptor Group, 20 September 1951 – 1 November 1952
- 121st Fighter-Interceptor Group (later 121st Fighter-Bomber Group, 121st Tactical Fighter Group), 1 November 1952 (attached to 7121st Tactical Wing, 4 November 1961 – 9 August 1962)
- 354th Tactical Fighter Wing, 26 January 1968
- 121st Tactical Fighter Group, 18 June 1969
- 121st Tactical Fighter Wing (later 121st Air Refueling Wing), 1 July 1974
- 121st Operations Group, 1 October 1993 – Preset

=== Stations ===
- Hamilton Field, California, 1 December 1942
- Tonopah Army Air Field, Nevada, 6 March 1943
- Santa Rosa Army Air Field, California, 3 June 1943
- Oroville Army Air Field, California, 18 August 1943
- Casper Army Air Field, Wyoming, 7 Oct-9 Nov 1943
- RAF Raydon (AAF-157), England, 1 December 1943
- RAF Leiston (AAF-373), England, 1 February 1944
- AAF Station Neubiberg, Germany, 20 July 1945 – 20 August 1946
- Lockbourne Army Air Field (later Lockbourne Air Force Base), Ohio, 10 November 1947
- Youngstown Municipal Airport, Ohio, 31 October 1952
- Lockbourne Air Force Base, Ohio, 1 March 1960
- Étain-Rouvres Air Base, France, 4 November 1961
- Lockbourne Air Force Base, Ohio, 9 August 1962
- Kunsan Air Base, South Korea, 2 July 1968 – 14 June 1970
- Lockbourne Air Force Base, Ohio (later Rickenbacker Air Force Base, Rickenbacker Air National Guard Base), 14 June 1970 – present

=== Aircraft ===
- P-39 Airacobra, 1943
- P-51B/C/D/H/K (later F-51) Mustang, 1943–1946, 1947–1950, 1952–1954
- F-84CE Thunderjet, 1950–1952, 1955–1958
- F-80C Shooting Star, 1954–1955
- F-84F Thunderstreak, 1957–1962
- F-100C Super Sabre, 1962–1971
- F-100D/F Super Sabre, 1971–1974
- A-7D/K Corsair II, 1974–1993
- KC-135R Stratotanker, 1993–present
