= 541st Aircraft Control and Warning Group =

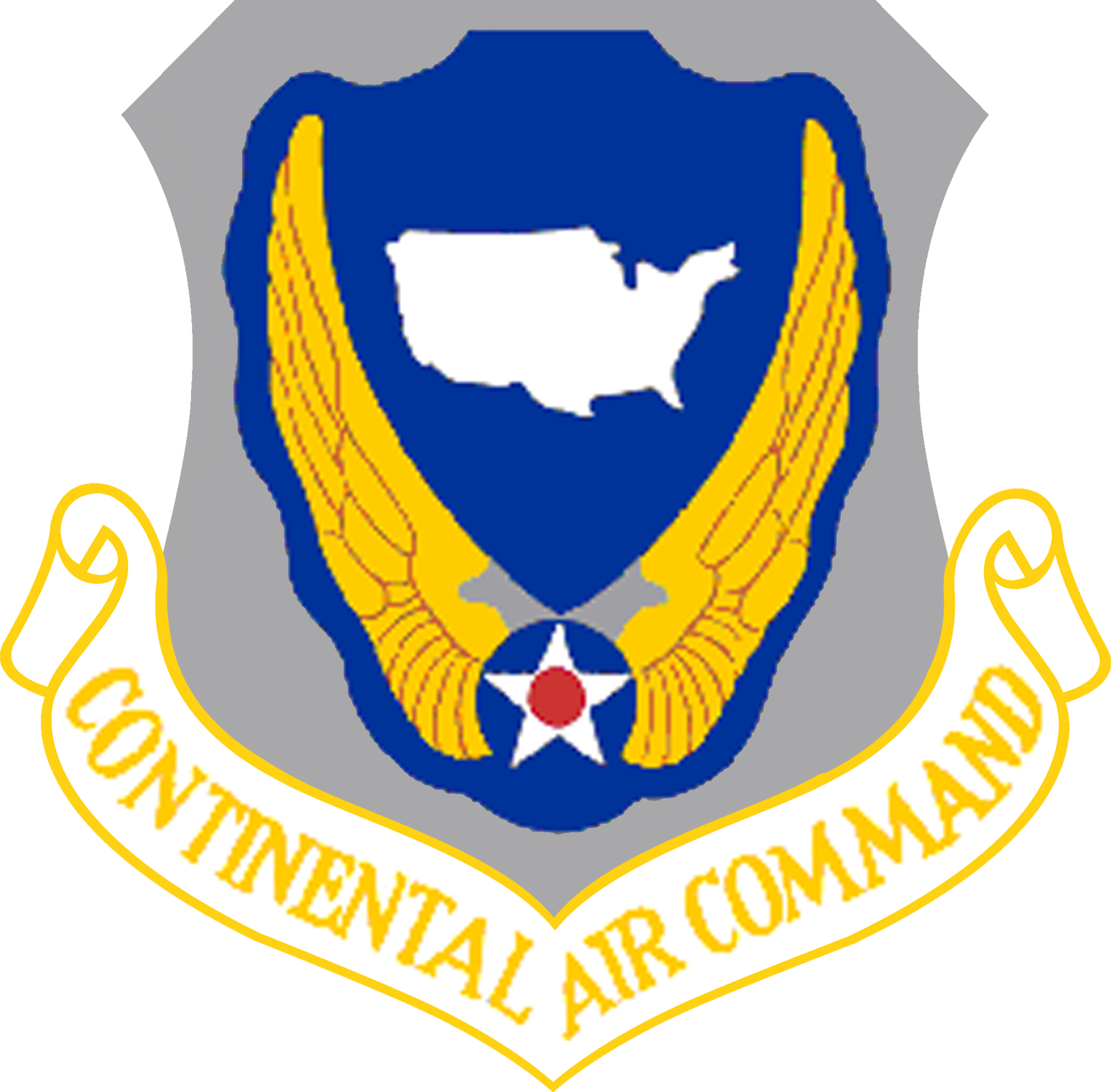
541st Aircraft Control and Warning Group
- Active: 1949-1952
- Country: United States
- Branch: United States Air Force
- Type: Command and Control
- Part of: Air Defense Command

The 541st Aircraft Control and Warning Group (AC&WG) is a disbanded United States Air Force unit. It was last assigned to the 30th Air Division, stationed at Selfridge Air Force Base, Michigan. It was inactivated on 6 February 1952 and disbanded on 21 September 1984.

This command and control organization activated on 5 December 1949, and was responsible for the organization, manning and equipping of new Aircraft Control and Warning (Radar) units. On 1 May 1950, the reserve 565th AC&WG was activated as a Corollary unit at Selfridge, sharing the 541st's equipment and facilities. The 565th was called to active duty on 2 June 1951 and was inactivated, with its personnel used as fillers for the 541st. It was inactivated in 1952 with its units being assigned directly to the 30th AD.

== Components ==
- 660th Aircraft Control and Warning Squadron

Selfridge AFB, Michigan, 5 December 1949 – 6 February 1952

- 661st Aircraft Control and Warning Squadron

Selfridge AFB, Michigan, 5 December 1949 – 6 February 1952

- 662d Aircraft Control and Warning Squadron

Brookfield AFS, Ohio, 18 April 1950 – 6 February 1952

- 663d Aircraft Control and Warning Squadron

Maryville, Tennessee, 27 November 1950 – 6 February 1952

- 664th Aircraft Control and Warning Squadron

Lockbourne AFB, Ohio, 18 April 1950 – 6 February 1952

- 665th Aircraft Control and Warning Squadron

Calumet AFS, Ohio, 27 November 1950 – 6 February 1952

- 752d Aircraft Control and Warning Squadron

Empire AFS, Michigan, 27 November 1950 – 6 February 1952

- 753d Aircraft Control and Warning Squadron

Sault Sainte Marie AFS, Michigan, 27 November 1950 – 6 February 1952

- 754th Aircraft Control and Warning Squadron

Port Austin AFS, Michigan, 27 November 1950 – 6 February 1952

- 755th Aircraft Control and Warning Squadron

Williams Bay AFS, Wisconsin, 27 November 1950 – 6 February 1952

- 781st Aircraft Control and Warning Squadron

Custer AFS, Michigan, 16 April 1951 – 6 February 1952

- 782d Aircraft Control and Warning Squadron

Rockville AFS, Indiana, 16 April 1951 – 6 February 1952

- 783d Aircraft Control and Warning Squadron

Guthrie AFS, West Virginia, 16 April 1951 – 6 February 1952

- 784th Aircraft Control and Warning Squadron

Godman Field, Kentucky, 16 April 1951 – 6 February 1952

== See also ==
- List of United States Air Force aircraft control and warning squadrons
