= Bellefontaine Air Force Station =

Former US Air Force radar station in Ohio

Bellefontaine Air Force Station
- Part of Air Defense Command (ADC)
- Bellefontaine, Ohio

Site information
- Type: Air Force Station
- Controlled by: United States Air Force

Location
- Location of Bellefontaine AFS, Ohio
- Coordinates: 40°22′20″N 083°43′10″W

Site history
- Built: 1951
- In use: 1951–1969

Garrison information
- Garrison: 664th Aircraft Control and Warning (later Radar) Squadron

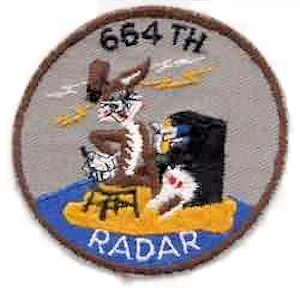
Emblem of the 664th Radar Squadron

Bellefontaine Air Force Station (ADC ID: P-73, NORAD ID: Z-73) is a closed United States Air Force General Surveillance Radar station. It is located 2.3 miles (3.7 km) east-northeast of Bellefontaine, Ohio. It was closed in 1969.

== History ==
Bellefontaine Air Force Station was one of twenty-eight stations built as part of the second segment of the Air Defense Command permanent radar network. Prompted by the start of the Korean War, on 11 July 1950, the Secretary of the Air Force asked the Secretary of Defense for approval to expedite construction of the permanent network. Receiving the Defense Secretary's approval on 21 July, the Air Force directed the Corps of Engineers to proceed with construction.

The 664th Aircraft Control and Warning Squadron was assigned to a temporary site at Lockbourne AFB (L-22) on 1 January 1951 with an AN/TPS-1B radar. In April 1952, the site at Bellefontaine became available and the squadron was moved. At Bellefontaine, the 664th turned on AN/FPS-3 and AN/FPS-4 radar sets, and initially the station functioned as a Ground-Control Intercept (GCI) and warning station. As a GCI station, the squadron's role was to guide interceptor aircraft toward unidentified intruders picked up on the unit's radar scopes. In 1958 the 664th was operating AN/FPS-20 search and AN/FPS-6 and 6A height-finder radars.

During 1959 Bellefontaine AFS joined the Semi Automatic Ground Environment (SAGE) system, initially feeding data to DC-06 at Custer Air Force Station, Michigan. After joining, the squadron was re-designated as the 655th Radar Squadron (SAGE) on 1 September 1959. The radar squadron provided information 24/7 the SAGE Direction Center where it was analyzed to determine range, direction altitude speed and whether or not aircraft were friendly or hostile. The search radar was upgraded and redesignated as an AN/FPS-66 in 1961. On 31 July 1963, the site was redesignated as NORAD ID Z-73.

In addition to the main facility, Bellefontaine AFS operated the following AN/FPS-18 Gap Filler site:

- Richland Center, Indiana (P-73J) 41°07′05″N 086°14′28″W

Located atop "Mount Nebo", the site was transferred to Bellefontaine AFS when Custer AFS, Michigan (Z-67) closed in June 1965. The gap filler was closed in June 1968.

By 1966 the site was using an AN/FPS-27. The 664th was inactivated in September 1969 due to budget reductions in ADC and the perceived low threat of an air attack on Lockbourne AFB. Today, the site had been redeveloped as the Ohio Hi-Point Career Center. Many of the former USAF buildings are still in use.

== Air Force units and assignments ==
Units:

- 664th Aircraft Control and Warning Squadron, activated on 1 January 1951 at Lockbourne AFB

Moved to Bellefontaine AFS on 1 October 1951
Re-designated 664th Radar Squadron (SAGE), 1 September 1959
Inactivated on 30 September 1969

Assignments:

- 541st Aircraft Control and Warning Group, 1 January 1951
- 30th Air Division, 6 February 1952
- 4706th Defense Wing, 16 February 1953
- 58th Air Division, 1 March 1956
- 30th Air Division, 1 September 1958
- Detroit Air Defense Sector, 1 April 1959
- 34th Air Division, 1 April 1966 – 30 September 1969

== See also ==
- United States general surveillance radar stations
