= 527th Air Defense Group =

US Air Force unit, 1945 and 1953–1955

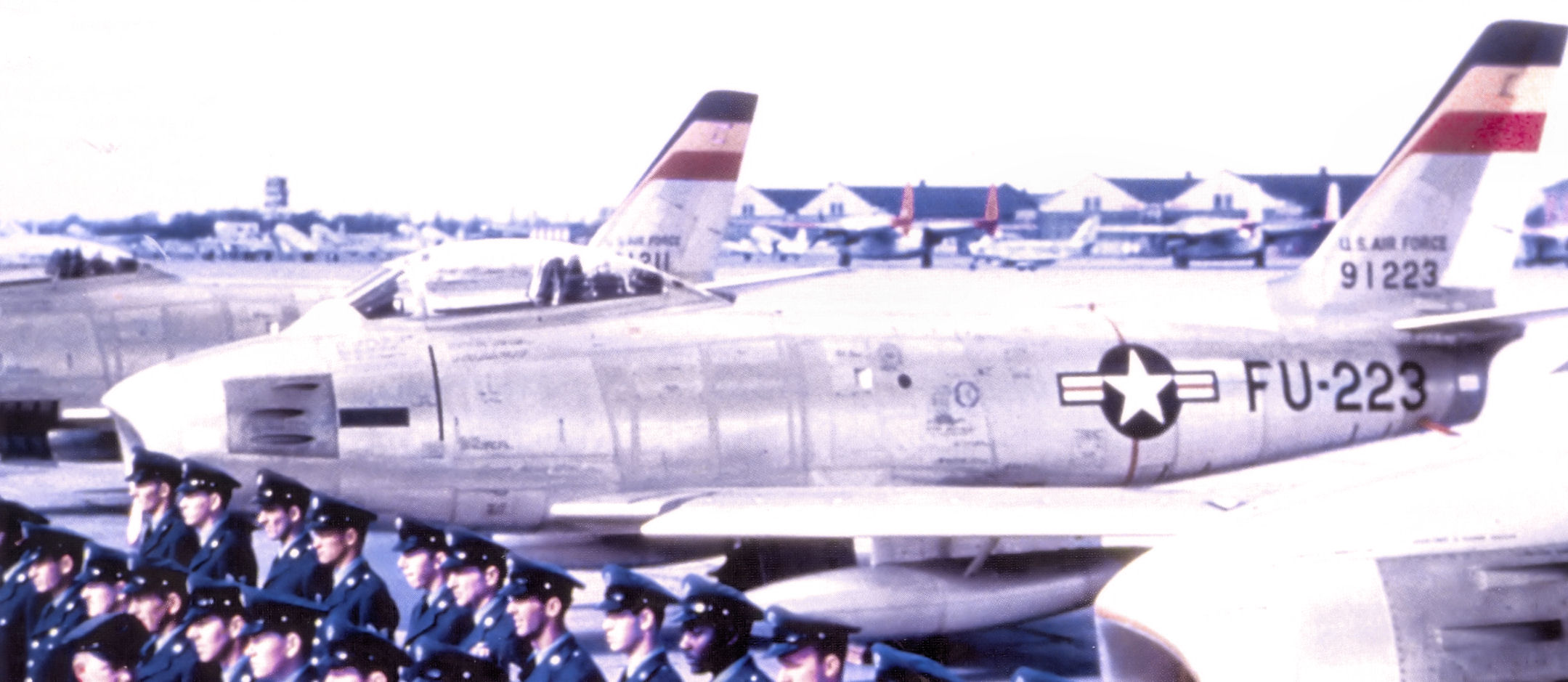
- F-86 Sabres of the 63d Fighter-Interceptor Squadron (Note: Aircraft in the foreground is North American F-86A-5-NA Sabre, serial 49-1223)
- Active: 1945; 1953–1955
- Country: United States
- Branch: United States Air Force
- Type: Fighter interceptor
- Role: Air defense

The 527th Air Defense Group is a disbanded United States Air Force organization. Its last assignment was with the 4708th Air Defense Wing at Wurtsmith Air Force Base, Michigan, where it was inactivated on 18 August 1955. The group was originally activated as the 527th Air Service Group, a support unit for the 461st Bombardment Group at the end of World War II in Italy and then redeployed to the United States where it was inactivated in 1945.

The group was activated once again in 1953, when Air Defense Command ADC established it as the headquarters for a dispersed fighter-interceptor squadron and the medical, maintenance, and administrative squadrons supporting it. It was replaced in 1955 when ADC transferred its mission, equipment, and personnel to the 412th Fighter Group in a project that replaced air defense groups commanding fighter squadrons with fighter groups with distinguished records during World War II.

== History ==
=== World War II ===
The group was activated as the 527th Air Service Group in Italy shortly after VE Day in a reorganization of Army Air Forces (AAF) support groups in which the AAF replaced service groups that included personnel from other branches of the Army and supported two combat groups with air service groups including only Air Corps units, designed to support a single combat group. Its 953rd Air Engineering Squadron provided maintenance that was beyond the capability of the combat group, its 777th Air Materiel Squadron handled all supply matters, and its Headquarters & Base Services Squadron provided other support. The group supported the 461st Bombardment Group in Italy. It returned to the US, passing through Camp Patrick Henry, Virginia, and was inactivated. It was disbanded in 1948.

=== Cold War ===
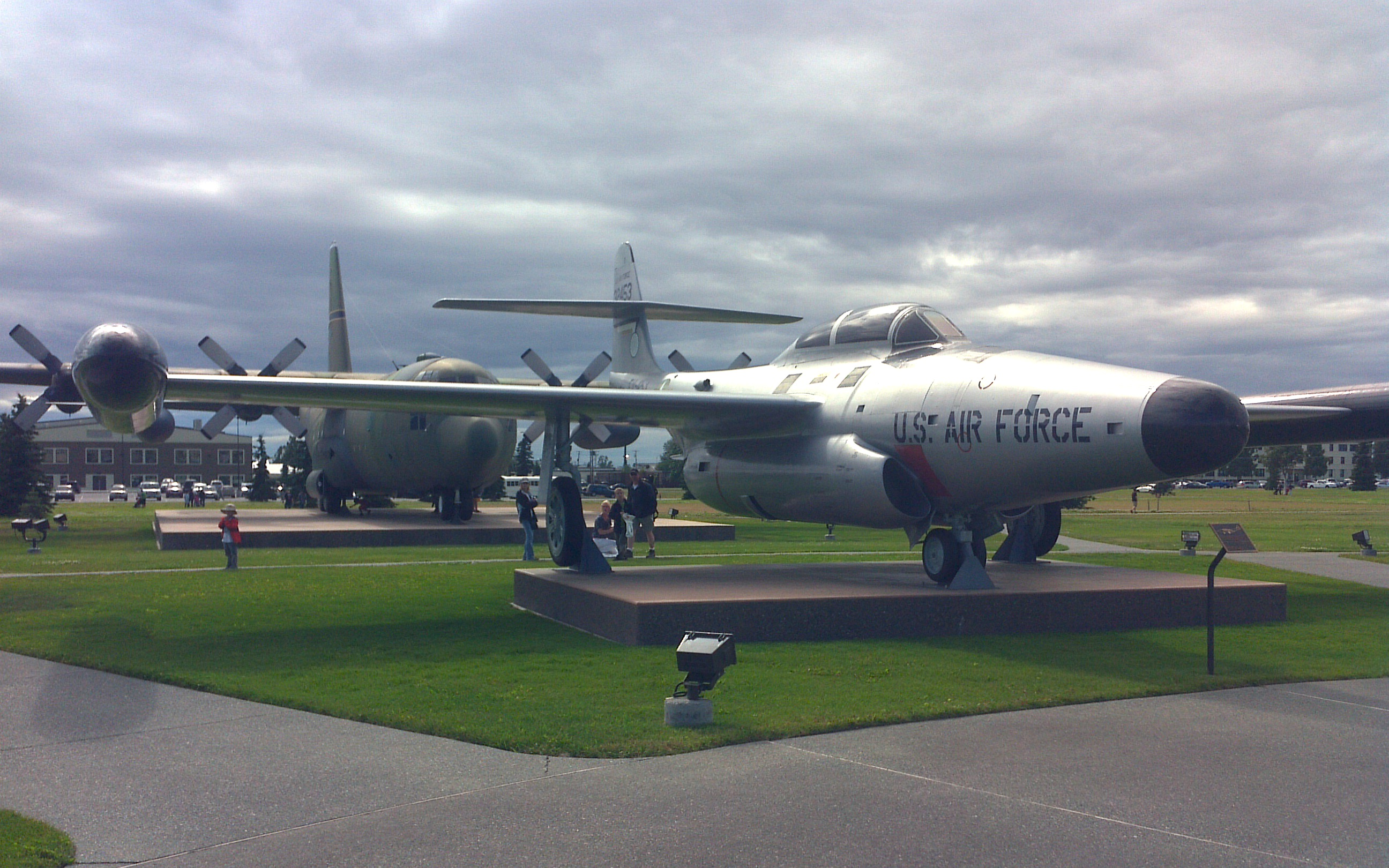
F-89 Scorpion as flown by the 63d FIS in 1955

During the Cold War, the group was reconstituted, redesignated as the 527th Air Defense Group, and activated at Wurtsmith AFB in 1953 with responsibility for air defense of the Great Lakes area. The group was assigned the 63d Fighter-Interceptor Squadron, which was already stationed at Oscoda Air Force Base, (renamed Wurtsmith Air Force Base the day before the 527th was activated), and flying North American F-86 Sabres as its operational component. The 63rd had been assigned directly to the 4706th Defense Wing. The group also replaced the 84th Air Base Squadron as USAF host unit at Wurtsmith. It was assigned three squadrons to perform its support responsibilities.

The 63d upgraded to later model Mighty Mouse rocket armed and airborne intercept radar equipped Sabres in May 1954 and to two-seat Northrop F-89 Scorpions in early 1955. The 527th was inactivated in August 1955 and replaced by the 412th Fighter Group (Air Defense) as part of Air Defense Command's Project Arrow, which was designed to bring back on the active list the fighter units which had compiled memorable records in the two world wars. The group was disbanded once again in 1984.

== Lineage ==
- Constituted as 527th Air Service Group

Activated on 27 May 1945
Disbanded on 28 August 1948

- Reconstituted and redesignated as 527th Air Defense Group on 21 January 1953

Activated on 16 February 1953
Inactivated on 18 August 1955
Disbanded on 27 September 1984

=== Assignments ===
- Unknown, 27 May 1945 – 28 August 1945 (Note: Probably Air Service Command, Mediterranean Theater of Operations.)
- 4708th Defense Wing (later 4708th Air Defense Wing), 16 February 1953 – 18 August 1955

=== Stations ===
- Santuario dell' Incoronata, Italy, 27 May 1945 – 1945
- Torretto, Italy, 1945–1945
- Sioux Falls Army Air Field, SD, 1945 – 28 August 1945
- Wurtsmith Air Force Base, Michigan, 16 February 1953 – 18 August 1955

=== Components ===
Operational Squadron

- 63d Fighter-Interceptor Squadron, 16 February 1953 – 18 August 1955

Support Units

- 527th Air Base Squadron, 16 February 1953 – 18 August 1955
- 527th Materiel Squadron, 16 February 1953 – 18 August 1955
- 527th Medical Squadron (later 527th USAF Infirmary), 16 February 1953 – 18 August 1955
- 777th Air Materiel Squadron, 27 May 1945 – 28 August 1945
- 953rd Air Engineering Squadron, 27 May 1945 – 28 August 1945

=== Aircraft ===
- North American F-86F Sabre, 1953–1954
- North American F-86D Sabre, 1954–1955
- Northrop F-89D Scorpion, 1955

== See also ==
- List of United States Air Force Aerospace Defense Command Interceptor Squadrons
- List of F-86 Sabre units
- F-89 Scorpion units of the United States Air Force
