= Port Austin Air Force Station =

Closed United States Air Force General Surveillance Radar station

Port Austin Air Force Station
- Part of Air Defense Command (ADC)

Site information
- Type: Air Force Station
- Controlled by: United States Air Force

Location
- Location of Port Austin AFS, Michigan
- Coordinates: 44°01′49″N 083°00′06″W

Site history
- Built: 1951
- In use: 1951–1988

Garrison information
- Garrison: 754th Aircraft Control and Warning (later Radar) Squadron

Port Austin Air Force Station (ADC ID: P-61, NORAD ID: Z-61) is a closed United States Air Force General Surveillance Radar station. It is located 1.2 miles (1.9 km) south-southwest Port Austin, Michigan. It was closed in 1988 by the Air Force.

After the station's closure, it was replaced by the Federal Aviation Administration (FAA) at Canton, Michigan (near Detroit) 42°16′36″N 083°28′27″W as part of the Joint Surveillance System (JSS), designated by NORAD as Eastern Air Defense Sector (EADS) Ground Equipment Facility J-62.

== History ==
Port Austin Air Force Station was one of twenty-eight stations built as part of the second segment of the Air Defense Command permanent radar network. Prompted by the start of the Korean War, on 11 July 1950, the Secretary of the Air Force asked the Secretary of Defense for approval to expedite construction of the permanent network. Receiving the Defense Secretary's approval on 21 July, the Air Force directed the Corps of Engineers to proceed with construction.

The 754th Aircraft Control and Warning Squadron was initially activated on 27 November 1950 at a temporary site at Oscoda AFB, Michigan (L-20) with an AN/TPS-1B radar. It was assigned to Port Austin in July 1951 and began operating an AN/TPS-1C. The site then joined the Permanent radar network, and the squadron began using an AN/FPS-3 set, and initially the station functioned as a Ground-Control Intercept (GCI) and warning station. As a GCI station, the squadron's role was to guide interceptor aircraft toward unidentified intruders picked up on the unit's radar scopes.

An AN/CPS-4 was added in 1954. This radar was replaced in 1957 by an AN/FPS-6 height-finder radar. A second AN/FPS-6 height-finder radar was added a year later. In 1958 this site began operating an AN/FPS-20 radar, which replaced the AN/FPS-3.

During 1959 Port Austin AFS joined the Semi Automatic Ground Environment (SAGE) system, feeding data to DC-06 at Custer AFS, Michigan. After joining, the squadron was redesignated as the 754th Radar Squadron (SAGE) on 1 September 1959. The radar squadron provided information 24/7 the SAGE Direction Center where it was analyzed to determine range, direction altitude speed and whether or not aircraft were friendly or hostile.

In early 1962 the site received and operated an AN/FPS-24 search radar, and the AN/FPS-20 was retired. On 31 July 1963, the site was redesignated as NORAD ID Z-61. In 1963 an AN/FPS-26A height-finder radar (serial # 51) was installed, and one AN/FPS-6 was removed later that year. The other AN/FPS-6 was removed in 1968.

Over the years, the equipment at the station was upgraded or modified to improve the efficiency and accuracy of the information gathered by the radars. The site came under Tactical Air Command control in October 1979 with the inactivation of Aerospace Defense Command and the transfer of the site to Air Defense, Tactical Air Command (ADTAC).

Circa 1982, the main bearing of the AN/FPS-24 search radar failed catastrophically. The FAA long-range radar site at Canton (Detroit), MI, was then used as a temporary data-tie site until an AN/FPS-91A search radar could be installed at Port Austin AFS in 1983. Also, the AN/FPS-26A was replaced by an AN/FPS-116 height-finder radar for the JSS Program. The site remained in use as an Air Force site until 30 September 1988 when it was closed altogether, again replaced by the FAA radar site at Canton.

== Air Force units and assignments ==
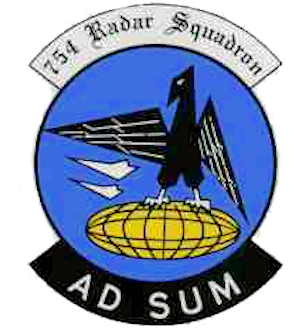
Emblem of the 754th Radar Squadron

=== Units ===
- Constituted as the 754th Aircraft Control and Warning Squadron on 14 November 1950

Activated 27 November 1950 at Oscoda AFB, MI
Moved to Port Austin AFS on 20 July 1951
Redesignated 754th Radar Squadron (SAGE) on 1 September 1959
Redesignated 754th Radar Squadron on 1 February 1974
Inactivated on 30 September 1988

=== Assignments ===
- 541st Aircraft Control and Warning Group, 1 January 1951
- 30th Air Division, 6 February 1952
- 4708th Defense Wing, 16 February 1953
- 30th Air Division, 8 July 1956
- Detroit Air Defense Sector, 1 April 1959
- 34th Air Division, 1 April 1966
- 29th Air Division, 14 November 1969
- 23d Air Division, 19 November 1969
- 21st Air Division, 1 August 1981
- 24th Air Division, 1 September 1983
- Northeast Air Defense Sector, 1 December 1987 – 1 October 1988

== See also ==
- List of United States Air Force aircraft control and warning squadrons
- United States general surveillance radar stations
