= Calumet Air Force Station =

Abandoned Aircraft Control and Warning System located near Calumet, Michigan

Calumet Air Force Station
- Part of Air Defense Command (ADC)

Site information
- Type: Air Force Station
- Code: ADC ID: P-16, NORAD ID: Z-16
- Controlled by: United States Air Force

Location
- Location of Calumet AFS, Michigan
- Coordinates: 47°22′16″N 088°10′14″W

Site history
- Built: 1951
- In use: 1951–1988

Garrison information
- Garrison: 665th Air Defense Group; 665th Aircraft Control and Warning Squadron (later 665th Radar Squadron)

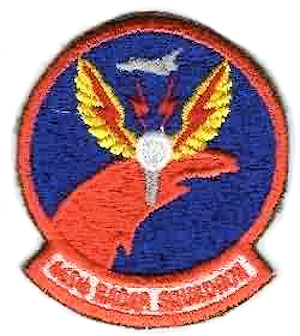
Emblem of the 665th Radar Squadron

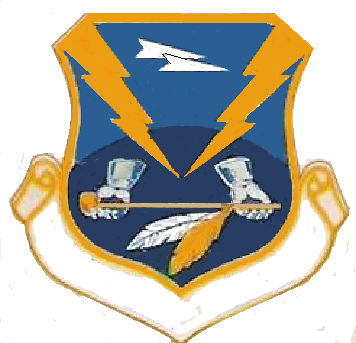
Emblem of the 665th Air Defense Group

Calumet Air Force Station is a closed United States Air Force General Surveillance Radar station. It is located 5.2 miles (8.4 km) east-northeast of Phoenix, Michigan. It was closed in 1988 by the Air Force, and turned over to the Federal Aviation Administration (FAA).

== History ==
In late 1951 Air Defense Command selected the Keweenaw, Michigan site as one of twenty-eight radar stations built as part of the second segment of the permanent radar surveillance network. Prompted by the start of the Korean War, on 11 July 1950, the Secretary of the Air Force asked the Secretary of Defense for approval to expedite construction of the second segment of the permanent network. Receiving the Defense Secretary's approval on 21 July, the Air Force directed the Corps of Engineers to proceed with construction.

On 1 May 1951 the 665th Aircraft Control and Warning Squadron began operating AN/FPS-3 and AN/FPS-5 radars at this northern Michigan site in early 1953, and initially the station functioned as a Ground-Control Intercept (GCI) and warning station. As a GCI station, the squadron's role was to guide interceptor aircraft toward unidentified intruders picked up on the unit's radar scopes. On 1 December 1953 the site was re-designated as Calumet Air Force Station.

In 1956 an AN/FPS-6 replaced the AN/FPS-5 height-finder radar. In 1958 an AN/FPS-20 search radar was deployed at Calumet. By 1961 this radar was upgraded and redesignated as an AN/FPS-64. During 1960 Calumet AFS joined the Semi Automatic Ground Environment (SAGE) system, feeding data to DC-14 at K. I. Sawyer AFB, Michigan. After joining, the squadron was re-designated as the 665th Radar Squadron (SAGE) on 15 July 1960. The radar squadron provided information 24/7 the SAGE Direction Center where it was analyzed to determine range, direction altitude speed and whether or not aircraft were friendly or hostile. On 31 July 1963, the site was redesignated as the NORAD ID Z-16.

A turn-over of equipment in 1963 left the site with an AN/FPS-27 search radar along with AN/FPS-26A and AN/FPS-90 height-finder radars. The AN/FPS-90 was removed in the late 1970s.

In addition to the main facility, Calumet operated the following AN/FPS-18 Gap Filler sites:

- Painesdale, MI (P-16A) 47°02′12″N 088°41′43″W
- Upson, WI (P-16B) 46°25′10″N 090°23′06″W

The 665th Radar Sq was inactivated and replaced by the 665th Air Defense Group in March 1970. The upgrade to group status was done because of Calumet AFS' status as a Backup Interceptor Control (BUIC) site. BUIC sites were alternate control sites in the event that SAGE Direction Centers became disabled and unable to control interceptor aircraft. The group was inactivated and replaced by the 655th Radar Squadron as defenses against crewed bombers were reduced. The group was disbanded in 1984.

Over the years, the equipment at the station was upgraded or modified to improve the efficiency and accuracy of the information gathered by the radars. Calumet came under Tactical Air Command jurisdiction in October 1979 with the inactivation of Aerospace Defense Command and the formation of ADTAC. The station then underwent cease-operations about that time, and the AN/FPS-26A height-finder radar was removed, but the site closing was soon reversed (Allegedly due to Calumet AFS being the only station to pick up a simulated air incursion). On 30 September 1988, the site finally closed permanently. Calumet was then reconfigured as an Air Force Joint Surveillance System (JSS) site, initially with only the AN/FPS-27. An AN/MPS-11 Search Radar was installed as a gap-filler during the decommissioning of the AN/FPS-27 and the commissioning of the AN/FPS-91A. An AN/FPS-91A replaced the AN/FPS-27, and later an AN/FPS-116 height-finder radar was installed.

After closure in 1988 ownership of the station was transferred to Keweenaw County, with a portion being used by the Keweenaw Academy reform school, with some facilities being used for cellular, amateur and other radio communications. As with many other closed bases, some of the facilities have become degraded due to lack of use and maintenance. In August 2021 a group of Michigan Technological University alumni purchased the facility and surrounding land with plans to remediate environmental issues and development into a tourist destination.

== Air Force units and assignments ==
=== Units ===
665th Radar Squadron

- Constituted as the 665th Aircraft Control and Warning Squadron

Activated on 27 November 1950
Redesignated 665th Radar Squadron (SAGE) on 15 July 1960
Inactivated on 1 March 1970
Redesignated 665th Radar Squadron on 1 January 1974
Activated on 17 January 1974
Inactivated on 30 September 1988

665th Air Defense Group

- Constituted as the 665th Air Defense Group on 13 February 1970

Activated on 1 March 1970
Inactivated on 17 January 1974
Disbanded on 27 September 1984

==== Commanders ====
- Major Ira E. Mason 1962?–1963
- Major Fred L. McPherson 1963–1965
- Major Roger W. Gottschall 1965–?
- Major David P. Lentz, 1 March 1970 – 1970
- Maj. James H. Bentley, 1970–unknown
- Col. John Morgan Fear 1971–1974
- Maj Robert J. Hansel, 1974-1975
- Maj James W. Clutter, 1975-1979
- Maj David Hershberger 1979–1981
- Capt/Maj Jeff Mogilewicz 1981–1983
- Lt Col Larry Dobbs, 1983–1985
- Lt Col Scott Meyer, 1985–1987 – The men and women of the base earned the Outstanding Unit Award during this time.
- Lt Col Michael Yon, 1987–1988

=== Assignments ===
- 541st Aircraft Control and Warning Group, 27 November 1950
- 30th Air Division, 6 February 1952
- 4706th Defense Wing, 16 February 1953
- 37th Air Division, 8 July 1956
- 30th Air Division, 1 April 1959
- Sault Sainte Marie Air Defense Sector, 1 April 1960
- Duluth Air Defense Sector, 1 October 1963
- 29th Air Division, 1 April 1966
- 23d Air Division, 19 November 1969
- 24th Air Division, 1 Apr 1982 – 30 September 1988

== See also ==
- List of United States Air Force aircraft control and warning squadrons
- United States general surveillance radar stations
