= 661st Radar Squadron =

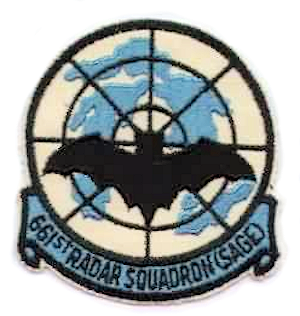
- Emblem of the 671st Radar Squadron
- Active: 1949-1974
- Country: United States
- Branch: United States Air Force
- Type: General Radar Surveillance

The 661st Radar Squadron is an inactive United States Air Force unit. It was last assigned to the 23d Air Division, Aerospace Defense Command, stationed at Selfridge Air Force Base, Michigan. It was inactivated on 1 July 1974.

The unit was a General Surveillance Radar squadron providing for the air defense of the United States.

== Lineage ==
- Activated as 661st Aircraft Control and Warning Squadron, 5 December 1949

Redesignated 661st Radar Squadron (SAGE), 1 September 1959
Redesignated 661st Radar Squadron, 1 February 1974
Inactivated on 1 July 1974

== Assignments ==
- 541st Aircraft Control and Warning Group, 1 January 1951
- 30th Air Division, 6 February 1952
- 4708th Defense Wing, 16 February 1953
- 30th Air Division, 8 July 1956
- Detroit Air Defense Sector, 1 April 1959
- 34th Air Division, 1 April 1966
- 29th Air Division, 14 November 1969
- 23d Air Division, 19 November 1969 - 1 July 1974

Stations

- Selfridge AFB, Michigan, 5 December 1949 - 1 July 1974
