= Ohio Air National Guard =

American military unit

- Ohio Air National Guard emblem
- Founded: 20 June 1927; 98 years ago
- Country: United States
- Allegiance: State of Ohio
- Branch: Air National Guard
- Type: State militia, military reserve force
- Role: "To meet state and federal mission responsibilities."
- Size: over 5,000
- Part of: Ohio National Guard; United States National Guard Bureau
- Garrison/HQ: Ohio Air National Guard, 7370 Readiness Road, Columbus, Ohio, 43217

Commanders
- Civilian leadership: President Donald Trump (Commander-in-Chief); Troy Meink (Secretary of the Air Force); Governor Mike DeWine (Governor of the State of Ohio)
- State military leadership: Major General John C. Harris Jr.

Insignia
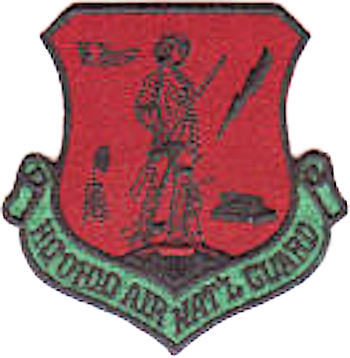
- Alternate Ohio Air Guard patch

Aircraft flown
- Fighter: F-16C Fighting Falcon
- Reconnaissance: MQ-1 Predator
- Tanker: KC-135R Stratotanker

The Ohio Air National Guard (OH ANG) is the aerial militia of the State of Ohio, United States of America. It is a reserve of the United States Air Force and along with the Ohio Army National Guard an element of the Ohio National Guard of the larger United States National Guard Bureau.

As state militia units, the units in the Ohio Air National Guard are not in the normal United States Air Force chain of command. They are under the jurisdiction of the governor of Ohio through the office of the Ohio Adjutant General unless they are federalized by order of the president of the United States. The Ohio Air National Guard is headquartered at Beightler Armory, Columbus, and its commander is Major General John C. Harris Jr.

== Overview ==
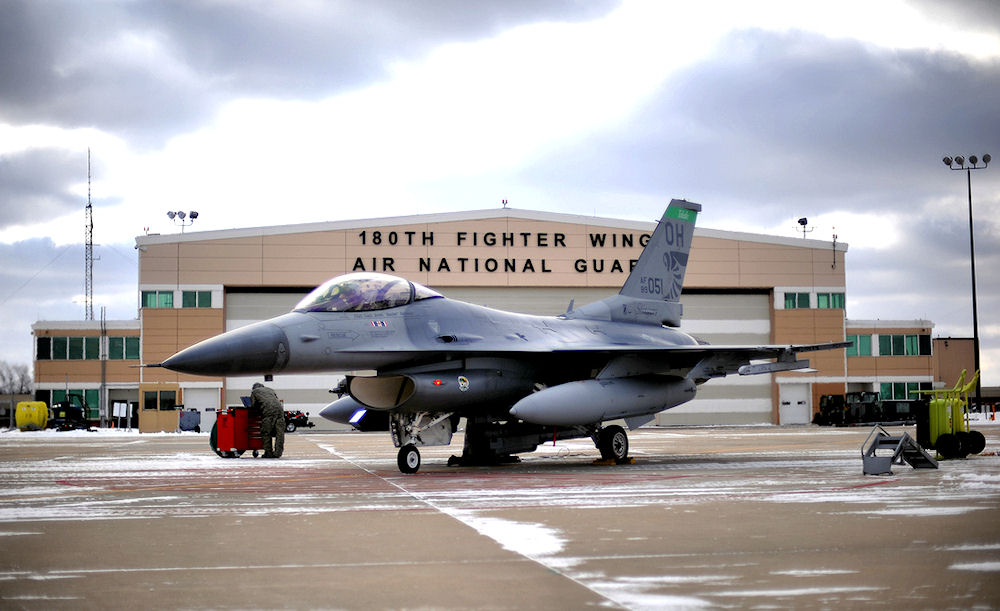
F-16C Fighting Falcon of the 112th Fighter Squadron at Toledo AGB in 2012. The 112th is the oldest unit in the Ohio Air Guard.

Under the "Total Force" concept, Ohio Air National Guard units are considered to be Air Reserve Components (ARC) of the United States Air Force (USAF). Ohio ANG units are trained and equipped by the Air Force and are operationally gained by a major command of the USAF if federalized. In addition, the Ohio Air National Guard forces are assigned to Air Expeditionary Forces and are subject to deployment tasking orders along with their active duty and Air Force Reserve counterparts in their assigned cycle deployment window.

Along with their federal reserve obligations, as state militia units the elements of the Ohio ANG are subject to being activated by order of the governor to provide protection of life and property, and preserve peace, order, and public safety. State missions include disaster relief in times of earthquakes, hurricanes, floods and forest fires, search and rescue, protection of vital public services, and support to civil defense.

== Components ==
The Ohio Air National Guard consists of the following major units:

- 121st Air Refueling Wing

Federally recognized 10 November 1947 (as: 166th Fighter Squadron); operates: KC-135R Stratotanker
Stationed at: Rickenbacker Air National Guard Base, Columbus
Gained by: Air Mobility Command
The 121st Air Refueling Wing provides the core aerial refueling capability for the U.S. Air Force and the Air National Guard. It also provides aerial refueling support to Air Force, Navy, Marine Corps, and allied nation aircraft.

- 178th Wing

Federally recognized 22 November 1947 (as: 162d Fighter Squadron); operates: MQ-1 Predator
Stationed at: Springfield Air National Guard Base, Springfield
Gained by: Air Combat Command
The 178th Wing supports MQ-1B Predator Unmanned Aerial Systems combat support sorties, which provide theater and national-level leadership with critical real-time Intelligence, Surveillance, and Reconnaissance and air-to-ground munitions and strike capability

- 179th Cyberspace Wing

Federally recognized 20 June 1948 (as: 164th Fighter Squadron), non-flying unit
Stationed at: Mansfield Lahm Regional Airport, Mansfield
Gained by: Air Combat Command
The 179th’s mission is to provide information operations and engineering infrastructure for air, space, and cyberspace military operations in support of domestic operations and multi-domain outcomes

- 180th Fighter Wing

Federally recognized 2 December 1946 (as 112th Bombardment Squadron); operates: F-16C/D Fighting Falcon
Stationed at: Toledo Air National Guard Base, Toledo
Gained by: Air Combat Command
As an F-16 unit, the primary mission of the 180th Fighter Wing is to provide combat units, combat support units, and qualified personnel to support the active-duty Air Force.

Support Unit Functions and Capabilities:

- 251st Combat Communications Group, Springfield-Beckley Municipal Airport, Springfield, Ohio
- 269th Combat Communications Squadron, Springfield-Beckley Municipal Airport
- 123rd Air Control Squadron, Blue Ash Air Station, Blue Ash, Ohio
- 200th Red Horse Squadron, Camp Perry Air National Guard Station, Port Clinton, Ohio
- 220th Engineering Installation Squadron, Zanesville Municipal Airport, Zanesville, Ohio
- 164th Weather Flight, Rickenbacker International Airport, Columbus, Ohio
- 555th Air Force Band, Air Force Band of the Great Lakes ("Triple Nickel"), Toledo Express Airport, Swanton, Ohio (inactivated 30 September 2013)

== History ==
=== Formation ===
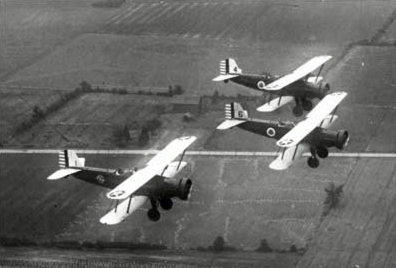
Douglas O-38s of the Ohio National Guard in flight, 1936

Aviation units of the National Guard first began operating in 1915. The state of Ohio received its first aerial unit after World War I, when the 112th Observation Squadron (consolidated with the World War I 112th Aero Squadron on 20 October 1936) was constituted in 1921 and assigned to the 37th Division, but not activated. The 112th O.S. was organized and federally recognized on 20 June 1927, at Cleveland Airport. In 1933 the unit was assigned to the 45th Observation Group, a Regular Army Inactive (RAI) unit assigned to support the V Corps in wartime. The unit was inducted into federal service on 25 November 1940, and assigned to Pope Field, North Carolina, in support of the I Corps.

One of its former members, Lt. Col. Addison E. Baker, was posthumously awarded the Medal of Honor while commanding the B-24-equipped 93rd Bomb Group during a mission against the Ploesti oil refineries on 1 August 1943. The 112th Observation Squadron continues today as the 112th Fighter Squadron, assigned to the 180th Fighter Wing in Toledo.

The Ohio Air National Guard was formed when the 357th Fighter Group, a highly decorated fighter unit in World War II, was inactivated on 20 August 1946, and its squadrons designated for assignment to the Ohio ANG. The official site of the Ohio Air National Guard notes that it is "descended from the 357th Fighter Group". The 357th Fighter Group was re-designated the 121st Fighter Group on 21 August 1946, and the 121st FG then allocated to the OHANG. In 1947, with the passage of the National Security Act of 1947 creating a separate Air Force, the Ohio Air National Guard came into being as a federally recognized reserve component. The 121st FG received its federal recognition on 26 June 1948.

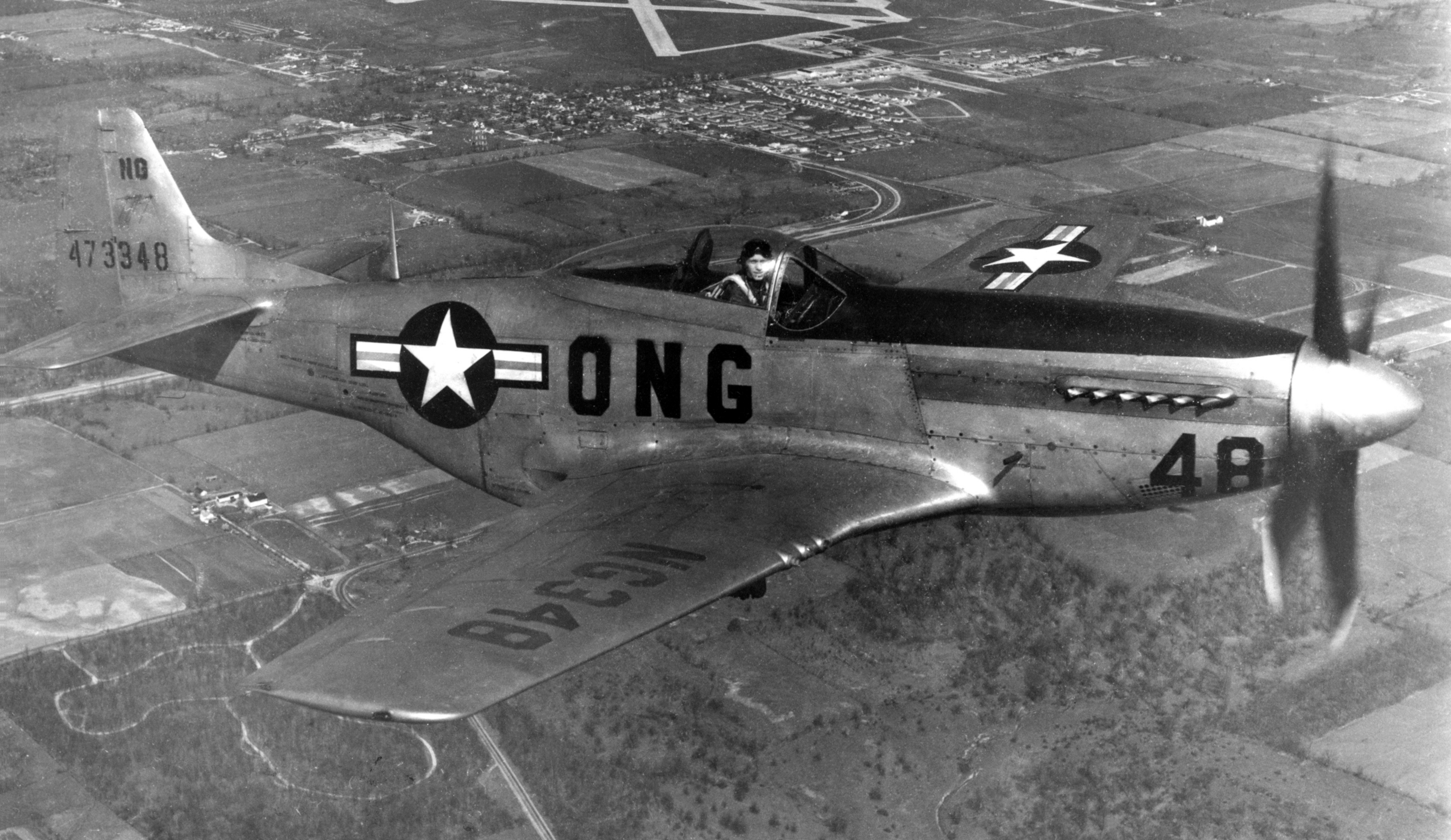
An F-51D Mustang of the 162d Fighter Squadron, 1947

The three fighter squadrons of the 357th were also re-designated as squadrons of the Ohio Air National Guard. (Subsequently, the 121st FG was inactivated.) Initially fighter squadrons flying F-84 and later F-100 and A-7 jets, these redesignated squadrons that formed the first units of the OHANG are:

- 162d Fighter Squadron (formerly the 362d FS), now an F-16 training squadron. Federally recognized on 2 November 1947.
- 164th Airlift Squadron (formerly the 363d FS), now a C-130 squadron. Federally recognized on 20 June 1948.
- 166th Air Refueling Squadron (formerly the 364th FS), now a KC-135 tanker squadron. Federally recognized on 2 March 1948.

=== Operational history ===
The 121st Fighter Wing, of which the 121st FG was initially a part, was created as the 55th Fighter Wing on 7 December 1947, to continue the history and the lineage of the 55th Bomb Wing, a B-24 outfit that saw combat in Italy during World War II.

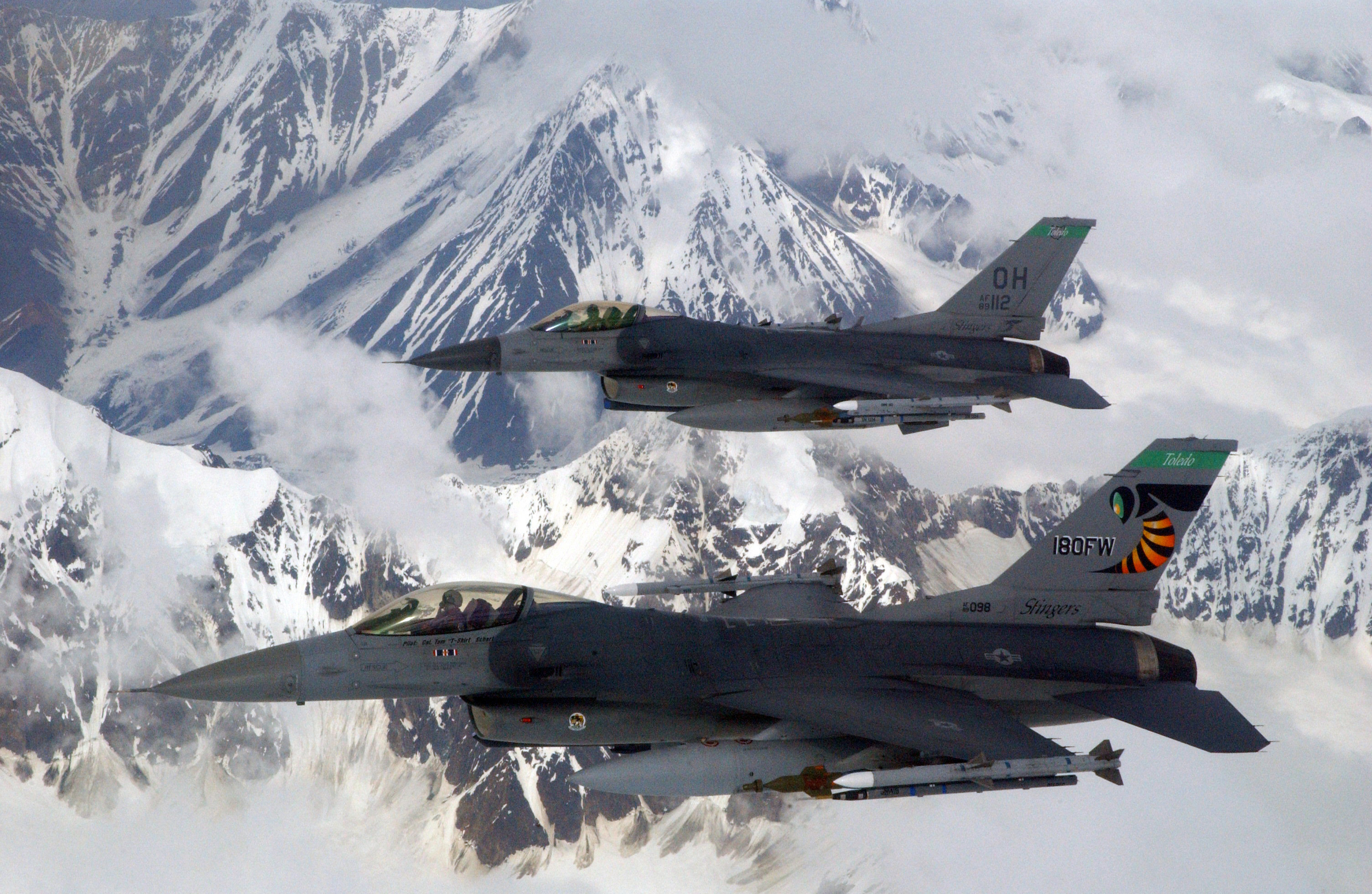
F-16Cs of the 180th Fighter Wing flying over Alaska, 2006

In November 1950 it was redesignated as the 121st Fighter Wing and equipped with the first jet aircraft to serve in the OHANG. The 121st FW was called to federal service during the Korean War, although neither it nor its squadrons saw combat. Other units saw service during the Berlin Airlift, the Vietnam War, and Operation Desert Storm.

The 160th Air Refueling Wing was assigned to the Strategic Air Command on 1 July 1976. It was initially equipped with Boeing KC-97L Stratofreighters. The unit was based at Rickenbacker AFB and equipped with Boeing KC-135s, the 160th ARW was one of 13 Air Guard refueling units assigned to SAC as part of the initial integration of Air Reserve Component units into its forces and mission. On the disbandment of SAC, the 160th Wing was reassigned to Air Mobility Command, Fifteenth Air Force on 31 May 1992, and its 160th Air Refueling Group merged with the 121st Fighter Wing to become the current 121st Air Refueling Wing. The 160th ARG was inactivated but its 145th ARS continues as a unit of the 121st ARW today. The Major Command assignment of the 121st ARW is the Air Mobility Command.

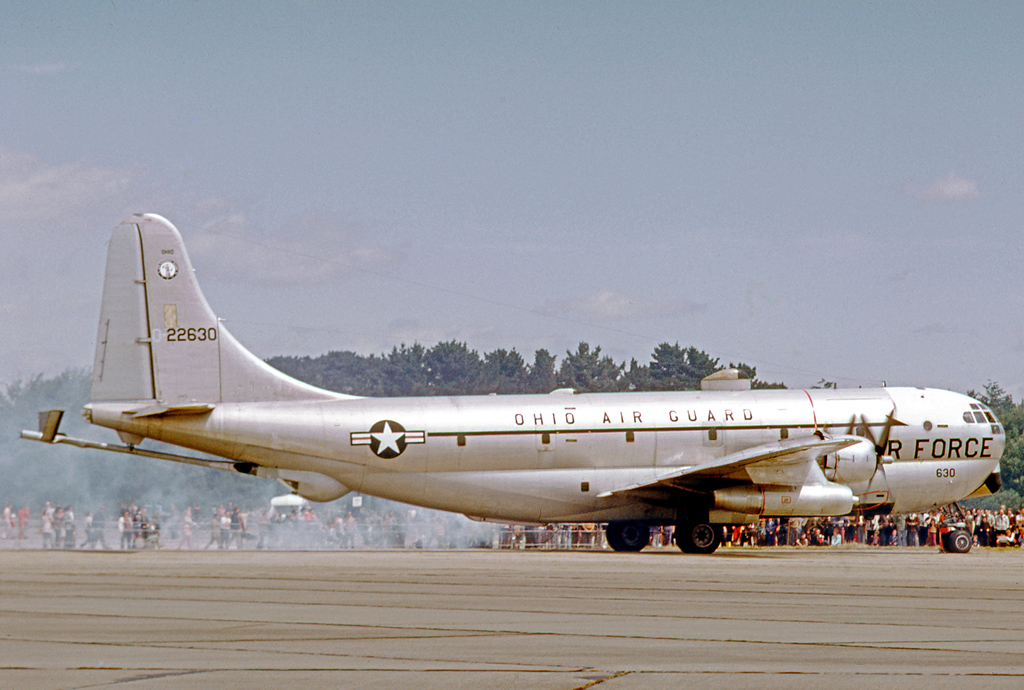
A Boeing KC-97L Stratofreighter of the 160th Air Refueling Wing, 1974

The 178th Tactical Fighter Group was formed on 15 October 1962, from the 162nd Tactical Fighter Squadron and its supporting units after serving on active duty in response to the 1961 Berlin Crisis. In 1993 it also transitioned from A-7 Corsair fighter bombers to F-16s and became the 178th Fighter Wing. The Major Command assignment of the 178th FW is the Air Education and Training Command. The 178th is currently a Fighter Training Unit and the mission since 2007 has been a Foreign Sales Mission. The 178th engages in full scale training of the Royal Netherlands Air Force under the FSM. This mission is scheduled through 2010.

The 179th Tactical Fighter Group was formed out of the 164th TFS on 19 October 1962, after its release from federal service. Initially equipped with F-84s, the group converted to C-130 Hercules airlifters in January 1976 and became the 179th Tactical Airlift Group. It underwent its most current redesignation on 1 October 1995, when it became the 179th Airlift Wing.

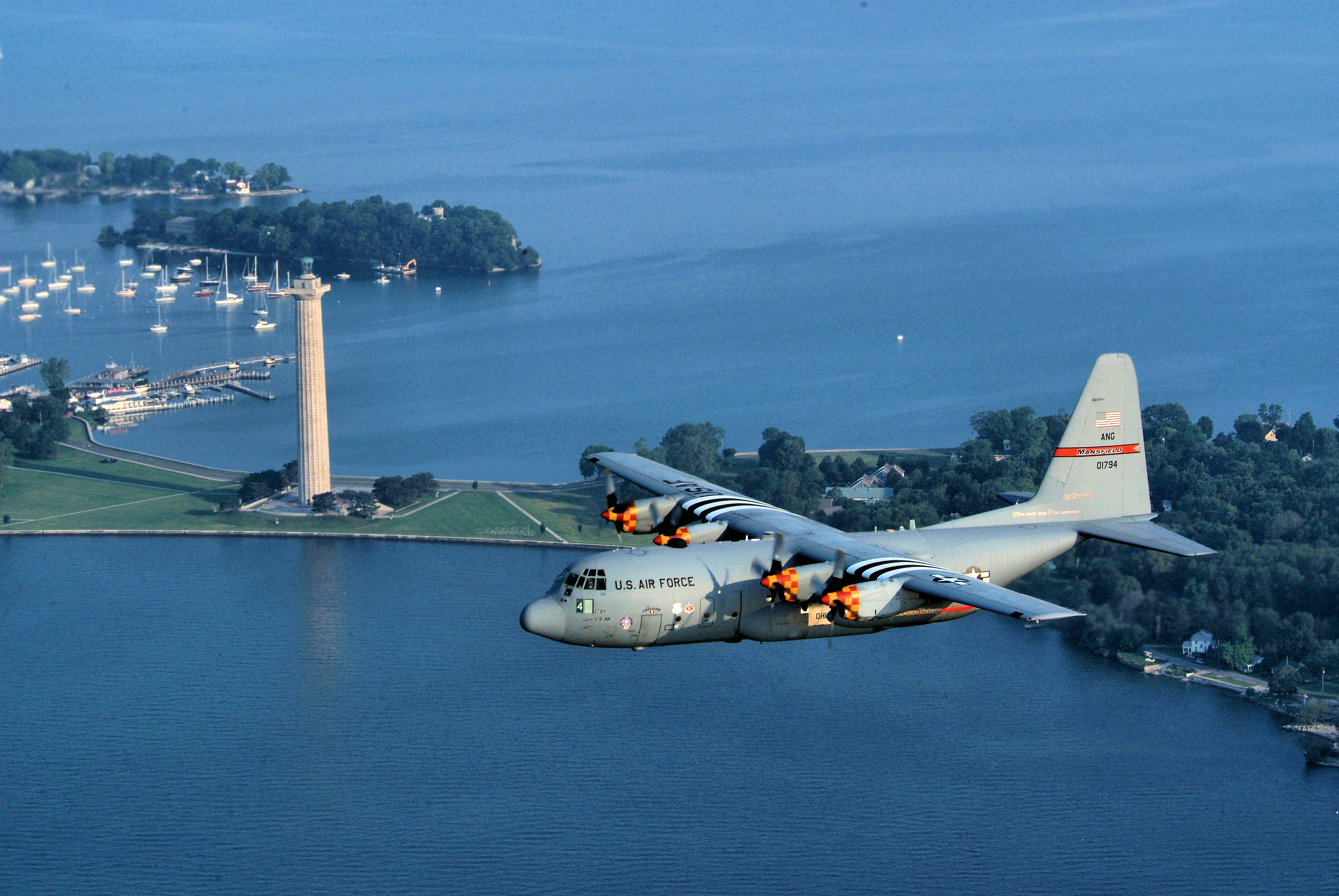
A C-130H Hercules of the 179th Airlift Wing

The 179th is currently re-equipping with the C-27 Spartan tactical airlifter with planned initial operational capability delayed until 2011, and a deployment to Afghanistan originally scheduled for March 2011 delayed four months. The Major Command assignment of the 179th AW is the Air Mobility Command.

The 180th Tactical Fighter Group was formed in October 1962 flying F-84 Thunderstreak fighter bombers, shortly after its release from federal service. It later converted to F-100 Super Sabres and A-7s, and participated in Operation Just Cause in 1989. In 1993 it acquired F-16 fighters and became the 180th Fighter Wing. The Major Command assignment of the 180th FW is the Air Combat Command.

The Ohio Air National Guard participated in a joint state-federal mission as part of the Global War on Terror. F-16 and C-130 aircraft of all OHANG units display the tail code "OH". In 2005 the 179th Airlift Wing, 121st Air Refueling Wing, 180th Fighter Wing, 178th Fighter Wing, 200th Red Horse Squadron, 251st Combat Communications Group, 269th combat Communications Squadron, 123rd Air Control Squadron were deployed in response to Hurricane Katrina.

== See also ==
- Ohio Military Reserve
- Ohio Naval Militia
- Ohio Wing Civil Air Patrol
