= National Advanced Air Mobility Center of Excellence =

Research facility

Coordinates: 39.8440°N 83.8453°W

The National Advanced Air Mobility Center of Excellence is a research facility dedicated to studying air mobility and Unmanned Aircraft Systems (UAS). It contains 30,000 square feet of administrative, laboratory, meeting, and collaboration space with an additional 25,000 square feet of aircraft hangar space. The facility is located at the Springfield–Beckley Municipal Airport, which is close by to Wright-Patterson Air Force Base.

The facility is designed to facilitate collaboration between the United States Air Force Research Laboratory, the Ohio Unmanned Aircraft Systems Center, NASA, private companies, and academic sources such as local colleges and universities.

== Uses ==
The National Advanced Air Mobility Center of Excellence is used for activities like testing electric vertical takeoff and landing (eVTOL) and high-speed VTOL aircraft. It is also used by the Federal Aviation Administration to study and collect data on UAS activities.

South Korean aircraft developer PLANA leases space at the facility to accelerate its Research and Development work and to partner with the State of Ohio by using resources available at the National Advanced Air Mobility Center of Excellence. The Toray Group also uses space at the center to research material uses in UAS aircraft. Jaunt Air Mobility, Whisper, Horizon Aircraft, and Bell Textron all have contract to conduct research and testing at the facility.

One of the primary goals of the center is to revolutionize automation that will allow aircraft to transport passengers or cargo at low altitudes to urban and suburban areas.

The facility is also home to companies that develop technology for UAS operators and even helicopter pilots. The Springfield Airport also hosts eVTOL simulators to train crewmembers to operate the aircraft.

Hartzell Propeller also works closely with companies at the center.

== History ==
=== eVTOL Presence in Springfield ===
The Springfield–Beckley Municipal Airport already hosted drone and UAS testing before the establishment of the National Advanced Air Mobility Center of Excellence. The 178th Wing, already long established at the airport, played a role in such testing, along with Beta Technologies, Joby Aviation, and LIFT Aircraft. The airport is also home to a ground-based system that provides UAS operators real-time aircraft display data.

Springfield's airport already had an area dedicated exclusively to eVTOL businesses due to the businesses' large presence.

=== Government Advocacy ===
The idea for an Air Mobility Center in Ohio was proposed in federal government as early as 2018. Initial proposals were rejected because government agencies wanted to pursue other locations for the facility. However, Ohio congressman Mike Turner pushed to change the funding criteria for the facility in order to secure it for Ohio.

In 2021, Ohio Senator Sherrod Brown petitioned Defense Secretary Lloyd Austin to open the facility in Springfield.

The facility was funded by $9 million in grants from the United States Department of Defense, JobsOhio, and the city of Springfield, Ohio. The facility received funding from the Defense Community Infrastructure Pilot Program in 2021.

=== Facility construction and opening ===
The National Advanced Air Mobility Center of Excellence's groundbreaking occurred during the Advanced Air Mobility Forum in 2022. The center began a close relationship with the Clark State Community College, which hosted the forum.

The facility officially opened in September 2023. The official opening ceremony was coordinated with an announcement that Joby Aviation would build a new eVTOL manufacturing facility in Dayton, Ohio.

The National Advanced Air Mobility Center of Excellence's opening played a significant role in Springfield–Beckley Municipal Airport's selection as 2023 Ohio Airport of the Year.
