= 162nd Attack Squadron =

162nd Attack Squadron

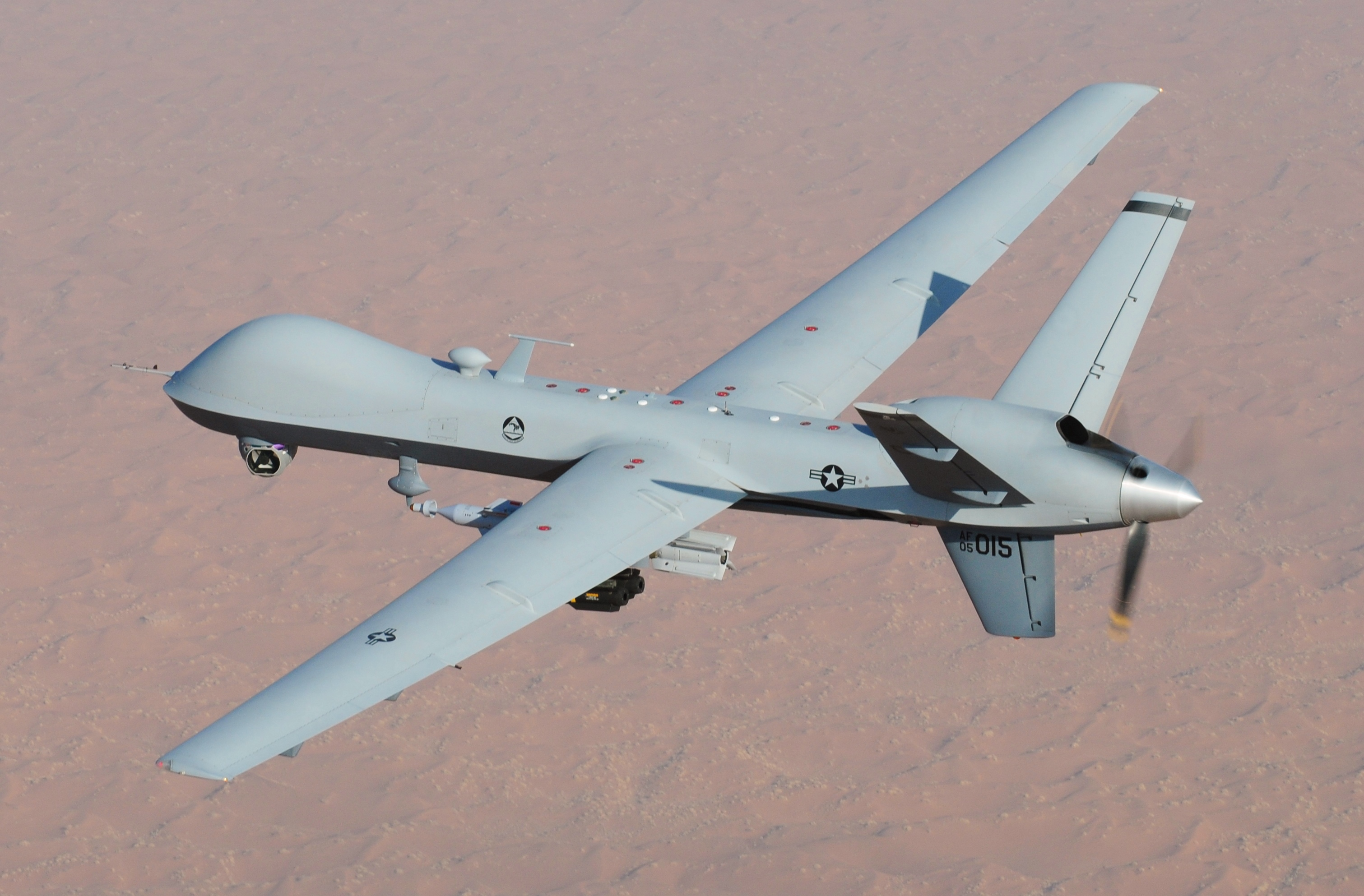
- General Atomics MQ-9 Reaper
- Active: 1942–1946; 1947–present
- Country: United States
- Allegiance: Ohio
- Branch: Air National Guard
- Type: Squadron
- Role: Unmanned Attack
- Part of: Ohio Air National Guard
- Garrison/HQ: Springfield Air National Guard Base, Ohio
- Decorations: Distinguished Unit Citation

Insignia
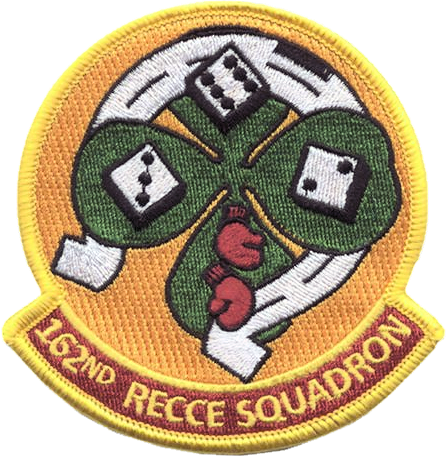
- 162nd Attack Squadron emblem

The 162nd Attack Squadron is a unit of the Ohio Air National Guard 178th Wing located at Springfield Air National Guard Base, Springfield, Ohio. The 162nd is equipped with the General Atomics MQ-9 Reaper UAV.

== History ==
=== World War II ===
The 362nd Fighter Squadron was established at Hamilton Field, California in December 1942.

Became part of the United States Air Forces in Europe army of occupation in Germany during 1945. Inactivated in Germany during August 1946.

=== Ohio Air National Guard ===
The 362nd Fighter Squadron was redesignated the 162nd Fighter Squadron, and was allotted to the National Guard on 24 May 1946. It was organized at Cox-Dayton Municipal Airport, Ohio, and was extended federal recognition on 22 November 1947 by the National Guard Bureau. The 162d Fighter Squadron was assigned initially to the Illinois ANG 66th Fighter Wing, operationally gained by Continental Air Command. On 7 December 1947 the Ohio ANG 55th Fighter Wing, was federally recognized and the squadron was transferred.

==== Air Defense ====
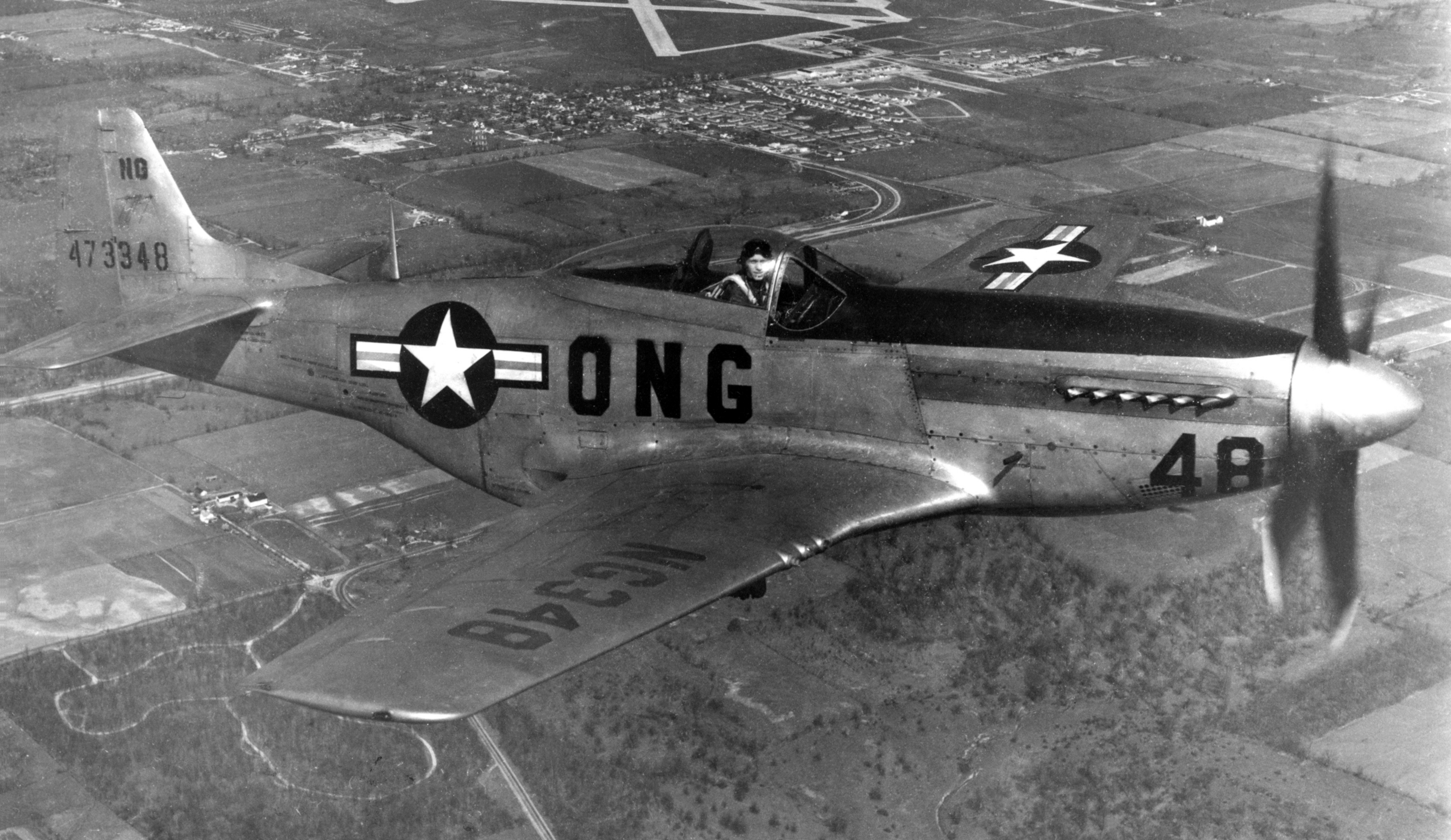
A 162nd FS F-51D Mustang (post-war)

With the formation and federal recognition of the Ohio ANG 121st Fighter Group at Lockbourne Field, near Columbus, the squadron was reassigned. The mission of the 162nd Fighter Squadron was the air defense of Ohio. Parts were no problem and many of the maintenance personnel were World War II veterans so readiness was quite high and the planes were often much better maintained than their USAF counterparts. In some ways, the postwar Air National Guard was almost like a flying country club and a pilot could often show up at the field, check out an aircraft and go flying. However, the unit also had regular military exercises that kept up proficiency and in gunnery and bombing contests they would often score at least as well or better than active-duty USAF units, given the fact that most ANG pilots were World War II combat veterans. In 1950 the squadron exchanged its F-51Ds for F-51H Mustang very long range escort fighters that were suitable for long-range interception of unknown aircraft identified by Ground Control Interceptor radar stations.

With the surprise invasion of South Korea on 25 June 1950, and the regular military's lack of readiness, most of the Air National Guard was federalized placed on active duty. However, the 162nd was not federalized and remained at Cox-Dayton Municipal Airport and continued its air defense mission.

In September 1955 Air Defense Command wanted to re-equip the squadron from F-51Hs to jet-powered Republic F-84E Thunderjets in accordance with the USAF directive to phase out propeller-driven fighter-interceptor aircraft from the inventory. However, because the runways at the Cox-Dayton Municipal Airport were too short at that time to support jet fighter operations, the National Guard Bureau approved the relocation request by the Ohio ANG to move the squadron to Springfield Municipal Airport, just east of Dayton.

With new facilities under construction at Springfield, the 162nd Fighter-Interceptor Squadron conducted its transition training from temporary facilities at Wright-Patterson Air Force Base. The F-84E Thunderjets were Korean War veteran aircraft and the squadron received training in the equipment from the Ohio ANG 164th and 166th Tactical Fighter Squadrons.

==== Tactical Air Command ====
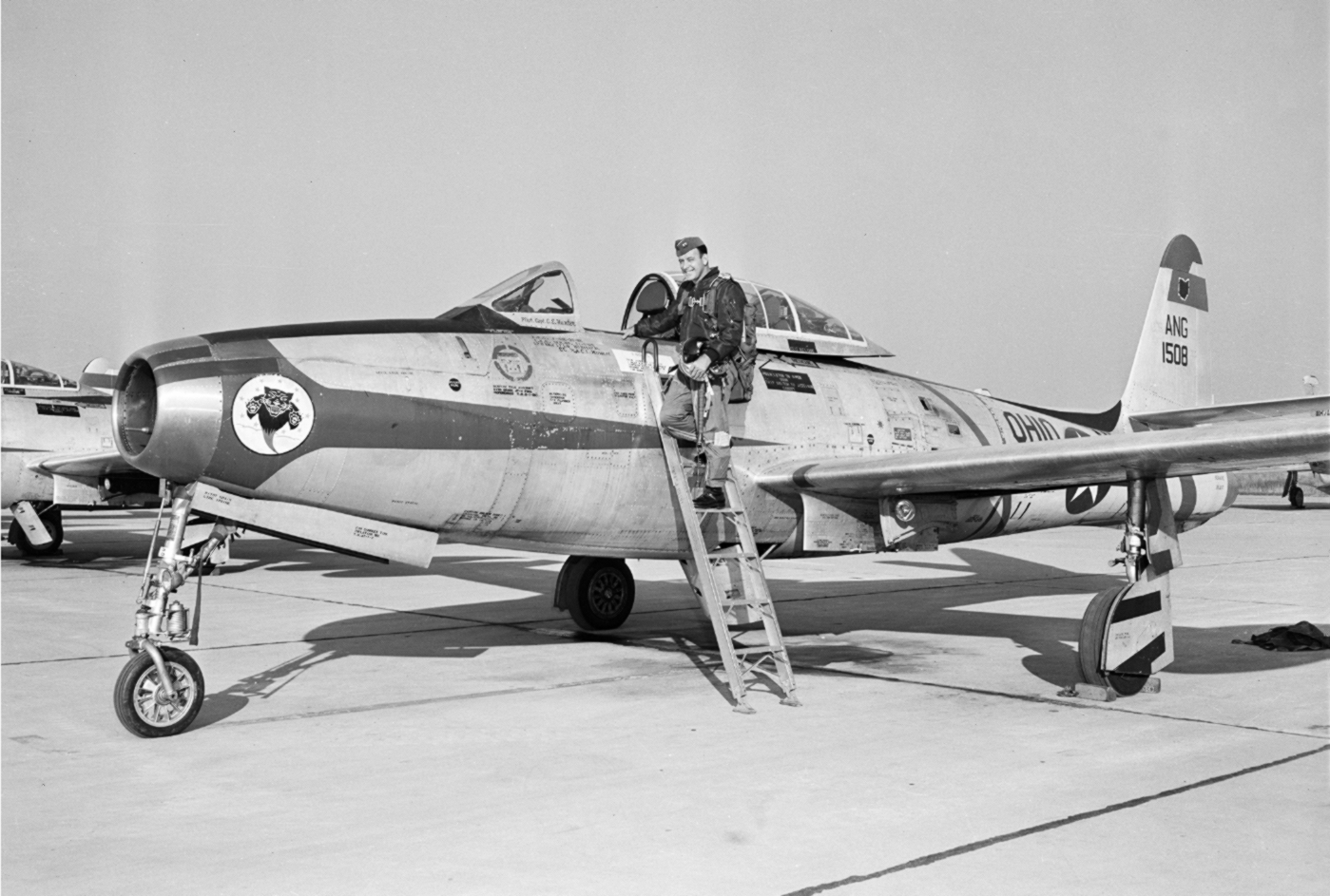
The 162nd FS flew the F-84E Thunderjet from 1955 to 1957

In November 1957 the squadron received new Republic F-84F Thunderstreak jet fighters and the squadron was redesignated the 162nd Fighter-Interceptor Squadron (Day) (Special Delivery). This designation reflected a dual mission which the squadron was tasked. The day interceptor mission of Air Defense Command, and a tactical nuclear weapon delivery mission by Tactical Air Command. Although the 162nd trained for the delivery of tactical nuclear weapons, it never had any actual nuclear weapons on hand, nor did the base at Springfield ever had nuclear weapon storage facilities.

On 10 November 1958, the squadron was redesignated the 162nd Tactical Fighter Squadron and the squadron ended its attachment to Air Defense Command, returning to Tactical Air Command control. In 1959 and 1960 the squadron participated in exercises Dark Cloud and Pine Cone III, the latter taking place at Congaree Air Force Base, South Carolina. In the exercises, the squadron practiced delivery of tactical nuclear weapons in the fictitious country of "North Saladia".

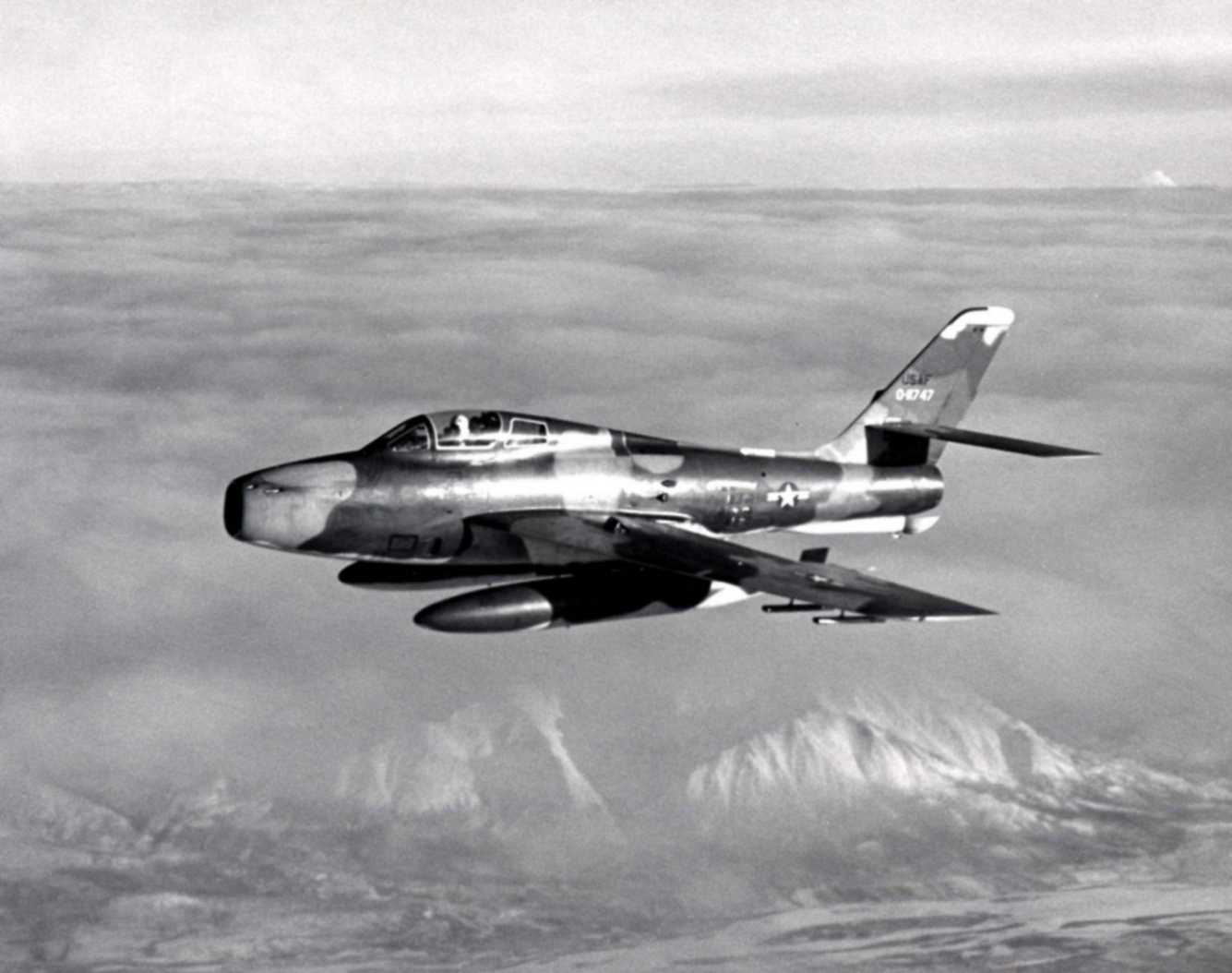
162nd Tactical Fighter SquadronF-84F Thunderstreak (Note: Aircraft is F-84F-25-RE Thunderstreak, serial 51-1747 during Operation Punchcard IV, November 1968.)

During the 1961 Berlin Crisis, the 162nd was federalized as part of the 121st Tactical Fighter Wing and Group for a period of twelve months beginning on 1 October. When activated, the 121st TFW consisted of three operational units, the 164th Tactical Fighter Squadron, based at Mansfield Lahm Regional Airport, Ohio; the 166th Tactical Fighter Squadron based at Lockbourne Air Force Base, Ohio, and the 162nd. However, due to funding shortages, only 26 F-84F's of 166th TFS were deployed to Étain-Rouvres Air Base, France, although several ground support units from the 162nd and 164th were also deployed. The squadron, however, remained under Federal USAF control until the crisis ended and it was returned to Ohio state control on 31 August 1962.

After the Berlin federalization ended, 15 October 1962, the 162nd was authorized to expand to a group level, and the 178th Tactical Fighter Group was established. The 162nd became the group's flying squadron. Other elements assigned into the group were the 178th headquarters, 178th Material Squadron (maintenance and supply), 178th Combat Support Squadron, and the 178th Tactical Dispensary.

In 1967, the 162nd deployed to Hickam Air Force Base, Hawaii for Tropic Lighting III, an exercise designed to assist in the training of Army ground units prior to their deployment to South Vietnam. This deployment required two over-water air refuelings in either direction.

1968 was the first time the 162nd participated in a North Atlantic Treaty Organization (NATO) exercise. It deployed to Greece, participating in Operation Deep Furrow 68 at Larrossa Air Base. On this exercise fourteen F-84Fs were deployed, staging though Lajes Field, Azores and Torrejon Air Base, Spain. During Deep Furrow, they performed air-to-ground maneuvers with the United States Navy's Sixth Fleet. Upon their return, the 162nd TFS deployed eight aircraft to Alaska in November for Operation Punch Card IV.

===== F-100 Super Sabre =====
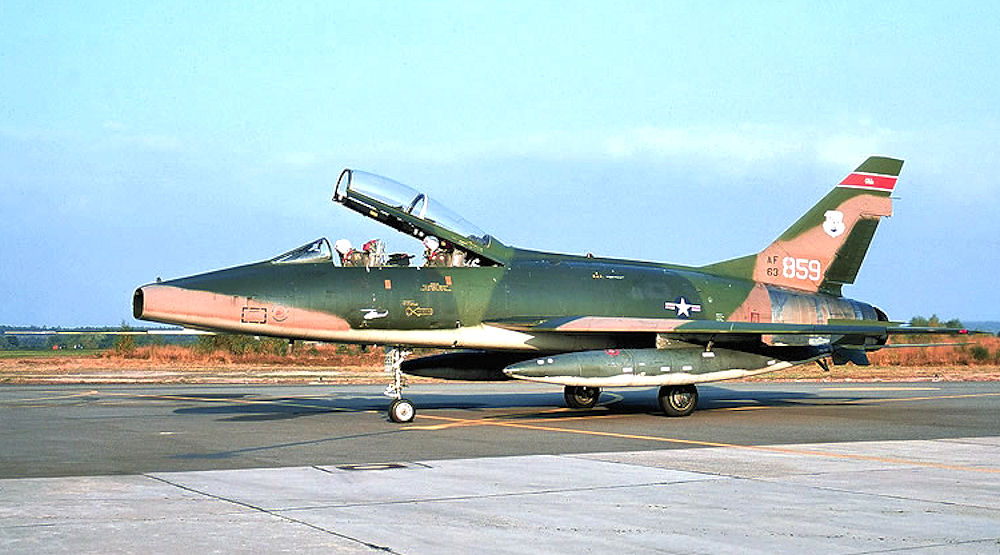
162nd Tactical Fighter Squadron – North American F-100F Super Sabre 56-3859 about 1975

In the spring of 1970, the F-84F Thunderstreaks were sent to Davis-Monthan Air Force Base for storage, the squadron receiving Vietnam War veteran North American F-100D/F Super Sabres. Concentration on the qualifications of aircrews, munitions load crews and the attainment of a C-3 combat readiness rating were the primary objectives for 1971. The squadron achieved C-3 on 30 August, a "first" for F-100D-equipped Air Guard units. January 1972 saw the squadron in extensive practice for their pending Ninth Air Force Operational Readiness Inspection (ORI). The ORI was conducted in March and the 9th Air Force did not agree with the unit's C-3 rating. A retake was scheduled in June, with the 162nd coming away with the TAC-confirmed rating of C-1, the first F-100D squadron to achieve this feat.

During April 1973, the squadron participated in Gallant Hand 73, a large-scale U.S. Readiness Command Joint Forces Training exercise at Fort Hood, Texas. Flying a 98 percent sortie rate. In August, the 162nd took part in another joint training exercise called Operation Ember Dawn/Punch Card XIX at Eielson Air Force Base, Alaska. In October, the TAC Unit Achievement Award was received for the fourth consecutive time, and the General Frank P. Lahm Air Safety Trophy was awarded for the second consecutive year.

31 May 1974 saw the 162nd's accident-free flying streak end at 69 months when a pilot was forced to eject from his out-of-control F-100D. The unit participated in "Sentry Guard Strike V" at Volk Field, Wisconsin during 13–27 July the same year. In September 1975, the 162nd was selected as a replacement for another unit to participate in NATO's Reforger 75 Cornet Razor exercise at Ramstein Air Base, West Germany as part of a series of NATO exercises called "Autumn Forge." Deploying thirteen F-100D aircraft, 162nd pilots provided close air support as the aggressor in exercise "Captain Trek," flying 121 sorties with 198 hours of flying time.

January 1976 saw the unit preparing for Operation Snowbird and the pending April ORI. "Snowbird" was conducted at Davis-Monthan AFB, Arizona. and was designed to give pilots favorable weather locations for clear weather flying opportunities. To provide its pilots with proficiency for real combat conditions, the 162nd took part in "Red Flag 77-9." Captain Edward J. Mechenbier, a former Vietnam War POW, was selected as the outstanding fighter pilot for 1977.

===== A-7D Corsair II =====
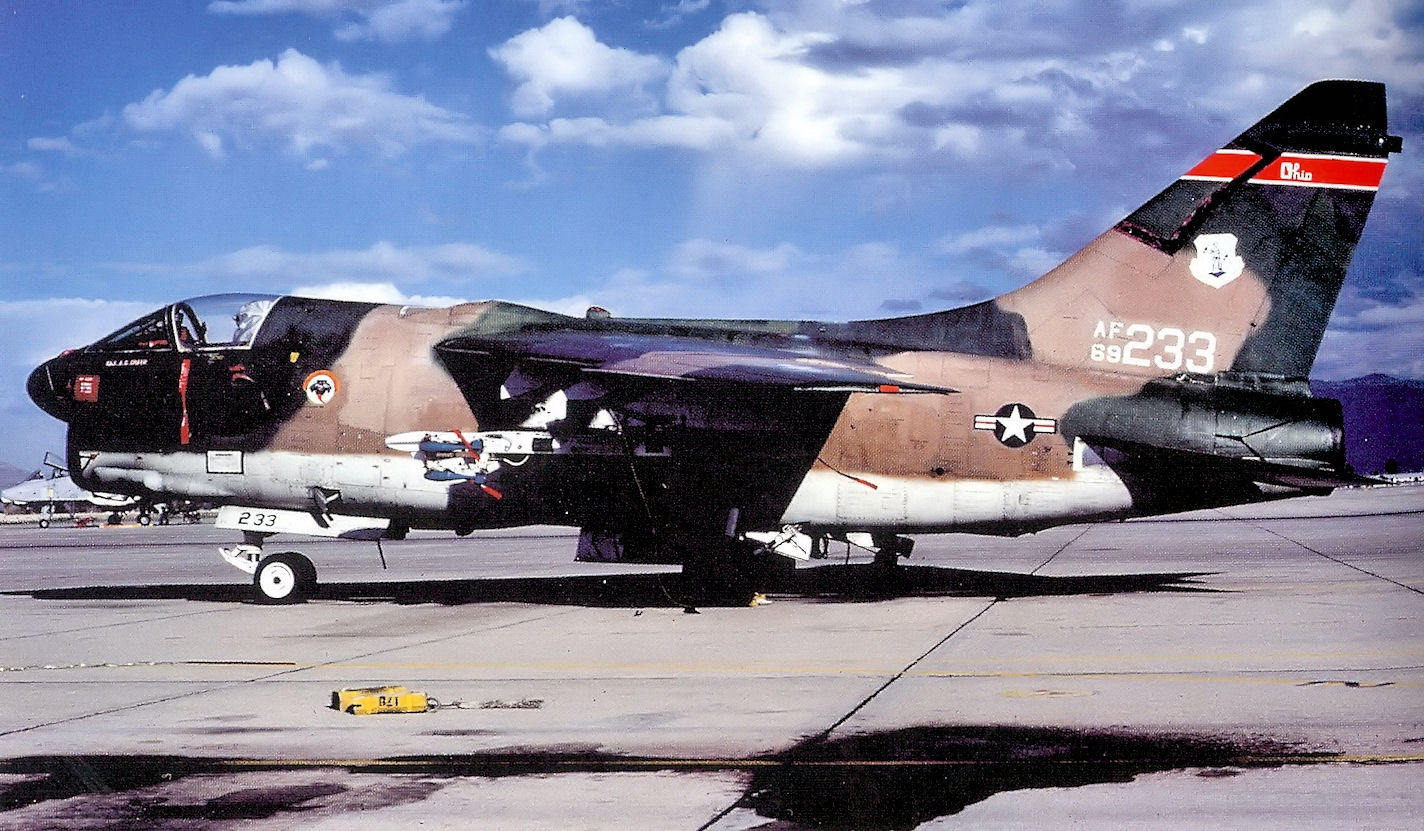
62nd Tactical Fighter Squadron A-7D-5-CV Corsair II 69–6233 in 1978

January 1978 initiated the conversion to the LTV A-7D Corsair II attack aircraft. The conversion from the F-100 to the A-7 was accomplished in less than three months, the fastest ever for an Air Force or Air National Guard unit. The first major deployment with the A-7 was to Patrick Air Force Base, Florida, on 12 August in support of forward air controller training. Also in 1978, the 162nd participated in Red Flag 78-9 on 23 September, and Tequilla Shooter at Marine Corps Air Station Yuma, Arizona, from 14 to 20 November.

The first deployment in 1979 was Operation Snowbird again as 118 enlisted and 30 officers deployed to Davis-Monthan Air Force Base in support of the exercise. "Sabre Sluff 79-2," a locally generated version of "Red Flag" was conducted at Springfield during 26–28 April, providing realistic training for the 162nd's flying, communications, and radar control units. 13–15 September saw a second "Sabre Sluff" exercise, now known as "Buckeye Flag," carried out.

The 1980 exercise year started with "Empire Glacier" at Fort Drum, New York. The 162nd was awarded the Air Force Outstanding Unit Award for its meritorious service from 1 March 1978 to 28 February 1979. In April, the 162nd was teamed with the Ohio ANG 166th Tactical Fighter Squadron in support of Exercise Cope Elite. The exercise which was carried out at NAS Barbers Point, Hawaii, involved combat training for U.S. Army and Air Force units based in Hawaii.

In February 1981, Major John Smith commanded a six-aircraft deployment to the 49th TFW at Holloman AFB, New Mexico for Dissimilar air combat training (DACT). In March, the squadron flew close air support (CAS) missions for opposing forces during "Eagle Strike I," an exercise involving two brigades for the 101st Airborne Division at Fort Campbell, Kentucky. During the May exercise "Maple Flag 7," support was given to the Ohio ANG 112th Tactical Fighter Squadron for a 30-day rotation TDY to Howard Air Force Base, Panama. This deployment provided the only operational fighters in the Southern Command. In July, the 162nd participated in the Michigan-based combat readiness exercise "Sentry Buckeye XI," the first "Sentry Buckeye" to be flown from the Alpena Combat Readiness Training Center.

1982 was a busy year with the unit taking part in eight individual exercises, including "Red Flag 82-4" at Nellis Air Force Base, Nevada. The 162nd won the annual Ohio ANG Turkey Shoot Competition in October at the Jefferson Proving Ground air-to-ground range. The squadron also celebrated its 35th anniversary with an open house and a military ball.

More deployments were in store for 1983, starting with Coronet Castle in April. In June, the 162nd completed five and one-half years of accident-free flying and earned the Tactical Air Command Flight Safety Award.

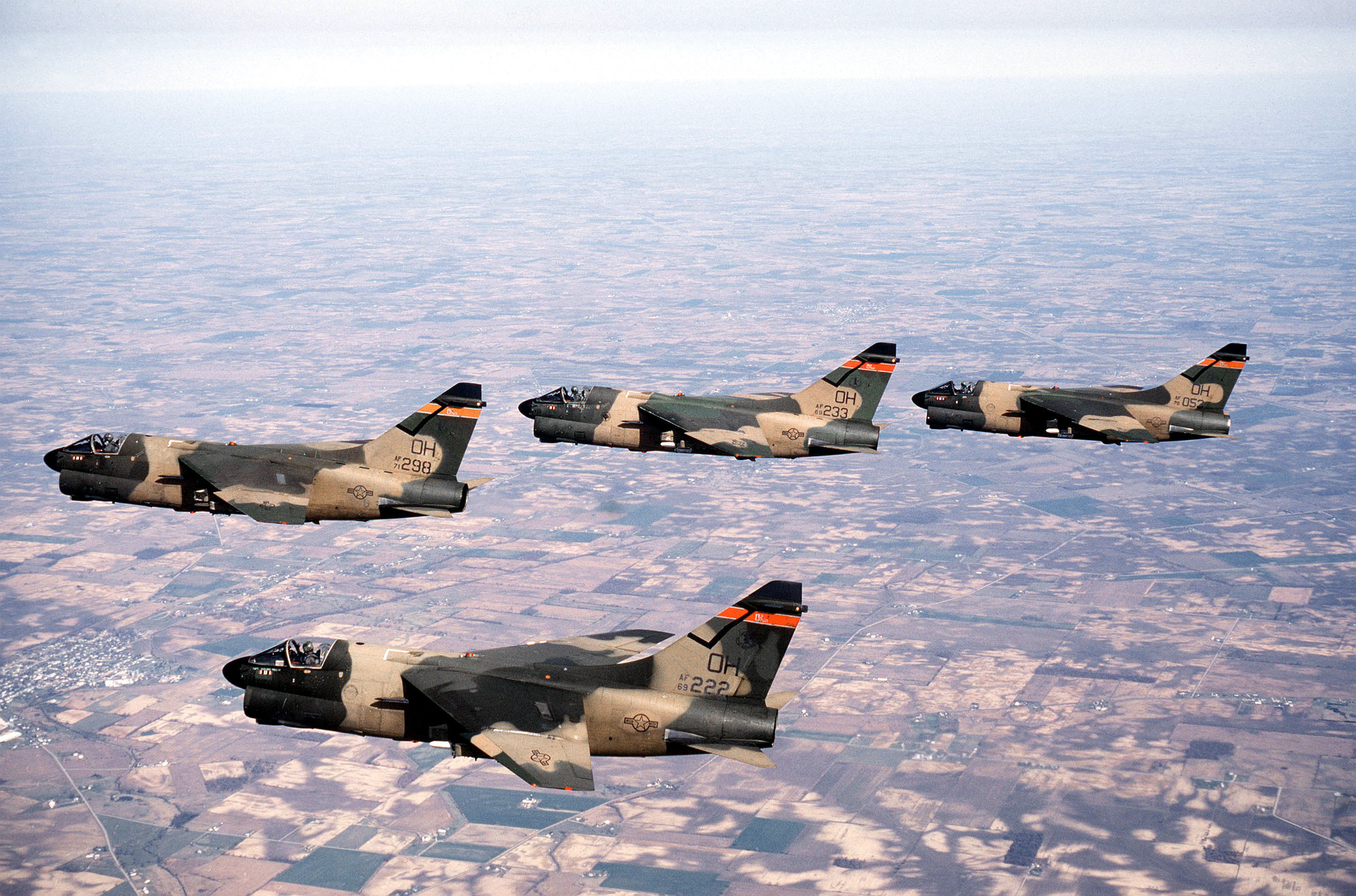
Four A-7D Corsair II fighters from the 162nd Tactical Fighter Squadron in flight during 1984 (Note: Aircraft are LTV A-7D Corsair II, serials 69–6222, 69–6233, 70–1053, 71–1298.)

1984's first deployment was the Panama rotation. In April, it was up to Canada for Exercise Maple Flag. The June Exercise Sentry Buckeye at Alpena, Michigan pitted "friendly" forces against "aggressor" forces from the Missouri ANG 131st Tactical Fighter Wing. A deployment in December for another Operation Snowbird at Davis-Monthan rounded out the year. A Red Flag exercise at Nellis was the first deployment for 1985. Exercise Solid Shield, a joint exercise with the 166th TFS was conducted in May at the Naval Air Station Key West, Florida. In June, it was off to the Panama Canal Zone for a deployment involving 50 personnel and four aircraft.

In 1986, DACT missions were conducted from January to April at various locations. Also in April, CAS sorties were flown for the Canadian Forces Operation School. Exercise Coronet Miami, a six-week NATO exercise, was begun at RAF Sculthorpe, England. There the 162nd trained with military elements of NATO and the United States Air Forces in Europe. In November, 14 aircraft and 149 personnel supported Operation Snowbird. The final 162nd deployment for 1986 was at CFB Chatham, New Brunswick. There, CAS missions were provided for the school that trains forward controller for the Canadian Armed Forces. With all of the flying, the 162nd ended the year with the prestigious Tappan Memorial Trophy, awarded to Ohio's outstanding Air National Guard Unit.

On 28 February 1987, the 162nd deployed five A-7D aircraft and 41 personnel to MacDill Air Force Base, Florida in support of the Ninth Air Force FAC (Forward Air Controller Training). In March 1987, the 162nd rotated to support CORNET COVE XII, a 30-day mission to Howard Air Force Base in which the 162nd maintained the only operational fighter in the Southern Air Command. Nine officers and 43 members deployed four A-7D aircraft to provide the 24th Composite Wing the support they needed.

In 1988, the 162nd took twelve aircraft to participate in Eercise Snowbird for the December deployment that allowed the jets to schedule heavy air operations in Davis-Monthan. 1989 saw the 162nd participate in Panama for the 11th time in 19 years to support CORONET COVE. Nine officers and 46 enlisted provided five aircraft to support the 24th Composite Wing operations. In May 1989, the 162nd deployed in support of CORONET PINE I and II at RAF Sculthorpe, England. After a series of groundings, the 162nd deployed five aircraft and 295 personnel to participate in a major NATO exercise called CENTRAL ENTERPRISE at RAF Boscombe Down, England.

In 1990, Operation Desert Storm saw 93 unit members deploy to the Middle East, but the A-7D aircraft remained in Ohio as by then, they were considered second-line aircraft, being replaced by the A-10 Thunderbolt II in front-line combat service. In September 1990, the 162nd deployed to the Alpena Combat Readiness Training Center, Michigan for field training. The 162nd ended 1990 at Davis-Monthan in support of the December Exercise Snowbird. In March 1991, the 162nd deployed to the Gulfport Combat Readiness Training Center, Mississippi and flew a total of 219 sorties during the deployment exercise. In September 1991, the 162nd deployed seven aircraft to Nellis to participate in AIR WARRIOR exercise. The 162nd deployed again to support SNOWBIRD at Davis-Monthan AFB in November 1991. In 1992 the 162nd deployed to Savannah Air National Guard Base, Georgia to support practicing units for the William Tell Competition and then traveled to Otis Air National Guard Base, Massachusetts for DACT training soon after.

In May 1993 the 162nd hosted a farewell to the A-7D Corsair II. The SLUF Salute was an Air Force sanctioned event to say farewell to this great aircraft that the 162nd flew from 1978 to 1993. The 162nd flew the last public demonstration of the A-7D Corsair II in the United States. While assigned to the unit, the aircraft flew a total of 55,357.4 hours.

==== Air Combat Command ====
In March 1992, the unit adopted the USAF Objective Wing organization and the 178th Tactical Fighter Group became simply the 178th Fighter Group; the 162nd as a Fighter Squadron. On 1 June of that year, Tactical Air Command was inactivated as part of the Air Force re-organizing after the end of the Cold War. Air Combat Command became the gaining major command for the 178th.

During May 1993 the squadron marked the end of 15 years of A-7D operations with the 162nd Fighter Squadron. Later in the year the conversion to the Block 30 F-16C Fighting Falcon. The 162nd took twelve F-16's, 20 pilots and over 600 personnel to Operation Winterbase at the Gulfport Combat Readiness Training Center to perform flight training for the first big deployment with the new F-16Cs. During the month long deployment, 30 aircrew certifications were attained and the sortie generation was the largest ever by the 178th Fighter Group. For LONGSHOT 94, the 162nd launched four F-16's in support of the competition. The mission was for the aircraft to rendezvous with the various units fly to Nellis AFB, Nevada to drop ordnance on target and on time. Opposing Red Air Enemy attempted to thwart the attack. The 162nd was part of the outstanding 3rd place team.

In 1995, Operation Snowbird occurred in February, with the 162nd flying 223 sorties for live weapons and desert combat simulations. Later in April 1995, the 162nd provided Red Air for Tyndall Air Force Base, Florida air training in dissimilar air combat training (DACT) called Longshot 95. In June 1995, the 162nd deployed to Karup Air Base, Denmark to participate in NATO exercises Baltop 95 and Central Enterprise. The 162nd provided Red Air for the Baltrop exercise and flew 225 sorties in Central Enterprise with eight of the F-16 aircraft from the 162nd.

On 11 October 1995, in accordance with the Air Force One Base-One Wing directive, the 178th Fighter Group was expanded and changed in status to the 178th Fighter Wing. Under the Objective Wing organization, the 162nd Fighter Squadron was assigned to the 178th Operations Group. In December 1995, DACT training occurred again for the 162nd at the Gulfport CRTC, Mississippi.

During the period of 1995 to 1998, the 162nd took first place in the Turkey Shoot Competition in Indiana, taking on units from the Ohio ANG and other participating states showing the 162nd skill and accuracy in air-to-ground employment.

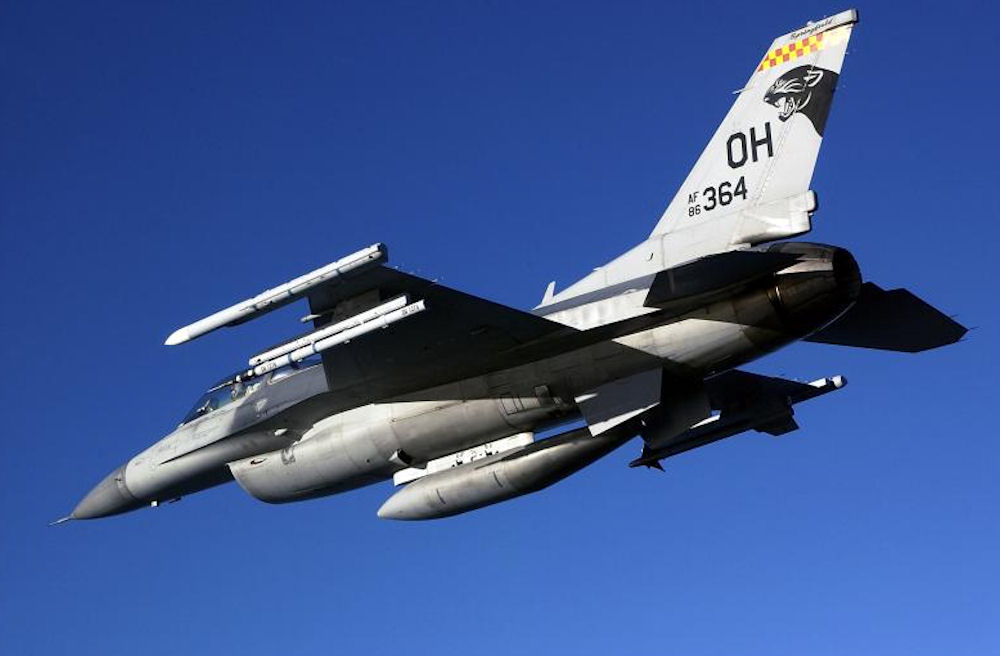
F-16C block 30 #86-0364 from the 162nd FS is on a training mission, armed with AIM-120 AMRAAM missiles, over Savannah, Georgia on 14 January 2003.

In mid-1996, the Air Force, in response to budget cuts, and changing world situations, began experimenting with air expeditionary organizations. The Air Expeditionary Force concept was developed that would mix Active-Duty, Reserve and Air National Guard elements into a combined force. Instead of entire permanent units deploying as provisional as in the 1991 Gulf War, Expeditionary units are composed of "aviation packages" from several wings, including active-duty Air Force, the Air Force Reserve Command and the Air National Guard, would be married together to carry out the assigned deployment rotation.

In August 1996, the 162nd Expeditionary Fighter Squadron was first formed from squadron personnel and aircraft and deployed to Al Jaber Air Base, Kuwait to support Operation Southern Watch and Operation Desert Strike with the mission to enforce the southern no-fly zone imposed by the United Nations over Iraq. In 1997, the 162nd Fighter Squadron deployed to Tyndall for a Combat Archer exercise to perform supersonic air-to-air combat with drones.

In May 1997, the 162nd EFS was again formed, deploying to Incirlik Air Base, Turkey to support Operation Northern Watch. Later in 1997, the 162nd Fighter Squadron invited past members to attend the 50th Anniversary Celebration of the squadron at Springfield. In 1998 the 162nd deployed to Eielson Air Force Base, Alaska for Exercise Cope Thunder arctic training.

==== Air Education and Training Command ====
In 1998 the mission of the 178th Fighter Wing was changed to become a flying training unit under Air Education and Training Command. Its new mission was to skillfully train and support Active Duty, Guard and Reserve F-16 pilots as an advanced flight training unit. Its gaining command was officially changed from Air Combat Command to AETC on 17 March 1999. As part of the new mission, the 162nd received Block 30 F-16D twin-seat trainers which provided the aircraft required for training. Courses included the Basic Course, or also known as the B-course, which was for students who have never flown a fighter aircraft, but are graduates of Air Force Undergraduate Pilot Training. Students were put through an 8.5-month training module. This included in class time, simulator training and in-flight training.

In 2000 the 162nd took their F-16's to Savannah Air National Guard Base, Georgia for Annual Training. In 2001, the 162nd went back to Hickam Air Force Base, Hawaii for the first time in 20 years to participate in exercise SENTRY ALOHA 01.

In September 2001, while on Annual Training at the Alpena Combat Readiness Training Center the 11 September 2001 terrorist attack on the World Trade Center and the Pentagon occurred. The 162nd flew numerous missions in support of homeland defense and for Operation Noble Eagle.

==== BRAC 2005 and closeout of F-16 operations ====
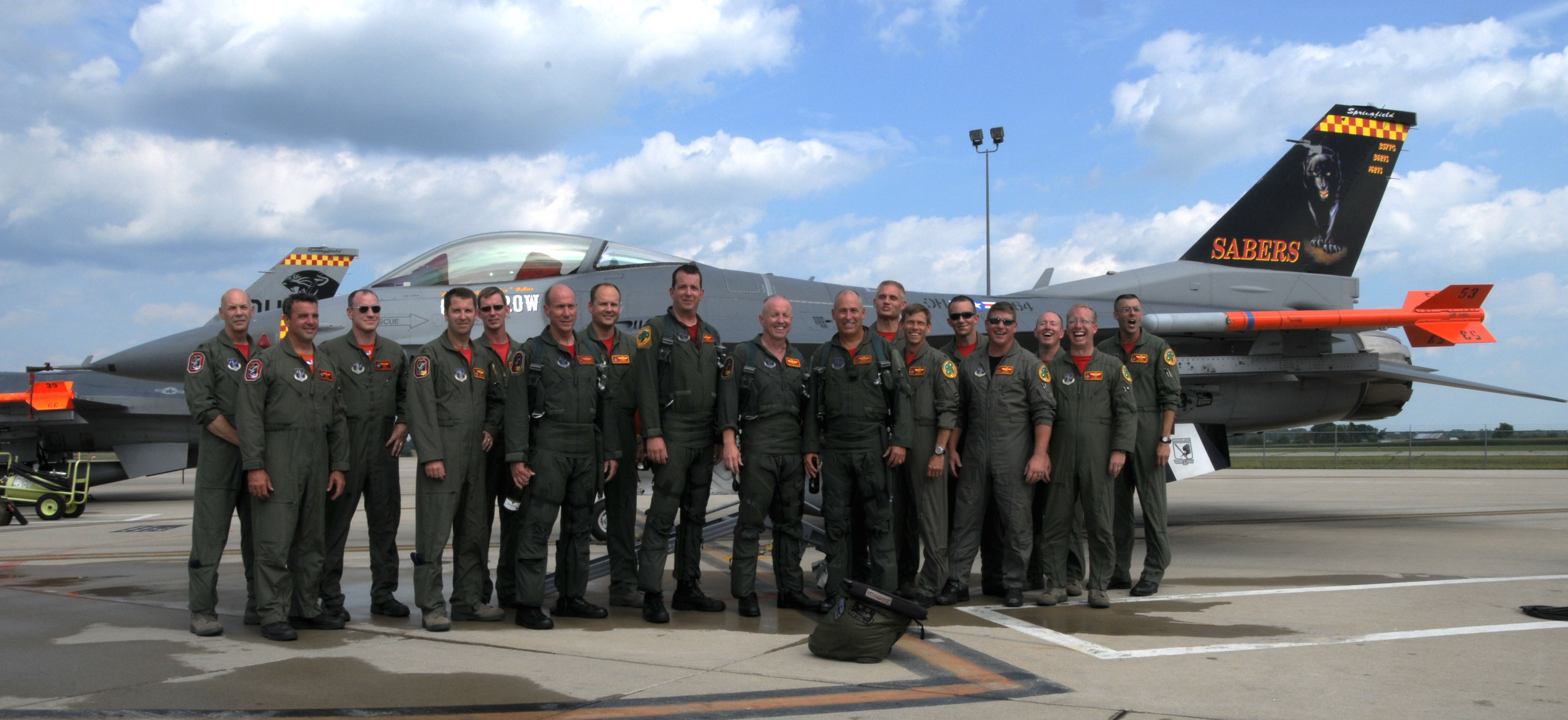
Pilots from the 178th FW gather in front of F-16C block 30 #86-0364 from the 162nd FS on 30 July 2010 in Springfield, Ohio. It is the last time these pilots would fly together here at Springfield.

Under the 2005 Base Closure and Realignment Commission, a decision came down that the parent 178th Fighter Wing would lose its sixteen F-16s and ultimately convert to a drone squadron. The Springfield aircraft would be distributed to the 132nd Fighter Wing, Des Moines IAP AGS, IA (nine aircraft); the 140th Wing, Buckley Air Force Base, CO (three aircraft) and 149th Fighter Wing, Lackland Air Force Base, TX (four aircraft). It was later revealed that the decision may have been a mistake as the 2005 BRAC decision did not take into account that the 162nd FS was indeed a training squadron, however the decision stood.

In the interim, through the Foreign Military Sales program, the 178th was able to obtain another training mission with the Royal Netherlands Air Force (RBAF). In April 2007 the Dutch 306 Detachment from Tucson Air National Guard Base, Arizona moved to Springfield to provide a different training environment. The detachment was not associated directly to the 162nd FS. However the Springfield facilities were F-16 ready so as a result, when the 162nd FS shut down their F-16 operations, the Dutch detachment would leave shortly after. The current RNAF training mission at Springfield ended in 2010 when the unit returned to Arizona. About 6 classes graduated out of the Dutch detachment while at Springfield.

The 162nd FS graduated its final American F-16 Basic Course class on 12 December 2009. The class had started on 30 March 2009. In the squadron's tenure, as a training squadron, a total 77 pilots went through the B-course. Another 273 people went for pilots upgrading to operational or formal training instructor pilot. This made a total of 350 pilots that received any pilot training at Springfield.

Knowing the American training mission would be ending soon, the 178th pursued another foreign military training mission with the Singapore Air Force. However, in 2009 it became apparent that mission would not be coming to Springfield due to economic limitations.

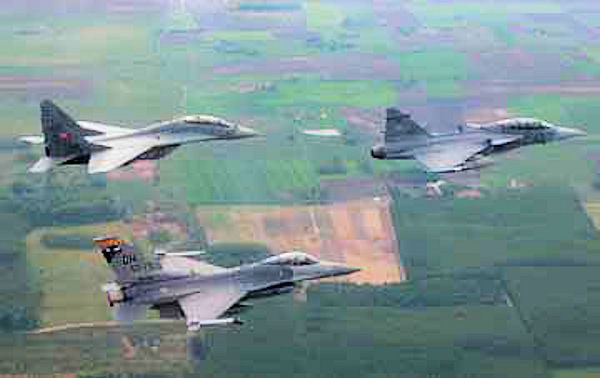
162nd FS and Hungarian Air Force MiG-29 and SAAB Gripen

Just prior to the squadron closing out Viper operations, on 22 April 2010 the squadron had a more well received deployment in Hungary. The fifteen-day deployment allowed USAF F-16s to fly with Hungarian Air Force Saab JAS 39 Gripens, MiG-29s and the Mi-24s. The American pilots and Hungarian AF pilots had the opportunity to engage in various air-to-air scenarios.

For the 162nd the final sortie was on 30 July 2010. To celebrate the squadron's history, F-16C #86-0364 was painted up in special markings and incorporated some markings from the famous Second World War P-51 Mustang Old Crow. On the last flight four of the most senior pilots in the squadron with the most hours in the F-16 flew. The four pilots had a combined 100 years in fighters and topped out at 15,920 hours in fighters with 12,380 of those hours in the Viper. Although the last sortie had been a few months earlier, the last American aircraft departed Springfield on 20 September 2010.

==== Reconnaissance mission ====
On 7 May 2010 the DoD and the Air Force decided to assign the 178th a new mission as a ground control station for the General Atomics MQ-1 Predator and an extension of the intelligence analysis mission from the National Air and Space Intelligence Center.

Conversion to the MQ-1 began in 2010. The mission is under the control of the Air Combat Command. Pilots based in Springfield can fly MQ-1s on the other side of the world in Iraq or Afghanistan. A second component works under the National Air and Space Intelligence Center.

The 178th Operations Group was redesignated as the 178th Reconnaissance Group and consists of the 162nd Attack Squadron and the 178th Operational Support Squadron with 131 traditional and 81 full-time personnel.

== Lineage ==
Legacy 162nd Fighter Squadron emblem

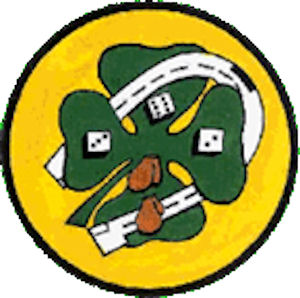
Emblem of the World War II 362nd Fighter Squadron

- Constituted as the 362nd Fighter Squadron and activated on 1 December 1942

Inactivated on 20 August 1946.

- Redesignated 162nd Fighter Squadron and allotted to the National Guard on 21 August 1946

Extended federal recognition on 22 November 1947
Redesignated 162nd Fighter Bomber Squadron on 1 October 1952
Redesignated 162nd Fighter Interceptor Squadron On 1 July 1955
Redesignated 162nd Fighter-Interceptor Squadron, Day (Special Delivery) on 1 November 1957
Redesignated 162nd Tactical Fighter Squadron on 10 November 1958
Federalized and ordered to active service on 1 October 1961
Released from active duty and returned to Ohio state control on 31 August 1962
Redesignated 162nd Fighter Squadron on 15 March 1992
Redesignated 162nd Reconnaissance Squadron on 10 June 2010
Redesignated 162nd Attack Squadron

=== Assignments ===
- 357th Fighter Group, 1 Dec 1942 – 20 Aug 1946
- 66th Fighter Wing, 22 November 1947
- 55th Fighter Wing, 7 December 1947
- 121st Fighter Group (later 121st Fighter-Interceptor Group, 121st Fighter-Bomber Group, 121st Tactical Fighter Group, 26 June 1948 (elements attached to: 7122nd Tactical Wing, 1 October 1961 – 31 August 1962)
- 178th Tactical Fighter Group (later 178th Fighter Group), 15 October 1962
- 178th Operations Group, 1 October 1995
- 178th Reconnaissance Group, 10 June 2010 – present

=== Stations ===
- Hamilton Field, California, 1 December 1942
- Tonopah Army Air Field, Nevada, 6 March 1943
- Santa Rosa Army Air Field, California, 3 June 1943
- Oroville Army Air Field, California, 18 August 1943
- Casper Army Air Field, Wyoming, 7 Oct-9 Nov 1943
- RAF Raydon (AAF-157), England, 1 December 1943
- RAF Leiston (AAF-373), England, 1 February 1944
- AAF Station Neubiberg, Germany, 20 Jul 1945 – 20 Aug 1946.
- Cox-Dayton Municipal Airport, Ohio, 22 November 1947
- Springfield Municipal Airport (later Springfield-Beckley Municipal Airport, Springfield Air National Guard Base), Ohio, 1 September 1955 – present

==== Ohio Air National Guard deployments ====
- 1991 Gulf War (Desert Storm/Desert Shield)

Saudi Arabia, 1990–1991

- Operation Southern Watch (AEF)

Al Jaber Air Base, Kuwait, August–October 1996

- Operation Northern Watch (AEF)

Incirlik Air Base, Turkey, June–August 1997

=== Aircraft ===
- P-39 Airacobra, 1943
- P-51B/C/D/H/K (later F-51) Mustang, 1943–1946, 1947–1955
- F-84E Thunderjet, 1955–1957
- F-84F Thunderstreak, 1957–1970
- F-100D/F Super Sabre, 1970–1978
- A-7D/K Corsair II, 1978–1993
- Block 30 F-16C Fighting Falcon, 1993–2010
- Block 30 F-16D Fighting Falcon, 1997–2010
- MQ-1 Predator, 2010 – ?
- MQ-9 Reaper ? – present

=== World War II Unit decorations and campaigns ===
- Distinguished Unit Citation: Germany, 6 Mar and 29 June 1944 (Special Order #WD GO 29)
- Distinguished Unit Citation: Derben, Germany, 14 January 1945 (Special Order #WD GO 25)
- French Croix De Guerre with Palm: 11 Feb 1944–15 Jan 1945 Foreign Decoration
- Air Offensive Europe 1942–1944
- Normandy Campaign 1944
- Northern France 1945
- Ardennes-Alsace 1944–1945
- Central Europe 1945
- Rhineland 1945
