= Springfield–Beckley Municipal Airport =

Airport in Ohio, United States of America

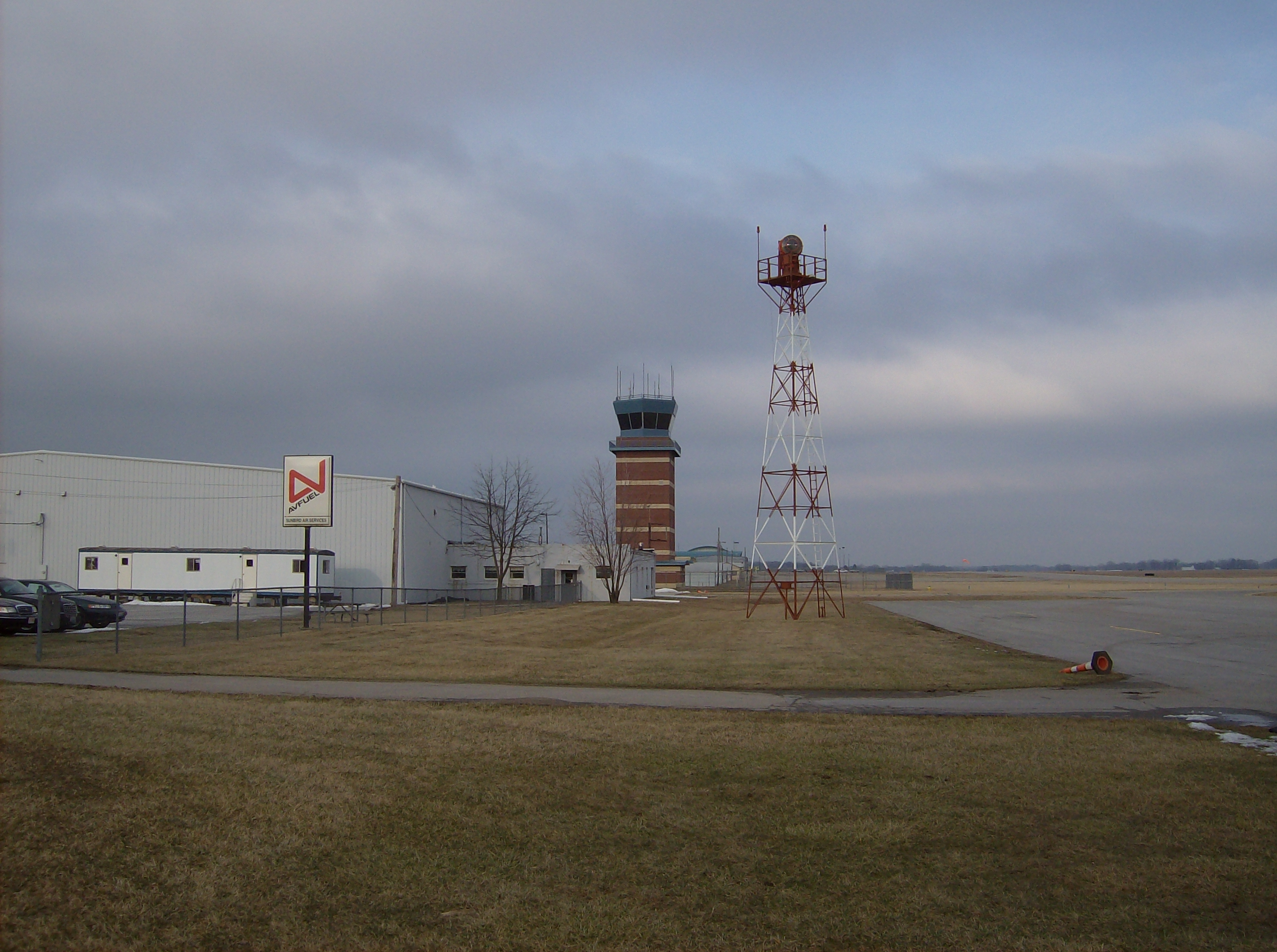
- IATA: SGH; ICAO: KSGH; FAA LID: SGH

Summary
- Airport type: Public
- Owner: City of Springfield
- Serves: Springfield, Ohio
- Location: Green Township, Clark County, near Springfield, Ohio
- Occupants: 178th Wing
- Time zone: UTC−05:00 (-5)
  - Summer (DST): UTC−04:00 (-4)
- Elevation AMSL: 1,051 ft (320 m)
- Coordinates: 39°50′25″N 083°50′25″W
- Website: www.airparkohio.com/beckly_airport.html

Map
- Location within Ohio Location within the United States

Runways
Direction	Length		Surface
Direction	ft	m	Surface
06/24	9,010	2,746	Asphalt/concrete
15/33	5,498	1,676	Asphalt

Statistics (2022)
- Aircraft operations: 32,770
- Based aircraft: 32
- Source: Federal Aviation Administration

Springfield–Beckley Municipal Airport (IATA: SGH, ICAO: KSGH, FAA LID: SGH) is a civil-military airport in Green Township in Clark County, Ohio, United States. It is owned by the city of Springfield, 5 miles (8.0 km) to the north. It is named after the Beckley family, a member of which knew the Wright Brothers, and witnessed and photographed their first flights.

Three units of the Ohio Air National Guard, including the 178th Wing (formerly 178th Fighter Wing), are based at the co-located Springfield Air National Guard Base.

The airport hosts events such as fly-ins and airshows with vintage airplanes.

== History ==
The first Springfield Municipal Airport, located approximately 4 miles southeast of the town, was dedicated as part of a two-day airshow on 14–15 July 1928.

A $800,000 federal grant for the establishment of a new airport was approved on 15 June 1943. Plans called for three 5,500-foot (1,700 m) runways, with the ability to extend them to 7,500-foot (2,300 m) in the future. Site selection progressed quickly, with the initial twelve sites considered being narrowed down first to eight, and eventually one, by July 26th. However, landowners protested and the city began legal action to appropriate the land in late October. Construction on the new Springfield Municipal Airport began on 29 August 1944. The first airplane landed at the airport on 14 May 1946 and the facility, though incomplete, had been opened by the 25th.

Postwar commercial air service started in early 1948, when TWA flights began landing at the airport. Plans to install a landing light system by the following spring were announced in September, as TWA stated that it would stop serving the airport unless it was so equipped. However, a series of faults with the system delayed its operation for over a year and TWA announced that it would cease operations in September 1950 due to the route's unprofitability. Lake Central subsequently took over service and operated from the airport from 1953 to 1955.

The Ohio Air National Guard announced in August 1952 that it was considering moving the 162nd Fighter Squadron to the airport, but the city would have to purchase 228 acres (92 ha) to extend the runway to 9,500-foot (2,900 m) to accommodate the unit's jets. Construction of the extension had begun by July 1954. The unit began moving to the airport in early September 1955 and was operational by the end of the month.

An emergency HF radio facility was being installed at the airport in February 1965.

The airport was renamed Springfield–Beckley Municipal Airport for World War I aviator Henry A. Beckley on 7 October 1985.

An adjacent 190 acres (77 ha) industrial park, called Airpark Ohio opened in September 1994, but remained unoccupied six years later. By January 2000, a Learjet maintenance business called Spectra Jet had been established at the airport. A year later, after being certified to work on the Learjet 31, it began seeking an expansion to the ramp.

In 2005, the 178th Fighter Wing lost its F-16 training mission due to the Base Realignment and Closure Act.

Spectra Jet announced plans for an expansion in 2012 and again in 2016. It also repeated its request to the city for an enlarged apron in 2014 following the failure of a proposal earlier that year. The airport received an updated master plan in 2016. A project to build six t-hangars and four box hangars was nearly complete by mid September 2017.

In 2021, the airport received more than $2 million in federal grants to rehabilitate its runways and add runway lighting. An additional $226,000 grant that year, approved to provide greater access to drive and parking areas for facilities at the airport, funded an electric charging station and a controlled flight simulator. In 2022, the airport removed and reinstalled a taxiway that had surpassed its useful life and did not conform to FAA standards. City officials approved money for more lighting upgrades. In 2023, new $1.2-million hangars opened and the aircraft parking ramp was expanded to accommodate the planned growth of a maintenance shop.

The airport was named the 2023 Ohio Airport of the Year by the Ohio Aviation Association. This was in part due to substantial fuel sales during the onset of the COVID-19 pandemic in 2020.

The airport was formerly home to the Ohio Center for Precision Agriculture.

== Facilities ==
The airport covers 1,516 acres (614 ha) and has two asphalt runways. Runway 06/24 measures 9,010 x 150 ft (2,746 x 46 m). Runway 15/33 measures 5,498 x 100 ft (1,676 x 30 m). The airport has a fixed-base operator that sells fuel. It offers services such as catering, hangaring, and courtesy cars and amenities such as internet, conference rooms, vending machines, a crew lounge, snooze rooms, television, and more.

The airport is home to flight schools. Flight training is available for students at the Clark State Community College.

=== UAS testing ===
The airport is home to the Ohio UAS Center, which is managed by the Ohio Department of Transportation.

Planning began in 2013 in an effort to secure one of six UAS test sites created by the Federal Aviation Administration. The first UAS testing at the airport was approved in 2019, when the United States Air Force began testing drones at the airport through the Air Force Research Lab.

The airport hosts flight testing for Amazon and Walmart home delivery services. It is also the site of the National Advanced Air Mobility Center of Excellence, which will focus on research into autonomous flight, electrical vertical takeoff and landing vehicles, and electric flight for the U.S. Department of Defense.

The airport has specially designed airspace to protect these operations as well as unique surveillance radar that operates out of a converted bus.

=== Aircraft ===
In the year ending November 8, 2022, the airport had 32,770 aircraft operations, an average of 90 per day: 99% general aviation, <1% military, and <1% air taxi. That year, 32 aircraft were then based at this airport: 23 single-engine and seven multi-engine airplanes, one jet aircraft, and one helicopter.

== Accidents and incidents ==
- On 11 October 1953, an airplane crashed at the airport, killing the pilot. The pilot, Earl Ashford, was the airport manager and had been performing a routine about "how not to fly an airplane" at an airshow. A second plane was damaged in a wheels up landing after the pilot was distracted by the crash and forgot to lower his landing gear.
- On 12 February 1972, two airplanes collided while attempting to land at the airport. One, a Bellanca, was able to land safely, but the other, operated by the Civil Air Patrol, crashed, killing the two occupants.
- On 3 June 1977, a Beechcraft E18 crashed while landing at the airport, killing the pilot.
- On February 9, 1988, a British Aerospace Jetstream operated by Jetstream International Airlines on a training flight yawed and rolled while executing a go around. The aircraft subsequently pitched up, rolled and entered a vertical descent and impacted the ground. All three crew were killed.
- On June 23, 2004, a Cessna 172 Skyhawk was substantially damaged when it impacted the ground after takeoff from the Springfield–Beckley Municipal Airport. The pilot was practicing touch-and-go landings at the airport. During climbout from the third approach, the airplane "dropped" and impacted the runway, first on its main landing gear, and then on its nose landing gear. The probable cause of the accident was found to be the pilot's failure to maintain adequate airspeed, resulting in a stall and hard landing.
- On August 23, 2015, a Cessna 172 Skyhawk was damaged while landing at the Springfield–Beckley Municipal Airport. The pilot reported that, during landing, he bounced hard two times. After the second bounce, he applied full power to go around. The pilot continued his cross-country flight to his final destination and landed without further incident. A post-flight inspection revealed substantial damage to the firewall. The probable cause of the accident was found to be the pilot's improper pitch control during landing, which resulted in a hard landing.
- On October 15, 2016, a Piper PA-34 Seneca was damaged during landing at the Springfield–Beckley Municipal Airport. The pilot made his approach with extra power to compensate for gusting winds. After the airplane's main landing gear touched down, the aircraft was disturbed by a wind gust and ballooned by 50 to 100 feet. Though the pilot initiated a go-around, the airplane impacted the runway in a flat attitude, and the nose landing gear was pushed/driven through the top of the cowling. The probable cause of the accident was found to be the pilot's inadequate compensation for gusting wind during the landing flare, which resulted in a hard landing.
- On December 2, 2017, a small plane landed in a field near the airport.
- On October 2, 2023, a small plane crashed at the airport.

== See also ==
- List of airports in Ohio
