= Hanoi Taxi =

Operation Homecoming aircraft

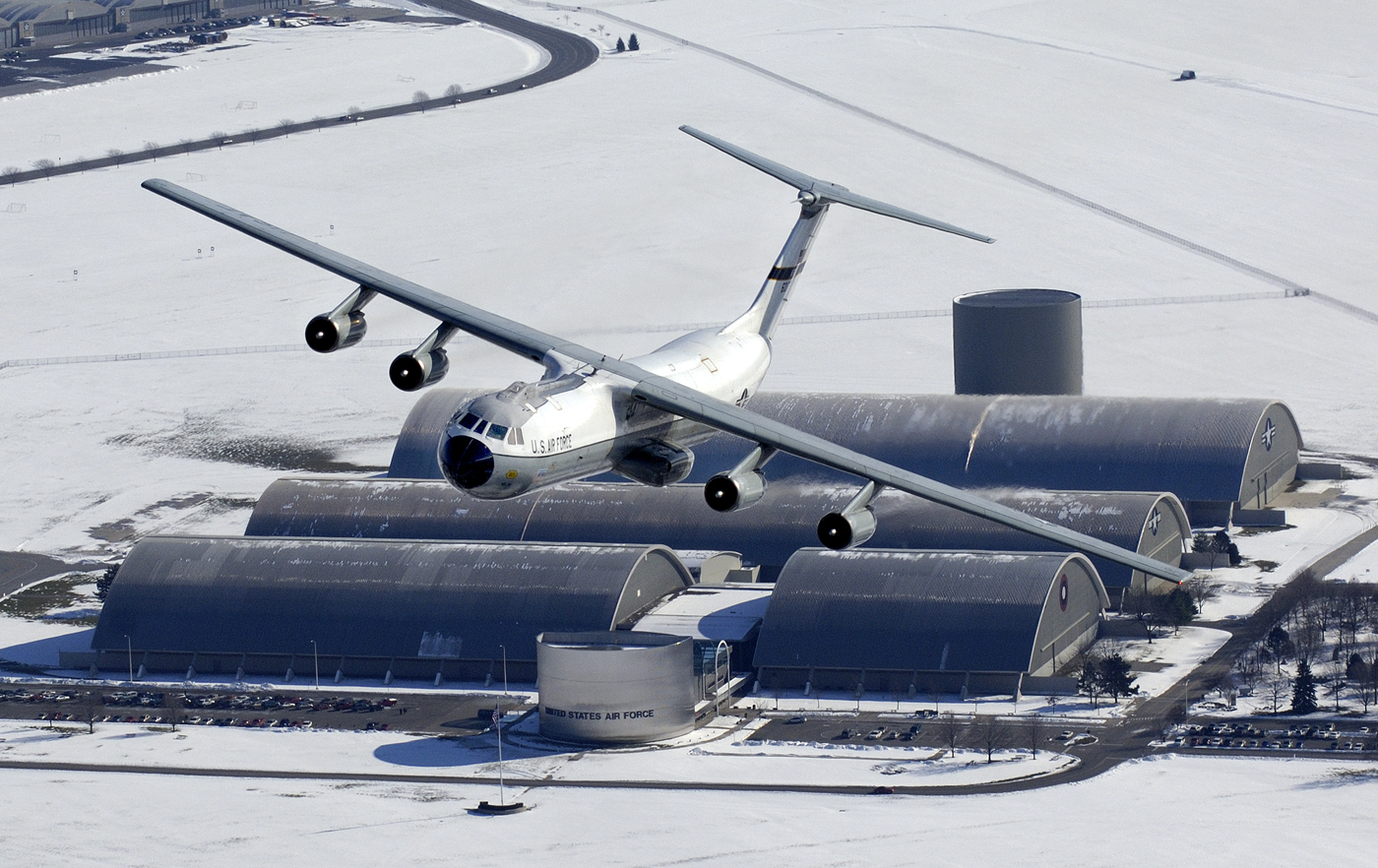
- Hanoi Taxi flying over the National Museum of the United States Air Force in December 2005

General information
- Type: Lockheed C-141 Starlifter
- Manufacturer: Lockheed Corporation
- Owners: United States Air Force
- Serial: 66-0177

History
- Preserved at: National Museum of the United States Air Force

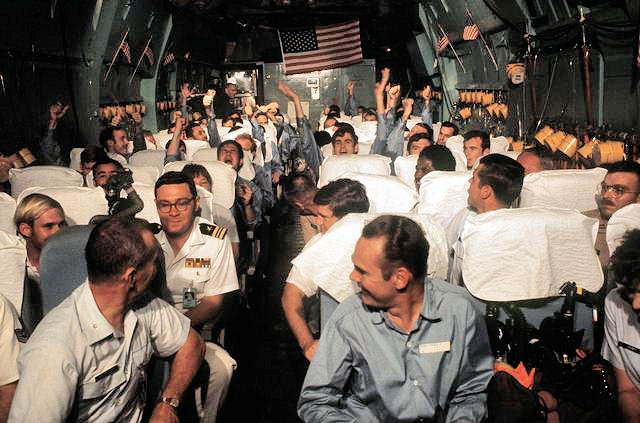
Recently released United States POWs from North Vietnamese prison camps being flown on board the Hanoi Taxi from Hanoi, North Vietnam, to Clark Air Base, Philippines, March 1973

Hanoi Taxi is a Lockheed C-141 Starlifter strategic airlift aircraft (serial number 66-0177) that was in service with the United States Air Force and became famous for bringing back the first returned prisoners of war in Operation Homecoming. This aircraft, which was delivered to the Air Force in 1967, was the last C-141 to be withdrawn from service after a career of 43 years.

As the last of the fleet was retired in 2006 as sufficient C-17 Globemaster III aircraft became available in the regular Air Force to allow C-141s still serving with Air Force Reserve units to be replaced by the C-5 Galaxy aircraft being seconded from the regular Air Force. The Hanoi Taxi is currently housed at the National Museum of the United States Air Force, near Dayton, Ohio.

== Operational history ==
=== Vietnam War Service ===
For much of the late 1960s and early 1970s, 66-0177 flew out of Norton Air Force Base, San Bernardino, California, with the 63rd Military Airlift Wing (MAW). The Hanoi Taxi flew Bob Hope to USO shows in South Vietnam. Hanoi Taxi was used in 1973, in the final days of the Vietnam War, to repatriate American POWs from North Vietnam.

On February 12, 1973, this particular aircraft, then a C-141A, was flown to Gia Lam Airport, near Hanoi, North Vietnam in the first mission of Operation Homecoming, the repatriation of former American prisoners of war. There were 40 former POWs on that first flight. One of the POWs on the first flight was Navy Commander Everett Alvarez Jr., the first American pilot to be shot down in North Vietnam and, by the war's end, the second longest-held POW there. (The longest-held was US Army Captain Floyd James Thompson who was released the following month.) Alvarez had spent eight-and-a-half years in captivity.

The Hanoi Taxi's name comes from the writing on the flight engineer's panel by the POWs aboard the plane for the freedom flight. The commander of the first pick‐up jet—No. 60177—was Major James E. Marrott, originally of Provo, Utah. His navigator was Lieutenant colonel James C. Warren, originally of Chicago. Both flew reconnaissance and electronic warfare planes over South Vietnam during the war. On May 5, the Hanoi Taxi repeated the feat by flying approximately 100 former Vietnam POWs to Clark Air Base, the Philippines.

Former naval aviator and senator John McCain, who spent five and a half years as a POW after being shot down by a missile over Hanoi was flown home aboard the Hanoi Taxi upon his release in 1973.

In May 2004, Air Force Major General Edward J. Mechenbier, himself a POW repatriated from Vietnam, flew the Hanoi Taxi back to Vietnam to repatriate the remains of two American service members killed in action during the war.

=== Later service ===
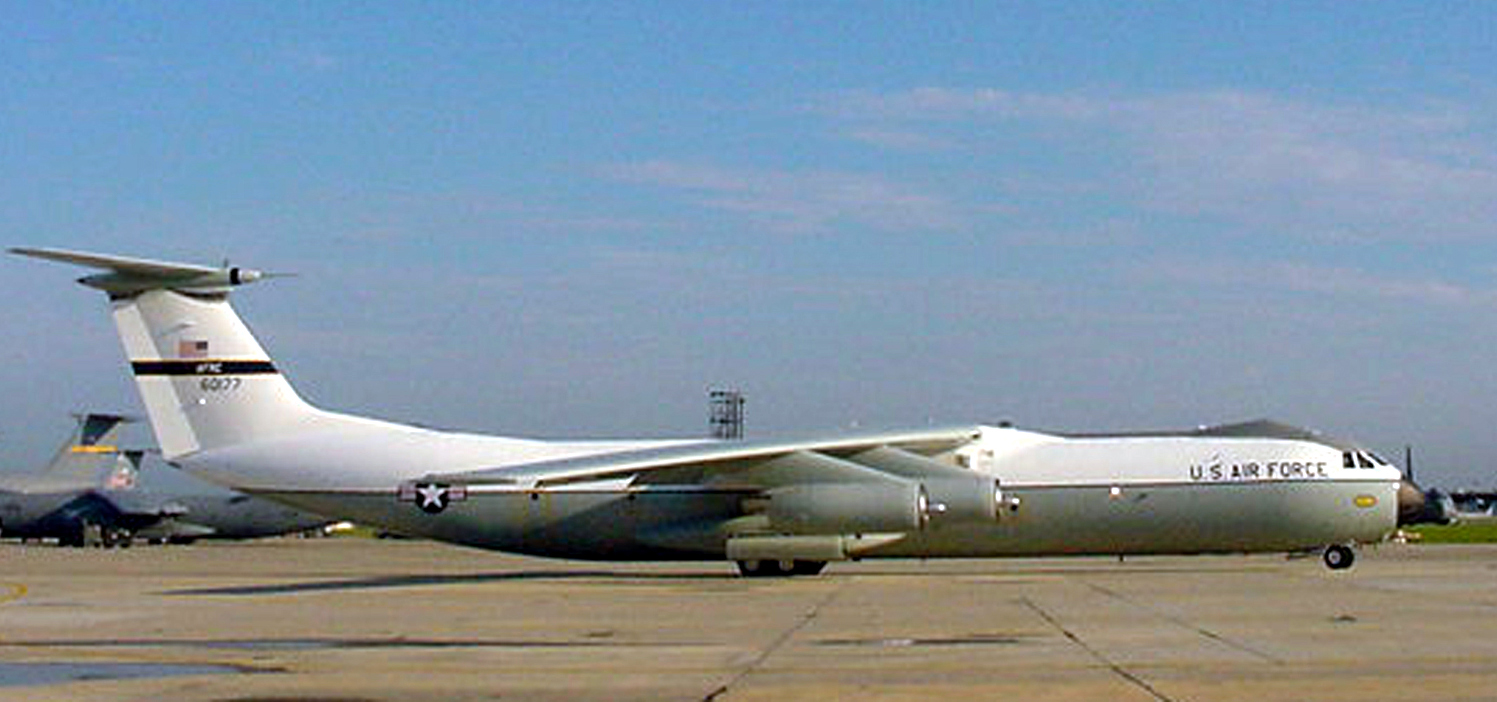
Hanoi Taxi after her 2002 repainting to 1970s livery. Other C-141s with the standard Air Force livery can be seen in the background.

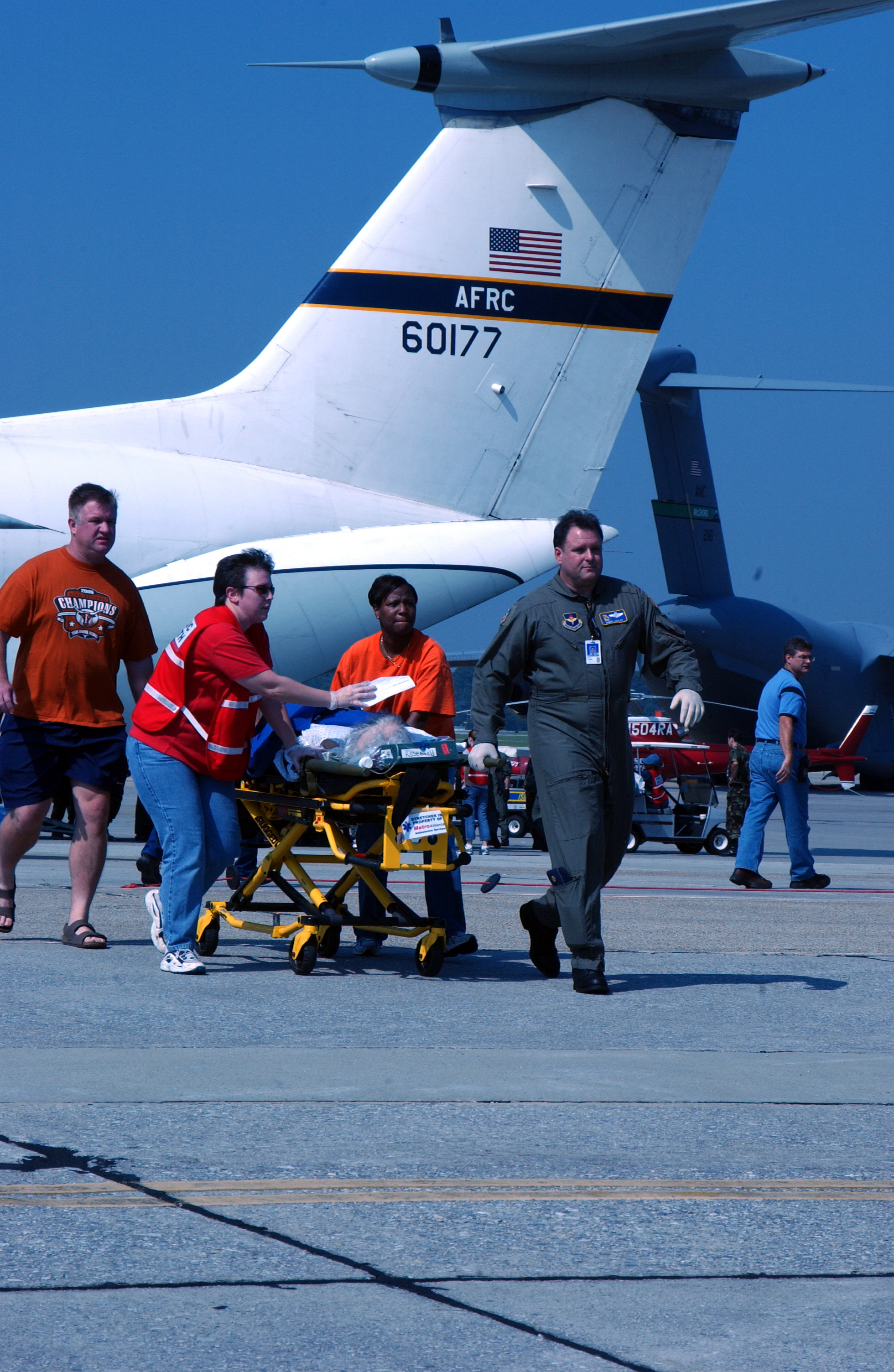
Volunteers from Dobbins Air Reserve Base, Georgia, shuttle a patient who arrived there on Hanoi Taxi. About 100 Hurricane Katrina victims were airlifted to Dobbins for transportation to hospitals in Atlanta.

Originally built as a standard C-141A, the aircraft was converted to a stretched C-141B in October 1981, along with most of the C-141 fleet. Subsequent avionics and structural upgrades saw the aircraft converted to the C-141C standard in 1999. Later in her career she was transferred to the 445th Airlift Wing at Wright Patterson Air Force Base (WPAFB) Area A in Ohio. In 2002 the aircraft's history was discovered by her crew chief while she was undergoing maintenance, and shortly thereafter she was repainted in the white-over-grey livery she wore in 1973 during her evacuation mission to Hanoi.

Signatures of the freed prisoners were preserved on the panel over the years and became the centerpiece of what was essentially a "flying museum". Plaques, documents and photographs of the homecoming are part of the on-board exhibit researched and created by the 445th Airlift Wing. Etchings of the names of those who are missing in action were taken from engravings on the Vietnam Veterans Memorial in Washington and are mounted on the plane. Framed photographs, plaques, and other memorabilia adorn the interior. Following her restoration the aircraft was first exhibited to the public at the 2003 Dayton Air Show. She appeared at numerous other venues until her retirement in May 2006.

=== Hurricane Katrina ===
In 2005, Hanoi Taxi was one of the aircraft marshalled by the Air Force to provide evacuation for those seeking refuge from Hurricane Katrina. This aircraft and others evacuated thousands of people, including the medical evacuation (MEDEVAC) of hundreds of ill and injured.

=== Retirement ===
With the scheduled 2006 retirement of the last 8 C-141s, the Hanoi Taxi embarked on a series of flights, giving veterans, some of whom flew out of captivity in this aircraft, the opportunity to experience one more flight before its retirement. At 9:30 AM on Saturday, 6 May 2006, the Hanoi Taxi touched down for the last time and was received in a formal retirement ceremony at the National Museum of the United States Air Force, located at Wright Patterson Air Force Base (WPAFB) Area B in Riverside, Ohio, near Dayton, Ohio. Area B is the Wright Field portion of the base with runways that are no longer in operational service except for inbound flights to the museum. Hanoi Taxi is now part of the permanent static display collection of the Museum.
