= 178th Wing =

178th Wing

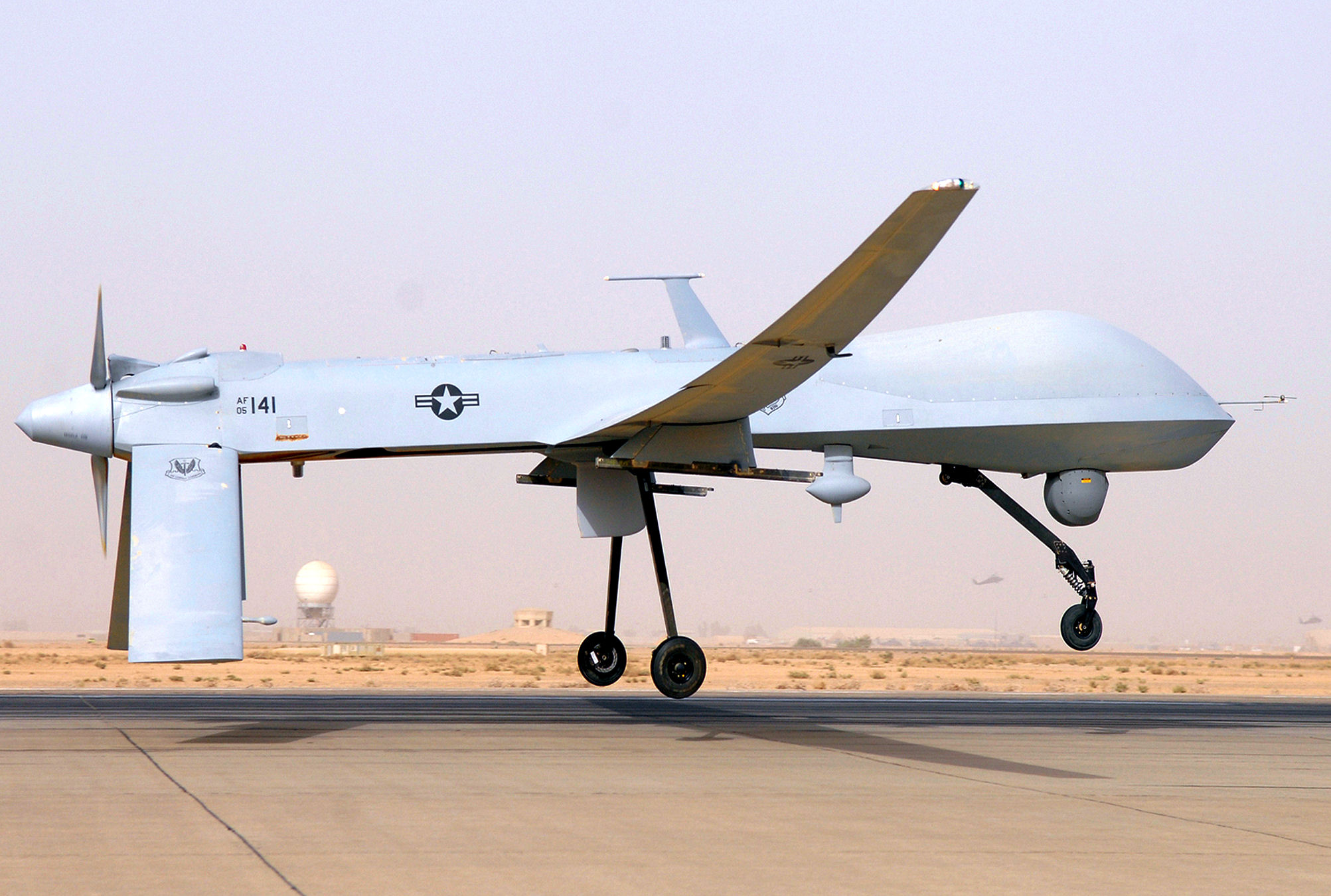
- General Atomics MQ-1 Predator UAV 05-3141 taking off
- Active: 1962-present
- Country: United States
- Allegiance: Ohio
- Branch: Air National Guard
- Role: Intelligence, surveillance, reconnaissance and operations support
- Part of: Ohio Air National Guard
- Garrison/HQ: Springfield Air National Guard Base, Ohio

Commanders
- Current commander: Colonel Kimberly A. Fitzgerald

Insignia
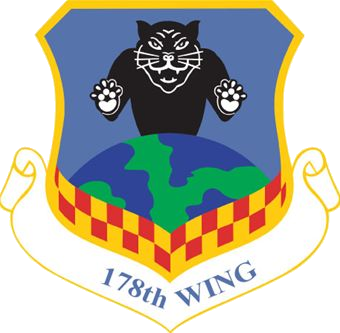
- 178th Wing emblem

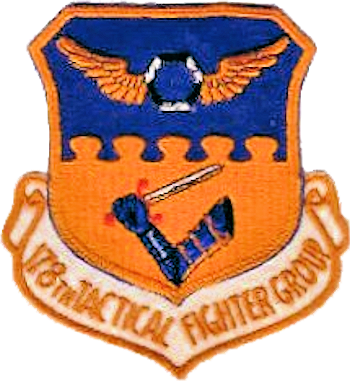
- Patch with 178th Tactical Fighter emblem

The 178th Wing is a unit of the Ohio Air National Guard, stationed at the Springfield-Beckley Municipal Airport ANG complex, Springfield, Ohio. If activated to federal service, the wing is gained by the United States Air Force (USAF) Air Combat Command (ACC), with elements of the wing gained by the Air Force Intelligence, Surveillance and Reconnaissance Agency (AFISRA).

== Mission ==
The 178th Wing transitioned from a Fighter Wing to an Intelligence Surveillance and Reconnaissance Wing. It supports MQ-1B Predator Unmanned Aerial Systems combat support sorties, which provide theater and national-level leadership with critical real-time intelligence, surveillance, and reconnaissance and air-to-ground munitions and strike capability. Also, the Air Support Operations Squadron provides terminal control for weapons employment in a close air support scenario integrating combat air and ground operations.

The Wing is under the control of the Air Combat Command. Pilots that are based in Springfield are able to fly MQ-1s on the other side of the world in Iraq or Afghanistan. The second component is under Administrative Control of the Ohio Air National Guard while Operationally Controlled by AFISRA Air Force Intelligence, Surveillance and Reconnaissance Agency and Directly supporting National Air and Space Intelligence Center, (NASIC).

== Units ==
The 178th Wing consists of four groups (178th Intelligence Group, 178th Operations Group, 178th Mission Support Group, and 178th Medical Group).

During the transition, the 178th Operations Group was re-designated as the 178th Reconnaissance Group and consists of the 162d Reconnaissance Squadron and the 178th Operational Support Squadron with 131 traditional and 81 full-time personnel.

The 178th Maintenance Group was reesignated as the 178th Intelligence Group with the Air Force ISR Agency (AFISRA) as the gaining major command.

In addition to its 900 personnel, the 178 Wing also supports 320 members of the Headquarters, 251st Communications Group, the 269th Combat Communications Squadron (both co-located with the 178 Wing), and the 123d Air Control Squadron, located in Cincinnati, Ohio.

== History ==
On 15 October 1962, the Ohio Air National Guard 162d Tactical Fighter Squadron was authorized to expand to a group level, and the 178th Tactical Fighter Group was established by the National Guard Bureau. The 162d TFS becoming the group's flying squadron. Other squadrons assigned into the group were the 178th Headquarters, 178th Material Squadron (Maintenance), 178th Combat Support Squadron, and the 178th USAF Dispensary.

=== Tactical Air Command ===
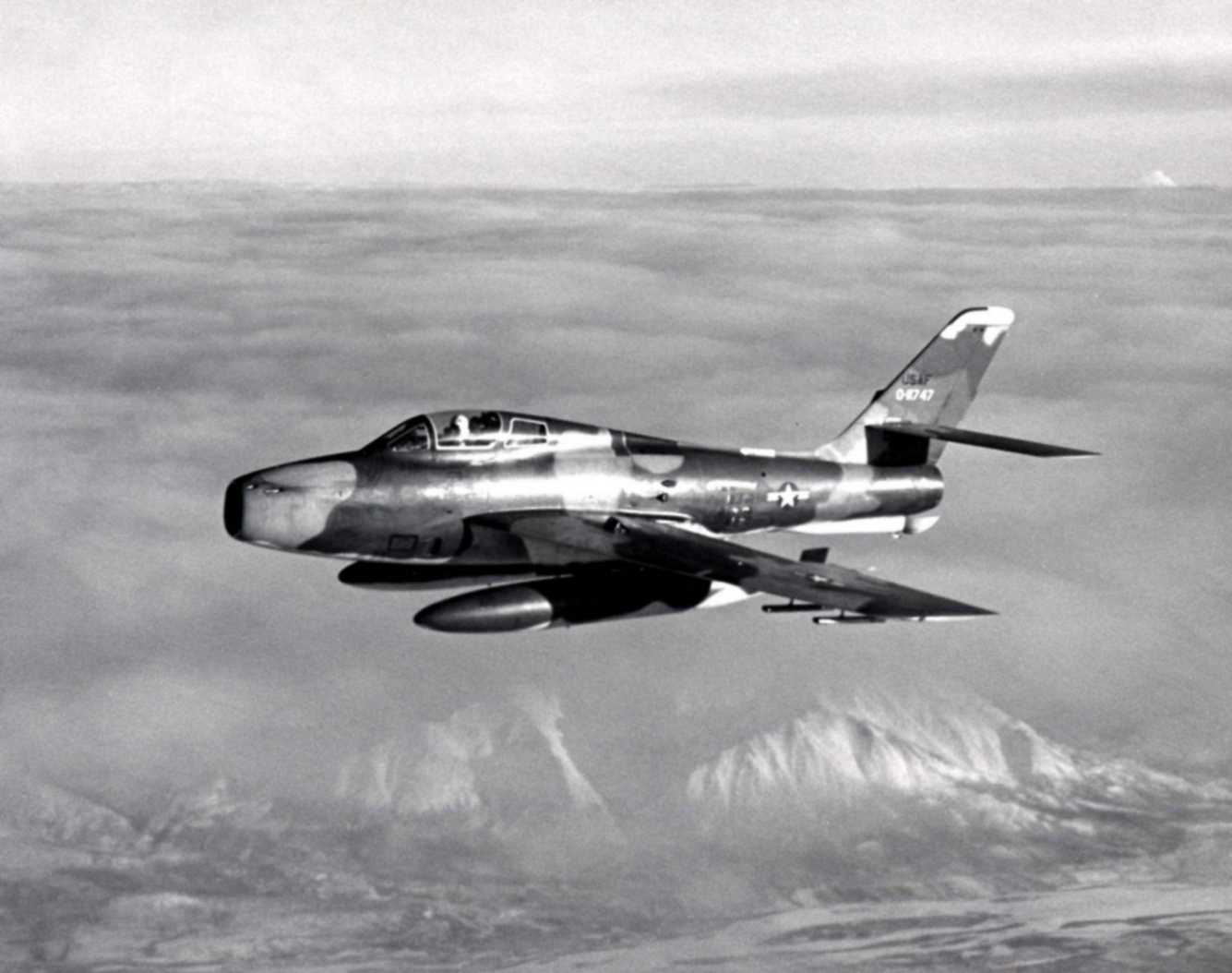
F-84F-25-RE Thunderstreak, AF Ser. No. 51-1747, of the 162nd Tactical Fighter Squadron, 178th Tactical Fighter Group, Ohio Air National Guard, during Operation "Punchcard IV", November 1968

Equipped with F-84F Thunderstreaks, the new group was assigned to the Ohio ANG 121st Tactical Fighter Wing at Lockbourne AFB, Ohio. The 178th TFG was tasked with a tactical fighter-bomber mission in support of Tactical Air Command (TAC).

In 1967, the 162d deployed to Hickam Air Force Base, Hawaii for Tropic Lighting III, an exercise designed to assist in the training of U.S. Army ground units prior to their deployment to South Vietnam. This deployment required two over-water aerial refuelings in either direction.

1968 was the first time the 162d participated in a North Atlantic Treaty Organization (NATO) exercise. It deployed to Greece, participating in Operation Deep Furrow 68 at Larissa Air Base. On this exercise fourteen F-84Fs were deployed, staging though Lajes Field, Azores and Torrejon Air Base, Spain. During Deep Furrow, they performed air-to-ground maneuvers with the United States Sixth Fleet. Upon their return, the 162d TFS deployed eight aircraft to Alaska in November for Operation Punch Card IV.

==== F-100 Super Sabre ====
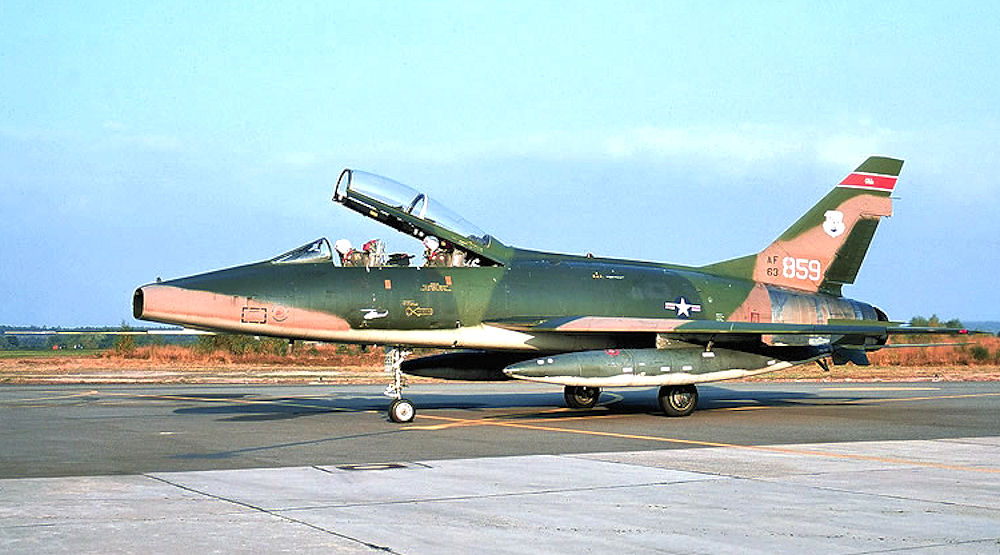
162d Tactical Fighter Squadron - North American F-100F Super Sabre, AF Ser. No. 56-3859, circa 1975

In the spring of 1970, the F-84F Thunderstreaks were sent to Davis-Monthan Air Force Base for storage, the squadron receiving Vietnam War veteran F-100D/F Super Sabres. Concentration on the qualifications of aircrews, munitions load crews and the attainment of a C-3 combat readiness rating were the primary objectives for 1971. The squadron achieved C-3 on 30 August, a "first" for F-100D-equipped Air Guard units. January 1972 saw the squadron in extensive practice for their pending 9th Air Force Operational Readiness Inspection (ORI). The ORI was conducted in March and the 9th Air Force did not agree with the unit's C-3 rating. A retake was scheduled in June, with the 162d coming away with the TAC-confirmed rating of C-1, the first F-100D squadron to achieve this feat.

During April 1973, the squadron participated in "Gallant Hand '73", a large-scale U.S. Readiness Command Joint Forces Training exercise at Fort Hood, Texas. Flying a 98 percent sortie rate. In August, the 162d took part in another joint training exercise called Operation Ember Dawn/Punch Card XIX at Eielson AFB, Alaska. In October, the TAC Unit Achievement Award was received for the fourth consecutive time, and the General Frank P. Lahm Air Safety Trophy was awarded for the second consecutive year.

31 May 1974 saw the 162d's accident-free flying streak end at 69 months when a pilot was forced to eject from his out-of-control F-100D. The unit participated in "Sentry Guard Strike V" at Volk Field, Wisconsin during 13–27 July the same year. In September 1975, the 162d was selected as a replacement for another unit to participate in NATO's Reforger 75 Cornet Razor exercise at Ramstein Air Base, West Germany as part of a series of NATO exercises called "Autumn Forge". Deploying thirteen F-100D aircraft, 162d pilots provided close air supportas the aggressor in exercise "Captain Trek", flying 121 sorties with 198 hours of flying time.

January 1976 saw the unit preparing for Operation Snowbird and the pending April ORI. "Snowbird" was conducted at Davis-Monthan AFB, Arizona. and was designed to give pilots favorable weather locations for clear weather flying opportunities. To provide its pilots with proficiency for real combat conditions, the 162d took part in Red Flag 77-9. Captain Edward J. Mechenbier, a former Vietnam War prisoner of war, was selected as the outstanding fighter pilot for 1977.

==== A-7D Corsair II ====
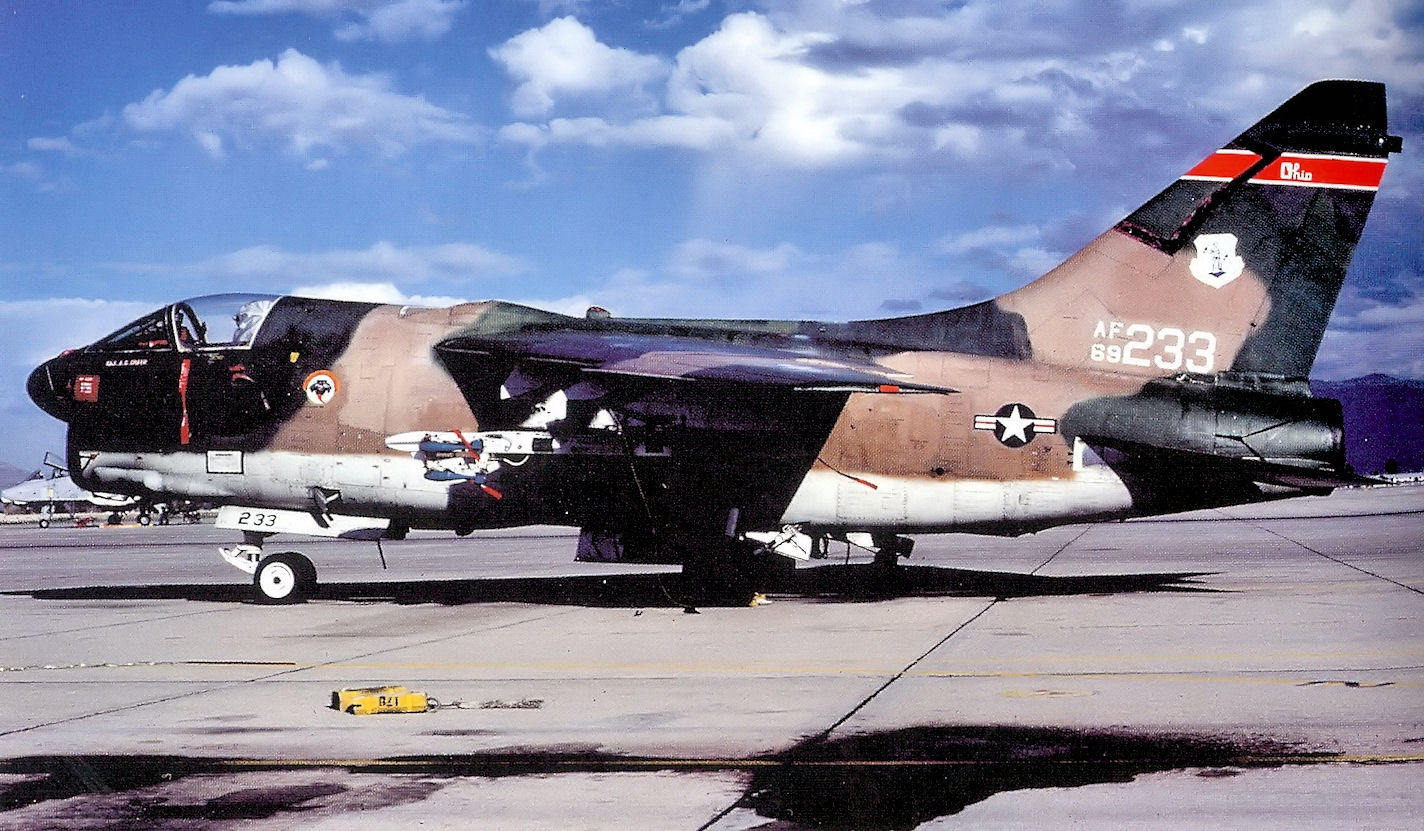
62d Tactical Fighter Squadron A-7D-5-CV Corsair II, AF Ser. No. 69-6233, in 1978

January 1978 initiated the conversion to the Vought Corporation's A-7D Corsair II attack aircraft. The conversion from the F-100 to the A-7 was accomplished in less than three months, the fastest ever for an Air Force or Air National Guard unit. The first major deployment with the A-7 was to Patrick AFB, Florida, on 12 August in support of forward air controller training. Also in 1978, the 162d participated in Exercise Red Flag 78-9 on 23 September, and "Tequilla Shooter" at Marine Corps Air Station Yuma, Arizona, from 14 to 20 November.

The first deployment in 1979 was Operation Snowbird again as 118 enlisted and 30 officers deployed to Davis-Monthan. in support of the exercise. "Sabre Sluff 79-2", a locally generated version of "Red Flag" was conducted at Springfield during 26–28 April, providing realistic training for the 162d's flying, communications, and radar control units. 13–15 September saw a second "Sabre Sluff" exercise, now known as "Buckeye Flag", carried out.

The 1980 exercise year started with "Empire Glacier" at Fort Drum, New York. The 162d was awarded the Air Force Outstanding Unit Award for its meritorious service from 1 March 1978 to 28 February 1979. In April, the 162nd was teamed with the 166th Tactical Fighter Squadron in support of exercise "Cope Elite". The exercise which was carried out at NAS Barbers Point, Hawaii, involved combat training for U.S. Army and Air Force units based in Hawaii.

In February 1981, Major John Smith commanded a six-aircraft deployment to the 49th TFW at Holloman AFB, New Mexico for dissimilar air combat training (DACT). In March, the squadron flew close air support missions for opposing forces during "Eagle Strike I", an exercise involving two brigades for the 101st Airborne Division at Fort Campbell, Kentucky. During the May exercise "Maple Flag 7", support was given to the Ohio ANG 112th Tactical Fighter Squadron for a 30-day rotation temporary duty to Howard Air Force Base, Panama. This deployment provided the only operational fighters in the Southern Command. In July, the 162nd participated in the Michigan-based combat readiness exercise "Sentry Buckeye XI", the first "Sentry Buckeye" to be flown from the Alpena Combat Readiness Training Center.

1982 was a busy year with the unit taking part in eight individual exercises, including "Red Flag 82-4" at Nellis AFB, Nevada. The 162d won the annual Ohio ANG "Turkey Shoot" competition in October at the Jefferson Proving Ground air-to-ground range. The squadron also celebrated its 35th anniversary with an open house and a military ball.

More deployments were in store for 1983, starting with "Coronet Castle" in April. In June, the 162nd completed five and one-half years of accident-free flying and earned the Tactical Air Command Flight Safety Award.

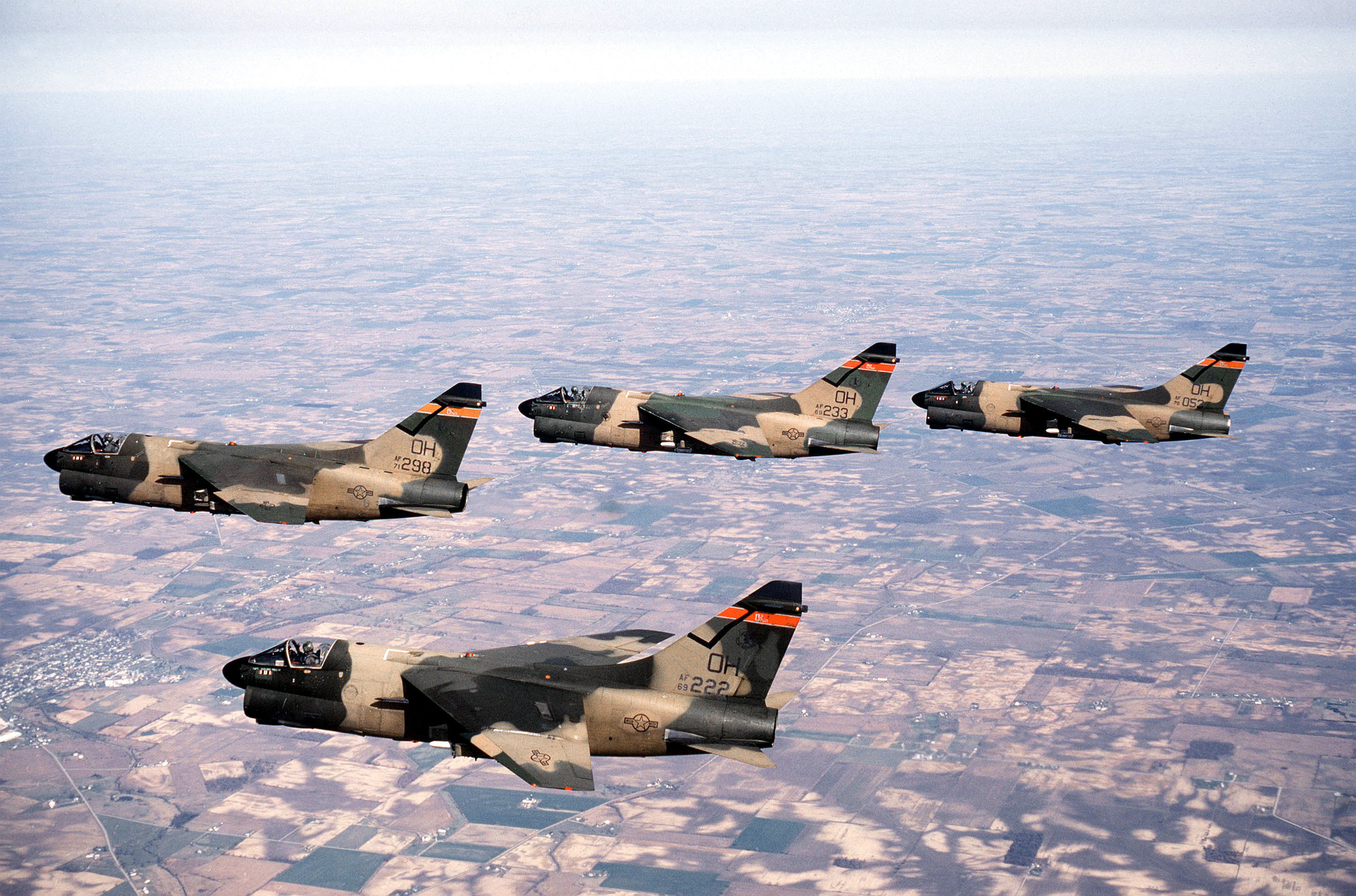
Four Ohio Air National Guard LTV A-7D Corsair II fighters from the 162d Tactical Fighter Squadron, 178th Tactical Fighter Group in flight during 1984. Aircraft identified as AF Ser. No. 69-6222, 69-6233, 70-1053, 71-1298.

1984's first deployment was the Panama rotation. In April, it was up to Canada for exercise "Maple Flag". The June "Sentry Buckeye" at Alpena Mich. pitted "friendly" forces against "aggressor" forces from the Missouri ANG 131st Tactical Fighter Wing, St. Louis. A deployment in December for another Operation Snowbird at Davis-Monthan AFB, Arizona. rounded out the year. A Red Flag exercise at Nellis AFB, Nevada was the first deployment for 1985. "Solid Shield", a joint exercise with the 166th TFS was conducted in May at the Naval Air Station, Key West, Florida. In June, it was off to the Panama Canal Zone for a deployment involving 50 personnel and four aircraft.

In 1986, DACT missions were conducted from January to April at various locations. Also in April, CAS sorties were flown for the Canadian Forces Operation School. "Coronet Miami", a six-week NATO exercise, was begun at RAF Sculthorpe, England. There the 162nd trained with military elements of NATO and the U.S. Air Forces in Europe. In November, 14 aircraft and 149 personnel supported "Operation Snowbird". The final 162nd deployment for 1986 was at CFB Chatham, New Brunswick. There, CAS missions were provided for the school that trains forward controller for the Canadian Armed Forces. With all of the flying, the 162nd ended the year with the prestigious Tappan Memorial Trophy, awarded to Ohio's outstanding Air National Guard Unit.

On 28 February 1987, the 162nd deployed five A-7D aircraft and 41 personnel to MacDill Air Force Base, Florida in support of the Ninth Air Force FAC training. In March 1987, the 162nd rotated to support Cornet Cove XII, a 30-day mission to Howard Air Force Base, Panama in which the 162nd maintained the only operational fighter in the Southern Air Command. Nine officers and 43 members deployed four A-7D aircraft to provide the 24th Composite Wing the support they needed.

In 1988, the 162nd took twelve aircraft to participate in SNOWBIRD for the December deployment that allowed the jets to schedule heavy air operations in Davis-Monthan. 1989 saw the 162nd participate in Panama for the 11th time in 19 years to support Coronet Cove. Nine officers and 46 enlisted provided five aircraft to support the 24th Composite Wing operations. In May 1989, the 162nd deployed in support of Coronet Pine I and II at RAF Sculthorpe, England. After a series of groundings, the 162nd deployed five aircraft and 295 personnel to participate in the major NATO Exercise Central Enterprise at RAF Boscombe Down, England.

In 1990, Operation Desert Storm saw 93 unit members deploy to the Middle East, but the A-7D aircraft remained in Ohio as by then, they were considered second-line aircraft, being replaced by the A-10 Thunderbolt II in front-line combat service. In September 1990, the 162nd deployed to the Alpena Combat Readiness Training Center, Michigan for field training. The 162nd ended 1990 at Davis-Monthan, in support of the December exercise SNOWBIRD. In March 1991, the 162nd deployed to the Gulfport Combat Readiness Training Center, Mississippi and flew a total of 219 sorties during the deployment exercise. In September 1991, the 162nd deployed seven aircraft to Nellis AFB, Nevada, to participate in Air Warrior exercise. The 162nd deployed again to support Exercise Snowbird at Davis-Monthan in November 1991. In 1992 the 162nd deployed to Savannah Air National Guard Base, Georgia to support practicing units for the William Tell competition and then traveled to Otis Air National Guard Base, Massachusetts for DACT training soon after.

In May 1993 the 162nd hosted a farewell to the A-7D Corsair II. The SLUF Salute was an Air Force sanctioned event to say farewell to this great aircraft that the 162nd flew from 1978 to 1993. The 162nd flew the last public demonstration of the A-7D Corsair II in the United States. While assigned to the unit, the aircraft flew a total of 55,357.4 hours.

==== Air Combat Command ====
In March 1992, the unit adopted the USAF Objective Wing organization and the 178th Tactical Fighter Group became simply the 178th Fighter Group; the 162d as a Fighter Squadron. On 1 June of that year, Tactical Air Command was inactivated as part of the Air Force re-organizing after the end of the Cold War. Air Combat Command (ACC) became the gaining major command for the 178th.

During May 1993 the squadron marked the end of 15 years of A-7D operations with the 162d Fighter Squadron. Later in the year the conversion to the Block 30 F-16C Fighting Falcon. The 162d took twelve F-16's, 20 pilots and over 600 personnel to Operation Winterbase at the Gulfport Combat Readiness Training Center, Mississippi, to perform flight training for the first big deployment with the new F-16Cs. During the month-long deployment, 30 aircrew certifications were attained and the sortie generation was the largest ever by the 178th Fighter Group. For Longshot 94, the 162d launched four F-16's in support of the competition. The mission was for the aircraft to rendezvous with the various units fly to Nellis to drop ordnance on target and on time. Opposing Red Air Enemy attempted to thwart the attack. The 162d was part of the outstanding 3rd place team.

In 1995, Operation Snowbird occurred in February, with the 162d flying 223 sorties for live weapons and desert combat simulations. Later in April 1995, the 162d provided Red Air for Tyndall Air Force Base, Florida air training in dissimilar air combat training called Longshot 95. In June 1995, the 162d deployed to Air Base Karup, Denmark to participate in NATO exercises Baltop 95 and Central Enterprise. The 162d provided Red Air for the Baltop exercise and flew 225 sorties in Central Enterprise with eight of the F-16 aircraft from the 162d.

On 11 October 1995, in accordance with the Air Force Obective Wing organization, the 178th Fighter Group was expanded and changed in status to the 178th Fighter Wing. The 162d Fighter Squadron was assigned to the 178th Operations Group. Support groups to the wing were the 178th Maintenance Group, 178th Mission Support Group and the 178th Medical Group. In December 1995, DACT training occurred again for the 162d at the Gulfport CRTC, Mississippi.

During the period of 1995 to 1998, the 162d took first place in the "Turkey Shoot" Competition in Indiana, taking on units from the Ohio ANG and other participating states showing the 162d skill and accuracy in air-to-ground employment.

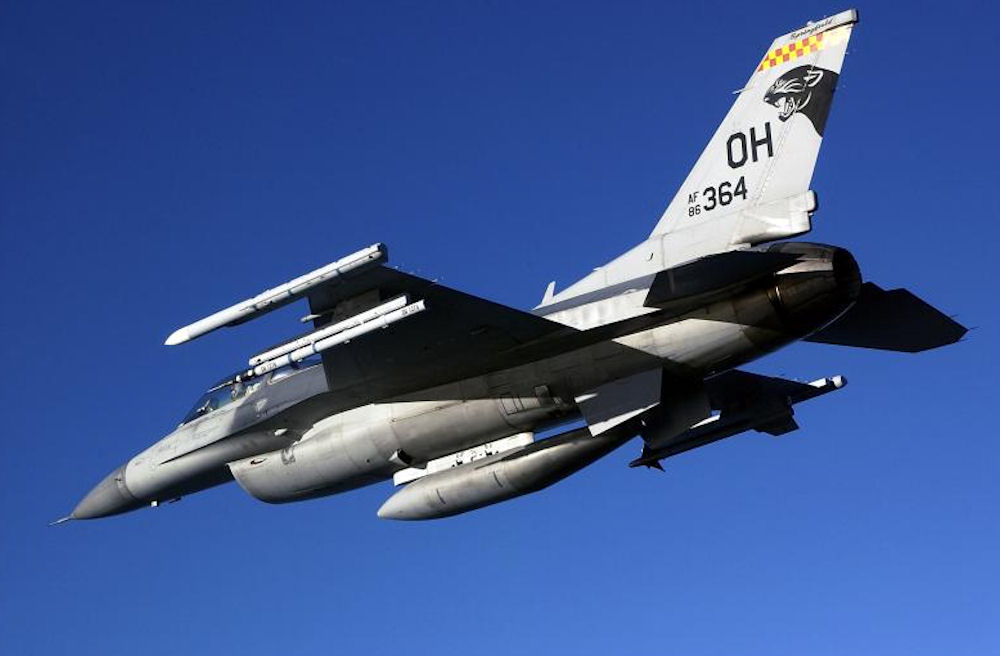
F-16C Block 30, AF Ser. No. 86-0364 from the 162 FS is on a training mission, armed with AIM-120 AMRAAM missiles, over Savannah, Georgia on 14 January 2003.

In mid-1996, the Air Force, in response to budget cuts, and changing world situations, began experimenting with Air Expeditionary organizations. The Air Expeditionary Force (AEF) concept was developed that would mix Active-Duty, Reserve and Air National Guard elements into a combined force. Instead of entire permanent units deploying as "Provisional" as in the 1991 Gulf War, Expeditionary units are composed of "aviation packages" from several wings, including active-duty Air Force, the Air Force Reserve Command and the Air National Guard, would be married together to carry out the assigned deployment rotation.

In August 1996, the 162d Expeditionary Fighter Squadron was first formed from 178th personnel and aircraft and deployed to Al Jaber Air Base, Kuwait to support Operation Southern Watch and Operation Desert Strike with the mission to enforce the southern no-fly zone imposed by the United Nations over Iraq. In 1997, the 162d Fighter Squadron deployed to Tyndall for a Combat Archer exercise to perform supersonic air-to-air combat with drones.

In May 1997, the 162 EFS was again formed, deploying to Incirlik Air Base, Turkey to support Operation Northern Watch. Later in 1997, the 162d Fighter Squadron invited past members to attend the 50th Anniversary Celebration of the squadron at Springfield. In 1998 the 162d deployed to Eielson Air Force Base, Alaska and underwent Exercise Cope Thunder arctic training.

==== Air Education and Training Command ====
In 1998 the mission of the 178th Fighter Wing was changed to become a flying training unit under Air Education and Training Command (AETC). Its new mission was to skillfully train and support Active Duty, Guard and Reserve F-16 pilots as an advanced flight training unit. Its gaining command was officially changed from Air Combat Command to AETC on 17 March 1999. As part of the new mission, the 162d received Block 30 F-16D twin-seat trainers which provided the aircraft required for training. Courses included the Basic Course, or also known as the B-course, which was for students who have never flown a fighter aircraft, but are graduates of Air Force Undergraduate Pilot Training. Students were put through an 8.5-month training module. This included in class time, simulator training and in-flight training.

In 2000 the 162d took their F-16's to Savannah Air National Guard Base, Georgia for annual training. In 2001, the 162d went back to Hickam for the first time in 20 years to participate in exercise Sentry Aloha 01.

In September 2001, while on Annual Training at the Alpena Combat Readiness Training Center, Michigan, the September 11 terrorist attack on the World Trade Center and the Pentagon occurred. The 162d flew numerous missions in support of homeland defense and for Operation Noble Eagle.

==== BRAC 2005 and closeout of F-16 operations ====
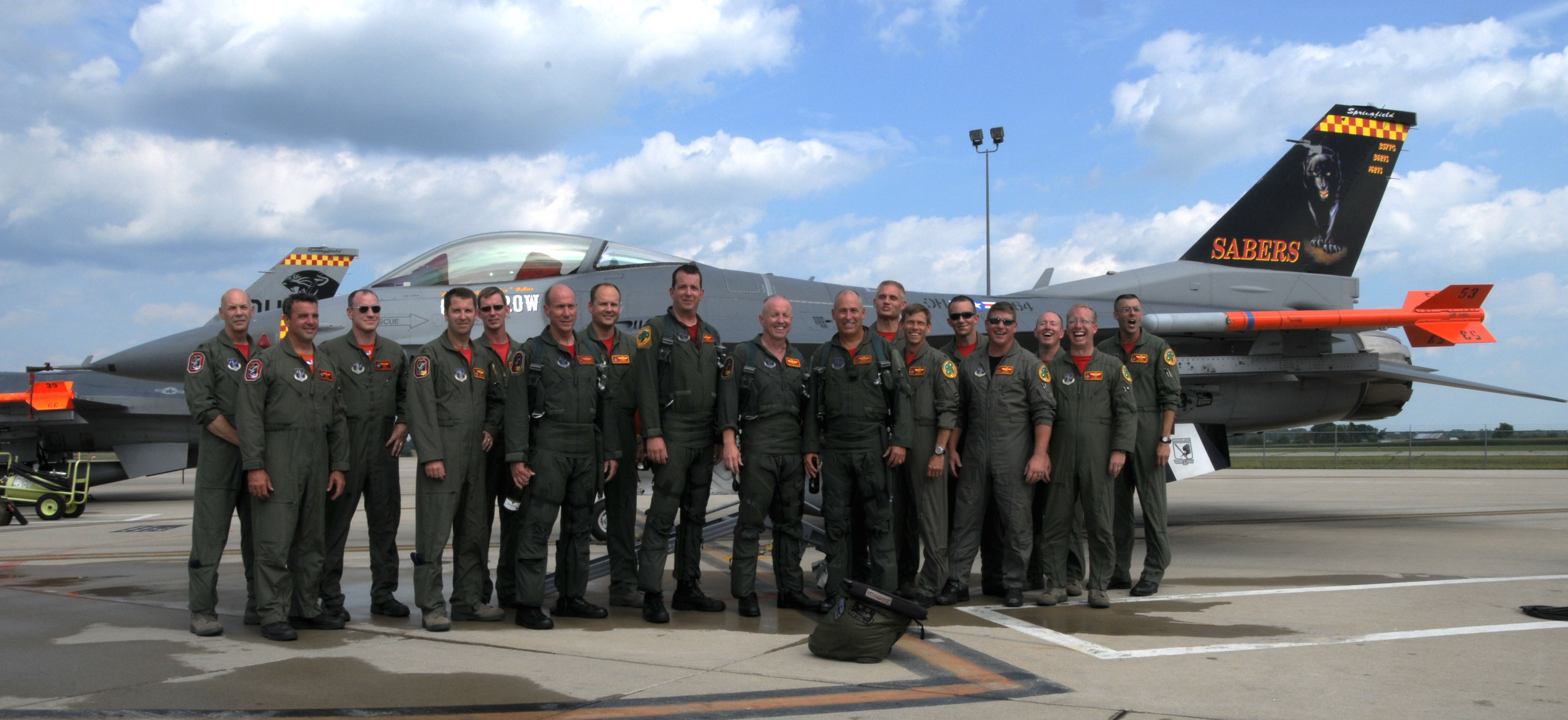
Pilots from the 178th FW gather in front of F-16C Block 30, AF Ser. No. 86-0364 from the 162nd FS on 30 July 2010 in Springfield, Ohio. It is the last time these pilots would fly together here at Springfield.

Under the 2005 Base Closure and Realignment Commission (BRAC), a decision came down that the parent 178th Fighter Wing would lose its sixteen F-16s and ultimately convert to a drone squadron. The Springfield aircraft would be distributed to the 132d Fighter Wing, Iowa Air National Guard, Des Moines IAP ANGS, IA (nine aircraft); the 140th Wing, Colorado Air National Guard, Buckley Air Force Base, Colorado (three aircraft) and 149th Fighter Wing, Texas Air National Guard, Lackland Air Force Base/Kelly Field, Texas (four aircraft). It was later revealed that the decision may have been a mistake as the 2005 BRAC decision did not take into account that the 162d was a training squadron, however the decision stood.

In the interim, through the Foreign Military Sales program, the 178th was able to obtain another training mission with the Royal Netherlands Air Force. In April 2007 the Dutch 306 Squadron F-16 detachment from Tucson Air National Guard Base, Arizona moved to Springfield to provide a different training environment. The detachment was not associated directly to the 162d FS. However the Springfield facilities were F-16 ready so as a result, when the 162d FS shut down their F-16 operations, the Dutch detachment would leave shortly after. The RNLAF training mission at Springfield ANGB ended in 2010 when the unit returned for Arizona. About 6 classes graduated out of the Dutch detachment while at Springfield.

The 162d FS graduated its final American F-16 Basic Course class on 12 December 2009. The class had started on 30 March 2009. In the squadron's tenure, as a training squadron, a total 77 pilots went through the B-course. Another 273 people went for pilots upgrading to operational or formal training instructor pilot. This made a total of 350 pilots that received any pilot training at Springfield.

Knowing the American training mission would be ending soon, the 178th pursued another foreign military training mission with the Singapore Air Force. However, in 2009 it became apparent that mission would not be coming to Springfield due to economic limitations.

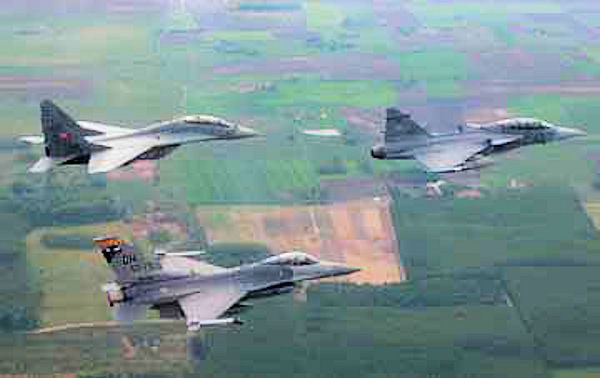
162d FS and Hungarian Air Force MiG-29 and SAAB Gripen

Just prior to the squadron closing out Viper operations, on 22 April 2010 the squadron had a more well received deployment in Hungary. The fifteen-day deployment allowed USAF F-16s to fly with Saab JAS 39 Gripens, MiG-29s and Mi-24s of the Hungarian Air Force. The American pilots and Hungarian AF pilots had the opportunity to engage in various air-to-air scenarios.

For the 162d FS the final sortie was on 30 July 2010. To celebrate the squadron's history, F-16C #86-0364 was painted up in special markings and incorporated some markings from the famous World War II era P-51 Mustang Old Crow. On the last flight four of the most senior pilots in the squadron with the most hours in the F-16 flew. The four pilots had a combined 100 years in fighters and topped out at 15,920 hours in fighters with 12,380 of those hours in the Viper.

Although the last sortie had been a few months earlier, the last American aircraft departed Springfield on 20 September 2010. This ended the manned flying mission of the 162d FS. The Dutch detachment was scheduled to return to Tucson ANGB, Arizona by January 2011. Instead they pulled out early and were gone from Springfield by 15 November 2010 when the last Dutch F-16 departed.

==== Reconnaissance mission ====
On May 7, 2010 the Department of Defense and Air Force decided to assign the 178th a new mission. They were made a ground control station for the General Atomics MQ-1 Predator. Along with this mission came the associated intelligence analysis mission. Conversion to the MQ-1 began in 2010.

The mission is under the control of Air Combat Command. Pilots based in Springfield can fly MQ-1s on the other side of the world. A second component works under the National Air and Space Intelligence Center on the associated intelligence mission.

=== Lineage ===
- Established as the 178th Tactical Fighter Group and allotted the National Guard on 11 September 1962

Activated and extended federal recognition on 15 October 1962
Redesignated 178th Fighter Group on 18 March 1992
Redesignated 178th Fighter Wing on 1 October 1995
Redesignated 178th Wing on 1 July 2014

=== Assignments ===
- 121st Tactical Fighter Wing (later 121st Air Refueling Wing), 15 October 1962
- Ohio Air National Guard, 11 October 1995

=== Gaining Command ===
- Tactical Air Command, 15 October 1962
- Air Combat Command, 1 July 1992 – present
- Elements gained by Air Force Intelligence, Surveillance and Reconnaissance Agency, 10 June 2010 – present

=== Components ===
- 178th Operations (later Reconnaissance) Group, 11 October 1995 – present
- 178th Intelligence, Surveillance and Reconnaissance Group, 1 July 2014 – present
- 162d Tactical Fighter Squadron (later 162d Fighter Squadron), 15 October 1962 – 1 October 1995

=== Stations ===
- Springfield Municipal Airport (later Springfield-Beckley Municipal Airport, Springfield Air National Guard Base), Ohio, 15 October 1962 – present

=== Aircraft ===
- F-84F Thunderstreak, 1962-1970
- F-100D/F Super Sabre, 1970-1978
- A-7D/K Corsair II, 1978-1993
- Block 30 F-16C Fighting Falcon, 1993-2010
- Block 30 F-16D Fighting Falcon, 1997-2010
- MQ-1 Predator, 2010–2017
- MQ-9 Reaper, 2017 – present
