= Empire Air Force Station =

1950–1978 radar site of the United States Air Force

Empire Air Force Station
- Part of Air Defense Command (ADC)

Site information
- Type: Air Force Station
- Code: ADC ID: P-34, NORAD ID: Z-34; Current JSS ID: J-58
- Controlled by: United States Air Force
- Condition: JSS/NEADS site

Location
- Location of Empire AFS, Michigan
- Coordinates: 44°48′09″N 086°03′11″W

Site history
- Built: 1950
- In use: 1950-1978

Garrison information
- Garrison: 752d Radar Squadron

Empire Air Force Station is a former United States Air Force Aerospace Defense Command (ADC) long range radar site located 0.7 miles (1.1 km) south-southeast of Empire, Michigan, in Empire Township. It was closed in 1978 by the Air Force, and turned over to the Federal Aviation Administration (FAA).

Today the site is part of the Joint Surveillance System (JSS), designated by NORAD as Northeast Air Defense Sector (NEADS) Ground Equipment Facility.

== History ==
The radar site was operated by the 752d Aircraft Control and Warning (AC&W) squadron, starting in late 1950. The unit operated and maintained an AN/CPS-6B radar at this site, and initially the station functioned as a Ground-Control Intercept (GCI) and warning station. As a GCI station, the squadron's role was to guide interceptor aircraft toward unidentified intruders picked up on the unit's radar scopes. In 1958 this radar was replaced by an AN/FPS-6. A second height-finder radar arrived a year later.

During 1960 Empire AFS joined the Semi Automatic Ground Environment (SAGE) system, initially feeding data to DC-14 at K. I. Sawyer AFB, Michigan. After joining, the squadron was re-designated as the 752d Radar Squadron (SAGE) on 15 July 1960. In 1963, Empire AFS was switched to the SAGE Data Center DC-06 at Custer AFS, Michigan. The radar squadron provided information 24/7 the SAGE Direction Center where it was analyzed to determine range, direction altitude speed and whether or not aircraft were friendly or hostile.

Also during 1960 Empire site began operating an AN/FPS-7 radar, and one of the AN/FPS-6 height-finder radars was supplanted by an AN/FPS-26A in 1963.

The Empire AFS site ID was changed to Z-34 when all SAGE radar squadron designations received the NORAD "Z" prefix on 31 July 1963.

In 1964 Empire site became an ADC/FAA (Federal Aviation Administration) Joint Surveillance System (JSS) site.

In addition to the main facility, Empire operated two AN/FPS-18 gap-filler sites:

- Petoskey, MI (P-34A/Z-34A) 45°19′37″N 084°53′03″W
- Alpena, MI (P-34E/Z-34E) 45°04′16″N 083°34′03″W

Control of two more gap-fillers was transferred to the 752d from the 781st Radar Squadron (SAGE) at Custer AFS on 27 January 1965 as the 781st was being inactivated.

- Saugatuck, MI (P-67C/Z-67C/Z-34G) 42°39′41″N 086°12′33″W
- Shelby, MI (P-67D/Z-67D/Z-34H) 43°36′00″N 086°20′25″W

Of the four gap-filler radars once under the control of Empire AFS, only the Saugatuck annex still stands basically as it did while in operation. In fact, of all of the radars in the SAGE system, gap-filler or long-range, the Saugatuck annex appears to be the last site in public hands that is nearly completely intact with all of the Cold War era electronic equipment still in place in both the building and tower.

Over the years, the equipment at Empire AFS was upgraded or modified to improve the efficiency and accuracy of the information gathered by the radars. The 752d Radar Squadron (SAGE) was inactivated in April 1978, and the AN/FPS-26A height-finder was decommissioned in this time frame.

The FAA assumed control of the radar operations area except for the AN/FPS-6 height-finder radar (now modified to the AN/FPS-116 variant). The National Park Service assumed control of the rest of the property, which is now part of Sleeping Bear Dunes National Lakeshore. Circa 1980 or 1981, the AN/FPS-7 search radar was replaced by an FAA model ARSR-3 search radar. The AN/FPS-116 height-finder radar was removed c. 1988. The ARSR-3 was replaced by an ARSR-4 in the late 1990s.

Many of the veterans of this site still reside in the area and in Traverse City, Michigan, approximately 26 miles (42 km) east of Empire. The museum in Empire has a full history of the air station, including a historical marker and the original rock marker for the Dining Hall on display. Reunions are held annually for the veterans of Empire AFS.

== Air Force units and assignments ==
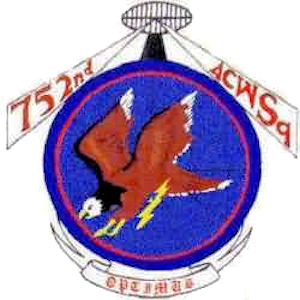
Emblem of the 752d Aircraft Control and Warning Squadron

=== Units ===
- Constituted as the 752d Aircraft Control and Warning Squadron on 14 November 1950

Activated on 27 November 1950
Redesignated as the 752d Radar Squadron (SAGE) on 15 July 1960
Redesignated as the 752d Radar Squadron on 1 February 1974
Inactivated on 1 April 1978

=== Assignments ===
- 541st Aircraft Control and Warning Group, 27 November 1950
- 30th Air Division, 6 February 1952
- 4708th Defense Wing 16 February 1953
- 4706th Air Defense Wing, 1 March 1956
- 37th Air Division, 8 July 1956
- 30th Air Division, 1 April 1959
- Sault Sainte Marie Air Defense Sector, 1 April 1960
- Detroit Air Defense Sector, 15 July 1963
- 34th Air Division, 1 April 1966
- 29th Air Division, 14 November 1966
- 23d Air Division, 19 November 1969 – 1 April 1978

== See also ==
- List of USAF Aerospace Defense Command General Surveillance Radar Stations
- List of United States Air Force aircraft control and warning squadrons
