= 13th Fighter Squadron (disambiguation) =

The 13th Fighter Squadron is an active United States Air Force Unit, originally constituted as the 13th Tactical Fighter Squadron in May 1966. It has held its present designation since May 1991.

13th Fighter Squadron may also refer to the following United States Air Force units:

- The 13th Bomb Squadron, organized as the 13th Aero Squadron in June 1917, and designated 13th Fighter Squadron from July to September 1973.
- The 13th Fighter-Interceptor Squadron, constituted as the 13th Pursuit Squadron (Interceptor) and designated the 13th Fighter Squadron from May 1942 to May 1944.
