= 677th Aircraft Control and Warning Squadron =

- Active: 1953-1957
- Country: United States
- Branch: United States Air Force
- Type: General Radar Surveillance

The 677th Aircraft Control and Warning Squadron is an inactive United States Air Force unit. It was last assigned to the 30th Air Division, Air Defense Command, stationed at Alpena Air Force Station, Michigan. It was inactivated on 30 November 1957.

The unit was a General Surveillance Radar squadron providing for the air defense of the United States.

== Lineage ==
- Established as 677th Aircraft Control and Warning Squadron

Activated on 1 September 1953
Inactivated on 30 November 1957

== Assignments ==
- 4711th Defense Wing, 1 September 1953
- 4708th Defense Wing, 5 May 1954
- 30th Air Division, 8 July 1956 – 30 November 1957

== Stations ==
- Fort Williams, Maine, 1 September 1953
- Willow Run AFS, Michigan, 1 April 1954 (not manned or equipped)
- Alpena AFS, Michigan, 1 December 1954 – 30 November 1957
