= Alpena Combat Readiness Training Center =

Michigan Air National Guard training facility

Alpena Combat Readiness Training Center
- Part of Michigan Air National Guard (MI ANG)
- 45.0827° N, 83.5689° W
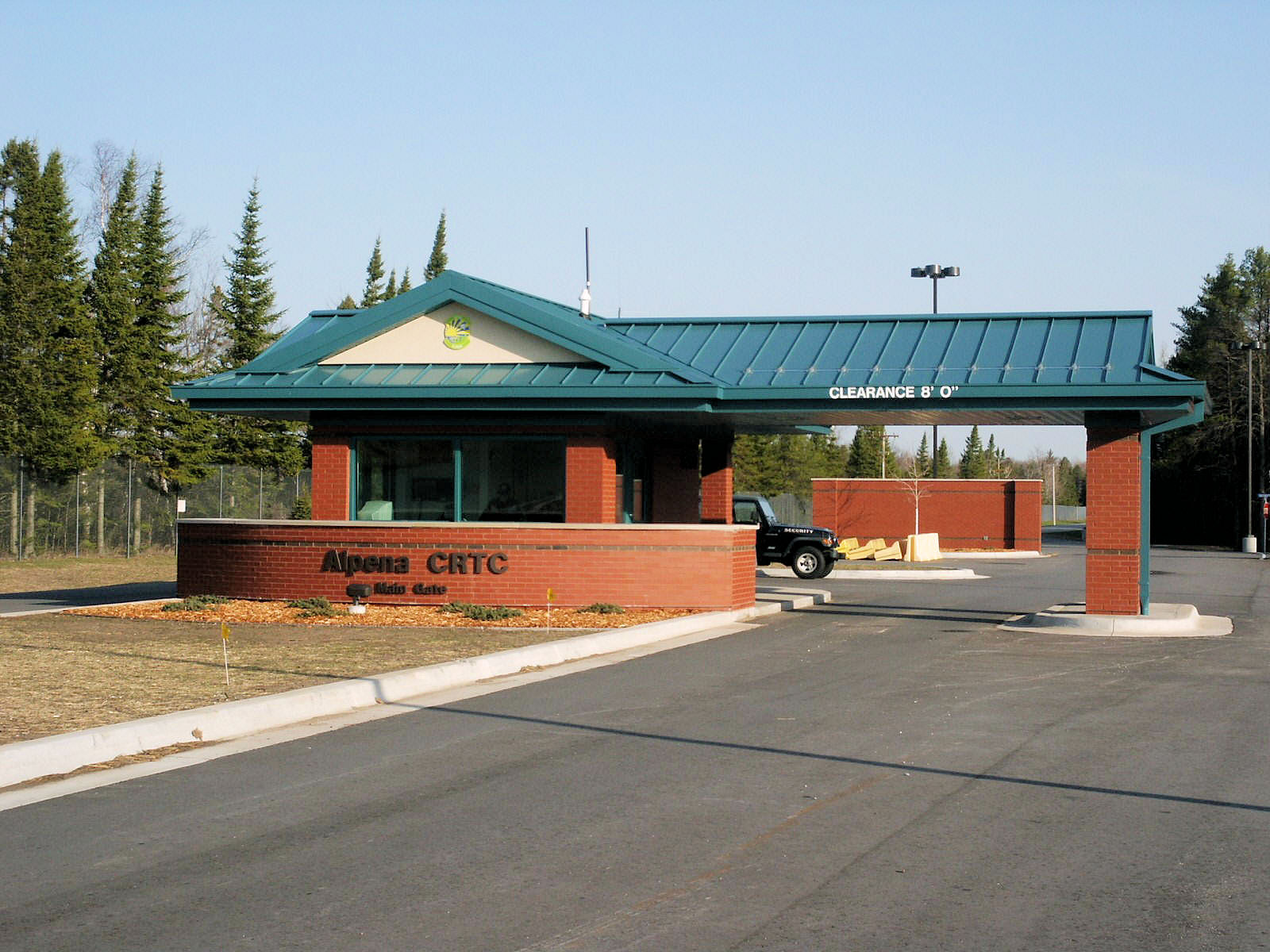
- Alpena Combat Readiness Training Center Main Gate

Site information
- Type: Training Center
- Code: ICAO: KAPN
- Owner: United States Air Force
- Controlled by: Air National Guard

Location
- Coordinates: 45°05′10″N 083°34′25″W

Site history
- Built: 1937
- Built by: Works Project Administration
- In use: 1941–1945; 1954 – present

Garrison information
- Current commander: Colonel Michael Whitefoot (2024-Present)
- Garrison: Michigan Air National Guard

Alpena Combat Readiness Training Center is a Michigan Air National Guard training facility. It is located 7.1 miles (11.4 km) west-northwest of Alpena, Michigan.

== Overview ==
The Alpena CRTC is a year-round training facility. It provides premier support, facilities, instruction and airspace to Department of Defense, Department of Homeland Security, Coalition and emergency responders to meet the mission requirements of combatant commanders and civil authorities.

It is one of four Combat Readiness Training Centers in the United States. (The others are at Volk Field in Wisconsin; Gulfport, Mississippi; and Savannah, Georgia.) The Alpena CRTC boasts the largest airspace east of the Mississippi River, has 147,000 acres available for ground maneuver units, and trains over 20,000 joint and coalition personnel annually.

The Alpena CRTC is the second organization in the Air National Guard to be certified as a Joint National Training Center. The base has three JTE's, offers JTAC Training, and operates a JTAC 4m dome simulator.

The Alpena County Regional Airport is a shared use airport between the Alpena CRTC and the Alpena County, allowing for both civilian aircraft operations and military aircraft operations.

== Mission statement ==
"Our mission at the Alpena Combat Readiness Training Center (CRTC) is to provide premiere support, facilities, instruction, and airspace to the Department of Defense, Department of Homeland Security, Coalition Forces, and Emergency Responders in order to meet the mission requirements of Combatant Commanders and Civil Authorities."

== History ==
Around 1930, an area of 80 acres was donated by Harry Fletcher and Phillip Fletcher. Several other 40 acres plots donated by Alpena Power Company. Soon after, Works Progress Administration (WPA) crews flattened and cleared what would become its first runway.

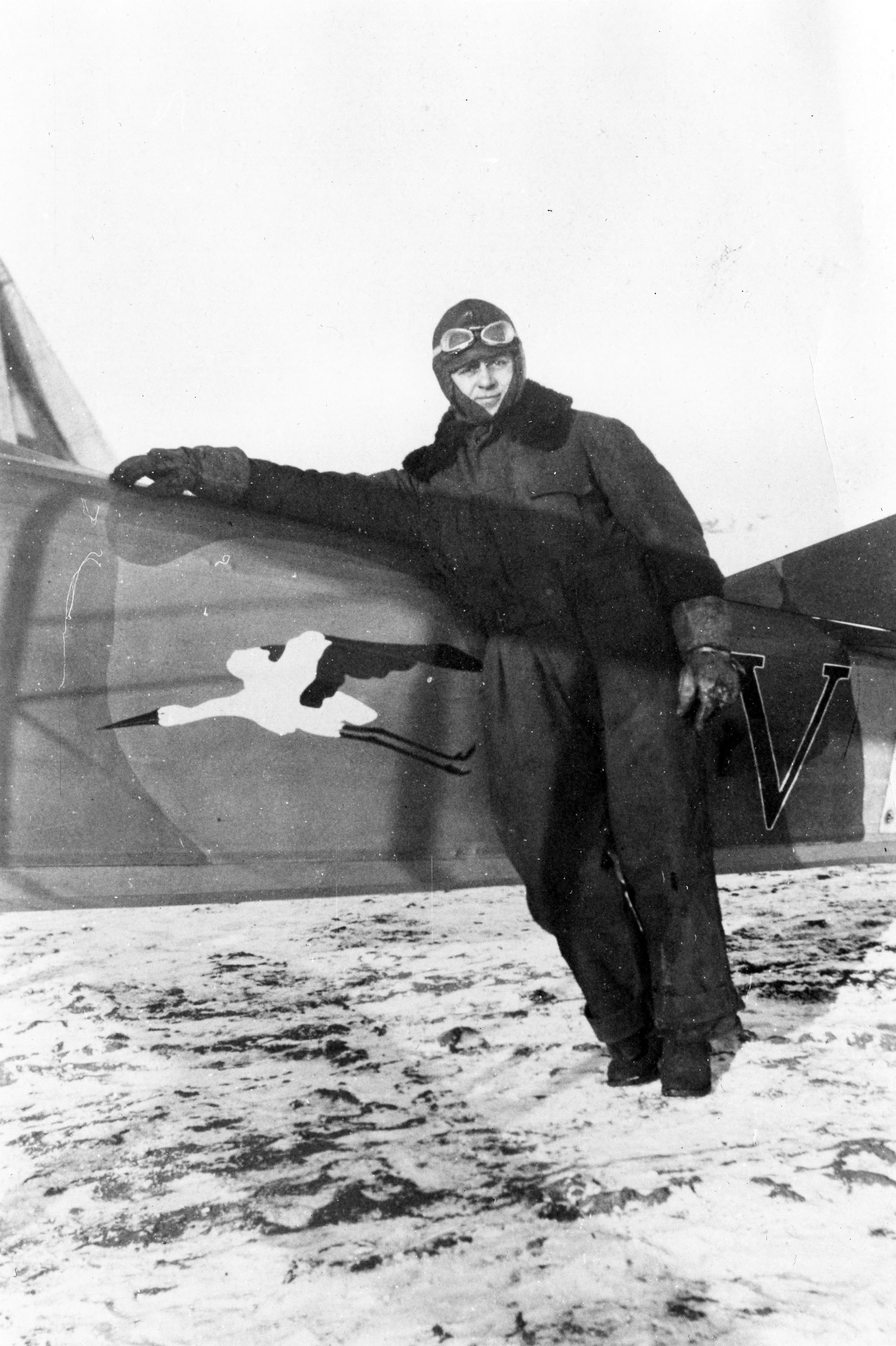
Phelps Collins, while with the French Escadrille 103, in front of Spad XII at Beauzée-sur-Aire, France

On 31 August 1931, the airport was formally dedicated as Captain Phelps Collins Field in honor of Captain Phelps Collins, the first member of the US Air Service to die on a combat mission in World War I. Governor Wilber M. Brucker flew in to formally accept the Airport and it became Michigan's first State owned airport.

Construction of the first hangar, a 40x90 foot structure built of cobblestone, began in 1935 and was completed in 1937. It could accommodate four Grumman FF-1s.

The 1st Pursuit Group out of Selfridge Field originally practiced near Oscoda, Michigan, however, upon completion of the new airfield, they used the site for aerial maneuvers and gunnery, along with housing their personnel nearby.

In 1940, 400 to 500 Selfridge personnel trained at Phelps Collins with a complement of 35 Seversky P-35's. The next year they brought P-40 Warhawks and the first P-38's Lockheed Lightning fighters.

=== World War II ===
As a result of World War II, the demand for training facilities became crucial and so the field was taken over by the War Assets Administration. The rough landing strip was replaced by a military airfield, with construction beginning on 29 July 1942. When completed, Alpena Army Airfield consisted of three hard-surfaced concrete runways (5000x150 (01/19), 5030x150 (70/250), and 5030x150 (16/34). Improvements included: housing for 2,000 personnel, two mess halls, operation buildings, a hospital and three runways over a mile long and 150 feet wide. Actual construction began in 1942. This was a big project for Alpena. By this time the total acreage of the base had increased to 2,500 acres. It was activated on 19 April 1943.

The planned use of the base, along with training military personnel, was to provide air defense for the Soo Locks. Controlled by the 4250th Army Air Force Base Unit. the airfield was initially assigned to Air Transport Command as a training base for long range transport pilots. In addition, the base was also tasked with certifying and training a pool of new pilots resulting from the P-47 Thunderbolt modifications for staging out aircraft to overseas bases.

It operated two sub-bases, one being Kinross Army Airfield, which later became the Strategic Air Command Kincheloe Air Force Base and Raco Army Airfield, which later became an Air Defense Command CIM-10 Bomarc surface-to-air missile site during the Cold War.

It was transferred to Air Technical Service Command in late 1944 when the ATC training program was wound down. Designated as Alpena Army Air Base, the facility was a maintenance and overhaul facility for B-24 Liberator bombers produced by Ford at its Willow Run, Michigan aircraft manufacturing plant. Aircraft would be sent to Alpena for modifications prior to their deployment to overseas combat units.

=== Postwar era ===
In 1946, Alpena Army Air Base was declared surplus and turned over to the War Assets Administration for disposition. It became Alpena County Regional Airport. Many of the buildings constructed in 1942 were stripped down and auctioned off and the only buildings left standing were the hospital area and big hangar built in 1943. Some of the barracks (which were very small) were sold off and moved. Some were placed in neighborhoods on Alpena's North side and were converted into private residences.

=== Air Defense Command ===

Alpena Air Force Station (ADC ID: M-105) was established in 1954 by the United States Air Force Air Defense Command as one of a planned deployment of forty-four Mobile radar stations to support the permanent ADC Radar network in the United States sited around the perimeter of the country. This deployment was projected to be operational by mid-1952. Funding, constant site changes, construction, and equipment delivery delayed deployment.

Exercising a right of return to the facility, ADC constructed the radar station on the northwest corner of the airport on the grounds of the former Army Air Base ground station. This site became operational in December 1954 when the 677th Aircraft Control and Warning Squadron was moved to the new station from Willow Run Air Force Station, Michigan. Beneficial occupancy was achieved at this Phase I mobile radar site in late 1954. Operations began in 1956, with an AN/TPS-1D radar, and initially the station functioned as a Ground-Control Intercept (GCI) and warning station. As a GCI station, the squadron's role was to guide interceptor aircraft toward unidentified intruders picked up on the unit's radar scopes.

Budget cuts forced the station to close in 1957. It was then replaced by an unmanned gap-filler radar site, designated P-34E with an AN/FPS-18 radar, located on the southwest side of the airport. It was operated as such by the 752d Radar Squadron at Empire AFS, Michigan from June 1960 until June 1968.

Today, a few buildings remain of the ADC Radar Station, and the FPS-18 support building remains of the Gap Filler site.

=== Air National Guard use ===
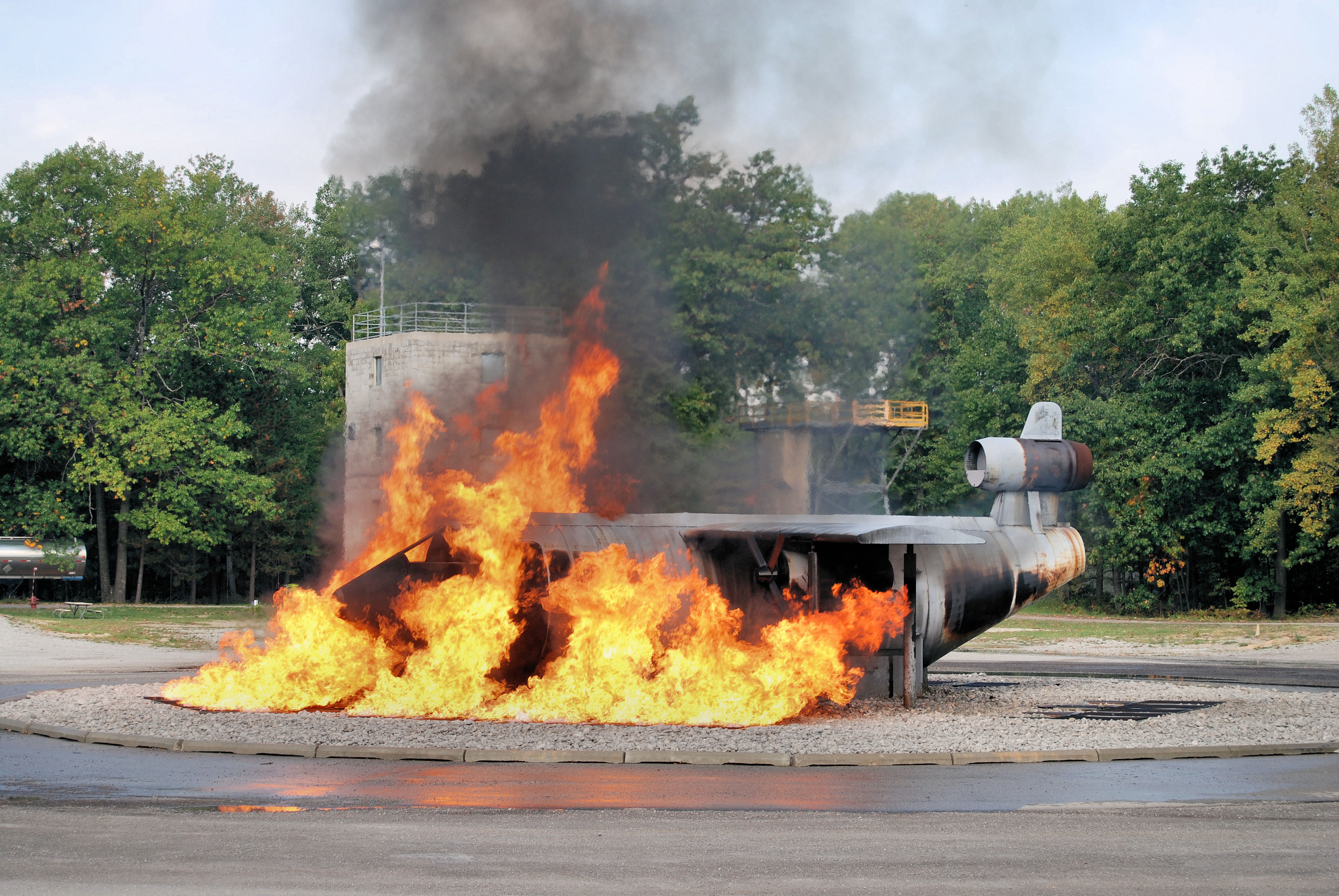
An aircraft firefighting simulator at Alpena CRTC

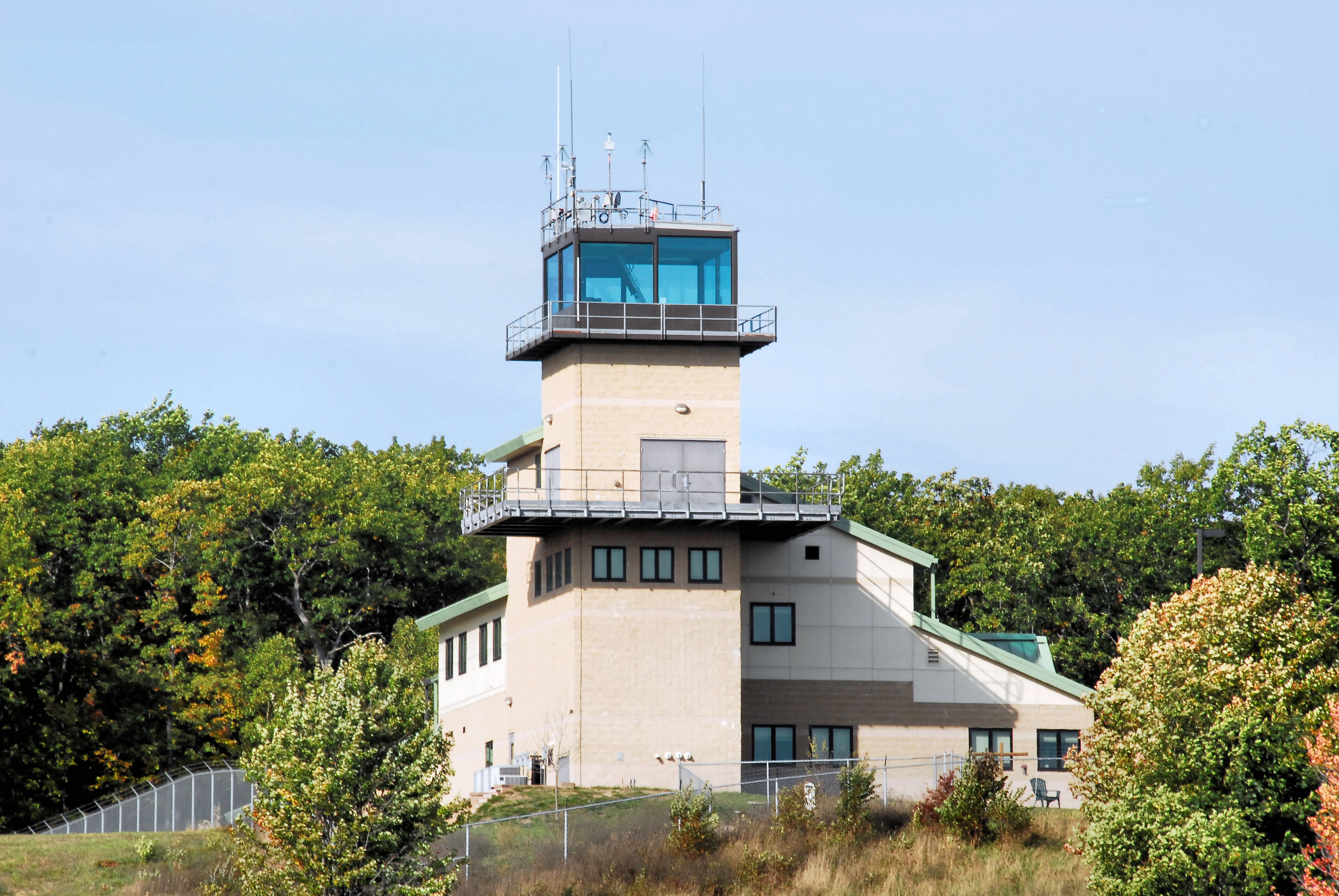
The Grayling Air Gunnery Range provides over 147,000 acres of joint use ground maneuver and impact range space.

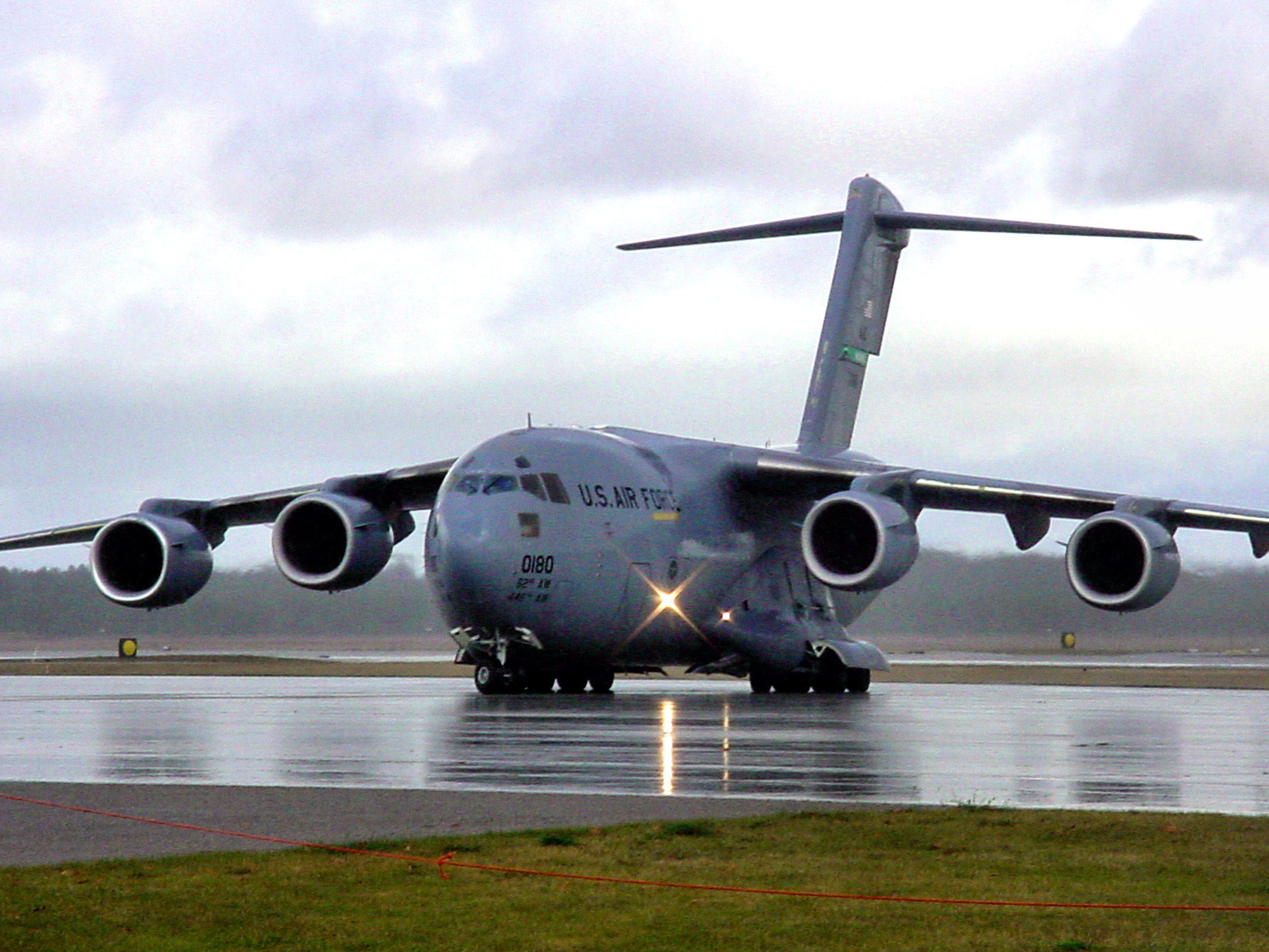
A C-17 Globemaster III taxi's during Crisis Look 2v004, an exercise at the Alpena Combat Readiness Training Center.

By January 1952, plans were in place to have joint use with the civilian airport. The facility would be instated as an ANG Permanent Field Training Site (PFTS).

Once the ANG took over the site, they completed another round of construction projects totaling $2.5M dollars. Sixty-two concrete block buildings were built including two dining facilities and barracks to house 2,000 men. The north–south runway was extended to 8,000 feet. Most of the day-to-day operations were performed by the Alpena County Road Commission still occupying a few building on the base.

During the 1960s, the runway taxiways were extended and an air traffic control tower was added. Also during that decade, the Air Defense Command Detachment from Wurtsmith AFB, Oscoda Michigan, had 60 persons permanently stationed here in Alpena until 1972/73 at which time their unit was discontinued.

The original military personnel assigned in 1953 totaled seven individuals and an additional two military and two Federal Civil Service personnel were added the following year. The next major personnel change was in 1979 when the military personnel had their status changed from Federal Civil Service Technicians to Active Guard Reservists (AGR). About that time the civilians employed on the base became Michigan State Civil Servants.

In the early 1960s, the Grayling Air-to-Ground Gunnery Range Negotiations began and early during the decade the range was constructed on 1,900 acres near Grayling, Michigan. Soon after, aircraft could be seen using the site to fly sorties for aircraft gunnery and bombing exercises. This added asset increased the usage and value of the base immensely.

Units from all over the United States come annually to train, with Air National Guardsman totaling in the tens of thousands. In 1991, the site was renamed the Alpena Combat Readiness Training Center (CRTC). This new title was more in line with the base mission of "combat training".

With the closing of Wurtsmith AFB in 1993, the need for radar approach and control was assigned to the CRTC. Equipment and personnel to operate it were added to the facility. The mission of the CRTC was increased with the additional tasking of running an ANG Medical Readiness Training School. The schoolhouse was designed to train ANG medical units for field operations. Both of these programs added personnel to the workforce and the number of employees, military and civilian, was over 100 persons.

Construction in the early 1990s was ongoing, with a major emphasis on upgrading the 1950s barracks and latrines to current standards. Thus a $3.8 million dormitory upgrade project begun and office buildings and officer quarters were all remodeled.

During the period, under the command of Col Thomas G. Cutler, the base created a long range plan including a new dining facility, fire station, operations facility, squadron operations (office) buildings, a convention center, a new facility at the Grayling Range and new dormitories.

In 1991, another tasking was added to the mission when the Air Combat Maneuver Instrumentation (ACMI) was instated. This system involves computerized communication between the aircraft and a computer satellite, providing full mission replay.

With the addition of the Fire Training Site and MOUT City in early 2000, the CRTC hosts several Fireman Schools and numerous law enforcement training courses annually.

Although the CRTC's core mission is to train ANG units, other military train here regularly. Air Force, Army, Navy Seals Marines and Latvian and Italian military have trained at the site. In recent years the CRTC has opened its gate to numerous non-profit organizations. It is not uncommon to see canine training, emergency response training along with other training maneuvers running all at the same time. Youth programs have expanded from the traditional Civil Air Patrol Cadets to include ROTC, JRROTC, Boy Scouts of America/Girl Scouts of the USA, Freedom Academy Students, Michigan Youth Camp Cadets.

With the addition of 26 Traditional Guardsman positions in 2000, the number of total base personnel now is over 200 employees. AGRs, Traditional Guardsman, Michigan State Civil Service and contracted employees make up the group. Military members come from all over the United States as well as local residents. Prior to their assignment at the base, many personnel have served the Army, Air Force, Navy and Marines.

Personnel have been called to give aid for local area flooding and deployed to Hurricane Katrina relief mission. Many have volunteered and been deployed overseas in support of operations: Desert Storm, Desert Shield, Iraqi Freedom, Joint Force, Jump Start, Enduring Freedom, Northern Watch, Northern Eagle and Deep Freeze.

In 2013 manpower reductions took place with the closing of the Medical Readiness Training Site (MRTS). This closing was part of a reduction in manpower directed by the USAF and ANG. The closing of the MRTS constituted a loss of 14 enlisted and two officers.

The Alpena CRTC also faced manpower reductions in 2013. The vehicle maintenance shop has faced manpower reductions. The Alpena CRTC Supply has been reduced to two members. The total loss of manpower in 2013 was over 25 enlisted members.

Since 2012, the Alpena CRTC has participated in one of the many Department of Defense's multinational exercises called exercise Northern Strike. This exercise is one of the largest reserve component exercises designed to ensure members of the United States military, as well as other nation's military's train together to accomplish mission essential tasks and training for preparation of the future wartime environment with future adversaries. This exercise is designed to replicate a modern-wartime environment, utilizing aerial live-fire ranges to simulate close air support, as well as other mission essential tasks such as emergency response and testing air mobility capabilities.

In 2017, Captain Brett DeVries, assigned to 107th Fighter Squadron in the Michigan Air National Guard, crash landed an A-10 at the Alpena Regional County Airport after the canopy of the aircraft had been removed and the landing gear would not extend down.

Northern Strike 2021 Exercise the Alpena CRTC hosted the Arizona Air National Guard's MQ-9 Reaper, an unmanned aircraft system (UAS) that is utilized for aerial reconnaissance, close air support, and aerial precision strikes. During Northern Strike Exercise the United States Air Force tested the capabilities of an upcoming technology called the 'Ground Based Detect and Avoid system (GBDAA) at the Alpena CRTC.

In 2021, for the first time in United States history the United States Air Force had conducted the operation of landing an aircraft on a US highway. This operation was conducted at the Alpena CRTC to show United States adversaries that the United States Air Force has the capability to land on highways and continue to be an effective fighting force as long as there are roads to land on. This proof of concept was intended to prove if the US military could operate at any location, anytime. The US Air Force, and Michigan Air National Guard landed four A-10 Thunderbolt II's assigned to the 354th Fighter Squadron, and the Michigan Air National Guard's 127th Wing. An additional two C-146 Wolfhounds, assigned to the Air Force Special Operations Command also participated in this highway landing operation.

In 2021, the Alpena CRTC participated in an Air Mobility Command and hosted exercise Mobility Guardian, an exercise where the United States Air Force tests its Agile Combat Employment (ACE) capabilities, as well as its Rapid Global Mobility capabilities with 18 air mobility aircraft at six different military locations. This exercise was designed to test the capabilities the United States Air Force has when it comes to the movement of personnel and equipment in high-stress combat rich environments. Furthermore, this exercise tested the US military's capabilities in a combat environment to refuel and rearm aircraft. Additionally, a Contingency Location Team (CLT) and an Air Force special tactics team simulated an airfield seizure at the Alpena CRTC further proving the US Military's Agile Combat Employment Capabilities. Exercise Mobility Guardian was conducted in preparation for a potential wartime environment with a developed nation or adversary.

The Winter Strike 2022 Exercise at Grayling Range, attached to the Alpena CRTC, was a multinational joint exercise between the Michigan Air National Guard and the Latvian military during the winter of 2021. Winter Strike exercise provides training for visiting units to acclimate to the demanding winter weather and to maintain wartime readiness regardless of the climate.

In February 2026, the U.S. Army and National Guard Bureau designated Camp Grayling's National All-Domain Warfighting Center, which encompasses the Alpena CRTC, as a national range for uncrewed aerial systems testing and training.

== See also ==
- United States general surveillance radar stations
