= Detroit Air Defense Sector =

Inactive United States Air Force organization

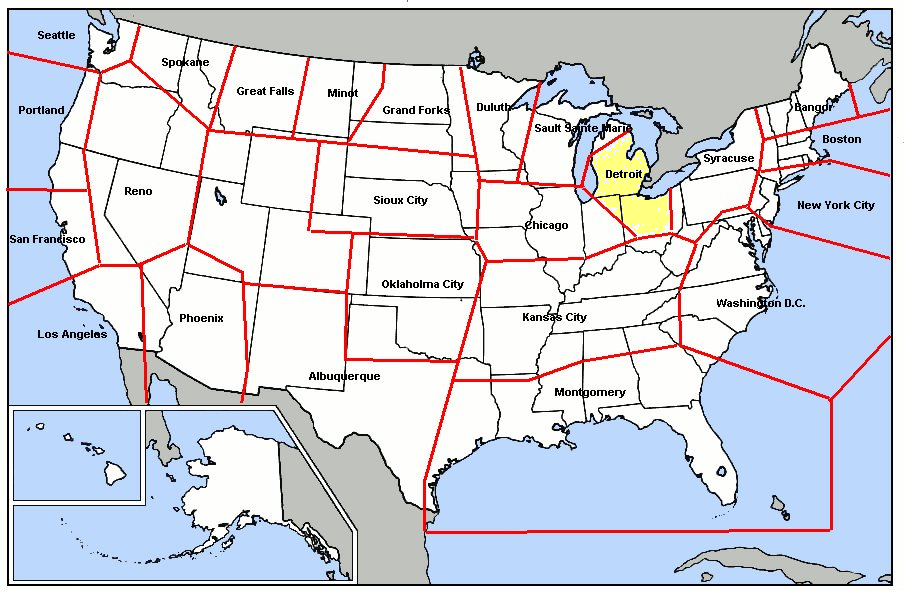
- 1958 Detroit Air Defense Sector Area of Responsibility
- Active: 1957–1966
- Country: United States
- Branch: United States Air Force
- Role: Air defense

Insignia
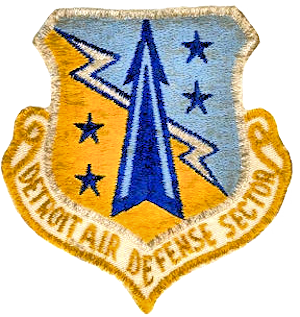
- Detroit Air Defense Sector emblem (Note: Approved 3 August 1960. Description: Per bend light blue and Or, between four mullets two in sinister chief and two in dexter base palewise Azure, a lightning flash bendwise Argent, outlined of the third [color mentioned], over all in pale throughout an aircraft-missile symbol of the last [color mentioned] highlighted of the first [color mentioned] and all within a diminished border of the fourth [color mentioned]. Significance: The emblem is symbolic of the sector and its mission. The field of light blue to represent the sky from which an aggressor would come, and golden yellow to represent the portion of the United States protected by this organization, is divided by a lightning bolt which is indicative of the speed with which the sector must react in case of attack. The aircraft-missile symbol is displayed in ready position to indicate the combat-ready status of the sector, and it is flanked by four stars, two on either side to indicate the four basic air defense functions [of] detection, identification, interception, and destruction. The emblem bears the Air Force colors, ultramarine blue and golden yellow.)

The Detroit Air Defense Sector (DEADS) is an inactive United States Air Force organization. Its last assignment was with the Air Defense Command (ADC) 26th Air Division at Custer Air Force Station (AFS), Michigan. It was inactivated on 1 April 1966.

== History ==
DEADS was originally designated as the 4627th Air Defense Wing but was redesignated before being organized in January 1957 at Custer AFS. It became operational in September 1958, and in 1959 it assumed control of former ADC Central Air Defense Force units with a mission to provide air defense of lower Michigan, northeast Indiana, and most of Ohio. The organization provided command and control over several aircraft, missile and radar squadrons.

On 1 September 1959 the Semi-Automatic Ground Environment (SAGE) Direction Center (DC-06) and Combat Center (CC-01) became operational. DC-06 was equipped with dual AN/FSQ-7 Computers. The day-to-day operations of the command were to train and maintain tactical units flying jet interceptor aircraft (F-86 Sabre, F-89 Scorpion, F-101 Voodoo, F-102 Delta Dagger, F-104 Starfighter, F-106 Delta Dart) and operating interceptor missiles (CIM-10 Bomarc) and radar squadrons in a state of readiness with training missions and series of exercises with Strategic Air Command and other units simulating interceptions of incoming enemy aircraft.

The sector was inactivated 1 April 1966 as part of ADC reorganization and consolidation and replaced at Custer AFS by the 34th Air Division. Most of its units were reassigned to 34th or the 29th Air Division.

=== Lineage ===
- Designated as 4627th Air Defense Wing, SAGE

Redesignated as Detroit Air Defense Sector on 8 January 1957 and organized
Discontinued and inactivated on 1 April 1966.

=== Assignments ===
- 30th Air Division, 8 January 1957
- 26th Air Division, 4 September 1963 – 1 April 1966

=== Stations ===
- Custer AFS, Michigan, 8 January 1957 – 1 April 1966

=== Components ===
==== Wing ====
- 1st Fighter Wing (Air Defense)

Selfridge AFB, Michigan, 1 April 1959 – 1 April 1966

==== Group ====
- 79th Fighter Group (Air Defense)

Youngstown Airport, Ohio, 1 April 1959 – 1 March 1960

==== Interceptor Squadrons ====
- 56th Fighter-Interceptor Squadron

Wright-Patterson AFB, Ohio, 1 April 1959 – 1 March 1960

- 87th Fighter-Interceptor Squadron

Lockbourne AFB, Ohio, 1 April 1959 – 1 April 1966

- 319th Fighter-Interceptor Squadron

Bunker Hill AFB, Indiana, 1 April 1959 – 1 March 1960

- 445th Fighter-Interceptor Squadron

Wurtsmith AFB, Michigan, 15 July 1963 – 1 April 1966

==== Missile Squadron ====
- 35th Air Defense Missile Squadron (BOMARC)

Niagara Falls Air Force Missile Site, New York, 4 September 1963 – 1 April 1966

==== Radar Squadrons ====
- 661st Aircraft Control & Warning Squadron (later 661st Radar Squadron (SAGE))

Selfridge AFB, Michigan, 1 April 1959 – 1 April 1966

- 662nd Aircraft Control & Warning Squadron (later 662d Radar Squadron (SAGE))

Oakdale Army Installation, Pennsylvania, 1 November 1959 – 15 June 1960; 4 September 1963 - 1 April 1966

- 664th Aircraft Control & Warning Squadron (later 664th Radar Squadron (SAGE))

Bellefontaine AFS, Ohio, 1 April 1959 – 1 April 1966

- 752d Radar Squadron (SAGE)

Empire AFS, Michigan, 15 July 1963 – 1 April 1966

- 754th Aircraft Control & Warning Squadron (later 754th Radar Squadron (SAGE))

Port Austin AFS, Michigan, 1 April 1959 – 1 April 1966

- 763d Radar Squadron (SAGE)

Lockport AFS, New York, 4 September 1963 – 1 April 1966

- 781st Aircraft Control & Warning Squadron (later 781st Radar Squadron (SAGE))

Custer AFS, Michigan, 1 April 1959 – 25 June 1965

- 783rd Aircraft Control & Warning Squadron (later 783d Radar Squadron (SAGE))

Guthrie AFS, West Virginia, 1 July 1961 – 1 April 1966

- 784th Aircraft Control & Warning Squadron (later 784th Radar Squadron (SAGE))

Snow Mountain AFS, Kentucky, 1 August 1961 – 25 May 1962

=== Weapons Systems ===
- F-86D, 1959-1960
- F-86L, 1959-1960
- F-89J, 1959-1960
- F-101B, 1960-1966
- F-102A, 1959-1960
- F-104A, 1959-1960
- F-106A, 1960-1966
- CIM-10 Bomarc, 1963-1966

== See also ==
- List of USAF Aerospace Defense Command General Surveillance Radar Stations
- Aerospace Defense Command Fighter Squadrons
- List of United States Air Force aircraft control and warning squadrons
