= 56th Training Squadron =

56th Training Squadron

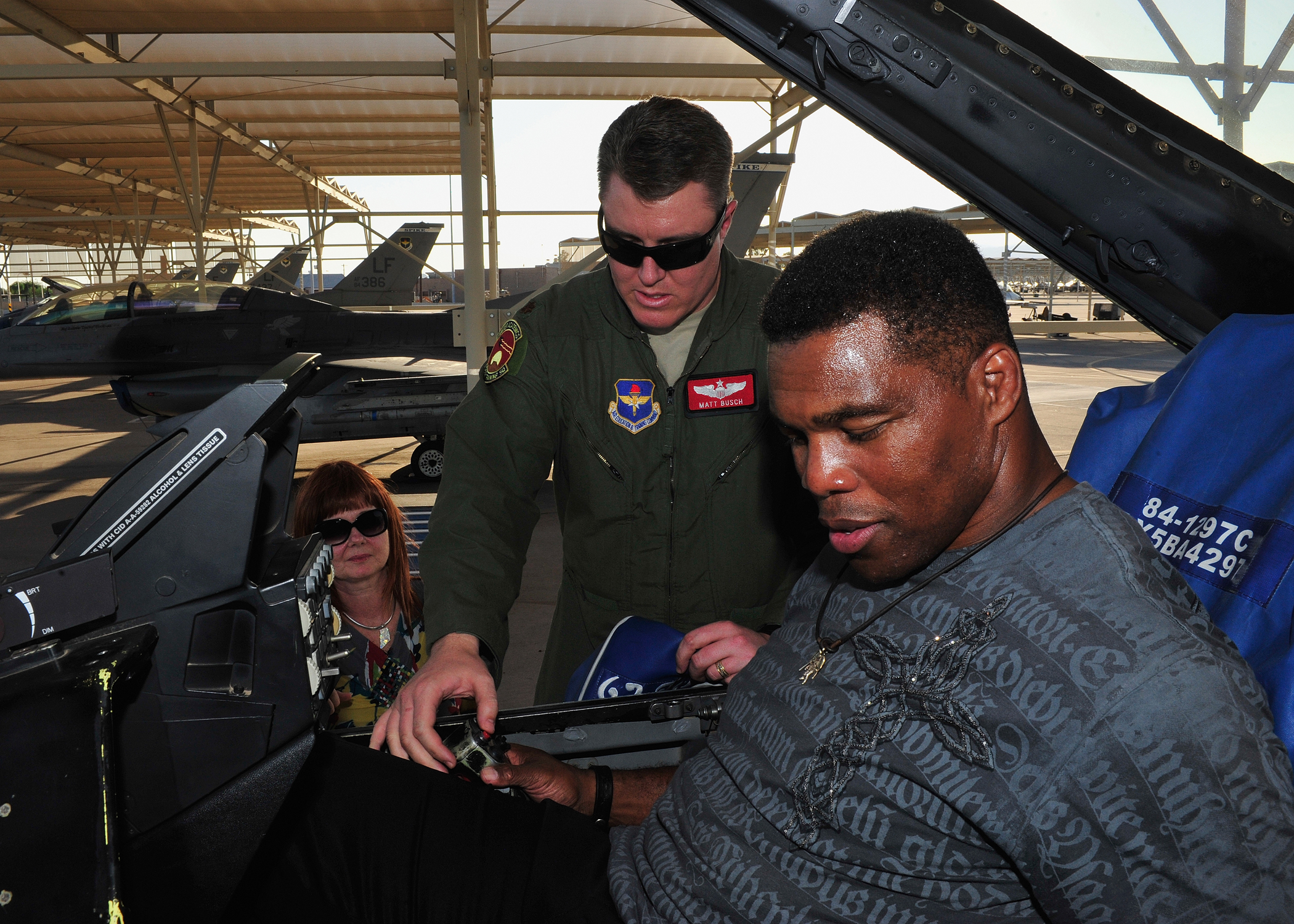
- Major Matt Busch of the 56th Training Squadron explains the controls of an F-16 Fighting Falcon to Herschel Walker at Luke AFB
- Active: 1941–1944; 1952–1960: 1979–1993; 1994–present
- Country: United States
- Branch: United States Air Force
- Role: Fighter Training
- Part of: Air Education and Training Command
- Engagements: Asiatic-Pacific Theater; American Theater of World War II
- Decorations: Distinguished Unit Citation; Air Force Outstanding Unit Award

Insignia
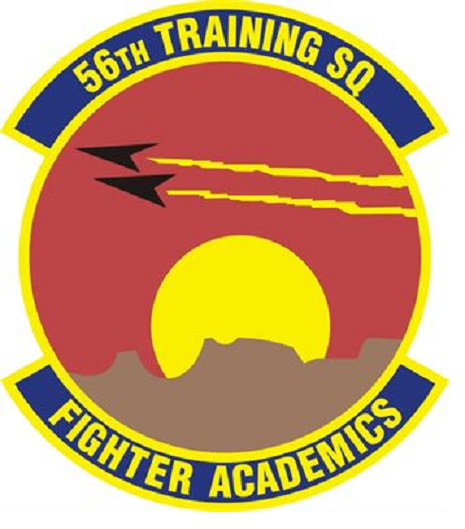
- 56th Training Squadron emblem (approved 20 July 1984)

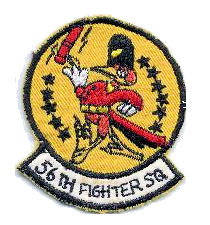
- Patch with the 56th Fighter Squadron emblem (approved 1 March 1944)

The 56th Training Squadron is an active United States Air Force unit. It is assigned to the 56th Operations Group at Luke Air Force Base, Arizona.

The squadron was first activated at Hamilton Field, California in 1941 as the 56th Pursuit Squadron. It deployed to Alaska where it earned a Distinguished Unit Citation in combat during the Aleutian Campaign. It returned to the United States, where it became a training unit and was disbanded in a general reorganization of the Army Air Forces in 1944.

The squadron was redesignated the 56th Fighter-Interceptor Squadron and activated late in 1952 as an air defense unit in the upper midwestern United States. It initially flew North American F-86 Sabres, but converted to the Lockheed F-104 Starfighter. It continued to fly the Starfighter until Air Defense Command began to phase them out of its inventory.

In 1979, the squadron was redesignated as the 56th Tactical Training Squadron. It dropped the "Tactical" from its designation in 1991. Since 1979, except for a brief break in 1993–1994, the squadron has conducted academic training for United States Air Force fighter pilots, earning six Air Force Outstanding Unit Awards along the way.

== Mission ==
The 56th Training Squadron trains almost half of the United States Air Force's new fighter pilots each year. It provides academic and ground training for pilots transitioning into the General Dynamics F-16 Fighting Falcon at Luke Air Force Base, and at the Papago Park military reservation in Phoenix, Arizona. Courses provided by the unit include initial instruction, transition courses, senior officer courses, Thunderbird/aggressor pilot instruction, forward air control, night systems and F-16 Block 50 specialized conversion courses. It also provides academic, simulator and live mission training for upgrading weapons directors. It establishes quality control of training materials and manages all international military student affairs and aircrew training devices for the 56th Fighter Wing.

== History ==
=== World War II ===
The squadron was activated at Hamilton Field, California as the 56th Pursuit Squadron on 15 January 1941, It trained with Curtiss P-36 Hawks and Curtiss P-40 Warhawks, then moved to Everett Army Air Field, where it served as a part of the air defense force for the northwest Pacific coast during the first few months of World War II. The squadron was redesignated as a fighter unit in May 1942.

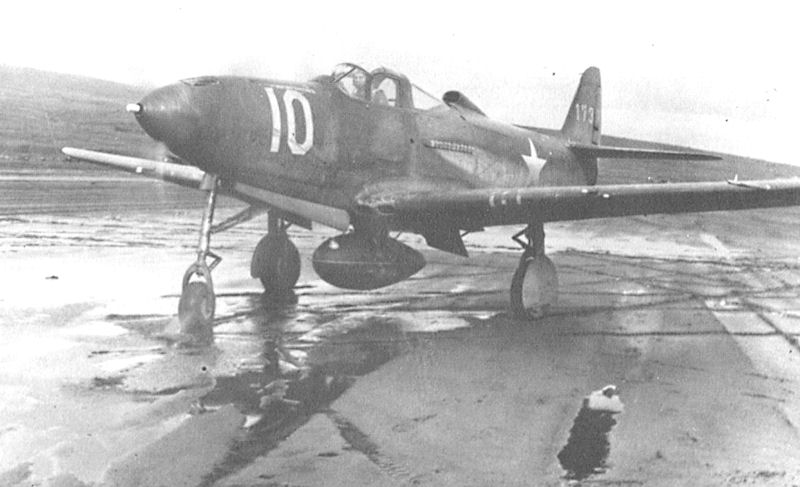
P-39 of the 54th Fighter Group in Alaska

On 20 June 1942, the air echelon of the 56th took its newly assigned Bell P-39 Airacobras to Nome, Alaska, where it served in combat against the Japanese forces that invaded the Aleutian Islands during the summer of 1942. For operations against the Japanese in November 1942 the squadron received a Distinguished Unit Citation.

The air echelon returned to the United States in December 1942 and rejoined the group, which had been assigned to Third Air Force in Louisiana, and became a replacement training unit (RTU) for North American P-51 Mustang pilots. RTUs were oversized units training individual pilots or aircrews. In early May 1943, the 54th Fighter Group began a split operation, with headquarters and the 56th and 57th Fighter Squadrons relocating to Bartow Army Air Field, Florida, while the group's other squadron was at Hillsborough Army Air Field. However, the Army Air Forces (AAF) was finding that standard military units, based on relatively inflexible tables of organization, were proving less well adapted to the training mission. Accordingly, a more functional system was adopted in which each base was organized into a separate numbered unit. As a result, in 1944 the squadron was disbanded as the AAF converted to the AAF Base Unit system. The units at Bartow were replaced by the 340th AAF Base Unit (Replacement Training Unit, Fighter),

=== Cold War ===
The squadron was reconstituted as the 56th Fighter-Interceptor Squadron, activated at Selfridge AFB, Michigan in November 1952, assigned to the 4708th Air Defense Wing, and equipped with North American F-86F Sabres. In February 1953 the 56th was assigned to the 575th Air Defense Group, and in July converted to radar equipped and Mighty Mouse rocket armed F-86Ds.

On 18 August 1955, as part of Air Defense Command's Project Arrow, which was designed to bring back on the active list the fighter units which had compiled memorable records in the two world wars., the 56th FIS moved on paper from Selfridge to Wright-Patterson AFB, Ohio, where it assumed the mission, personnel and aircraft of the 97th Fighter-Interceptor Squadron. At Wright-Patterson the squadron was assigned to the 4706th Air Defense Wing until the spring of 1956 when it transferred to the 58th Air Division. The squadron was the primary air defense unit for southwestern Ohio and the research facilities at Wright-Patterson.

In the Spring of 1957, the 56th FIS began re-equipping with the North American F-86L Sabre, an improved version of the F-86D which incorporated data link to communicate directly with Semi Automatic Ground Environment (SAGE) computers. The unit became proficient with both the F-86L and SAGE, and won an Air Defense Command "A" award for live rocket SURE-FIRE missions in the late summer of 1957.

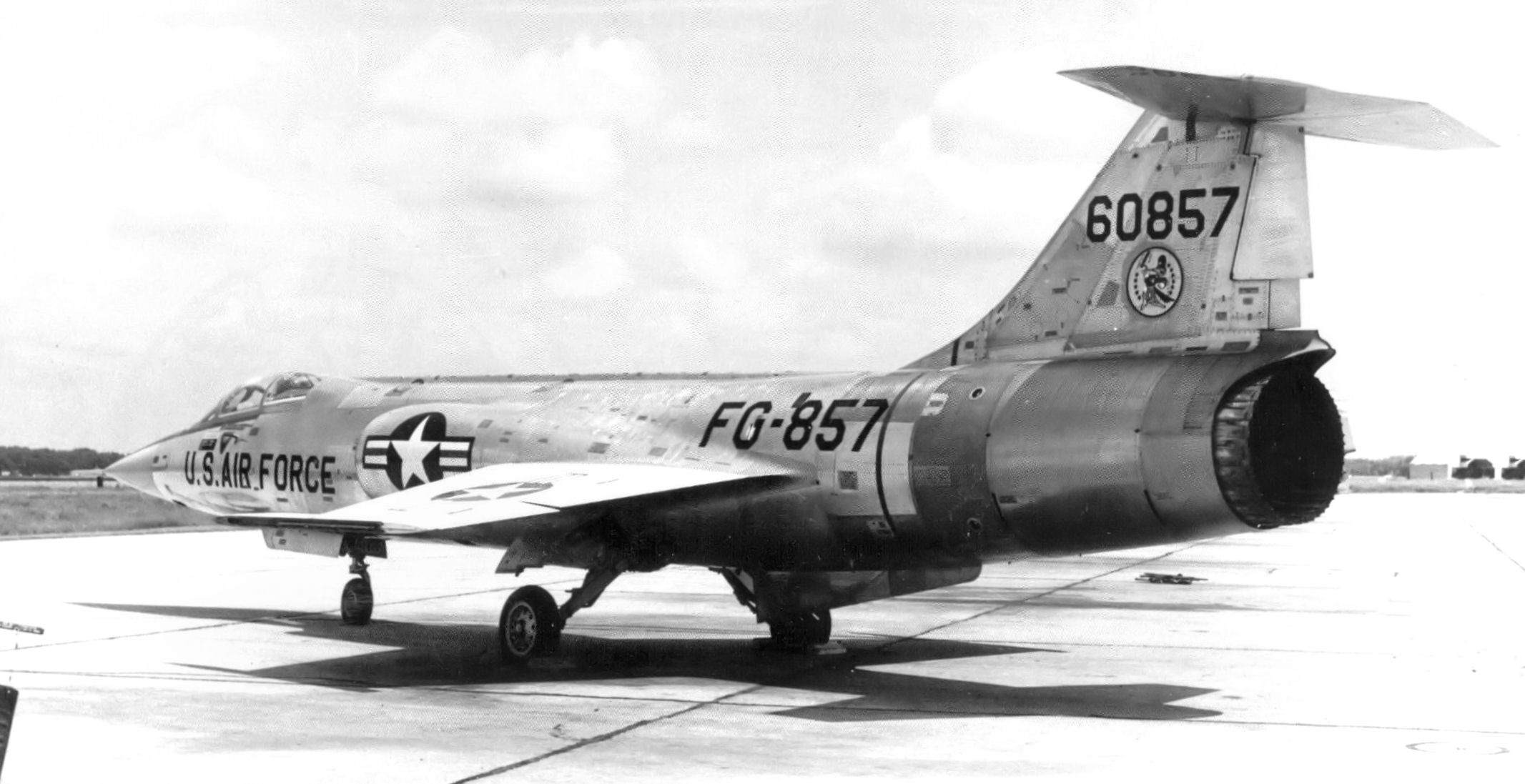
56th Fighter-Interceptor Squadron Lockheed F-104A Starfighter 56-857 at Wright-Patterson AFB

The transition into the F-86L was short-lived however, as the squadron began transition into the "missile-with-a-man-in-it", the Lockheed F-104 Starfighter in May 1958, becoming the second ADC squadron equipped with the Starfighter. The squadron received both single seat F-104As and the two-seat, dual-control, combat trainer F-104B. The performance of the F-104B was almost identical to that of the F-104A, but the lower internal fuel capacity reduced its effective range considerably. The 56th FIS was under operational control of 30th Air Division (Air Defense), before being transferred to the Detroit Air Defense Sector in April 1959.

It was found that the F-104A was not very well suited for service as an interceptor. Its short interception range was a problem for North American air defense, and its lack of all-weather capability made it incapable of operating in conjunction with the SAGE system. Its service with the ADC was consequently quite brief, and the F-104As of the 56th FIS were transferred to the Air National Guard.

With the transfer of the Starfighters, ADC shut down operations at Wright-Patterson and the 56th FIS was inactivated at Wright-Patterson on 1 March 1960.

=== Training ===
In 1979, the squadron became the 56th Tactical Training Squadron and was assigned to the 56th Tactical Fighter Wing at MacDill Air Force Base, Florida to conduct academic training for F-16 Fighting Falcon fighter pilots until 1993 when it was inactivated. From the spring of 1994, performed the same function at Luke Air Force Base, Arizona as well as for McDonnell Douglas F-15 Eagle pilots in 1994 and 1995. The squadron has earned six Air Force Outstanding Unit Awards for its performance of this mission.

== Lineage ==
- Constituted as the 56th Pursuit Squadron (Interceptor) on 20 November 1940

Activated on 15 January 1941
Redesignated 56th Fighter Squadron, Single Engine on 15 May 1942
Disbanded on 1 May 1944

- Reconstituted and redesignated 56th Fighter-Interceptor Squadron, on 14 November 1952

Activated on 27 November 1952
Discontinued on 1 March 1960

- Redesignated 56th Tactical Training Squadron on 25 September 1979

Activated on 1 October 1979
Redesignated 56th Training Squadron on 1 November 1991
Inactivated on 20 July 1993

- Activated on 1 April 1994

=== Assignments ===
- 54th Pursuit Group (later Fighter Group), 15 January 1941 – 1 May 1944
- 4708th Defense Wing, 27 November 1952
- 575th Air Defense Group, 16 February 1953
- 4706th Air Defense Wing, 18 August 1955
- 58th Air Division, 1 March 1956
- 30th Air Division, 1 September 1958
- Detroit Air Defense Sector, 1 April 1959 – 1 March 1960
- 56th Tactical Fighter Wing (later 56th Tactical Training Wing, 56th Fighter Wing), 1 October 1979
- 56th Operations Group, 1 November 1991 – 20 July 1993
- 56th Operations Group, 1 April 1994 – present

=== Stations ===
- Hamilton Field, [California, 15 January 1941
- Everett Army Air Field (later Paine Field), Washington, 26 June 1941
- Harding Field, Louisiana, 31 January 1942 (air echelon operated from Santa Ana Army Air Base, California, 28 May 1942 – 12 June 1942, Nome, Alaska, 20 June 1942 – 20 October 1942, and Elmendorf Field, Alaska Territory, 23 October 1942 – 21 December 1942)
- Bartow Army Air Field, Florida, May 1943-1 May 1944
- Selfridge Air Force Base, Michigan, 27 November 1952
- Wright-Patterson Air Force Base, Ohio, 18 August 1955 – 1 March 1960
- MacDill Air Force Base, Florida, 1 October 1979 – 20 July 1993
- Luke Air Force Base, Arizona, 1 April 1994 – present

=== Aircraft ===
- Curtiss P-40 Warhawk, 1941
- Bell P-39 Airacobra, 1941–1943
- North American P-51 (later F-51) Mustang, 1943–1944, 1952–1953
- F-86F Sabre, 1953
- F-86D Sabre, 1953–1957
- F-86L Sabre, 1957–1958
- Lockheed F-104A/B Starfighter, 1958–1960

=== Awards and campaigns ===
Award streamer	Award	Dates	Notes
	Distinguished Unit Citation	c. June 1942 – 4 November 1942	Alaska, 56th Fighter Squadron
	Air Force Outstanding Unit Award	1 July 1980 – 30 June 1982	56th Tactical Training Squadron
	Air Force Outstanding Unit Award	1 June 1984 – 31 May 1986	56th Tactical Training Squadron
	Air Force Outstanding Unit Award	1 May 1987 – 30 April 1989	56th Tactical Training Squadron
	Air Force Outstanding Unit Award	1 May 1989 – 30 April 1990	56th Tactical Training Squadron
	Air Force Outstanding Unit Award	1 May 1990 – 30 April 1991	56th Tactical Training Squadron
	Air Force Outstanding Unit Award	1 July 1994 – 30 June 1996	56th Training Squadron

Campaign Streamer	Campaign	Dates	Notes
	Air Combat Asiatic-Pacific	20 June 1942 – 21 December 1943	56th Fighter Squadron
	American Theater	7 December 1941 – 1 May 1944	56th Fighter Squadron
