= Mount Baldhead =

Mountain in Michigan, United States

Coordinates: 42°39′41″N 086°12′33″W

- Dune
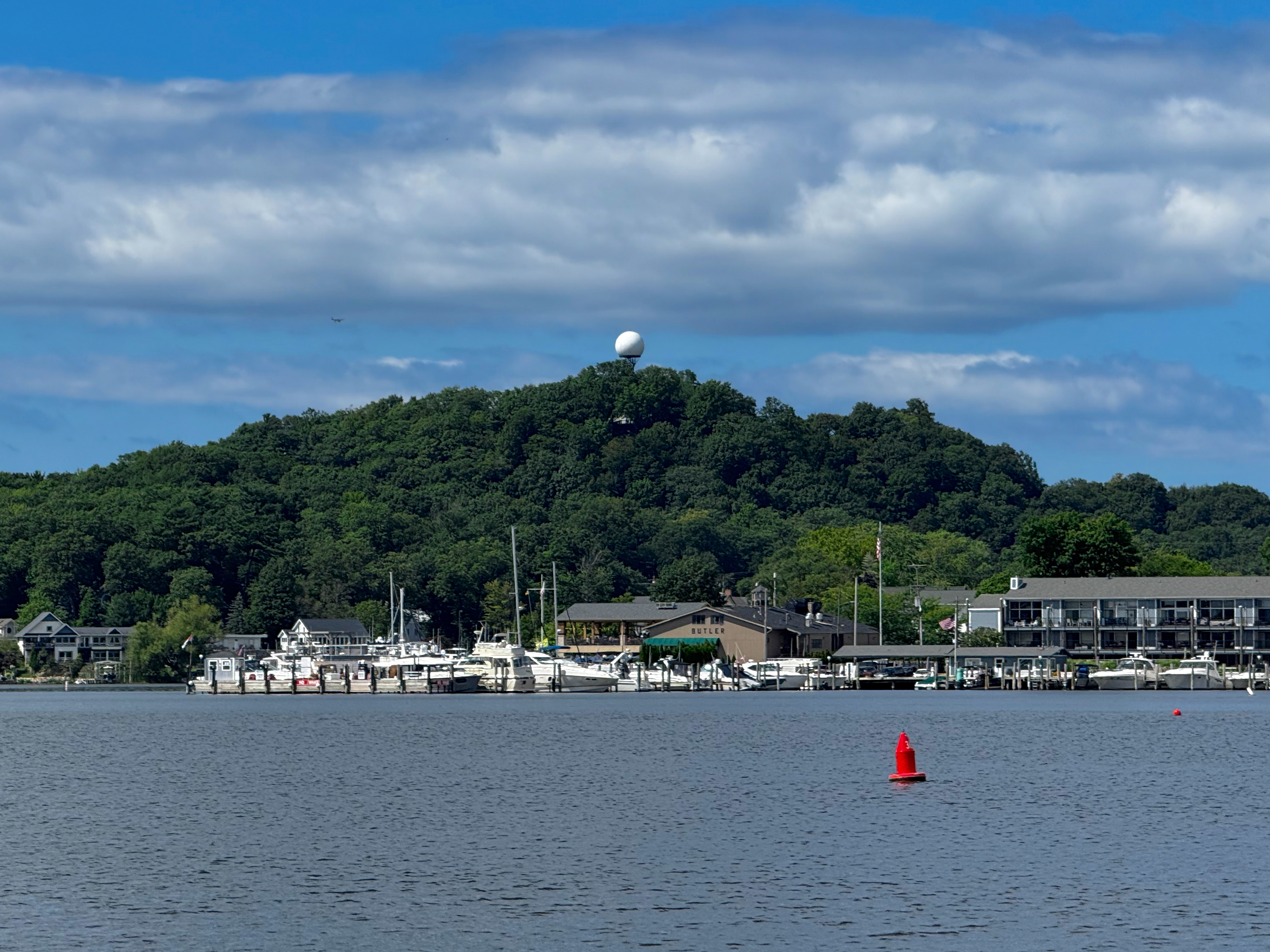
- Mount Baldhead viewed across the Kalamazoo Lake
- Interactive map of Mount Baldhead
- Location: Saugatuck, Michigan

Dimensions
  - Height: 250 feet (76 m)
- Elevation: 807 feet (246 m)

Mount Baldhead, also known as Mt. Baldy and Radar Hill, is a 250-foot (76-meter) sand dune located on a narrow strip of land between Lake Michigan and Kalamazoo River, directly across the river from downtown Saugatuck. It has an elevation of 807 feet (246 meters) and is about 70 miles (110 kilometers) north of the Indiana border on the west shore of Michigan in Allegan County.

== History ==
=== Early history ===
Oral traditions said that the indigenous Potawatomi had annual gatherings on Mount Baldhead, where rituals were performed. When European settlers arrived, the dune began to be used as a lookout point. By 1850, Mount Baldhead was recognized as a local landmark for tourists and in the following decades, the Fat Men’s Association of Allegan would climb the hill for their exercise routine. In 1887, a set of stairs up the dune and a watch tower were constructed. Tourists in the 19th century camped at the base of Mount Baldhead, renting tents, rugs and chairs for $1 per month.

=== 20th century ===
The top of Mount Baldhead was absent of trees until the 1930s when vegetation was planted to prevent the dune's erosion. In 1936, the city of Saugatuck opened Oval Beach to the west of Mount Baldhead.

During the Cold War, the Saugatuck Gap Filler Annex, was placed on top of the dune. Appearing similar to its original construction, the Saugatuck gap-filler is believed to be the last of the hundreds of SAGE system radars in public hands, with nearly all of its Cold War era equipment still in place.

=== Recent history ===
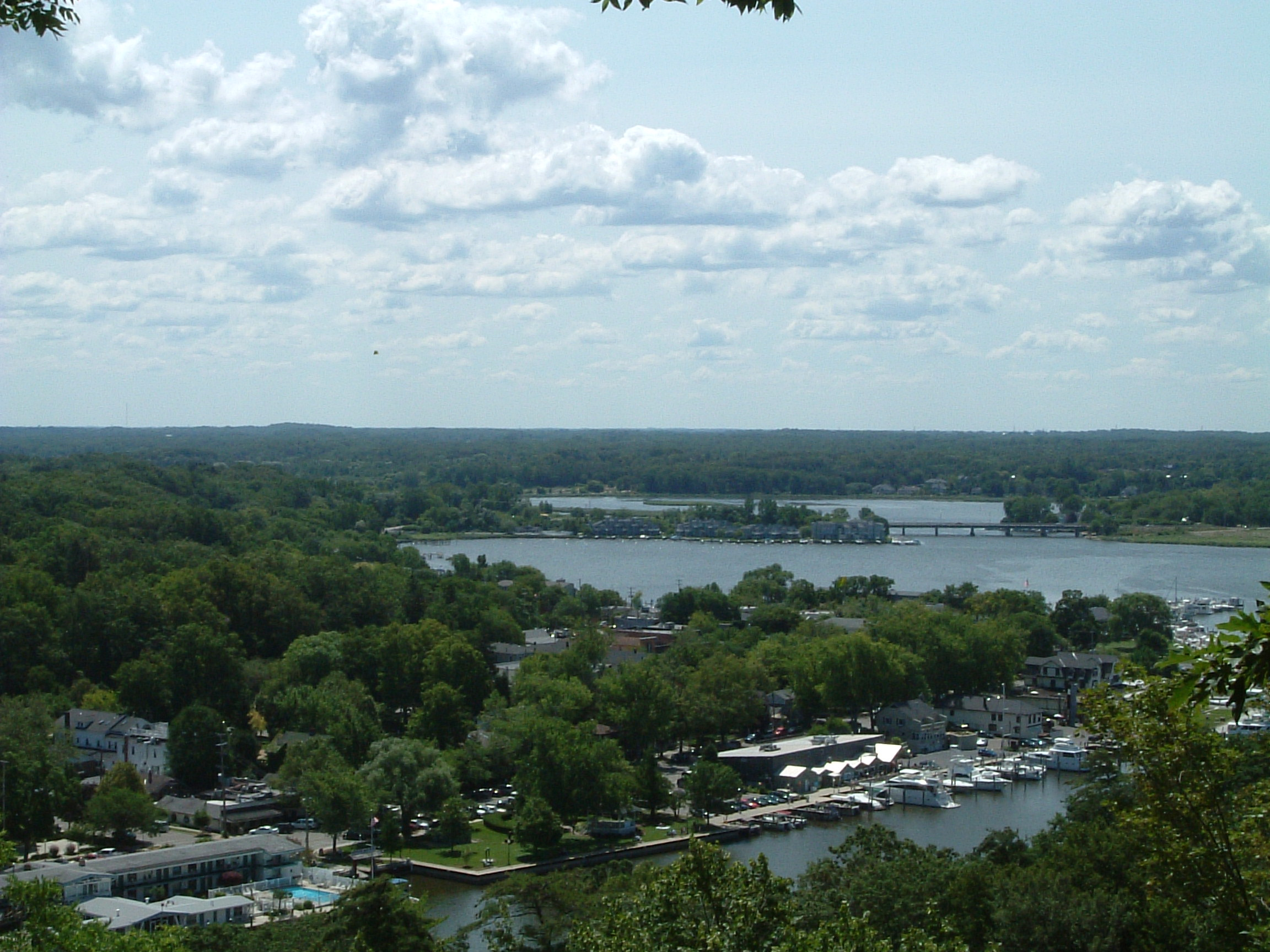
Saugatuck MI from Mount Baldhead

A set of stairs comprising 303 steps leads up the east side of the dune from a parking lot adjacent to Kalamazoo River to the Mount Baldhead Park at the top of the dune. A deck at the top of the stairs commands a view miles inland, with downtown Saugatuck below, immediately across the river, and Douglas just to the south. A number of trails lead down the wooded west side of the dune to Oval Park and the lake shore. Dogs are no longer allowed on the steps.

The dune is also host to the very popular annual Mount Baldhead Challenge multi-terrain foot race which, of course, includes a jaunt up the stairs and contributes all proceeds to the Boys & Girls Club of Saugatuck/Douglas.
