= 575th Air Defense Group =

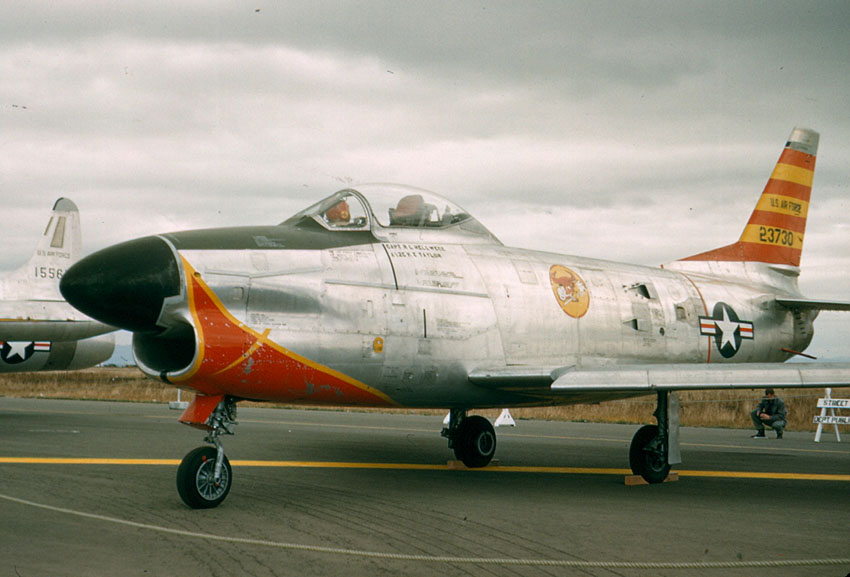
- F-86D Sabre of the group's 13th Fighter-Interceptor Squadron (Note: Aircraft is North American F-86D-40-NA Sabre, serial 52-3730. This plane was assigned to the Colorado Air National Guard in 1960, then savaged at the Military Aircraft Storage and Disposal Center. Baugher, Joe (7 April 2023). "1952 USAF Serial Numbers". Joe Baugher.)
- Active: 1946–1947; 1953–1955
- Country: United States
- Branch: United States Air Force
- Type: Fighter interceptor
- Role: Air defense

The 575th Air Defense Group is a disbanded United States Air Force organization. Its last assignment was with the 4708th Air Defense Wing at Selfridge Air Force Base, Michigan, where it was inactivated in August 1955. The group was originally activated as the 575th Air Service Group, a support unit for the 4th Fighter Group after the 4th returned to the United States at the end of World War II and performed that mission until it was inactivated in 1947.

The group was activated once again in 1952 as the 575th Air Base Group to replace the support elements of the inactivating 56th Fighter-Interceptor Wing. A year later Air Defense Command established it as an operational headquarters for fighter-interceptor squadrons as well. It was replaced in 1955 when ADC transferred its mission, equipment, and personnel to the 1st Fighter Group in a project that replaced air defense groups commanding fighter squadrons with fighter groups with distinguished records during World War II.

== History ==
=== Strategic Air Command ===
The group was activated in 1946 as the 575th Air Service Group to support the 4th Fighter Group at Selfridge Field, Michigan. Its 1044th Air Engineering Squadron provided maintenance that was beyond the capability of the fighter group, its 1054th Air Materiel Squadron handled all supply matters, and its Headquarters & Base Services Squadron provided other support. The group moved to Andrews Field, Maryland, where it was inactivated in August 1947 and its personnel and equipment were transferred to the 4th Airdrome Group, which assumed its mission under the experimental Wing/Base reorganization. It was disbanded in October 1948.

=== Air Defense Command ===
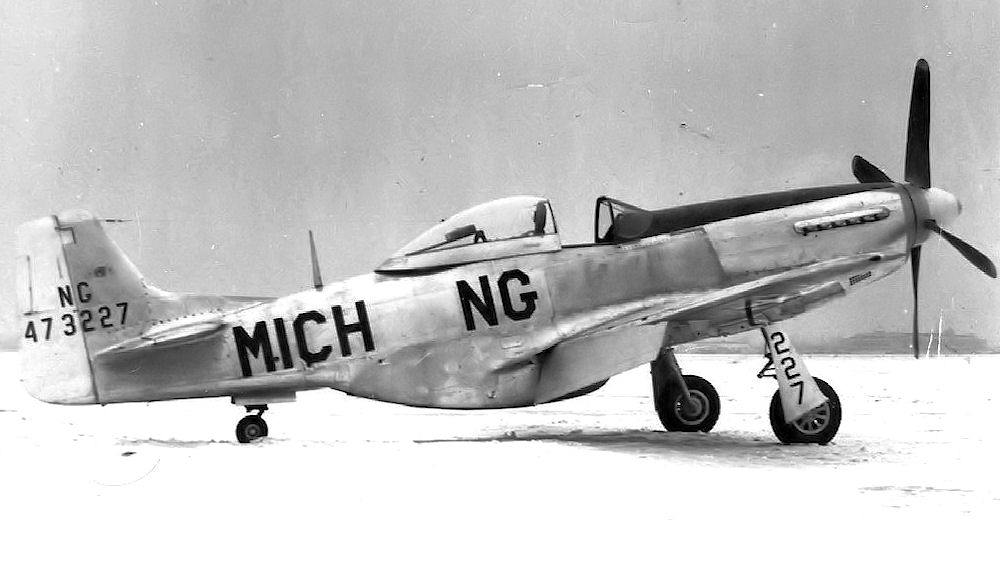
F-51D of the 172d FIS (Note: On 1 November 1952 the 172d Fighter-Interceptor Squadron was returned to the control of the Michigan Air National Guard. Its F-51s were transferred to the newly-activated 431st Fighter-Interceptor Squadron, which continued to fly them until converting to Sabres in May 1953)

The group was reconstituted, redesignated as the 575th Air Base Group, and activated at Selfridge in 1952 in a major reorganization of Air Defense Command (ADC) responding to ADC's difficulty under the existing wing base organizational structure in deploying fighter squadrons to best advantage. It replaced the 56th Air Base Group as the USAF host unit for Selfridge. The group was assigned seven squadrons to perform its support responsibilities. It also maintained aircraft stationed at Selfridge.

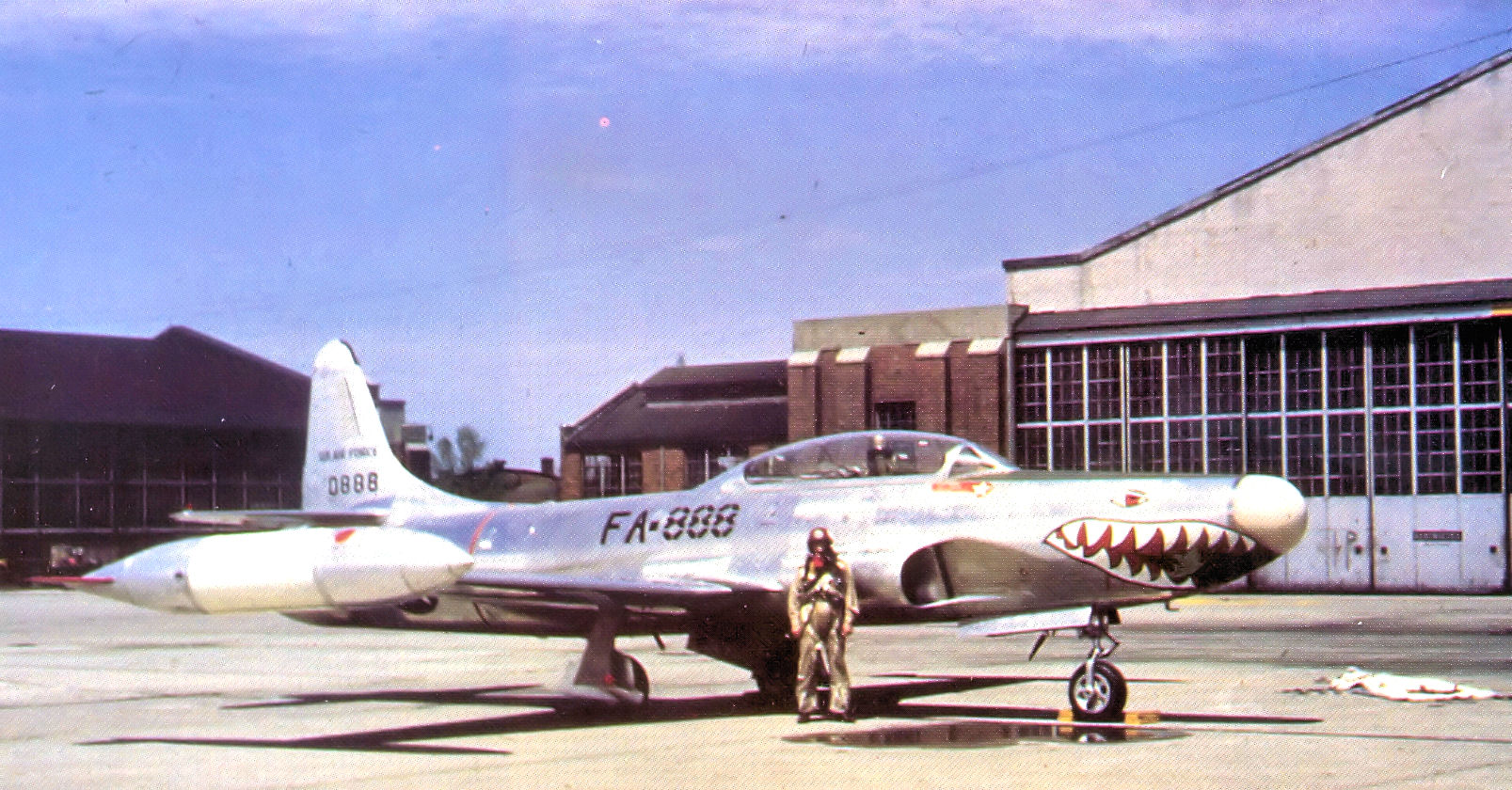
F-94B of the 61st FIS (Note: Aircraft is Lockheed F-94B-1-LO Starfire, serial 50-0888. Later assigned to the New York Air National Guard. Transferred to the Military Aircraft Storage and Disposal Center on 20 March 1958, salvaged on 26 March 1958. Baugher, Joe (7 April 2023). "1950 USAF Serial Numbers". Joe Baugher.)

The group was redesignated as the 575th Air Defense Group in 1953 and assumed responsibility for air defense of the upper Great Lakes area. It was assigned the 56th Fighter-Interceptor Squadron (FIS), flying single seat North American F-86 Sabre aircraft, the 61st FIS, flying two-seat Lockheed F-94 Starfire aircraft, armed with 20mm cannon, and the 431st FIS, flying World War II era North American F-51 Mustang aircraft from the 4708th Defense Wing as its operational elements. The three squadrons were already stationed at Selfridge. In May 1953, the 431st FIS converted to Sabres and the following month moved to Libya and was assigned away from the group. Meanwhile, in April 1953, the 13th Fighter-Interceptor Squadron, flying a newer radar equipped and Mighty Mouse rocket armed model of the F-86 aircraft was activated as a fourth operational squadron. In July the 56th FIS upgraded to newer radar equipped "Sabres," so that when the 61st FIS moved to Newfoundland and was transferred out of the group in August, all squadrons of the 575th were flying the same aircraft, the F-86D, for the first time. In September, the group's medical squadron responsibility expanded when the nearby Percy Jones Army Hospital closed.

The group was inactivated and replaced by 1st Fighter Group (Air Defense) in 1955 as part of Air Defense Command's Project Arrow, which was designed to bring back on the active list the fighter units which had compiled memorable records in the two world wars. It was disbanded again in 1984.

== Lineage ==
- Constituted as the 575th Air Service Group

Activated c. 5 September 1946
Inactivated on 15 August 1947
Disbanded on 8 October 1948

- Reconstituted and redesignated 575th Air Base Group on 1 January 1952

Activated on 1 February 1952

- Redesignated as 575th Air Defense Group on 16 February 1953

Inactivated on 18 August 1955
Disbanded on 27 September 1984

=== Assignments ===
- Fifteenth Air Force, c. 5 September 1946
- Strategic Air Command, 26 March 1947 – 15 August 1947
- 4708th Defense Wing (later 4708th Air Defense Wing), 7 February 1952 – 18 August 1955

=== Stations ===
- Selfridge Field, Michigan, 5 September 1946
- Andrews Field, Maryland, 26 March 1947 – 15 August 1947
- Selfridge AFB, Michigan, 7 February 1952 – 18 August 1955

=== Components ===
Operational Squadrons

- 13th Fighter-Interceptor Squadron, 27 April 1953 – 18 August 1955
- 56th Fighter-Interceptor Squadron, 16 February 1953 – 18 August 1955
- 61st Fighter-Interceptor Squadron, 16 February 1953 – 6 August 1953
- 431st Fighter-Interceptor Squadron, 16 February 1953 – 23 June 1953

Support Squadrons

- 575th Air Police Squadron, 1 February 1952 – 18 August 1955
- 575th Food Service Squadron, 1 February 1952 – 18 August 1955
- 575th Field Maintenance Squadron, 1 February 1952 – 18 August 1955
- 575th Installations Squadron, 1 February 1952 – 18 August 1955
- 575th Medical Squadron (later 575th USAF Hospital), 1 February 1952 – 18 August 1955
- 575th Motor Vehicle Squadron, 1 February 1952 – 18 August 1955
- 575th Operations Squadron, 1 February 1952 – 18 August 1955
- 575th Supply Squadron, 1 February 1952 – 18 August 1955
- 1044th Air Engineering Squadron, ca. 5 September 1946 – 15 August 1947
- 1054th Air Materiel Squadron, ca. 5 September 1946 – 15 August 1947

=== Aircraft ===
- North American F-51D Mustang, 1953
- North American F-86D Sabre, 1953–55
- North American F-86F Sabre, 1953
- Lockheed F-94B Starfighter, 1953

== See also ==
- Aerospace Defense Command Fighter Squadrons
- List of F-86 Sabre units
- F-94 Starfire units of the United States Air Force
