= Custer Air Force Station =

Radar station in Michigan, US 1952–1965

Custer Air Force Station
- Part of Air Defense Command (ADC)

Site information
- Type: Air Force Station
- Controlled by: United States Air Force

Location
- Location of Custer AFS, Michigan
- Coordinates: 42°20′32″N 085°16′49″W

Site history
- Built: 1952
- In use: 1952–1965

Garrison information
- Garrison: 781st Aircraft Control and Warning (later Radar) Squadron

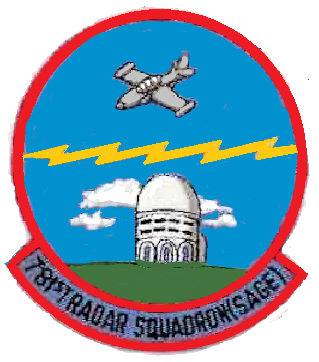
Emblem of the 781st Radar Squadron

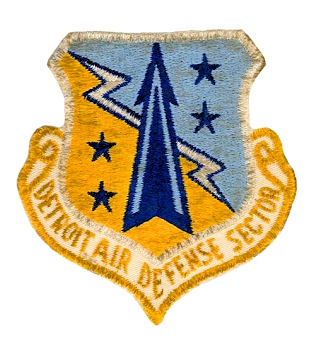
Emblem of the Detroit Air Defense Sector

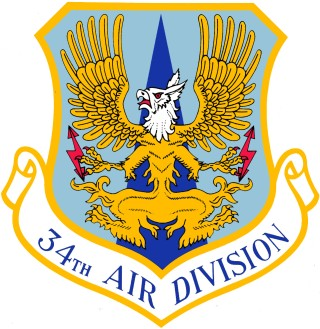
Emblem of the 34th Air Division

Custer Air Force Station (ADC ID: P-67 DC-6, NORAD ID: Z-67, DC-6) is a closed United States Air Force General Surveillance Radar and Direction Center station. It is located 5.3 miles (8.5 km) west-northwest of Battle Creek, Michigan. It was closed in 1969.

== History ==
=== Cold War era ===
Prompted by the start of the Korean War, on 11 July 1950, the Secretary of the Air Force asked the Secretary of Defense for approval to expedite construction of the second segment Air Defense Commands permanent radar network. Receiving the Defense Secretary's approval on 21 July, the Air Force directed the Corps of Engineers to proceed with construction of what became the network of Semi Automatic Ground Environment (SAGE) sites. The SAGE system was a network linking Air Force (and later FAA) General Surveillance Radar stations into a centralized center for Air Defense, intended to provide early warning and response for a Soviet nuclear attack.

The SAGE site that would become Custer Air Force Station was carved out of the eastern side of the Army's Fort Custer Training Center near Battle Creek, Michigan. The site was officially established on 18 April 1953. However, the 781st Aircraft Control and Warning Squadron (AC&W Sq) began operations with AN/FPS-3 and AN/CPS-4 radars at the site in April 1952. Initially the station functioned as a Ground-Control Intercept (GCI) and warning station. As a GCI station, the squadron's role was to guide interceptor aircraft toward unidentified intruders picked up on the unit's radar scopes.

The site was renamed Custer Air Force Station on 1 July 1956. An AN/FPS-4 replaced the AN/CPS-4 in 1956 and an AN/FPS-6 superseded this unit two years later. Also in 1958 an AN/FPS-20 replaced the AN/FPS-3 search radar. This radar was upgraded to an AN/FPS-66 in 1961. A second height-finder radar was installed in 1959. On 31 July 1963, the site was redesignated as NORAD ID Z-67.

In 1958, the SAGE Data Center (DC-06) was established at Custer AFS (Fort Custer). DC-06 was co-located on the Cantonment area of the 781st AC&W Sq. During September, 1959, the 781st AC&W Sq joined the SAGE system, feeding data to DC-06. After joining, the squadron was re-designated as the 781st Radar Squadron (SAGE) (Radar Sq) on 1 September 1959. The squadron provided information 24/7 the SAGE Direction Center where it was analyzed to determine range, direction altitude speed and whether or not aircraft were friendly or hostile.

In addition to the main facility, Custer AFS operated the following AN/FPS-18 gap-filler sites:

- Midland, MI (P-67A/P-20G) 43°38′03″N 084°25′42″W
- Richland Center, IN (P-67B/P-73J) 41°07′05″N 086°14′28″W
- Saugatuck, MI (P-67C/Z-34G) 42°39′44″N 086°12′33″W
- Shelby, MI (P-67D/Z-34H) 43°36′00″N 086°20′25″W

Of all of the gap-filler radars once under the control of Custer AFS, only the Saugatuck annex still stands basically as it did while in operation. In fact, of all of the radars in the SAGE system, gap-filler or long-range, the Saugatuck annex appears to be the last site in public hands that is nearly completely intact with all of the electronic equipment still in place in both the building and tower.

The 781st Radar Sq was inactivated on 25 June 1965 and the sector was discontinued on 1 April 1966. The gap-filler radars at Saugatuck and Shelby, MI were transferred to the 752nd Radar Squadron, Empire, MI on 27 January 1965, at which time they acquired ID's Z-34G and Z-34H, respectively. Midland, MI was transferred to the 661st Radar Squadron, Selfridge AFB, near Mount Clemens, MI on 4 February 1965, and Richland Center, IN was transferred to the 664th Radar Squadron, Bellefontaine AFA, OH on 15 February 1965.

DC-06 was initially under the Detroit Air Defense Sector (DeADS), originally established as the 4627th Air Defense Wing on 8 January 1957. The DeADS was replaced by the 34th Air Division (AD). DC-06 with its AN/FSQ-7 computer remained under the 34th AD until it was inactivated on 30 September 1969 when technology advances allowed the Air Force to shut down many SAGE Data Centers. With the inactivation of the Air Division, Custer AFS was closed effective 31 Dec 1969.

=== Current status ===
Today the site is a business & industrial park. The large SAGE DC-06 blockhouse remains, now being a secure storage facility operated by Iron Mountain Storage. The blockhouse stores paper archives, but still retains the original elevator and large map display with rolling ladder on a secret floor. The buildings in the immediate area of the SAGE blockhouse are in generally good repair, with some still in use. The Battle Creek regional chapters of the Air Force Sergeant's Association and Air Force Enlisted Association use the old Open Mess building.

== Air Force units and assignments ==
=== Units ===
- 34th Air Division (Defense) redesignated 34th Air Division and activated on 20 January 1966

Organized on 1 April 1966
Inactivated on 31 December 1969

- 4627th Air Defense Wing designated December 1956

Redesignated as Detroit Air Defense Sector and organized on 8 January 1957
Discontinued on 1 April 1966

- Constituted as the 781st Aircraft Control and Warning Squadron

Activated on 16 April 1951
Redesignated as 781st Radar Squadron (SAGE) on 1 September 1959
Discontinued and inactivated on 25 June 1965

- Organized as the 4627th Air Base Squadron c.. 8 January 1957

Discontinued c.. 15 July 1959

- Organized as the 4627th Support Squadron (SAGE) on 15 July 1959

Discontinued c.. 31 December 1969

- Constituted as the 644th USAF Dispensary

Activated c.. 8 January 1957
Discontinued and inactivated c.. 30 June 1964

=== Assignments ===
- 34th Air Division

First Air Force 1 April 1966 – 31 December 1969

- 4627th Air Defense Wing (later Detroit Air Defense Sector)

30th Air Division, 8 January 1957
26th Air Division. 4 September 1963 – 1 April 1966

- 781st Aircraft Control and Warning Squadron (later 781st Radar Squadron)
- 541st Aircraft Control and Warning Group, 16 April 1951
- 30th Air Division, 6 February 1952
- 4706th Defense Wing, 16 February 1953
- 4708th Defense Wing (later 4708th Air Defense Wing), 1 November 1953
- 30th Air Division, 8 July 1956
- Detroit Air Defense Sector, 1 April 1959 – 25 June 1965
- 4627th Air Base Squadron

Detroit Air Defense Sector c.. 8 January 1957 – c.. 15 July 1959

- 4627th Support Squadron

Detroit Air Defense Sector 15 July 1959
30th Air Division 1 Apr 1966 – c.. 31 December 1969

- 644th USAF Dispensary

Detroit Air Defense Sector c.. 8 January 1957 – c.. 30 June 1964

== See also ==
- List of United States Air Force aircraft control and warning squadrons
- United States general surveillance radar stations
