= 13th Fighter-Interceptor Squadron =

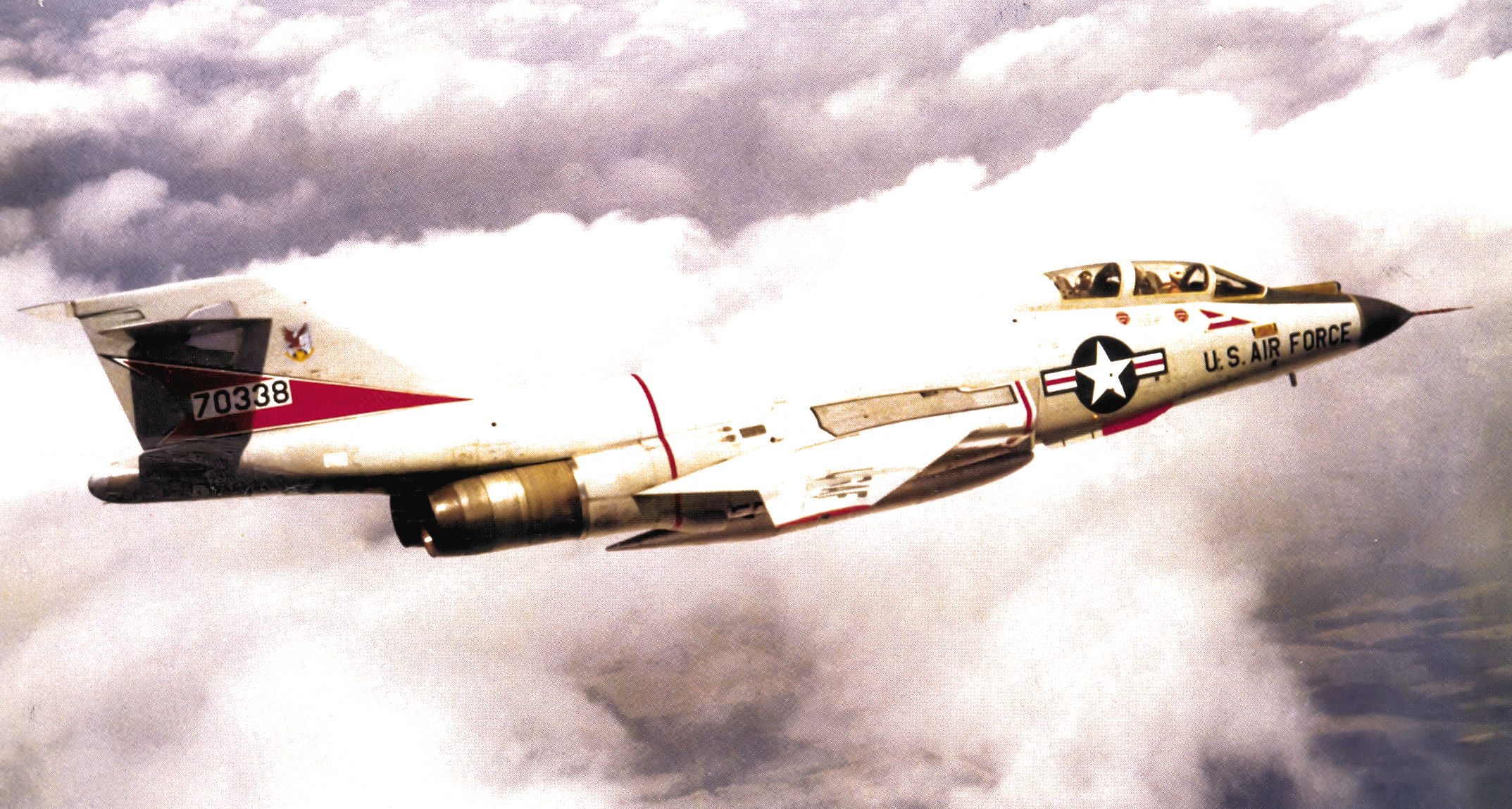
- 13th Fighter-Interceptor Squadron McDonnell F-101B Voodoo 57-0338 at Glasgow AFB in 1962
- Active: 1940-1944; 1953–1968
- Country: United States
- Branch: United States Air Force
- Role: Fighter-interceptor

Insignia
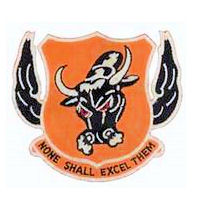
- Emblem of the 13th Fighter-Interceptor Squadron (approved 24 April 1956)

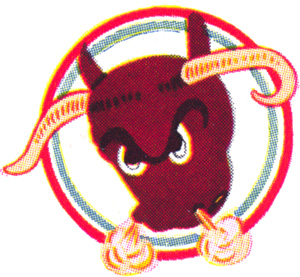
- 13th Fighter Squadron emblem (World War II)

The 13th Fighter-Interceptor Squadron is an inactive United States Air Force unit. Its last assignment was with the Minot Air Defense Sector, stationed at Glasgow Air Force Base, Montana where it was inactivated on 30 June 1968.

The squadron was first activated in January 1941 as the 13th Pursuit Squadron As the 13th Fighter Squadron it participated in the air defense of the Panama Canal from 1941 until 1943 when it returned to the United States and became a training unit until it was disbanded in 1944.

== History ==
=== World War II ===
It was activated in early 1941 as the 13th Pursuit Squadron (Interceptor) and assigned to the Southeast Air District. It was equipped with a series of pursuit aircraft with a mission of air defense of Florida. After the Pearl Harbor Attack, the squadron was one of several hastily deployed to the Panama Canal Zone for the defense of the canal with the United States entry into World War II.

It was deployed on 2 January 1942 and stationed at Howard Field operating Bell P-39D Airacobras. By 16 February, the squadron had 12 P-39Ds (of which nine were airworthy) and not fewer than 26 pilots, but of these, only four had more than 12 months experience. Official records of its relatively brief tour in Panama are apparently all but nonexistent, although it is known that the unit was redesignated as the 13th Fighter Squadron on 15 May 1942 in keeping with the USAAF scheme at the time.

Following the perceived end of the emergency need for the unit, it returned to the United States in early 1943 where it became a Republic P-47 Thunderbolt, later North American P-51 Mustang replacement training unit for III Fighter Command. It was disbanded on 1 May 1944 as part of a reorganization of training units.

=== Air Defense Command ===
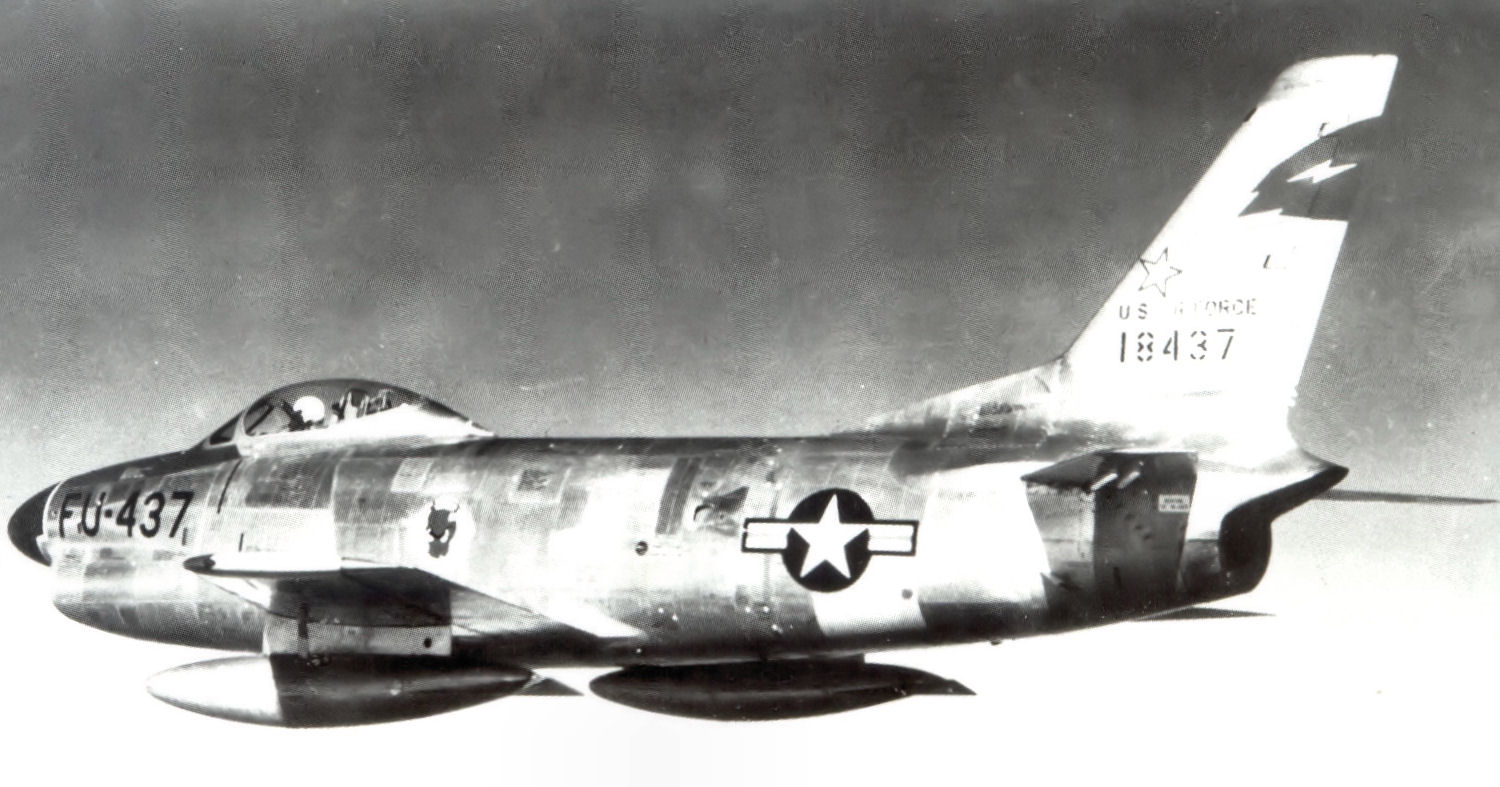
North American F-86D Sabre 51-8437 at Selfridge AFB in December 1953

It was reactivated in 1953 as part of Air Defense Command as an air defense squadron, equipped with North American F-86D Sabres and assigned to Selfridge Air Force Base, Michigan with a mission for the air defense of Detroit and Great Lakes region. It was moved to Sioux City, Iowa in 1955 for air defense of the Great Plains, and in 1957 began re-equipping with the North American F-86L Sabre, an improved version of the F-86D which incorporated the Semi Automatic Ground Environment, or SAGE computer-controlled direction system for intercepts. The service of the F-86L destined to be quite brief, since by the time the last F-86L conversion was delivered, the type was already being phased out in favor of supersonic interceptors.

The squadron was reassigned to Glasgow AFB, Montana in July 1959, upgraded to the new McDonnell F-101B Voodoo. Assigned alongside the F-101B interceptor was the F-101F operational and conversion trainer. The two-seat trainer version was equipped with dual controls, but carried the same armament as the F-101B and were fully combat-capable interceptors. On 22 October 1962, before President John F. Kennedy told Americans that missiles were in place in Cuba, the squadron dispersed one third of its force, equipped with nuclear tipped missiles to Billings Logan Field at the start of the Cuban Missile Crisis. These planes returned to Glasgow after the crisis.

It was inactivated in June 1968 as part of the drawdown of ADC interceptor bases, and the aircraft were passed along to the Air National Guard.

== Lineage ==
- Constituted as the 13th Pursuit Squadron (Interceptor) on 20 November 1940

Activated on 15 January 1941
Redesignated 13th Fighter Squadron (Single Engine) on 15 May 1942
Disbanded on 1 May 1944

- Reconstituted, and redesignated 13th Fighter-Interceptor Squadron on 11 February 1953

Activated on 27 April 1953
Inactivated on 30 June 1968

=== Assignments ===
- 53d Pursuit Group (later Fighter Group), 15 January 1941 – 1 May 1944
- 575th Air Defense Group, 27 April 1953
- 53d Fighter Group, 18 August 1955
- 476th Fighter Group, 1 July 1957
- 29th Air Division, 1 April 1960
- Great Falls Air Defense Sector, 1 January 1961 – 30 June 1968

=== Stations ===
- MacDill Field, Florida, 15 January 1941
- Dale Mabry Field, Florida, 8 May – 18 December 1941
- Howard Field, Panama Canal Zone, 2 January — 10 November 1942
- Dale Mabry Field, Florida, 26 November 1942
- Drew Field, Florida, 6 January 1943
- Page Field, Florida, 6 February 1943
- Venice Army Air Field, Florida, 1 June 1943 – 1 May 1944
- Selfridge Air Force Base, Michigan, 27 April 1953 – 18 August 1955
- Sioux City Municipal Airport, Iowa, 18 August 1955
- Glasgow Air Force Base, Montana, 2 July 1959 – 30 June 1968

=== Aircraft ===
- Seversky P-35, 1941
- Curtiss P-40 Warhawk, 1941
- Bell P-39 Airacobra, 1941–1943
- North American P-51 Mustang, 1943
- Republic P-47 Thunderbolt, 1943–1944
- North American F-86D Sabre Interceptor, 1953–1957
- North American F-86L Sabre Interceptor, 1957-1959
- McDonnell F-101B Voodoo, 1959–1968
