= Saugatuck Gap Filler Radar Annex =

Last Cold War radar installation

Saugatuck Gap Filler Annex
- Part of Air Defense Command (ADC)
- Saugatuck Gap Filler Radar Annex
- U.S. National Register of Historic Places
- NRHP reference No.: 100008508
- Added to NRHP: 28 December 2022
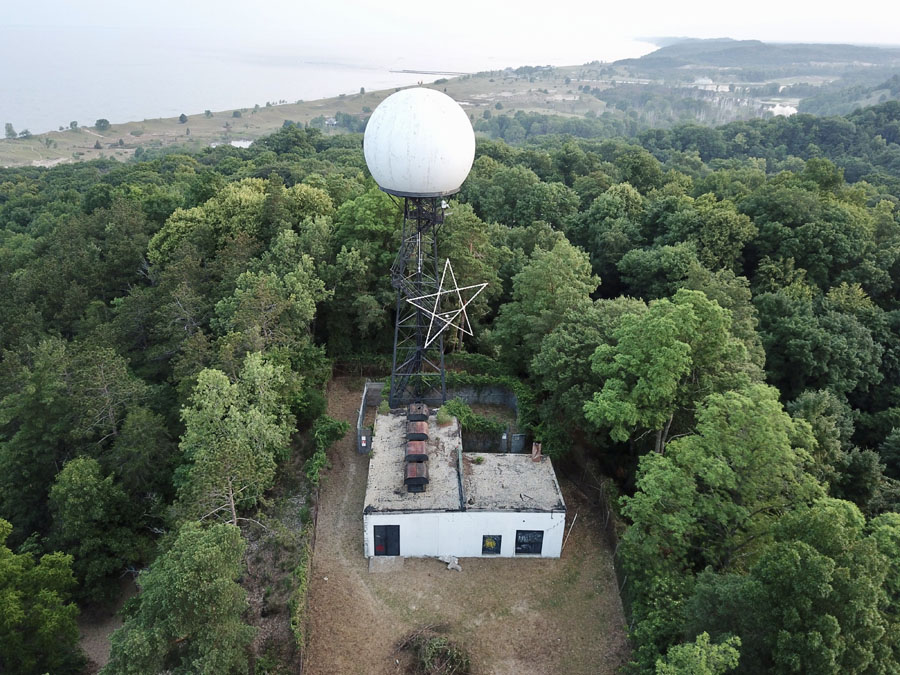
- Aerial view of Saugatuck Gap Filler Annex

Site information
- Type: SAGE Gap Filler Radar
- Controlled by: United States Air Force thru 1968 Now, owned by the City of Saugatuck
- Open to the public: No

Location
- Location of the Saugatuck Gap Filler Annex
- Coordinates: 42°39′41″N 086°12′33″W

Site history
- Built: Construction began mid-1956
- In use: 1958–1968

Garrison information
- Garrison: 781st Aircraft Control & Warning Squadron, later 781st Radar Squadron (SAGE)

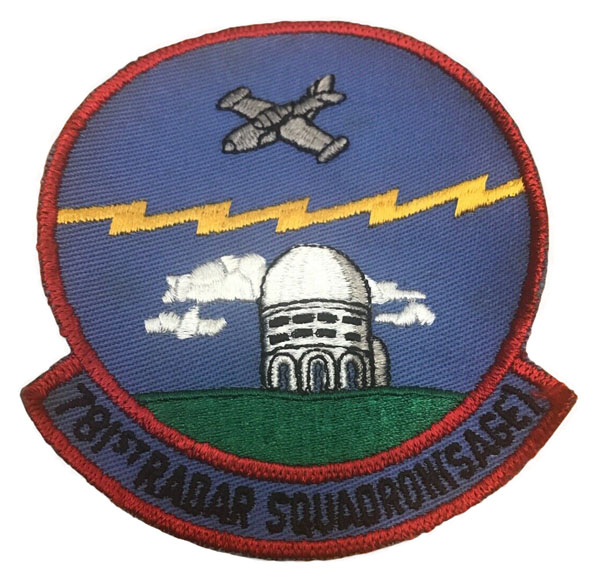
781st Radar Squadron (SAGE) patch

The Saugatuck Gap Filler Annex (ADC ID: P-67C, NORAD ID: Z-67C, Z-34G) is a decommissioned air defense radar installation previously of the United States Air Force. It served in the vast Cold War era Semi-Automatic Ground Environment (SAGE) air defense system. Of the hundreds of SAGE radars Saugatuck's is the only annex that remains nearly completely intact.

Located immediately across the Kalamazoo River from Saugatuck, Michigan, at the top of Mount Baldhead, a 230-foot dune on the shore of Lake Michigan, the annex was positioned to fill gaps in the coverage of long-range "heavy" radars sited further inland. The heavy radars searched for attacking Soviet bombers but were unable to detect aircraft flying low to the west of the dunes along Lake Michigan. Saugatuck's original AN/FPS-14 radar was commissioned in mid-1958 and operated until it was replaced with a more capable AN/FPS-18 in 1963. The FPS-18 radar served continuously until the site was decommissioned early in 1968. The city of Saugatuck purchased the building, tower, and radar equipment from the Air Force in 1969. Today, the installation appears very much as it did when operational with virtually all of the Cold War-era electronic equipment still in place.

The Saugatuck Gap Filler Annex was listed on the National Register of Historic Places in 2022, and efforts are underway by a group of volunteers to stabilize the site and secure funding for further preservation and restoration.

== The Cold War ==
=== The Strange Alliance ===
The United States, the United Kingdom, and the Union of Soviet Socialist Republics (Soviet Union) joined forces in World War II to become the key members of the Grand Alliance against the Axis Powers. It was always a "Strange Alliance," with a pronounced wariness between the United States, the world's greatest capitalist country, and the Soviet Union, the greatest socialist country. Post-war, with aggravations from both sides, the strain slowly crystallized into hostility approaching open conflict. Spanning decades, this period in history is known as the "Cold War."

Despite increasing Soviet aggression the United States felt its nuclear monopoly was an effective deterrent against attack until mid-1949 when the Soviet Union successfully tested its first atomic bomb, about four years sooner than had been anticipated. Earlier, they had unveiled the totally unexpected TU-4 bomber, a literal piece-by-piece copy of the United States B-29 with a one-way range sufficient to carry an atomic bomb from the Soviet Union to most large cities in the continental United States.

=== The Lashup System ===
In 1949, the only vestige of a North American continental air defense system was a motley collection of surplus WWII-era radars scattered sparsely across Canada and the northern United States. These were euphemistically named the Lashup System. Previously, lacking a viable threat, there had been little incentive to invest in upgrades to this network. With the sudden advent of the Soviet atom bomb and the TU-4, however, priorities were rapidly reassessed and the US Air Force launched an aggressive program to augment radar coverage of the most likely routes of attack from the north over Canada.

By 1952, the Lashup System had been reinforced with the emerging Permanent System radars arrayed along the border between the United States and Canada, soon supplemented by the Mid-Canada radar fence. The Ground Observer Corps (GOC), disbanded at the end of World War II, had been brought back into service and greatly expanded to assist in visually identifying aircraft and estimating altitude. The GOC's sightings and those detected by radar were reported by telephone to Manual Control Centers (MCCs) where the flight tracks of suspect aircraft and of the fighters dispatched to intercept them were plotted by hand on large plexiglass maps as controllers attempted to guide the fighter pilots by radio. But a number of exercises simulating attacking bombers revealed the MCCs were quickly overwhelmed by even modest incursions. Additionally, numerous blind spots were discovered in the coverage of the heavy radars where their ability to detect low-level aircraft was obstructed by terrain.

=== SAGE ===
The solution identified to address the issues with manual control was to use massive computers to analyze radar data, assess which defenses were most appropriate for a response, and automatically direct interception of suspected Soviet bombers, all with minimal human involvement. The system that emerged to satisfy this requirement was SAGE, the Semi-Automatic Ground Environment, a continent-wide network of enormous AN/FSQ-7 computers linked to hundreds of radars.

The number of radars in the SAGE network reached a peak in 1962 with nearly 250 heavy and gap-filler radars from the Permanent System, the remnants of the Lashup System, and some semi-mobile radars, all distributed primarily across the northern United States with some in Canada. In addition, there was the Distant Early Warning (DEW) Line radars just north of the Arctic Circle, Canada's Mid-Canada Line radar fence, and the Pine Tree Line radars across southern Canada. To these were added three ill-fated oil-rig-like Texas Tower radar installations built on the continental shelf off New England, a small number of radars carried by early warning aircraft and radar picket ships which operated off both coasts, and a few dirigibles.

To augment the Permanent System of heavy radars and resolve the low-level blind spots, around 240 gap-filler radar sites were planned between 1956 and 1962. Not all of the proposed sites were actually developed and, even if the buildings were constructed, not all received the radar equipment and towers as funds were slowly diverted to address the emerging threat of missile attack, highlighted by the launch of the Soviet Union's Sputnik satellite in 1957. Ultimately, a maximum of 131 gap-fillers were in service at any one time, the Saugatuck Gap Filler Annex among them.

== The Saugatuck Gap Filler Annex ==
=== History ===
The Air Force entered into a lease with the City of Saugatuck on 1 June 1956, for a small site at the top of Mt. Baldhead, the dune upon which the radar installation was constructed. Also included in the lease was an area at the eastern foot of the dune, below and slightly south of the radar site. This area was for ancillary equipment consisting principally of underground diesel fuel tanks and pumps used to move fuel to a storage tank at the top of the dune which supplied a generator in the annex building. There was also an easement connecting the two sites, running parallel to the stairs up the east face of the dune, to accommodate diesel fuel lines, electrical service, and telephone lines.

Construction of the equipment and generator building began on 23 August 1956, with an anticipated completion date in January 1957. Many gap-fillers were being constructed at this time and there was a delay before the radar equipment arrived. After installation and testing, the Bendix AN/FPS-14 radar became operational between 1 April – 30 June 1958, reporting to the 781st Aircraft Control and Warning (AC&W) Squadron at Custer Air Force Station (AFS), the "prime site," near Battle Creek, Michigan, where the heavy long-range and height-finder radars were located. The 781st's prime associated interceptor squadron was the 319th Fighter Interceptor Squadron, stationed at Bunker Hill Air Force Base in Peru, Indiana.

Like the other three gap-fillers under the control of Custer AFS, the Saugatuck Gap Filler Annex was designed to be unmanned and was operated remotely by the prime site. Also, like the other gap-fillers, the Saugatuck annex employed AN/FST-1 Coordinate Data Transmitter to send radar data to the immense AN/FSQ-7 computer housed at SAGE Direction Center DC-06, co-located with the 781st AC&W Squadron at Custer AFS. The AN/FST-1 was a state-of-the-art digital electronic device implemented almost entirely with vacuum tubes. It filtered spurious and fixed radar echoes from those of actual aircraft, converted the analog signals into digital data, then transmitted it at about 1600 bits/second via leased telephone lines using the first modem employed in an actual application outside of research.

As SAGE became fully operational, the squadron title was changed to 781st Radar Squadron (SAGE) on 1 October 1959. Custer AFS was known by Permanent System ID P-67 and Saugatuck, one of four subordinate gap-fillers, held site ID P-67C until 31 July 1963, when all SAGE radar squadron designations were changed to the NORAD prefix Z and Saugatuck became Z-67C.

Custer AFS operated the following Gap Filler sites in addition to its own heavy and height-finder radars:

- Midland, MI (P-67A/P-20G) 43°38′03″N 084°25′42″W
- Richland Center, IN (P-67B/P-73J) 41°07′05″N 086°14′28″W
- Saugatuck, MI (P-67C/Z-34G) 42°39′41″N 086°12′33″W
- Shelby, MI (P-67D/Z-34H) 43°36′00″N 086°20′25″W

The AN/FPS-14 radar was removed in June 1963, to be upgraded by a Bendix AN/FPS-18 radar. The FPS-18 was an improved design having a more refined ability to discriminate between fixed and moving targets and an output power of one megawatt, a little over twice that of the FPS-14. The additional power helped add definition to marginal returns, but effective range remained 48 miles due to limitations of the FST-1. A number of months lapsed between the removal of the old radar and installation of the new equipment. The AN/FPS-18 radar finally became operational on 14 December 1963, and remains in place in the equipment room today. At the same time, a rigid radome was installed to protect the new antenna at the top of the tower. This is the iconic white ball still visible for miles in all directions.

Control of the Saugatuck radar annex was transferred to the 752nd Radar Squadron (SAGE) on 27 January 1965, located at Empire Air Force Station, Z-34, near Empire, Michigan. The Saugatuck Gap Filler Annex was redesignated Z-34G and recommissioned on 2 February 1965. As the missile threat continued to gain priority, the 752nd received notice on 31 March 1968, that operation of all gap-fillers would terminate. The squadron was directed to drain and flush the transmitter coolant systems, tape the doors of the equipment cabinets, and prepare the diesel generators for storage.

On 1 April 1968, the Saugatuck Gap Filler Annex was permanently deactivated. After removing the diesel generator and all spare parts, the Air Force terminated its lease of the annex site effective 31 December 1968. Possession of the land reverted to the city of Saugatuck, which purchased the building, tower, and all the radar equipment for $250 in July 1969.

Apparently, removal of the radar antenna had been scheduled at some point prior to Saugatuck's purchasing the radar station because, very shortly after the sale, an Air Force crew appeared and began to dismantle the radome. The misunderstanding was quickly straightened out and the crew reassembled the dome without removing any equipment.

=== Recent history ===
In the decades following the city's purchase of the radar, the building and the equipment inside slowly yielded to the passage of the years. Occasional stop-gap work was performed to seal roof leaks and secure the site against souvenir collectors but, high atop the dune, it was basically out of sight, out of mind, and the condition of the annex steadily worsened. At one point, the city of Saugatuck formally set aside funds for the demolition of the aging building, awareness of the site's importance having been lost with the succession of new city councils. A handful of local residents responded to each new threat by alerting council members to the radar's history and rarity. Eventually, appreciation for the importance of the radar station grew. It was the subject of a standing-room-only History Center presentation in August 2016 and became the anchor of the center's museum exhibit for 2017 and 2018 which included a visit by one of the Air Force technicians who had maintained the radar when it was operational.

In September 2017, the Saugatuck-Douglas History Center (SDHC) submitted a preliminary questionnaire to the Michigan State Historic Preservation Office (SHPO) to determine if the Saugatuck Gap Filler Annex was eligible for inclusion in the National Register of Historic Places (NRHP). SHPO, which acts as the gateway to the NRHP, concluded the annex was significant for its role in the nationwide Cold War SAGE system and appeared to merit listing on the Register. Thus began an initiative to nominate the Saugatuck radar annex to the National Register, spanning five years, including three major drafts, and navigating the upheaval and government shut-downs of the COVID-19 epidemic.

In support of the NRHP nomination, research was conducted to determine how many of the original SAGE system radar sites remain and their present condition. The database of gap-filler sites gathered and maintained by The Air Defense Radar Veteran's Association at www.radomes.org was used to inspect each location via Google Maps satellite view to determine if any structures remained. Where necessary to clarify their status, physical visits were made to sites, and owners or controlling agencies were contacted. The results indicate that, of the hundreds of SAGE system radars scattered across the United States when SAGE was fully implemented, only four remain with structure and antenna appearing substantially as they did during the Cold War era. Of these, the Saugatuck Gap Filler Annex is last to have survived almost completely intact with most of the Cold War era radar equipment still in place in the radome and building, although all of the vacuum tubes and fragile equipment are currently stored off-site.

Responding to input from concerned residents, the Mt. Baldhead Radar Station Preservation Work Group was established by the Saugatuck City Council, in May 2021, to investigate and report on approaches to dealing with the deteriorating radar annex. Primary concerns were liability regarding trespassers being injured as they attempted to gain access to the antenna tower and the roof of the building and the elimination of unsightly graffiti on the building's walls and exterior equipment. Options to be considered ranged from complete demolition to full restoration. Stabilizing the structure and improving security against vandalism and trespassers emerged as the most effective immediate path, basically freezing the site in its present state to buy more time for consideration of long-term prospects.

With the aid of volunteers from other area organizations the work group removed the daunting mass of vegetation that had sprung up on the annex grounds, fences, and structures over the years, conveying a sense the site had been abandoned and providing a screen for vandals and trespassers. Serious leakage issues threatening the roof structure and building interior were temporarily addressed and volunteers removed graffiti from the exterior walls, sealed gaps and voids in the cement block, and applied a new coat of paint all around. An organization specializing in the preservation and rehabilitation of historic structures was consulted to suggest methods by which deterioration of the foundation and block walls could most effectively be addressed. Security cameras were installed with signage to alert visitors that the site is not open to the public and is under surveillance.

The workgroup then took on responsibility for routine maintenance of the site; mowing, keeping the foliage under control, touching up the paint, and general upkeep. The city purchased a mower specifically for the site and, following up on the group's initial legwork interviewing fence contractors, had repairs made to the original fence and a new section installed to close a large gap where a stretch of fence had been removed years ago.

=== Present Status ===
Having performed its function, the Mt. Baldhead Radar Station Preservation Work Group was dissolved 31 December 2021 per its mandate and the Friends of the Mt. Baldhead Radar Station was formed to maintain the grounds and structures. The new group is organizing as a tax-exempt 501(c)(3) and will soon be in a position to accept donations for badly needed roof and foundation repairs.

The lengthy process of listing the Saugatuck Gap Filler Annex on the National Register of Historic Places was successfully concluded in late 2022. The nomination was formally presented to the Michigan State Historic Preservation Review Board at their 23 September 2022 meeting where it received a unanimous vote approving submission to the Keeper of the National Register of Historic Places for final acceptance. After review by the Keeper, the annex was officially listed on the Register 28 December 2022. In response to its listing, the annex was also subject of a special press release by the State Historic Preservation Office, an honor reserved for "particularly interesting National Register nominations." Inclusion on the Register will open doors for grants and funding to support additional preservation of the building, equipment, and tower.

=== Cellular Antennas ===
Over the years there has been growing interest in improving Saugatuck area cell phone coverage, particularly at popular Oval Beach on the Lake Michigan shore 0.4 miles west of the radar annex. More recently focus has been on a proposal submitted by AT&T in early 2023 to install cellular antennas inside the radome at the top of the radar's antenna tower. Early in this process the Friends of the Mt. Baldhead Radar Station were invited to provide consultation based on their accumulated knowledge of the site and its historical importance and integrity. In June 2023 the group commissioned a complete internal and external three dimensional laser scan of the tower, radome, and antenna structures as well as the equipment building and perimeter fences. The scan provided data from which CAD drawings were created with an accuracy of ±0.5 mm to facilitate design of cellular antenna mounts that will least impact the integrity of the radar tower and ensure no alterations are made to the radar antenna. The Friends also provided the Saugatuck City Council with a position paper stating the importance of protecting the historical integrity of the AN/FPS-18 radar antenna which is a rare artifact, one of four known to have survived intact, one on display at a museum.

=== Future ===
With the annex's acceptance to the National Register of Historic Places and the site stabilized and secured, attention now turns to possible inclusion in the National Historic Landmarks program where the National Park Service released a new theme study in October 2022 focused on Cold War defense sites. This would be an even greater level of recognition than the National Register, but requires hurdling a higher bar to qualify.

The Friends of the Mt. Baldhead Radar Station continue to actively advocate preservation of the Saugatuck Gap Filler Annex, the last nearly intact SAGE system radar facility in public hands where the Cold War structures and radar equipment can be examined in situ.

== Description ==
The Saugatuck Gap Filler Annex is located at the top of Mount Baldhead, a small dune. The site consists of a steel antenna tower with a large fiberglass spherical radome at the top and a nearby equipment and generator building containing AN/FPS-18 radar set and related equipment. A perimeter fence surrounds the installation. The tower is a three-legged steel structure standing 70 feet high. It slopes inwards up to a 20-foot diameter antenna deck above. Steep metal stairs wrap around the tower. A 26-ft diameter spherical white radome sits on the antenna deck. Below, the equipment and generator building is an L-shaped concrete block structure with a flat roof. It contains two rooms, one of which houses two parallel rows of electronics cabinets; the other room previously housed a diesel generator.
