= 121st Operations Group =

121st Operations Group

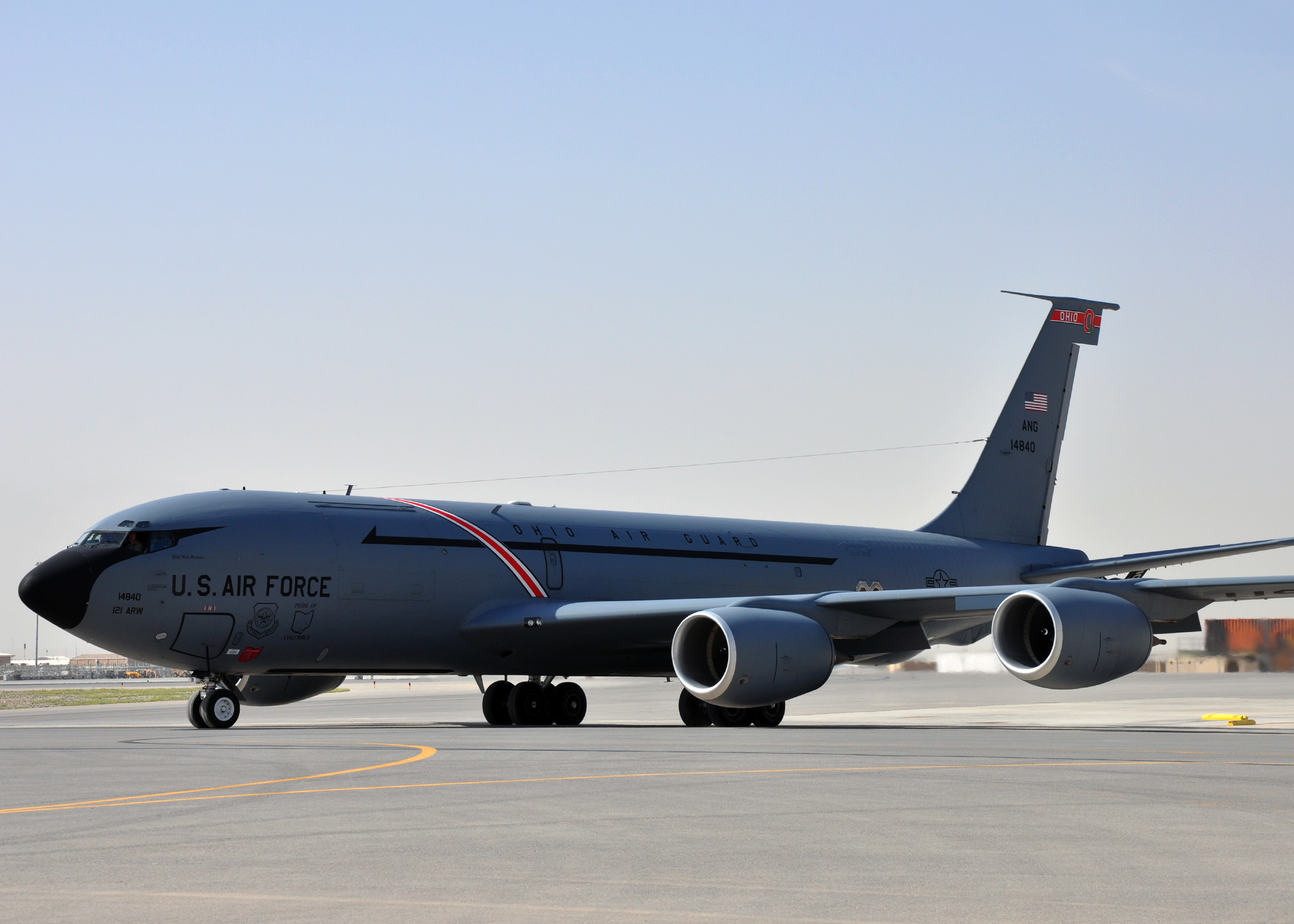
- Group Boeing KC-135R Stratotanker deployed to Kandahar International Airport in 2019
- Active: 1942–1946; 1946–1952; 1952–1974; 1993–present
- Country: United States
- Branch: Air National Guard
- Role: Air refueling
- Part of: Ohio Air National Guard
- Garrison/HQ: Rickenbacker Air National Guard Base, Ohio
- Motto: Fighters for Victory (World War II) Semper Omnia (Latin for 'All Things at All Times')
- Engagements: European Theater of Operations
- Decorations: Distinguished Unit Citation; French Croix de Guerre with Palm

Insignia
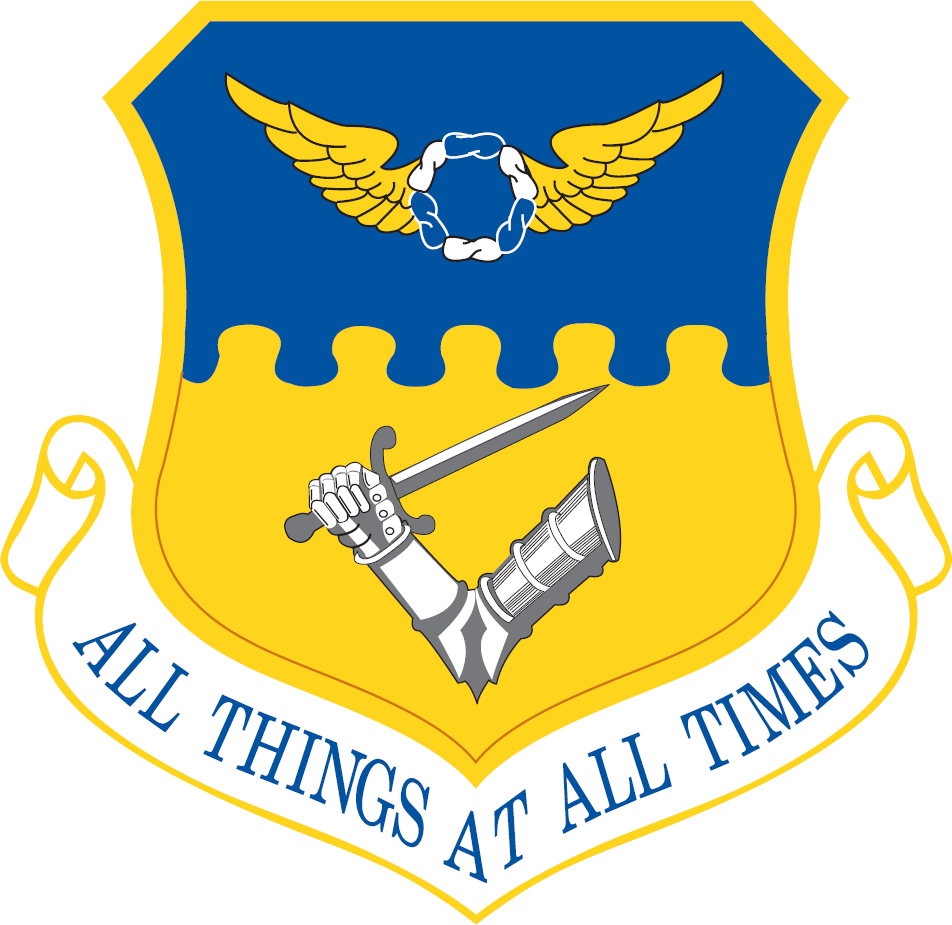
- 121st Operations Group emblem (Note: Approved 27 May 1953. While assigned to the 121st Wing, the group uses the wing emblem with the group designation on the scroll. AF Instruction 84-105, Organizational Lineage, Honors and History, 27 April 2017, paragraph 3.3.3.)

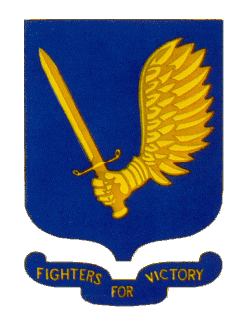
- 357th Fighter Group emblem

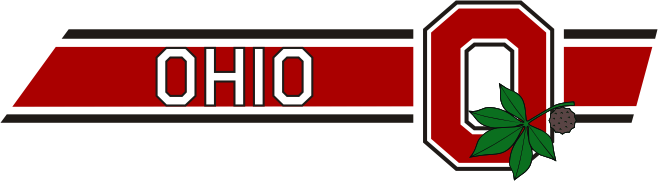
- Tail stripe

The 121st Operations Group is an active unit of the Ohio Air National Guard, stationed at Rickenbacker Air National Guard Base, Ohio, where it flies Boeing KC-135 Stratotankers.

The group was first activated in 1942 as the 357th Fighter Group. After training in the United States, it deployed to the European Theater of Operations, where it engaged in combat until V-E Day. It earned two Distinguished Unit Citations and a French Croix de Guerre with Palm for its combat actions. It became part of the occupation forces until inactivating in August 1946 and transferring its assets to another unit.

The group was redesignated the 121st Fighter Group and organized in the National Guard in 1946, although it did not receive Federal recognition until 1948. It served as a fighter unit until inactivating in 1974, and was mobilized twice, in 1961 and 1968. The group was activated again in 1993 in its current role.

== History ==
=== World War II ===
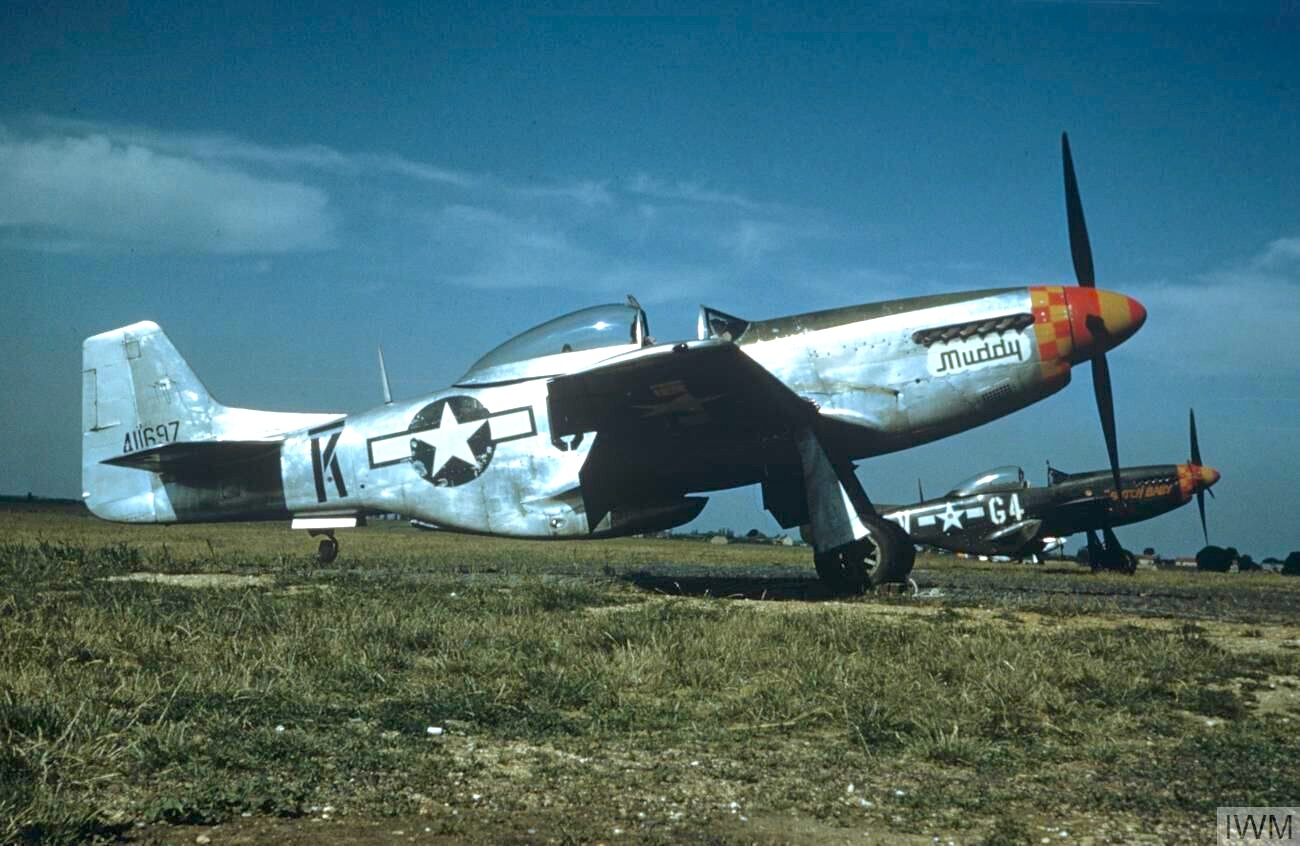
P-51s of the 357th Fighter Group (Note: Aircraft are North American P-51K-4-NT Mustang Muddy (G4-K), serial 44-11697 (scrapped in England in December 1945) and North American P-51D-10-NA Mustang, Butch Baby (G4-V), serial 44-14798 (scrapped in June 1945 following a landing accident). Dirkx, Marco (18 August 2025). "1944 USAF Serial Numbers". Joe Baugher’s Serial Number List.)

The group was first activated at Hamilton Field, California and assigned the 362nd, 363rd and 364th Fighter Squadrons It trained with Bell P-39 Airacobras until November 1943, when it sailed for Great Britain aboard the RMS Queen Elizabeth.

Upon arrival at RAF Raydon, England, the group became part of Ninth Air Force and began equipping with North American P-51B Mustangs. In February 1944, it moved to RAF Leiston and transferred to Eighth Air Force, becoming Eighth's first Mustang group. It flew its first combat mission on 14 February 1944 The group operated from Leiston for the remainder of the war. It claimed 609.5 aerial victories and destroyed an additional 106.5 planes on the ground. The group was awarded two Distinguished Unit Citations for defending American heavy bombers from attacks by German interceptor aircraft and a French Croix de Guerre with Palm for contributing to the liberation of France.

In July 1945, the group moved to AAF Station Neubiberg, Germany, where it became part of the occupation forces. It was inactivated in August 1946, and its personnel and equipment were transferred to the 33rd Fighter Group, which was simultaneously activated.

=== Ohio Air National Guard ===
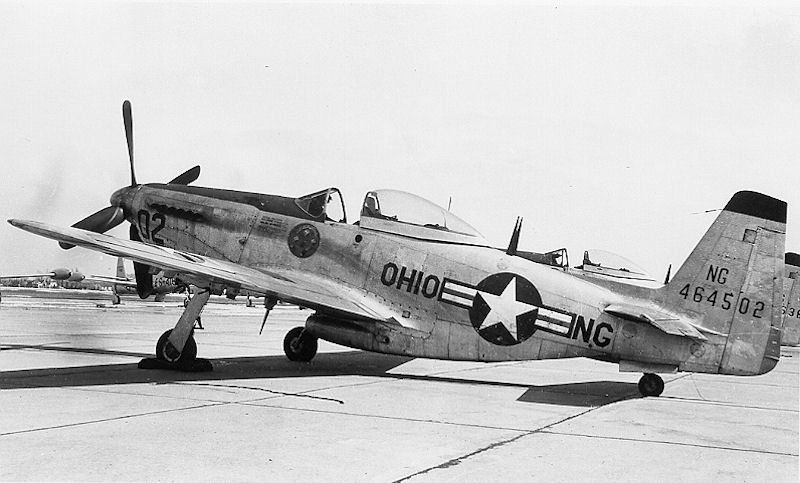
164th Squadron P-51H Mustang

The group was redesignated the 121st Fighter Group and allotted to the Air National Guard the day after it was inactivated in Germany. Although organized by the State of Ohio later that year, it was not extended federal recognition until 20 June 1948, when it was assigned to the 55th Fighter Wing. The group was assigned its World War II squadrons, which had been allotted to the National Guard and renumbered. The 162nd Fighter Squadron (former 362nd) was located at Dayton Municipal Airport;the 164th Fighter Squadron (former 363rd) at Mansfield Lahm Regional Airport, while the 166th Fighter Squadron (former 364th) was located with the group at Lockbourne Air Force Base. The squadrons were equipped with F-51D Mustangs.

In the fall of 1950, the National Guard reorganized its tactical units along the Wing Base Organization system of the regular Air Force, which placed operational groups and their supporting units under a single wing. On 31 October 1950 the 121st Fighter Wing was established, drawing most of its personnel from the 55th Fighter Wing. The 121st Fighter Group and its assigned squadrons were assigned to the new 121st Wing.

Although the 121st was not called to active duty for the Korean War, its 166th Fighter Squadron was activated on 10 February 1951 and assigned to the 122nd Fighter-Interceptor Wing. In February 1952, the 122nd Wing was inactivated and the 166th was reassigned to the 4706th Defense Wing. It moved to Youngstown Municipal Airport, Ohio, where it was assigned to the 4708th Defense Wing in August 1952. On 1 November 1952, the squadron's aircraft, personnel and mission were transferred to the 86th Fighter-Interceptor Squadron, and it was returned to state control.

In July 1952, the 112th Fighter-Bomber Squadron at Akron-Canton Airport was added to the group upon its return from active duty. The 162nd Squadron moved to Springfield Municipal Airport in August 1955 and the 112th Squadron moved to Toledo Municipal Airport in April 1956.

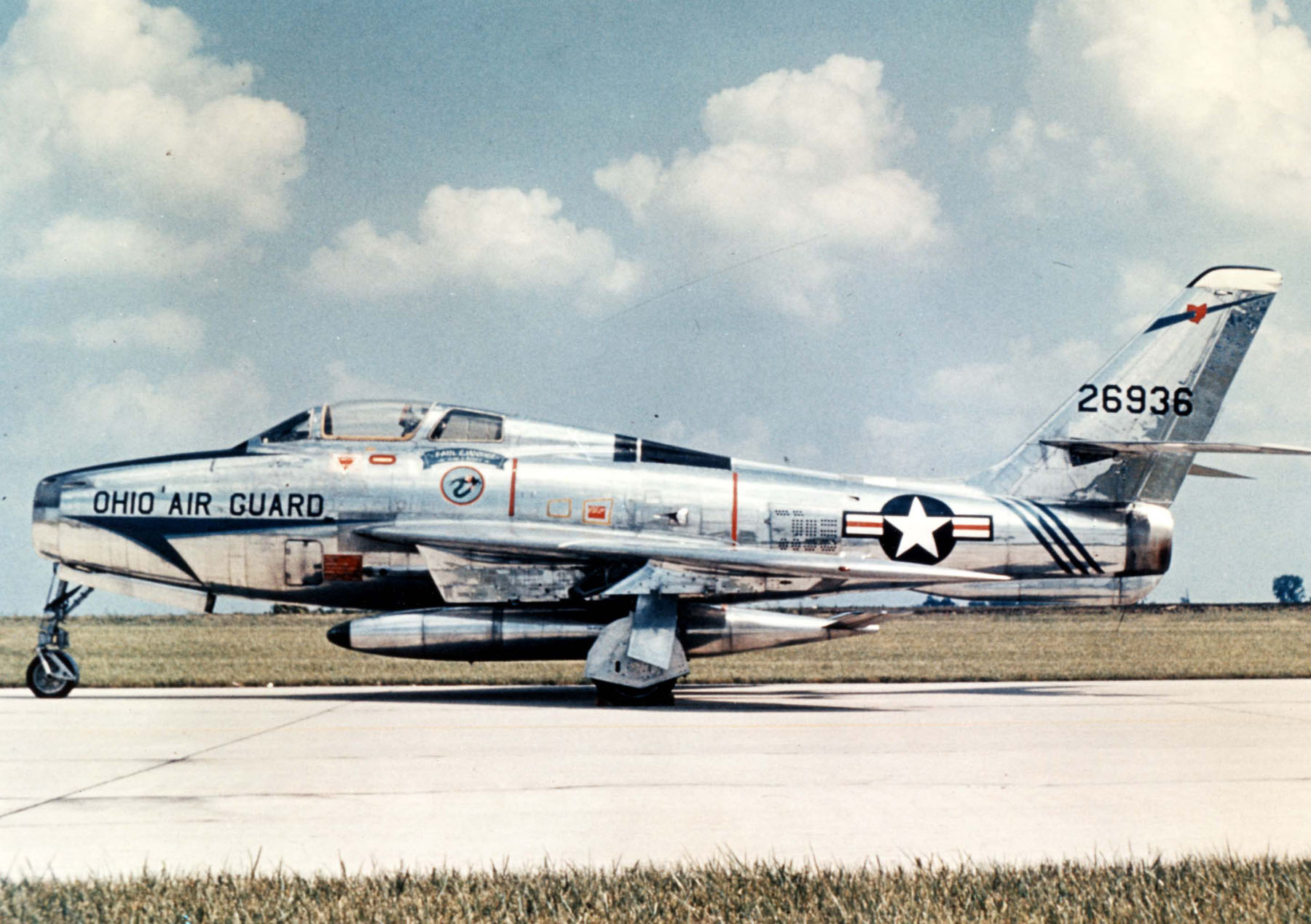
Group F-84F Thunderstreak (Note: Aircraft is Republic F-84F-55-RE Thunderstreak, serial 52-6936 of the 166th Tactical Fighter Squadron. This plane crashed near Baer Field on 15 May 1965. Dirkx, Marco (23 September 2025). "1952 USAF Serial Numbers". Joe Baugher’s Serial Number List..)

The group, with the exception of the 115th Tactical Fighter Squadron, (Note: The 115th was transferred to the direct control of the 121st Tactical Fighter Wing.) was called to active duty for the Berlin Crisis of 1961 in September 1961. However, financial considerations meant that only the 166th Squadron, plus some supporting elements, deployed to Étain-Rouvres Air Base, France in November as part of Operation Stair Step. The 121st Group and 162nd and 164th Squadrons remained in Ohio, ready to reinforce the 166th if needed. In December, United States Air Forces in Europe (USAFE) formed the 7121st Tactical Wing at Etain to command the deployed units. USAFE activated the 391st Tactical Fighter Squadron in May 1962, and starting in July, the 166th began transferring its planes and equipment to the 391st. By August, Guard personnel had returned to Ohio.

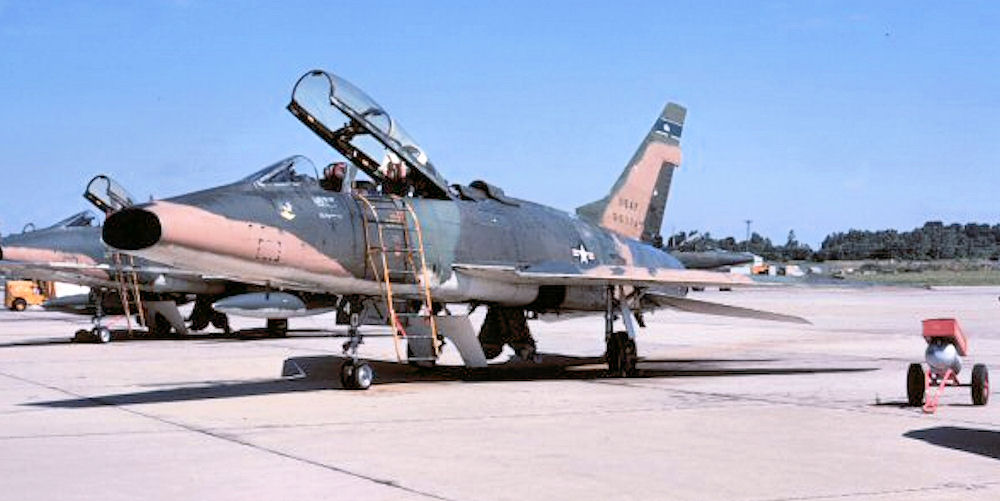
Group F-100 Super Sabre (Note: Aircraft is North American F-100F-5-NA Super Sabre, serial 56-3740 of the 166th Tactical Fighter Squadron. It was sent to the Military Aircraft Storage and Disposition Center on 24 September 1969 and converted to a QF-100 drone. It was shot down on 14 March 1990. Dirkx, Marco (23 September 2025). "1956 USAF Serial Numbers". Joe Baugher’s Serial Number List..)

Because it was not practical to put an entire National Guard wing on a single installation for day-to-day operations, the group's squadrons were located on bases as “augmented squadrons” containing support elements needed to sustain operations. By the law at the time Guardsmen could only be activated as members of a mobilized unit. This meant that, even when only operational and maintenance elements were needed for mobilization, the entire “augmented squadron” had to be called to active duty, including unneeded administrative personnel. The response was to replace the “augmented squadron” with a group including functional squadrons that could be mobilized as a group, or individually. On 15 October 1962, tactical fighter groups were activated at Springfield (178th) and Mansfield (179th) and the 162nd and 164th Squadrons were assigned to the new groups. (Note: The new groups included a combat support squadron, a materiel squadron, and a tactical infirmary in addition to the tactical squadron and a group headquarters.)

The group was called to active duty again during the Pueblo Crisis in 1968. Most of the active duty fighter wings of the 833rd Air Division had deployed to respond to the capture of the ship, and the 121st and other Air National Guard units were called up in April 1968 to replace these active duty units. While the group was assigned to the 833rd, in July its 166th Tactical Fighter Squadron was reassigned to the 354th Tactical Fighter Wing and deployed with it to Kunsan Air Base, South Korea. The group and squadron were returned to state control in June 1969.

In 1974, the Air Force decided that tactical groups of the Air National Guard that were located on the same stations as their parent wings were an unneeded layer of supervision. As a result, the 121st Tactical Fighter Group was inactivated on 9 December 1974.

In the early 1990s, however, the Air Force reorganied under the Objective Wing. Under this system, the group was redesignated the 121st Operations Group and reactivated on 15 January 1992.

== Lineage ==
- Established as the 357th Fighter Group and activated on 1 December 1942

Inactivated on 20 August 1946
Redesignated 121st Fighter Group and allotted to the National Guard on 21 August 1946
Organized on 5 November 1946
Received Federal recognition on 26 June 1948
Redesignated 121st Fighter-Bomber Group on 16 October 1952
Redesignated 121st Fighter-Interceptor Group on 1 November 1952
Redesignated 121st Fighter-Bomber Group on 1 November 1957
Redesignated 121st Tactical Fighter Group (Special Delivery) on 1 November 1958
Redesignated 121st Tactical Fighter Group on 1 September 1961
Federalized and ordered to active service on 1 October 1961
Released from active duty and returned to Ohio state control on 20 August 1962
Federalized and ordered to active service on 25 April 1968
Released from active duty and returned to Ohio state control on 18 June 1969
Inactivated on 9 December 1974
Redesignated 121st Operations Group
Activated on 16 January 1993

=== Assignments ===
- IV Fighter Command, 1 December 1942
- San Francisco Fighter Wing, 1943
- IX Fighter Command, 30 November 1943
- 66th Fighter Wing, 31 January 1944
- XII Tactical Air Command, 21 November 1945 – 20 August 1946
- 55th Fighter Wing, 26 June 1948
- 121st Fighter Wing (later 121st Fighter-Bomber Wing, 121st Fighter-Interceptor Wing, 121st Fighter-Bomber Wing, 121st Tactical Fighter Wing, 1 November 1950
- 833rd Air Division, 25 April 1968
- 121st Tactical Fighter Wing, 18 June 1969 – 9 December 1974
- 121st Air Refueling Wing, 16 January 1993 – present

=== Components ===
- 112th Fighter-Bomber Squadron (later 112th Fighter-Interceptor Squadron, 112th Tactical Fighter Squadron): 20 July 1952 – 11 December 1961
- 121st Operations Support Squadron: 15 January 1993 – present
- 162nd Fighter Squadron: see 362nd Squadron
- 164th Fighter Squadron: see 363rd Squadron
- 166th Fighter Squadron: see 364th Squadron
- 362nd Fighter Squadron (later 162nd Fighter Squadron, 162nd Fighter-Bomber Squadron, 162nd Fighter-Interceptor Squadron, 162nd Tactical Fighter Squadron): 1 December 1942 – 20 August 1946, 26 June 1948 – 15 October 1962
- 363rd Fighter Squadron (later 164th Fighter Squadron, 164th Fighter-Bomber Squadron, 164th Fighter-Interceptor Squadron, 164th Tactical Fighter Squadron): 1 December 1942 – 20 August 1946, 26 June 1948 – 15 October 1962
- 364th Fighter Squadron (later 166th Fighter Squadron, 166th Fighter-Bomber Squadron, 166th Fighter-Interceptor Squadron, 166th Tactical Fighter Squadron, 166th Air Refueling Squadron): 1 December 1942 – 20 August 1946, 26 June 1948 – 10 February 1951, 1 November 1952 –11 December 1961, 20 August 1962 – 5 July 1968, 10 June 1969 – 9 December 1974, 15 January 1993 – present

=== Stations ===
- Hamilton Field, California, 1 December 1942
- Tonopah Army Air Field, Nevada, 6 March 1943
- Santa Rosa Army Air Field, California, 3 June 1943
- Oroville Army Air Field, California, 18 August 1943
- Casper Army Air Field, Wyoming, 7 October - 9 November 1943
- RAF Raydon (Station 157), England, 1 December 1943
- RAF Leiston (Station 373), England, 1 February 1944
- AAF Station Neubiberg (R-85), Germany, 20 Jul 1945 – 20 Aug 1946
- Lockbourne Air Force Base, Ohio, 26 June 1948
- Dayton Municipal Airport, January 1951
- Lockbourne Air Force Base, February 1954
- Vandalia, Ohio, January 1956
- Lockbourne Air Force Base (later Rickenbacker Air Force Base), Ohio, 1 March 1960 – 9 January 1974
- Rickenbacker Air National Guard Base, Ohio, 16 January 1993 – present\

=== Aircraft ===
- Bell P-39 Airacobra, 1943
- North American (later F-51) Mustang, 1944–1946, 1948–1954
- Republic F-84 Thunderjet, 1950–1951, 1955–1958
- Lockheed F-80 Shooting Star, 1954–1955
- Republic F-84F Thunderstreak, 1957–1962
- North American F-100 Super Sabre, 1962–1974
- Boeing KC-135 Stratotanker, 1993–present
