= 398th =

398th may refer to:

- 398th Air Expeditionary Group, provisional United States Air Force unit assigned to the United States Air Forces in Europe
- 398th Bombardment Squadron, inactive United States Air Force unit last assigned with the 92d Operations Group at Fairchild Air Force Base, Washington
- 398th Fighter-Interceptor Squadron, inactive United States Air Force unit, last assigned to the Air Defense Command stationed at Hamilton AFB, California

== See also ==
- 398 (number)
- 398, the year 398 (CCCXCVIII) of the Julian calendar
- 398 BC
