= 164 Squadron =

164 Squadron or 164th Squadron may refer to:

- No. 164 Squadron RAF, a unit of the United Kingdom Royal Air Force was a fighter squadron during the Second World War
- 164th Airlift Squadron, a unit of the United States Air Force
- HMMT-164 (Marine Medium Helicopter Training Squadron 164), (HMM(T)-164), is a United States Marine Corps Fleet Replacement Squadron
