= MYV =

MYV may refer to:

- Erzya language, a language spoken in parts of the Republic of Mordovia and in adjacent regions in Russia
- Yuba County Airport, an airport located near Marysville, California, United States
