= 398th Fighter-Interceptor Squadron =

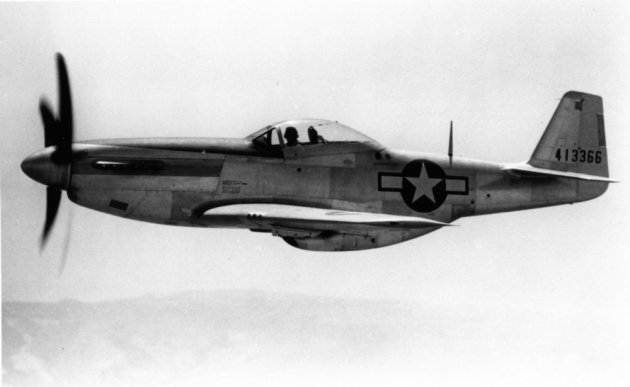
- P-51 Mustang, last plane flown by the squadron
- Active: 1942–1945; 1956–1957
- Country: United States
- Branch: United States Air Force
- Role: Fighter training

Insignia
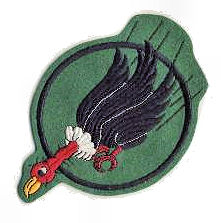
- 398th Fighter Squadron emblem (Note: Approved 30 August 1944. Description: Over and through a light yellow green disc, border equally divided black and white with thin black neat line, a caricatured black condor with white feathers about neck, red head and neck, yellow orange beak and red feet, diving toward dexter base and trailing black speed lines.)

The 398th Fighter-Interceptor Squadron is an inactive United States Air Force unit, last assigned to Air Defense Command, at Hamilton AFB, California. The squadron was inactivated on 8 February 1957 before being manned or equipped.

== History ==
Air defense and replacement training until March 1944, and afterward replacement training plus air support for army maneuvers until August 1945.

The squadron was redesignated the '398th Fighter-Interceptor Squadron and activated in November 1956 at Hamilton AFB and scheduled to receive F-104s. Before personnel or equipment were in place, the unit was inactivated on 18 February 1957.

== Lineage ==
- Constituted as the 398th Fighter Squadron on 26 May 1943

Activated on 1 August 1943
Redesignated 398th Fighter-Bomber Squadron on 5 April 1944
Redesignated 398th Fighter Squadron on 5 June 1944
Inactivated on 7 November 1945

- Redesignated 398th Fighter-Interceptor Squadron on 18 September 1956

Activated on 18 November 1956
Inactivated on 8 February 1957

=== Assignments ===
- 369th Fighter Group (later 369th Fighter-Bomber Group, 369th Fighter Group), 1 August 1943
- II Tactical Air Division, 10 August 1945
- III Tactical Air Command, 1 September 1945 (attached to 372d Fighter Group after 2 October 1945)
- XIX Tactical Air Command, 25 October – 7 November 1945 (attached to 372d Fighter Group)
- Western Air Defense Force, 18 November 1956 – 8 February 1957

=== Stations ===
- Hamilton Field, California, August 1943
- Marysville Army Air Field, California, 3 November 1943
- Oroville Army Air Field, California, 29 January 1944
- Hamilton Field, California, 13 March 1944
- DeRidder Army Air Base, Louisiana, 27 March 1944
- Stuttgart Army Air Field, Arkansas, 8 February 1945
- Alexandria Army Air Field, Louisiana, 2 October – 7 November 1945
- Hamilton Air Force Base, California, 18 November 1956 – 8 February 1957

=== Aircraft ===
- Bell P-39 Airacobra, 1943–1944
- North American A-36 Apache, 1944
- Curtiss P-40 Warhawk 1944–1945
- North American P-51 Mustang, 1945
