= 369th Fighter Group =

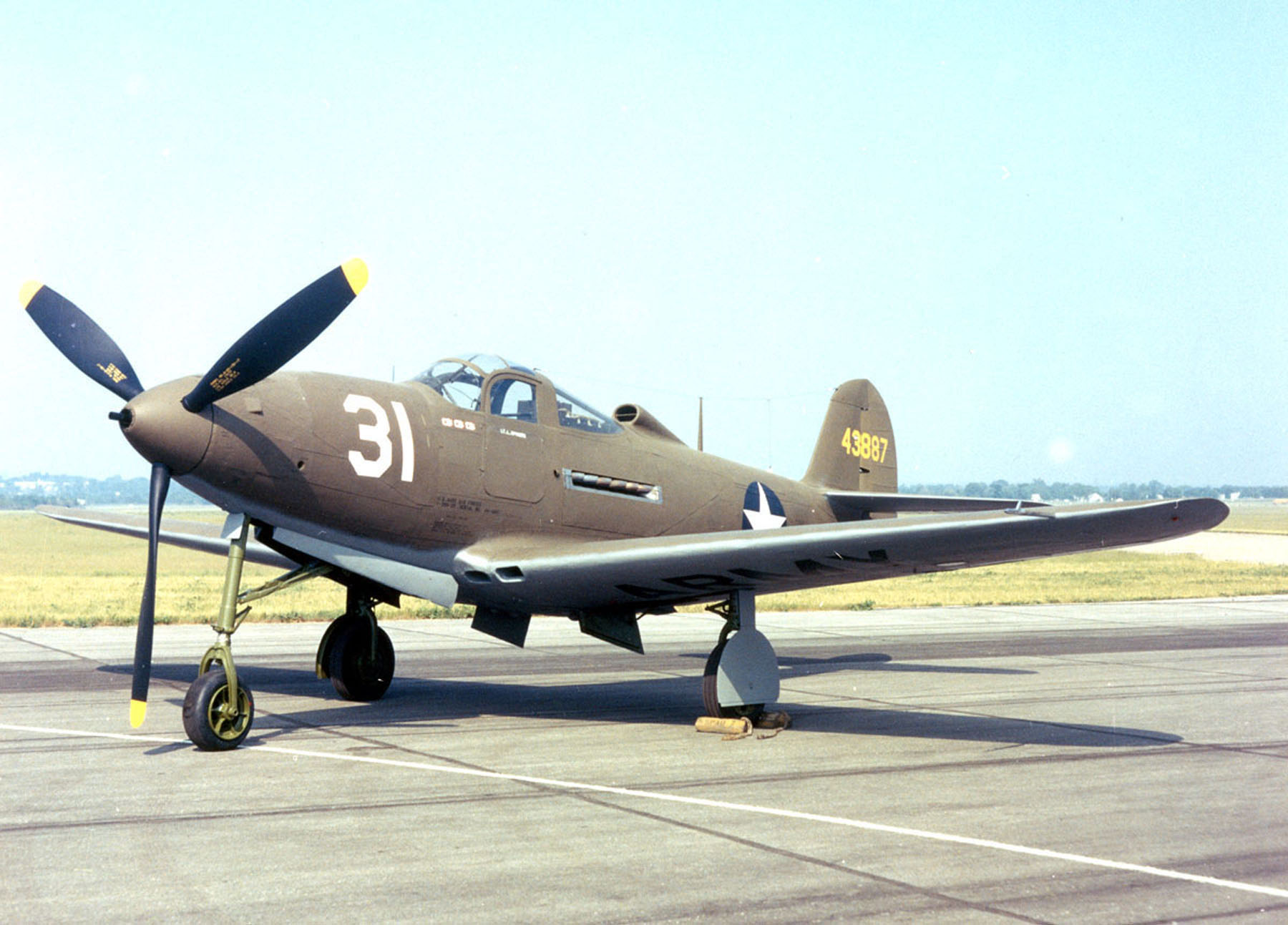
- A Bell P-39 Airacobra as flown by the group
- Active: 1943–1945
- Disbanded: 1992
- Country: United States
- Branch: United States Army Air Forces
- Type: Fighter

The 369th Fighter Group is a disbanded United States Air Force unit. Its last assignment was with Third Air Force, stationed at Stuttgart Army Air Field, Arkansas. It was inactivated on 10 August 1945.

The 369th was initially a training group in California during World War II as part of Fourth Air Force. It moved to Louisiana in the spring of 1944 and became part of Third Air Force in March 1944. There, it took part in air-ground maneuvers and demonstrations until inactivating in August 1945. The group was redesignated in inactive status as the 369th Tactical Fighter Group in 1985, but was disbanded in 1992.

== History ==
=== World War II ===
The 369th Fighter Group was activated at Hamilton Field, California on 1 August 1943. The 398th, 399th and 400th Fighter Squadrons, flying Bell P-39 Airacobras were assigned to the group. The group moved to Marysville Army Air Field, California in November and began operations as a fighter Replacement Training Unit (RTU). RTUs were oversized units that trained individual pilots or aircrews.

Like most RTUs, the group began a split operation, with group headquarters and the 398th Squadron at Marysville, while the 399th Squadron was at Redding Army Air Field, and the 400th moved to Oroville Army Air Field. In January the group and 398th Squadron joined the 400th at Oroville, but the 399th remained at Redding.

In March 1944, as Army Air Forces training requirements were reduced, the group and its squadrons all returned to Hamilton Field. A few days later, the group was transferred to Third Air Force and moved to DeRidder Army Air Base, Louisiana.

At DeRidder, the group took part in air-ground maneuvers and demonstrations, participating in the Louisiana Maneuvers in the summer of 1944 and in similar activities. In July 1945, its 399th and 400th Squadrons were reorganized as reconnaissance squadrons and reassigned from the group, moving to Will Rogers Field, Oklahoma. On 10 August, the group's sole remaining squadron, the 398th, was reassigned and the group was inactivated.

=== Subsequent history ===
Although each of its squadrons later served in the United States Air Force after World War II, the group was never again active. It was redesignated as a tactical fighter unit in 1985, but disbanded in September 1992.

== Lineage ==
- Constituted as 369th Fighter Group on 26 May 1943

Activated on 1 August 1943
Redesignated 369th Fighter-Bomber Group on 5 April 1944
Redesignated 369th Fighter Group on 5 June 1944
Inactivated on 10 August 1945

- Redesignated 369th Tactical Fighter Group on 31 July 1985 (remained inactive)
- Disbanded on 9 September 1992

=== Assignments ===
- San Francisco Fighter Wing, 1 August 1943
- III Fighter Command, c. 28 March 1944 – 10 August 1945

=== Stations ===
- Hamilton Field, California, 1 August 1943
- Marysville Army Air Field, California, c. 5 November 1943
- Oroville Army Air Field, California, 28 January 1944
- Hamilton Field, California, 16 March 1944
- DeRidder Army Air Base, Louisiana, 28 March 1944
- Stuttgart Army Air Field, Arkansas, 8 February – 10 August 1945

=== Components ===
- 398th Fighter Squadron: 1 August 1943 – 10 August 1945
- 399th Fighter Squadron: 1 August 1943 – 7 July 1945
- 400th Fighter Squadron: 1 August 1943 – 7 July 1945

=== Aircraft ===
- Bell P-39 Airacobra, 1943–1944
- North American A-36 Apache, 1944
- Curtiss P-40 Warhawk 1944–1945
- North American P-51 Mustang, 1945

=== Campaigns ===
Campaign Streamer	Campaign	Dates	Notes
	American Theater without inscription	1 August 1943 – 10 August 1945	
