= 57th Weather Reconnaissance Squadron =

57th Reconnaissance Squadron
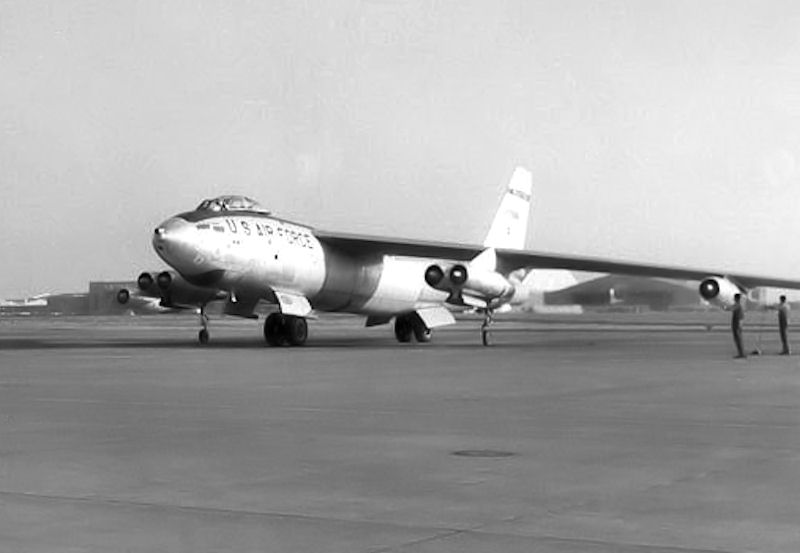
- Last active duty Boeing WB-47 with the 57th Weather Reconnaissance Squadron
- Active: 1943–1946; 1947–1949; 1951–1958; 1962–1969
- Country: United States
- Branch: United States Air Force
- Role: Weather reconnaissance
- Decorations: Air Force Outstanding Unit Award

Insignia
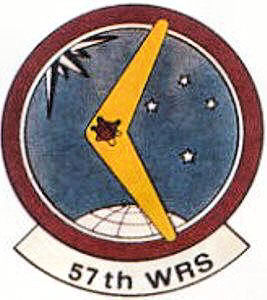
- 57th Weather Reconnaissance Squadron emblem (Note: Approved 12 September 1962.)

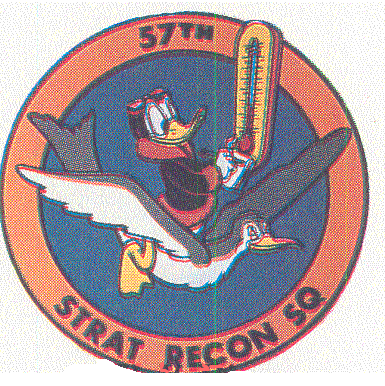
- 57th Strategic Reconnaissance Squadron emblem (Note: Approved 27 March 1953, reinstated 14 February 1968.)

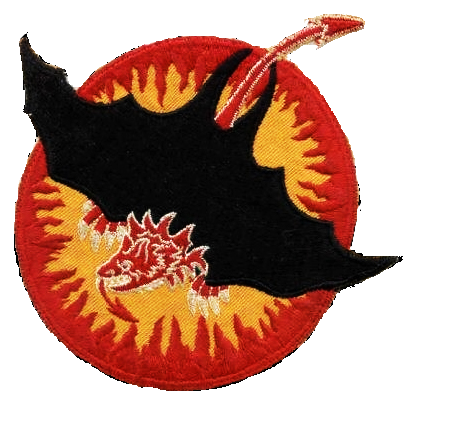
- Patch with 399th Fighter Squadron emblem

The 57th Weather Reconnaissance Squadron is an inactive United States Air Force squadron. Its last assignment was with the 9th Weather Reconnaissance Wing at Hickam Air Force Base, Hawaii, where it was inactivated on 10 November 1969.

== History ==
=== World War II ===
Activated in early 1943 under Fourth Air Force; spent World War II in the United States as an Operational Training Unit, initially equipped with Bell P-39 Airacobras for advanced fighter training. Reassigned to Third Air Force in 1944, becoming a Replacement Training Unit for North American A-36 Apache fighter-dive bomber ground attack aircraft.

The squadron moved to Stuttgart Army Air Field Arkansas in 1945 and realigned into a long-range strategic weather reconnaissance squadron, training with B-25 Mitchells and long-ranger P-61C Black Widow Night Fighters modified for weather reconnaissance missions. Moved to Rapid City Army Air Field, South Dakota in late 1945, using P-61Cs as part of a NACA/Air Weather Service Thunderstorm Project to learn more about thunderstorms and to use this knowledge to better protect civil and military airplanes that operated in their vicinity. The Northrop P-61 Black Widow's radar and particular flight characteristics enabled it to find and penetrate the most turbulent regions of a storm, and return crew and instruments intact for detailed study. Inactivated in 1946 as part of the general demobilization of the Army Air Forces.

=== Reserve reconnaissance unit ===
The squadron was activated in the reserve in July 1947 at Hamilton Field. However, it is not clear that it was manned or equipped beyond a token cadre before President Truman's reduced 1949 defense budget required reductions in the number units in the Air Force, and the squadron was inactivated in June 1949.

=== Weather reconnaissance ===
Reactivated in 1951 in Hawaii, Equipped with very long range Boeing WB-29 Superfortresses, upgrading to extended long-range Boeing WB-50D Superfortresses in 1956. Conducted long-range weather flights over the Arctic and along the northern periphery of the Soviet Union; the aircraft being equipped with sensors for detecting radioactive debris to gather evidence when the Soviets tested nuclear devices. Inactivated in 1958 as part of the phaseout of the WB-50s and development of faster jet aircraft for the long-range intelligence mission.

Reactivated in 1962 at Kirtland Air Force Base, New Mexico. Beginning in 1963 began to be equipped with new high-altitude reconnaissance Martin RB-57F Canberra aircraft modified for high altitude, long range intelligence gathering, assigned to the meteorological role. Part of their duties involved high-altitude atmospheric sampling and radiation detection work in support of nuclear test monitoring. Over the next decade the RB-57Fs were flown on a worldwide basis at very high altitudes at high speeds; the squadron being moved to Australia, then to Hawaii. Stress cracks began appearing in the wing spars and ribs of the RB-57Fs after a few years of service. Some were sent to General Dynamics for repairs. By 1969 the aircraft were basically worn out and they were flown to Davis-Monthan Air Force Base for storage. The squadron was then inactivated.

== Lineage ==
- Constituted as the 399th Fighter Squadron on 26 May 1943

Activated on 1 August 1943
Redesignated 399th Fighter-Bomber Squadron on 5 April 1944
Redesignated 399th Fighter Squadron on 5 June 1944
Redesignated 57th Reconnaissance Squadron, Weather on 7 July 1945
Inactivated on 25 January 1946
Redesignated 57th Reconnaissance Squadron, Very Long Range, Weather on 3 July 1947
Activated in the reserve on 1 August 1947
Inactivated on 27 June 1949
Redesignated 57th Strategic Reconnaissance Squadron, Medium, Weather on 22 January 1951
Activated on 21 February 1951
Redesignated 57th Weather Reconnaissance Squadron on 15 February 1954
Inactivated on 18 October 1958
Activated on 8 February 1962 (not organized)
Organized on 16 February 1962
Inactivated 10 November 1969

=== Assignments ===
- 369th Fighter Group, 1 August 1943
- Third Air Force, 7 July 1945
- III Reconnaissance Command, 21 July 1945 – 25 January 1946
- 70th Reconnaissance Group, 1 August 1947 – 27 June 1949
- Air Weather Service, 21 February 1951
- 2142d Air Weather Wing, 20 May 1951
- 1st Weather Wing, 8 February 1954 – 18 October 1958
- Military Air Transport Service, 8 February 1962 (not organized)
- 9th Weather Reconnaissance Group, 16 February 1962
- 9th Weather Reconnaissance Wing, 8 July 1965 – 10 November 1969

=== Stations ===
- Hamilton Field, California, 1 August 1943
- Redding Army Air Field, California, 1 November 1943
- Hamilton Field, California, 16 March 1944
- DeRidder Army Air Base Louisiana, 28 March 1944
- Stuttgart Army Air Field, Arkansas, 8 February 1945
- Will Rogers Field, Oklahoma, 21 July 1945
- Rapid City Army Air Field, South Dakota, 29 July 1945 – 25 January 1946
- Hamilton Field (later Hamilton Air Force Base), California, 1 August 1947 – 27 June 1949
- Hickam Air Force Base, Hawaii, 21 February 1951 – 18 October 1958
- Kirtland Air Force Base, New Mexico, 16 February 1962
- RAAF Laverton, Victoria, Australia, September 1963 - 8 July 1965 (Note: Two aircraft were stationed at RAAF East Sale, Australia between 1963 and 1965.)
- Avalon Airport, Victoria, Australia, 8 July 1965
- Hickam Air Force Base, Hawaii, 15 September 1965 – 10 November 1969

=== Aircraft ===
- Bell P-39 Airacobra, 1943–1944
- North American A-36 Apache, 1944
- Curtiss P-40 Warhawk, 1944–1945
- North American B-25 Mitchell, 1945
- Northrop P-61C Black Widow, 1945
- Boeing WB-29 Superfortress, 1951–1956
- Boeing WB-50 Superfortress, 1956–1958
- Martin WB-57F Canberra, 1962–1969
- Boeing WB-47E Stratojet, 1966-1969
- WC-130B Hercules 1963
- Lockheed U-2 c. 1963

== Bibliography ==
- Knaack, Marcelle Size (1978). Encyclopedia of US Air Force Aircraft and Missile Systems (PDF). Vol. 2, Post-World War II Bombers 1945-1973. Washington, DC: Office of Air Force History. ISBN 0-912799-59-5.
- Pape, Garry R.; Campbell, John M.; Campbell, Donna (1991). Northrop P-61 Black Widow: The Complete History and Combat Record. Minneapolis, MN: Motorbooks International. ISBN 978-0-879385-09-5.
- Markus, Rita M.; Halbeisen, MSG Nicholas F.; Fuller, John F. (1987). Matthews, James K.; Gustin, Joylyn I. (eds.). Air Weather Service: Our Heritage 1937-1987 (PDF). Scott AFB, IL: Air Weather Service. OCLC 18406969.
- Maurer, Maurer, ed. (1983) [1961]. Air Force Combat Units of World War II (PDF) (reprint ed.). Washington, DC: Office of Air Force History. ISBN 0-912799-02-1. LCCN 61060979. Archived from the original (PDF) on 20 December 2016.
- Maurer, Maurer, ed. (1982) [1969]. Combat Squadrons of the Air Force, World War II (PDF) (reprint ed.). Washington, DC: Office of Air Force History. ISBN 0-405-12194-6. LCCN 70605402. OCLC 72556.
- Robertson, Bruce, ed. (1961). United States Army and Air Force Fighters 1916-1961. Hertfordshire, England: Harleyford Publishers, Lts. OCLC 6398505.
