= 398 BC =

398 BC in various calendars
Gregorian calendar	398 BC; CCCXCVIII BC
Ab urbe condita	356
Ancient Egypt era	XXIX dynasty, 1
Pharaoh	Nepherites I, 1
Ancient Greek Olympiad (summer)	95th Olympiad, year 3
Assyrian calendar	4353
Balinese saka calendar	N/A
Bengali calendar	−991 – −990
Berber calendar	553
Buddhist calendar	147
Burmese calendar	−1035
Byzantine calendar	5111–5112
Chinese calendar	壬午年 (Water Horse); 2300 or 2093 — to — 癸未年 (Water Goat); 2301 or 2094
Coptic calendar	−681 – −680
Discordian calendar	769
Ethiopian calendar	−405 – −404
Hebrew calendar	3363–3364
- Hindu calendars
Vikram Samvat	−341 – −340
Shaka Samvat	N/A
Kali Yuga	2703–2704
Holocene calendar	9603
Iranian calendar	1019 BP – 1018 BP
Islamic calendar	1050 BH – 1049 BH
Javanese calendar	N/A
Julian calendar	N/A
Korean calendar	1936
Minguo calendar	2309 before ROC 民前2309年
Nanakshahi calendar	−1865
Thai solar calendar	145–146
Tibetan calendar	ཆུ་ཕོ་རྟ་ལོ་ (male Water-Horse) −271 or −652 or −1424 — to — ཆུ་མོ་ལུག་ལོ་ (female Water-Sheep) −270 or −651 or −1423

Year 398 BC was a year of the pre-Julian Roman calendar. At the time, it was known as the Year of the Tribunate of Potitus, Medullinus, Lactucinus, Fidenas, Camillus and Cornutus (or, less frequently, year 356 Ab urbe condita). The denomination 398 BC for this year has been used since the early medieval period, when the Anno Domini calendar era became the prevalent method in Europe for naming years.

== Events ==
=== By place ===
==== Sicily ====
- Dionysius, tyrant of Syracuse, breaks his peace treaty with Carthage and strikes at Carthaginian cities in the western corner of Sicily which have been weakened by the plague. There is a massacre of Carthaginians in many of these cities. Motya, with its fine harbour, is attacked and captured.

== Births ==
- The ‘Panke Baobab’ tree would have sprouted this during this year.
