= 164th Cyberspace Operations Squadron =

164th Cyberspace Operations Squadron

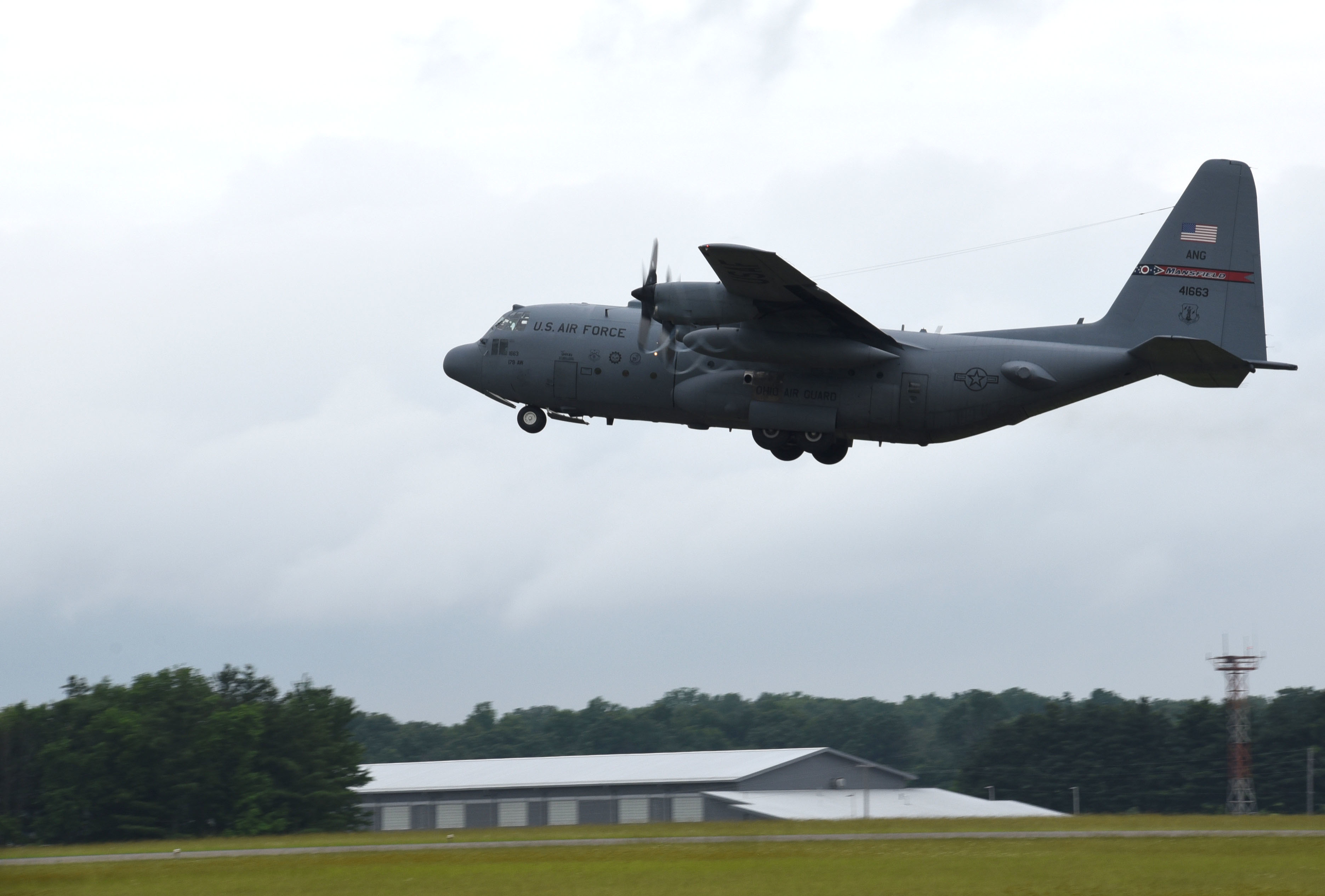
- C-130H Hercules Take-Off
- Active: 1942–1946; 1948–present
- Country: United States
- Allegiance: Ohio
- Branch: Air National Guard
- Type: Squadron
- Role: Cyberspace operations
- Part of: Ohio Air National Guard
- Garrison/HQ: Mansfield Lahm Air National Guard Base, Ohio
- Decorations: Distinguished Unit Citation; French Croix de Guerre with Palm

Insignia
- 164th Airlift Squadron emblem

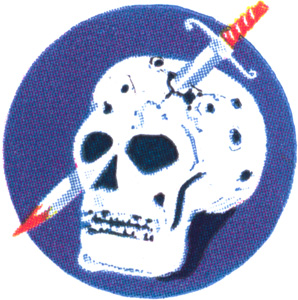
- 363d Fighter Squadron emblem

- Tail stripe

The 164th Cyberspace Operations Squadron is a squadron of the Ohio Air National Guard 179th Cyberspace Wing located at Mansfield Lahm Air National Guard Base, Mansfield, Ohio. Prior to 2022, the 164th was a flying unit equipped with the Lockheed C-130 Hercules.

== History ==
=== World War II ===
The 363d Fighter Squadron was established at Hamilton Field, California in December 1942. It began training on the Bell P-39 Airacobra at Tonopah Army Air Field, Nevada.

It became part of the United States Air Forces in Europe army of occupation in Germany during 1945. Inactivated in Germany during August 1946.

=== Ohio Air National Guard ===
The 363d Fighter Squadron was redesignated the 164th Fighter Squadron, and was allotted to the National Guard on 24 May 1946. It was organized at Mansfield Lahm Regional Airport, Ohio, and was extended federal recognition on 20 June 1948. The 164th Fighter Squadron was equipped with north American P-51D Mustangs and was assigned to the 55th Fighter Wing, operationally gained by Continental Air Command.

==== Air defense ====
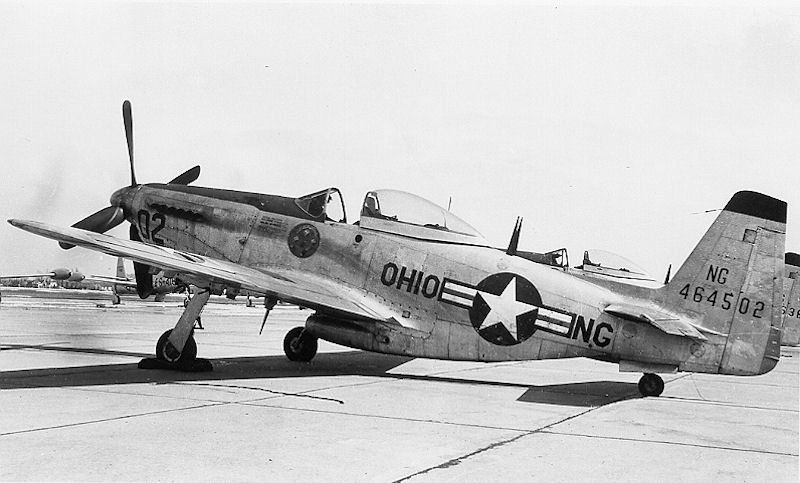
164th FS P-51H Mustang 44-64502

With the formation and federal recognition of the 121st Fighter Group at Lockbourne Army Air Field, near Columbus, the squadron was reassigned. The mission of the 164th Fighter Squadron was the air defense of Ohio. Parts were no problem and many of the maintenance personnel were World War II veterans so readiness was quite high and the planes were often much better maintained than their USAF counterparts. In some ways, the postwar Air National Guard was almost like a flying country club and a pilot could often show up at the field, check out an aircraft and go flying. However, the unit also had regular military exercises that kept up proficiency and in gunnery and bombing contests they would often score at least as well or better than active-duty USAF units, given the fact that most ANG pilots were World War II combat veterans. In 1949 the squadron exchanged its F-51Ds for F-51H Mustang very long range escort fighters that were suitable for long-range interception of unknown aircraft identified by Ground Control Interceptor radar stations.

With the surprise invasion of South Korea on 25 June 1950, and the regular military's lack of readiness, most of the Air National Guard was federalized and placed on active duty. The 164th Fighter Squadron was federalized on 10 February 1951. The 164th, however, was selected to remain in Ohio and continue the air defense mission, being operationally gained by the Eastern Air Defense Force, Air Defense Command. With the end of the federalization of the Air National Guard in 1952, the 164th again was assigned to the 121st Tactical Fighter Group at Columbus, however the squadron remained in an attached status to Air Defense Command.

In September 1953 after the Korean War, the 164th received its first jet aircraft, refurbished Lockheed F-80A Shooting Stars that had been modified and upgraded to F-80C standards. The squadron only operated the Shooting Star for a year when in October 1954 the equipment was changed to Republic F-84E Thunderjets that had returned from wartime duty in Korea. In August 1954, the 164th began standing daytime air defense alert at Mansfield, placing two aircraft at the end of the runway with pilots in the cockpit from one hour before sunrise until one hour after sunset. This ADC alert lasted each and every day until 30 June 1956.

In early 1957, the squadron sent their war-weary Thunderjets to storage at Davis-Monthan AFB, Arizona and received new Republic F-84F Thunderstreak swept-wing interceptors. Later in 1957, the 164th Fighter-Bomber Squadron received the 1st Air Force Flying Safety Award for three consecutive years of accident-free flying, an impressive accomplishment as in the previous three years the squadron had flown three different types of aircraft.

==== Tactical Air Command ====
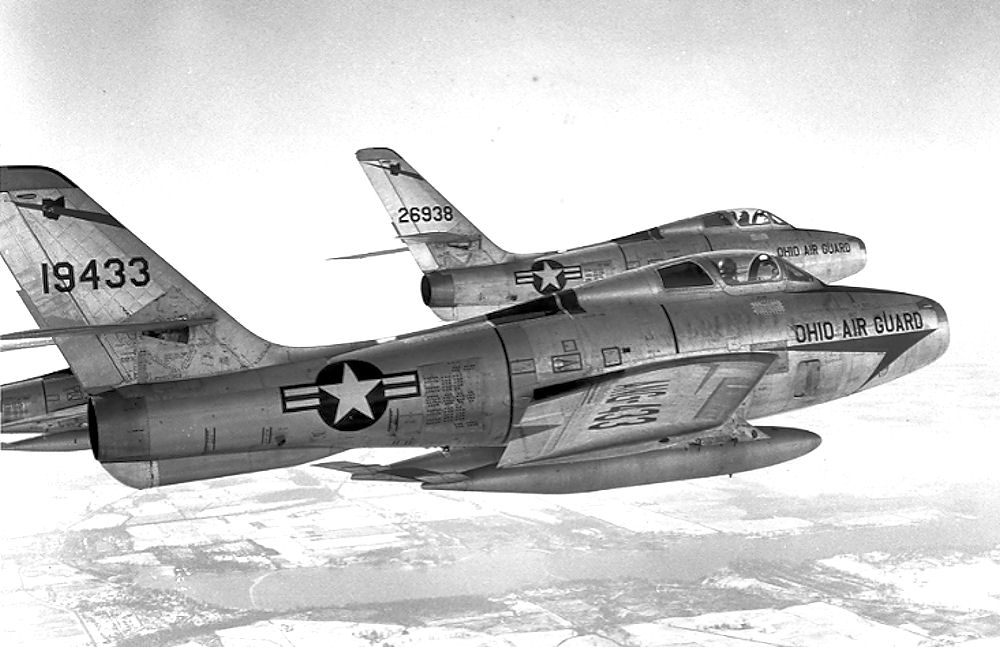
Two F-84F Thunderstreaks in formationm 51-9433 and 52-6938

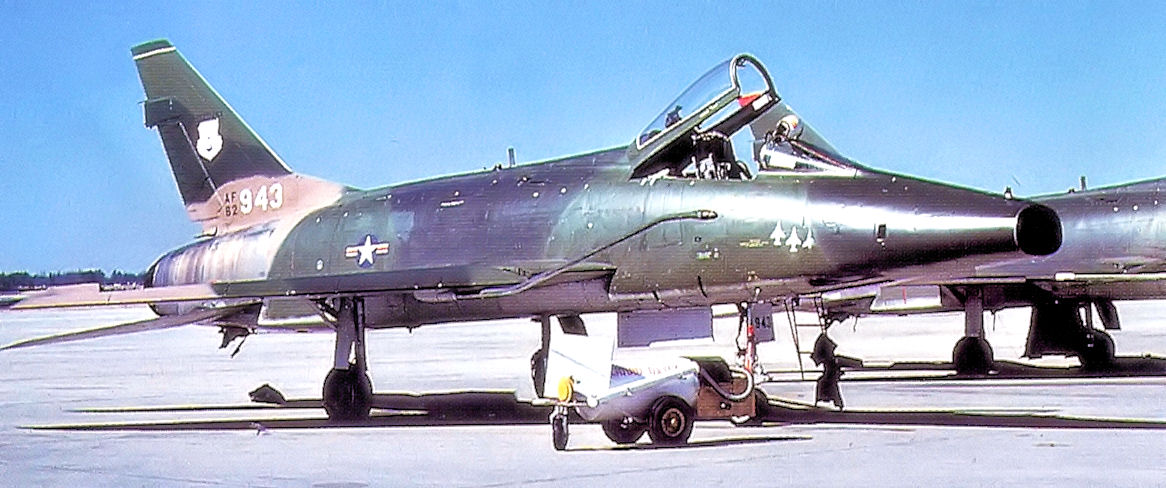
164th TFS F-100D 56-2943

On 10 November 1958, the squadron was re-designated as the 164th Tactical Fighter Squadron and the squadron ended its attachment to Air Defense Command, returning to Tactical Air Command control.

During the 1961 Berlin Crisis, the 164th was federalized as part of the 121st Tactical Fighter Wing and Group for a period of twelve months beginning on 1 October. When activated, the 121st TFW consisted of three operational units, the 162d Tactical Fighter Squadron, based at Springfield Municipal Airport, Springfield Ohio; the 166th Tactical Fighter Squadron based at Lockbourne AFB, Ohio, and the 164th TFS at Mansfied. However, due to funding shortages, only 26 F-84F's of 166th TFS were deployed to Étain-Rouvres Air Base, France, although several ground support units from the 162d and 164th were also deployed. The squadron, however, remained under Federal USAF control until the crisis ended and it was returned to Ohio state control on 31 August 1962.

After the Berlin Federalization ended on 15 October 1962, the 164th was authorized to expand to a group level, and the 179th Tactical Fighter Group was established by the National Guard Bureau. The 164th TFS becoming the group's flying squadron. Other elements assigned into the group were the 179th headquarters, 179th Material Squadron (maintenance and supply), 179th Combat Support Squadron, and the 179th Tactical Dispensary.

The squadron continued normal peacetime training throughout the 1960s. Individual squadron members volunteered for duty during the Vietnam War, however the 164th was not federalized in 1968 as the F-84Fs were not considered front line combat aircraft. In February 1972, the squadron retired its Thunderstreaks and converted to the North American F-100 Super Sabre as a result of the American draw-down from the Vietnam War.

==== Tactical Airlift ====
The squadron flew the F-100s until the winter of 1976 when the 179th was transferred from Tactical Air Command to Military Airlift Command on 5 January. At this time, the unit converted to the Lockheed C-130B Hercules and received a complement of eight aircraft. With the change of equipment, the unit was designated a Tactical Airlift Group. Upgrade to the C-130H was completed in 1991.

The 179th Airlift Group was active during Desert Shield/Storm providing airlift support throughout the Continental United States and Europe. Portions of the 179th were activated during Desert Shield/Storm and served in the US, Europe and Saudi Arabia.

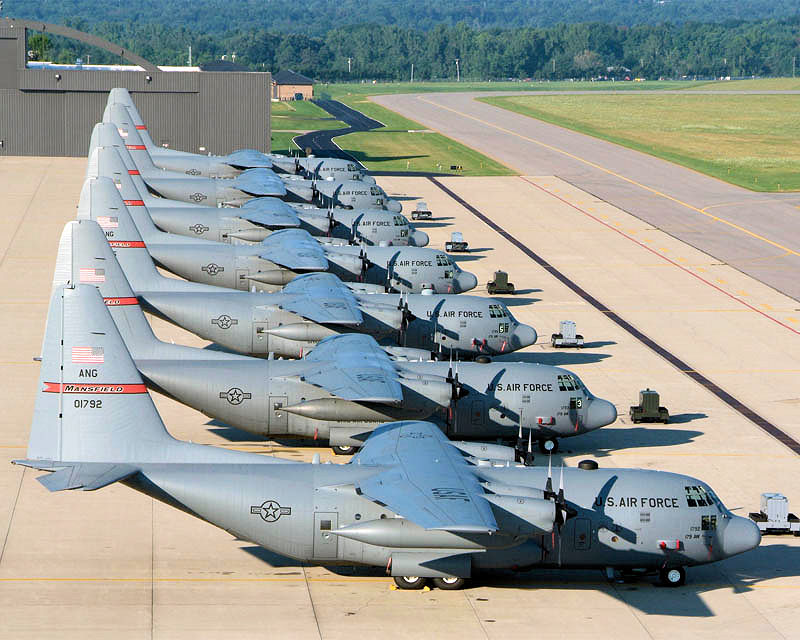
Squadron C-130H Hercules about 2008

In March 1992, the 179th adopted the USAF Objective Wing organization and became simply the 179th Airlift Group; the 164th as an Airlift Squadron. On 1 June of that year, Military Airlift Command was inactivated as part of the Air Force restructuring after the end of the Cold War. Air Mobility Command (AMC) initially became the gaining major command for the 179th, although on 1 October 1993, it was moved to Air Combat Command along with the other C-130 units.

With the Air National Guard in the post Cold War era providing nearly 50% of the USAF's tactical airlift capability, the 179th Airlift Group supported combat and humanitarian operations and exercises around the world, beginning in July 1992 as part of Operation Provide Promise; a humanitarian relief operation in Bosnia and Herzegovina during the Yugoslav War. Ongoing until 1996 airlift units delivered food, medicine, and supplies and evacuating over 1,300 wounded people from the region. It the longest running humanitarian airlift in history.

In late 1992, the 179th began airlifting personnel, equipment and supplies to Somalia as part of Operation Restore Hope. The Air Force enlisted Air National Guard units being charged with carrying out United Nations Security Council Resolution 794: to create a protected environment for conducting humanitarian operations in the southern half of Somalia.

The 179th was also engaged in Operation Uphold Democracy (19 September 1994 – 31 March 1995) providing airlift support to United States military forces in Hati during its military intervention designed to remove the military regime installed by the 1991 Haitian coup d'état that overthrew the elected President Jean-Bertrand Aristide.

On 11 October 1995, in accordance with the Air Force One Base-One Wing directive, the 179th Airlift Group was expanded and changed in status to the 179th Airlift Wing. Under the Objective Wing organization, the 164th Airlift Squadron was assigned to the 179th Operations Group. Support groups to the wing were the 179th Maintenance Group, 179th Mission Support Group and the 179th Medical Group.

In mid-1996, the Air Force, in response to budget cuts, and changing world situations, began experimenting with Air Expeditionary organizations. The Air Expeditionary Force (AEF) concept was developed that would mix Active-Duty, Reserve and Air National Guard elements into a combined force. Instead of entire permanent units deploying as "Provisional" as in the 1991 Gulf War, Expeditionary units are composed of "aviation packages" from several wings, including active-duty Air Force, the Air Force Reserve Command and the Air National Guard, would be married together to carry out the assigned deployment rotation.

In December 1996, the 164th Expeditionary Airlift Squadron (164th EAS) was first formed from 179th personnel and aircraft and deployed to Pisa Airport, Italy in support of Operation Joint Guard. It assisted in providing logistical support to NATO-led multinational peacekeeping force in Bosnia and Herzegovina which was tasked with upholding the Dayton Peace Agreement. This ongoing commitment continued until 1998. Other Air Expeditionary Force deployments in the late 1990s included Operation Joint Endeavor, Operation Joint Forge and Operation Shining Hope, all addressing the Yugoslavian crises of the era.

==== Modern Era ====
After the events of 11 September 2001 the 164th EAS has been activated on several occasions, initially providing logistic support for Air Force fighter squadrons engaged in Combat Air Patrols over major cities during Operation Noble Eagle in late 2001 and 2002. The EAS has seen duty in Afghanistan as part of Operation Enduring Freedom and Iraq as part of Operation Iraqi Freedom.

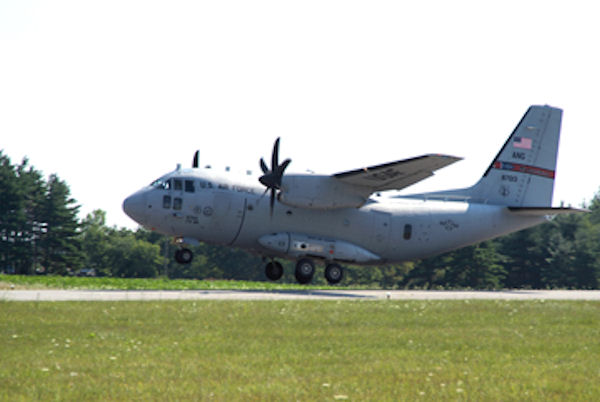
164th Airlift Squadron C-27J taking off from Mansfield AGB

In its 2005 BRAC Recommendations, DoD recommended to close Mansfield-Lahm Municipal Airport Air Guard Station (AGS), Ohio. The 179th Airlift Squadron would distribute its eight C-130H aircraft The 908th Airlift Wing (AFR), Maxwell AFB, Alabama (four aircraft), and the 314th Airlift Wing, Little Rock AFB, Arkansas (four aircraft). Flying related Expeditionary Combat Support (ECS) moves to Louisville IAP AGS, KY (aerial port) and Toledo Express Airport AGS, OH (fire fighters). However, due to the base's superior record and recommendations for reconsideration by state and local officials, the base was incorporated into the Ohio Air National Guard's future by receiving a bridge mission of flying a C-21 Learjet mission until it becomes operational in the C-27J Spartan.

On 20 July 2008, the 179th AW continued its growth by the standing up of the 200th Red Horse (Rapid Engineer Deployable Heavy Operational Repair Squadron Engineers) detachment. Mansfield Lahm ANGB has been assigned with 200 Red Horse personnel and another 200 will be assigned to Port Clinton. A new building across the airfield was constructed to house the attachment, completed in 2010.

The 179th AW, along with the 175th Wing of the Maryland Air National Guard, was the first unit to train and deploy the C-27J Spartan in 2010. Airmen from the 179th Airlift Wing made Air National Guard history 26 July 2011, by deploying in support of Operation Enduring Freedom for the first time with the C-27J Spartan, one of the Air Force's newest aircraft. This joint mission was conducted with aircrew from the 164th Airlift Squadron, a subordinate unit of the 179th Airlift Wing, and Soldiers from the Oklahoma and Georgia National Guard. They worked in conjunction with the 159th Combat Aviation Brigade, from Fort Campbell, Kentucky, in direct support of the Army for airlift and airdrop operations. The 179th AW made history with a nine-month overseas rotation, as opposed to the typical four to six month Air National Guard deployment schedule.

As of 25 August 2021, the 179th AW was chosen as the preferred site for the Air National Guard's first cyber warfare wing. The decision came after many months of uncertainty, starting in mid 2020. The original proposal was that either the 133d Airlift Wing of the Minnesota ANG or the 179th would host the new mission, and in the process divesting the unit's C-130H fleet. Initially, local officials were defenders of the 179th's role in supporting the Air Force's tactical airlift mission. In time, however, their focus shifted towards support in securing the cyber warfare mission for the 179th. Despite many citing the need to maintain a larger fleet of the world's foremost tactical airlifter, the Air Force has continued with plans to reduce the C-130 fleet by approximately 50 aircraft, mainly by retiring the oldest of the C-130H fleet. In June 2022, the last C-130H assigned to the 179th AW was divested, ending a nearly 80 year heritage of flying service, and 46 years of C-130 operations.

== Lineage ==
- Constituted as the 363d Fighter Squadron and activated, on 1 December 1942

Inactivated on 20 August 1946.
Redesignated 164th Fighter Squadron, and allotted to Ohio ANG, on 21 August 1946.
Extended federal recognition on 20 June 1948
Redesignated 164th Fighter-Bomber Squadron on 5 November 1952
Redesignated 164th Tactical Fighter Squadron on 10 November 1958
Federalized and ordered to active service on 1 October 1961
Released from active duty and returned to Ohio state control, 31 August 1962
Redesignated 164th Tactical Airlift Squadron on 5 January 1976
Redesignated 164th Airlift Squadron on 15 March 1992
Redesignated 164th Cyberspace Operations Squadron on 19 April 2024

=== Assignments ===
- 357th Fighter Group, 1 Dec 1942 – 20 Aug 1946
- 55th Fighter Wing, 20 June 1948
- 121st Fighter Group (later 121st Fighter-Interceptor Group, 121st Fighter-Bomber Group, 121st Fighter-Interceptor Group, 26 June 1948 (elements attached to 7122d Tactical Wing, 1 October 1961 – 31 August 1962
- 179th Tactical Fighter Group (later 179th Tactical Airlift Group, Airlift Group), 15 October 1962
- 179th Operations Group, 11 October 1995 – present

=== Stations ===
- Hamilton Field, California, 1 December 1942
- Tonopah Army Air Field, Nevada, 6 March 1943
- Santa Rosa Army Air Field, California, 3 June 1943
- Oroville Army Air Field, California, 18 August 1943
- Casper Army Air Field, Wyoming, 7 Oct-9 Nov 1943
- RAF Raydon (AAF-157), England, 1 December 1943
- RAF Leiston (AAF-373), England, 1 February 1944
- AAF Station Neubiberg, Germany, 20 Jul 1945 – 20 Aug 1946.
- Mansfield Lahm Regional Airport (later Mansfield Lahm Air National Guard Base), Ohio, 20 June 1948 – present

==== Ohio Air National Guard deployments ====
- 1991 Gulf War (Desert Storm/Desert Shield)

Saudi Arabia, 1990–1991

- Operation Provide Promise

Bosnia 1992–1996

- Operation Restore Hope

Somalia 1992–1993

- Operation Uphold Democracy

Haiti 1994–1995

- Operation Joint Guard (AEF)

Bosnia 1996–1998

- Operation Joint Endeavor (AEF)

Bosnia 1998

- Operation Joint Forge (AEF)

Bosnia 1999–2002

- Operation Southern Watch (AEF)

Incirlik Air Base, Turkey 1996–1999

- Operation Shining Hope (AEF)

Kosovo, Albania, Macedonia 1999

- Operation Noble Eagle (AEF)

2001–2002

- Operation Enduring Freedom (AEF)

Undisclosed locations, Afghanistan 2003–2004 (550 total missions)
Bagram Airfield, Afghanistan, 2011–2012

- Operation Iraqi Freedom (AEF)

Bagram Air Base, Iraq, 2003–2004 (2100 total missions)

=== Aircraft ===
- Bell P-39 Airacobra, 1943
- North American P-51D (later F-51) Mustang, 1943–1946, 1948–1953
- Lockheed F-80C Shooting Star, 1953–1954
- Republic F-84E Thunderjet, 1954–1957
- Republic F-84F Thunderstreak, 1957–1972
- North American F-100D/F Super Sabre, 1972–1976
- Lockheed C-130B Hercules, 1976–1991
- Lockheed C-130H Hercules, 1991–2010
- C-21A Learjet, 2010–2011
- C-27J Spartan, 2010–2013
- Lockheed C-130H Hercules, 2013-2022
