= Yuba County Airport =

Airport in Yuba County, California

Yuba County Airport (former Marysville Army Airfield)
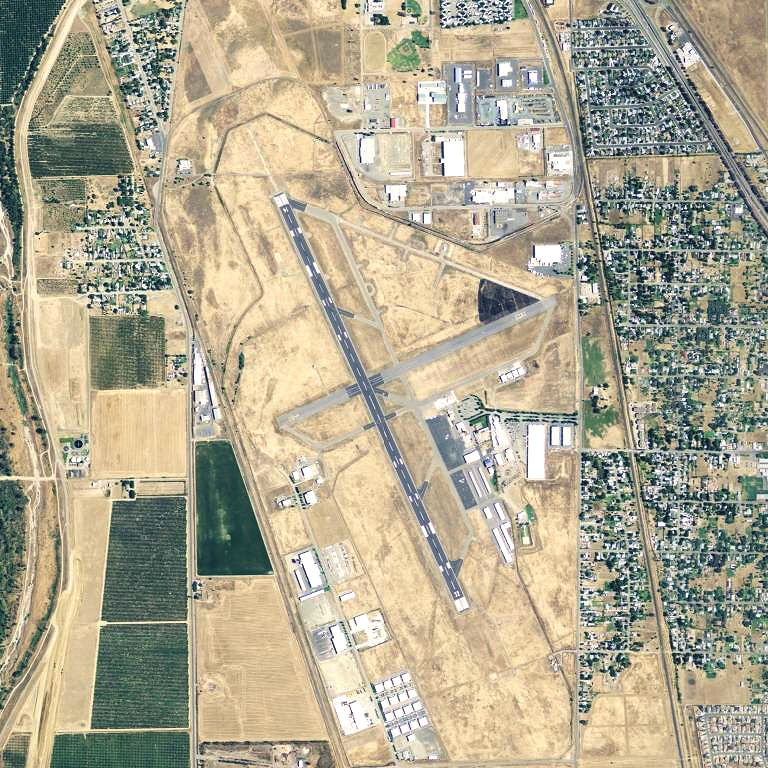
- USGS 2006 orthophoto
- IATA: MYV; ICAO: KMYV; FAA LID: MYV

Summary
- Airport type: Public
- Owner: Yuba County
- Serves: Marysville, California
- Elevation AMSL: 64 ft (20 m)
- Coordinates: 39°05′52″N 121°34′11″W

Map
- Location within California

Runways
Direction	Length		Surface
Direction	ft	m	Surface
14/32	6,007	1,831	Asphalt
5/23	3,314	1,010	Asphalt

Statistics (2018)
- Aircraft operations: 35,300
- Based aircraft: 42
- Source: Federal Aviation Administration

Yuba County Airport (/ˈjuːbə/; IATA: MYV, ICAO: KMYV, FAA LID: MYV) is in Yuba County, California, United States, three miles southeast of Marysville. The National Plan of Integrated Airport Systems for 2011–2015 categorized it as a general aviation facility.

== History ==
The Civil Aeronautics Board, authorized by Public No. 812, 76th Congress, approved the construction of Alicia Airport, and the City of Marysville and the County of Yuba jointly purchased 833 acres for the purpose. Alicia Airport was built in 1941 by contractor L. D. Richardson and Co. of Beverly Hills, California.

In March 1942 the City of Marysville and the County of Yuba leased the airport and its 833 acres to the Army Air Forces to serve as the air support command base for Marysville Cantonment (later named Camp Beale), and it was designated as Marysville Army Airfield. It was briefly used as a sub-base of Hamilton Field and controlled by the IV Fighter Command. One major unit served at Marysville Army Airfield, the 369th Fighter Group, a Replacement Training Unit that trained on A-36 Apaches, P-39 Airacobras, and P-40 Warhawks. The group had three fighter squadrons, the 398th, 399th, and 400th.

It served there from November 5, 1943, until moving to Oroville Army Airfield in January 1944. Marysville Army Air Field was eventually transferred to the Air Technical Service Command and was vacated.

In 1946 the City of Marysville released all interest in the airport to Yuba County, and in August 1947, through the War Assets Administration, Marysville Army Airfield was released to Yuba County. Yuba County Airport was licensed as an approved airport on September 30, 1949, by the State and continues to operate as a municipal airport and industrial park.

Airline flights were provided by Southwest Airways and its successors from the late 1940s until about 1970.

In early 2022, Yuba County adopted a local rule prohibiting the operation of ultralight aircraft at Yuba County Airport. In April 2023, the Federal Aviation Administration (FAA) notified the County that the restriction was inconsistent with the airport’s federal grant assurances. As of 2025, the matter has been referred to the FAA’s Airport Compliance Division (ACO-100) for further review.

== Facilities ==
Yuba County Airport covers 933 acres (378 ha) at an elevation of 64 feet (20 m). It has two asphalt runways: 14/32 is 6,007 by 150 feet (1,831 x 46 m) and 5/23 is 3,314 by 60 feet (1,010 x 18 m).

In the year ending December 31, 2018, the airport had 35,300 aircraft operations, average 97 per day: 99% general aviation and <1% air taxi. 42 aircraft were then based at this airport: 37 single-engine, 3 multi-engine, and 2 helicopter.

== See also ==
- California World War II Army Airfields
- List of airports in California
