= San Francisco Fighter Wing =

- Active: 1942–1944
- Country: United States
- Branch: United States Army; United States Air Force (Note: When the United States Air Force became a separate service in September 1947, all former Army Air Forces units, including disbanded units were transferred to its control.)
- Role: Air defense and fighter training
- Engagements: World War II

Commanders
- Notable commanders: General Dean C. Strother

Insignia
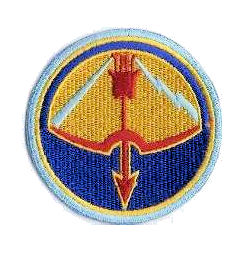
- Patch with San Francisco Fighter Wing emblem (Note: Approved 5 February 1943.)

The San Francisco Fighter Wing is a disbanded United States Air Force unit. The wing provided air defense of the central Pacific coast and trained fighter units and pilots. It was stationed at San Francisco, California, where it was disbanded on 7 June 1944.

== History ==
Along the Pacific coast, Western Defense Command established a "vital air defense zone", extending from the coast approximately 150 miles (240 km) inland and 200 miles (320 km) to sea. To carry out this mission, Fourth Air Force organized regional air defense wings in August 1942. The San Francisco Air Defense Wing was organized to provide air defense for the central Pacific coast area and train fighter groups and pilots.

The Army Air Forces later found that standard military units like the wing, whose manning was based on relatively inflexible tables of organization were not well adapted to the training mission, even more so to the replacement mission. Accordingly, the Army Air Forces adopted a more functional system in which each base was organized into a separate numbered unit, with similar flexible units established for headquarters.

In this reorganization, the wing's mission, equipment and personnel were transferred to the 411th AAF Base Unit (Fighter Wing) on 1 April 1944, The wing remained a paper unit until 7 June, when the 411th was simultaneously redescribed as the 411th AAF Base Unit (Air Defense Region). In 1946, the 411th became the 411th AAF Base Unit (San Francisco Control Group). It was discontinued on 1 January 1947.

== Lineage ==
- Constituted as the San Francisco Air Defense Wing on 6 August 1942

Activated on 11 August 1942
Redesignated San Francisco Fighter Wing c. 2 July 1943
Disbanded on 7 June 1944

=== Assignments ===
- IV Fighter Command, 11 August 1942
- Fourth Air Force, 31 March 1944 – 7 June 1944

=== Components ===
- 328th Fighter Group: attached c. 28 October 1942, assigned 11 April 1943 – 1 March 1944
- 354th Fighter Group: attached 15 November 1942 - 2 June 1943
- 357th Fighter Group: c. April 1943 - c. 7 October 1943
- 363d Fighter Group, 12 April – 30 December 1943
- 367th Fighter Group: 15 July 1943 – c. 8 March 1944
- 369th Fighter Group: 1 August 1943 – c. 28 March 1944
- 372d Fighter Group: 28 October 1943 - c. 7 December 1943
- 478th Fighter Group: 1 December 1943 – c. 3 February 1944

=== Stations ===
- San Francisco, California, 20 August 1942 - 7 June 1944
