= Oroville Municipal Airport =

Airport in California, United States of America

Oroville Municipal Airport Oroville Army Airfield
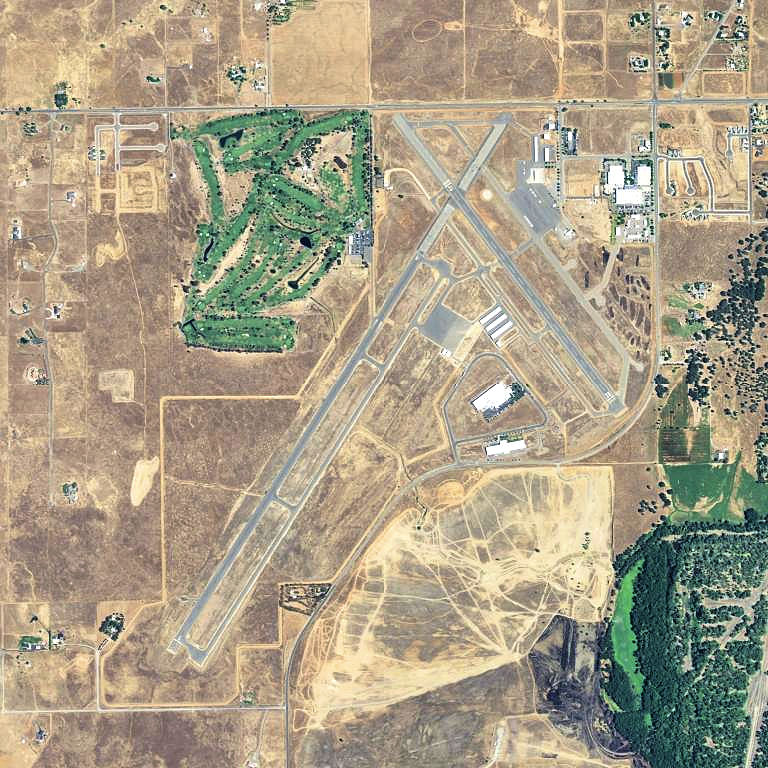
- 2006 USGS orthopthoto
- IATA: OVE; ICAO: KOVE

Summary
- Airport type: Public
- Operator: City of Oroville
- Location: Oroville, California
- Elevation AMSL: 194 ft / 59.2 m
- Coordinates: 39°29′16.10″N 121°37′19.20″W

Map
- Location of Oroville Municipal Airport

Runways
Direction	Length		Surface
Direction	ft	m	Surface
02/20	6,020	1,835	Asphalt
13/31	3,540	1,079	Asphalt

Statistics (2018)
- Aircraft operations: 36,000
- Based aircraft: 47
- Source: Federal Aviation Administration

Oroville Municipal Airport (IATA: OVE, ICAO: KOVE) is a public airport located 3 miles (5 km) southwest of the city of Oroville in Butte County, California, United States.

== Facilities ==
Oroville Municipal Airport covers 877 acres (3.55 km^{2}) and has two runways:

- Runway 02/20: 6,020 x 100 ft (1,835 x 30 m), surface: asphalt
- Runway 13/31: 3,540 x 100 ft (1,079 x 30 m), surface: asphalt

Table Mountain Aviation is part of the Oroville Municipal Airport, which lies approximately 3 miles (4.8 km) southwest of downtown.

The airport has two runways: Runway 02/20 (6,020 feet long by 100 feet wide) and Runway 13/31 (3,540 feet long by 100 feet wide). The runway system is anchored by three major parallel taxiways:

- Taxiway A is a full-length 60-foot-wide taxiway (18 m) located on the east side of Runway 02/20.
- Taxiway J is a full-length 40-foot-wide taxiway (12 m) located on the west side of Runway 13/31.
- Taxiway R is a full-length 70-foot-wide taxiway (21 m) located on the east side of Runway 13/31.

Three main apron areas exist on the airfield. The largest is located around the Table Mountain Aviation FBO buildings. The FBO apron area is home to 38 tie-downs as well as the fuel tanks and provides access to Taxiway R to the west of the apron and Taxiway S to the north of the apron. The second largest apron area is located in the midfield area of the airfield, south of Runway 20. It is home to 76 tie downs. The third apron area is located east of the Table Mountain Golf Course, provides space for five tie downs, and is ideal for golfers that fly to the airport.

== History ==
In 1936, the City of Oroville acquired 188 acres (0.76 km^{2}) of grazing land for use as a municipal airport. During 1941, the city and the Works Project Administration (WPA) extended the runways and increased the total airport land area to 428 acres (1.73 km^{2}).

In 1942, the War Department leased the Oroville Municipal Airport and renamed it Oroville Army Air Field (AAF). That same year the Army purchased an additional 381.98 acres (1.5458 km^{2}) of land for the expansion of the field and construction of a cantonment area. Once operational, it served as a fighter group training installation from the spring of 1943 through the early summer 1944. Two fighter groups rotated through Oroville AAF: the 357th Fighter Group (fighter group of famed pilots Chuck Yeager and Bud Anderson) and the 369th Fighter Group. Aircraft present at the field were identified as the Bell P-39Q Airacobra, North American P-51B/C/D Mustangs, and possibly the North American A-36 Apache, the ground attack version of the P-51.

Layout plans of the former Oroville AAF dated 1944 indicate a Bomb Storage Area west of the two runways and a skeet range between the southern extents of the runways. Fueling pit boxes were located along former Taxiways A (running parallel to runway 13/31) and C (connecting the southernmost ends of runways 02/20 and 13/31). A 1947 Inventory Report of Buildings and Structures states that bombs were stored in earth revetments.

In 1945 Oroville AAF was listed as “temporarily inactive” under assignment to Air Technical Service Command and was later classified as surplus. In 1946 the War Assets Administration (WAA) assumed custody of the site and on 21 May 1947, the WAA terminated the U.S. Army's lease with the City of Oroville and returned ownership to civil authorities.

=== 2019 runway excursion ===
On August 21, 2019, a Cessna Citation Excel operated by Delta Private Jets bound for Portland International Airport suffered a runway excursion at the departure end of Runway 02 after an aborted takeoff. After sliding sideways on its tires for 1,990 ft (610 m), the jet impacted a small ditch at the end of some grassland surrounding the southern edge of the airfield where a small fire immediately began. After all ten occupants (two crew, eight passengers) safely evacuated, the fire quickly engulfed the aircraft, permanently damaging it. The aircraft fire spawned a rapidly-spreading grassland fire during one of the most deadly fire seasons the area had experienced in decades, creating a moment of panic due to its close proximity to an industrial park and populated areas before it was contained within an hour.

== Statistics ==
For the year ending 31 December 2018, the airport had a total of 36,000 aircraft operations, which is an average of 99 movements per day; 56% general aviation (itinerant), 40% general aviation (local), and 4% air taxi.

During this time, 47 aircraft were listed with Oroville Muni as their home base: 44 single-engined aircraft, 1 helicopter, and 1 ultralight.

== See also ==
- California World War II Army Airfields
